= Timeline of Irish inventions and discoveries =

Irish contributions to science, technology, and engineering

Irish inventions and discoveries are objects, processes, or techniques which owe their existence either partially or entirely to an Irish person. Often, things which are discovered for the first time are also called "inventions", and in many cases, there is no clear line between the two.

Ireland has made significant contributions to fields ranging from chemistry and physics to medicine and engineering. Irish inventors and scientists have been responsible for foundational discoveries including Boyle's law, the Kelvin scale, and the proof of the greenhouse effect, as well as practical innovations such as the hypodermic needle, the ejection seat, and the modern submarine.

== Pre-history ==
- Ogham – The earliest form of writing in Ireland, consisting of a series of strokes along a central line. This unique alphabet was used primarily on stone monuments and is found throughout Ireland and western Britain, representing one of the few indigenous European writing systems.
- Iomániocht – Early stick-and-ball games including scuaib, camán, and ioman that served as precursors to modern Hurling. These games have ancient roots in Irish culture, with references appearing in early Irish literature and mythology.

== 6th century ==
- Penitential – Irish monks developed the penitential system of private confession and assigned penances, which spread throughout Europe and fundamentally changed Christian religious practice. This Irish innovation replaced the earlier system of public penance that could only be performed once in a lifetime.

== 7th century ==
- Word spacing – Irish scribes began adding spaces between words in written texts, a practice that eventually spread throughout Europe. Before this innovation, Latin texts were written in scriptio continua without separation between words. This seemingly simple change dramatically improved reading speed and comprehension.

== 14th century ==
- Caid – A traditional Irish football game that served as a precursor to modern Gaelic football. The sport involved kicking and carrying a ball toward goals, with rules varying by region. It represents one of the oldest codified team sports in Europe.

== 15th century ==
- Whiskey – The earliest known documentary reference to whiskey in Ireland appears in the Annals of the Four Masters under the year 1405, which records that a chieftain died “by taking a surfeit of aqua vitae.” The term corresponds to the Irish uisce beatha (“water of life”), from which the word whiskey is derived.

== 17th century ==
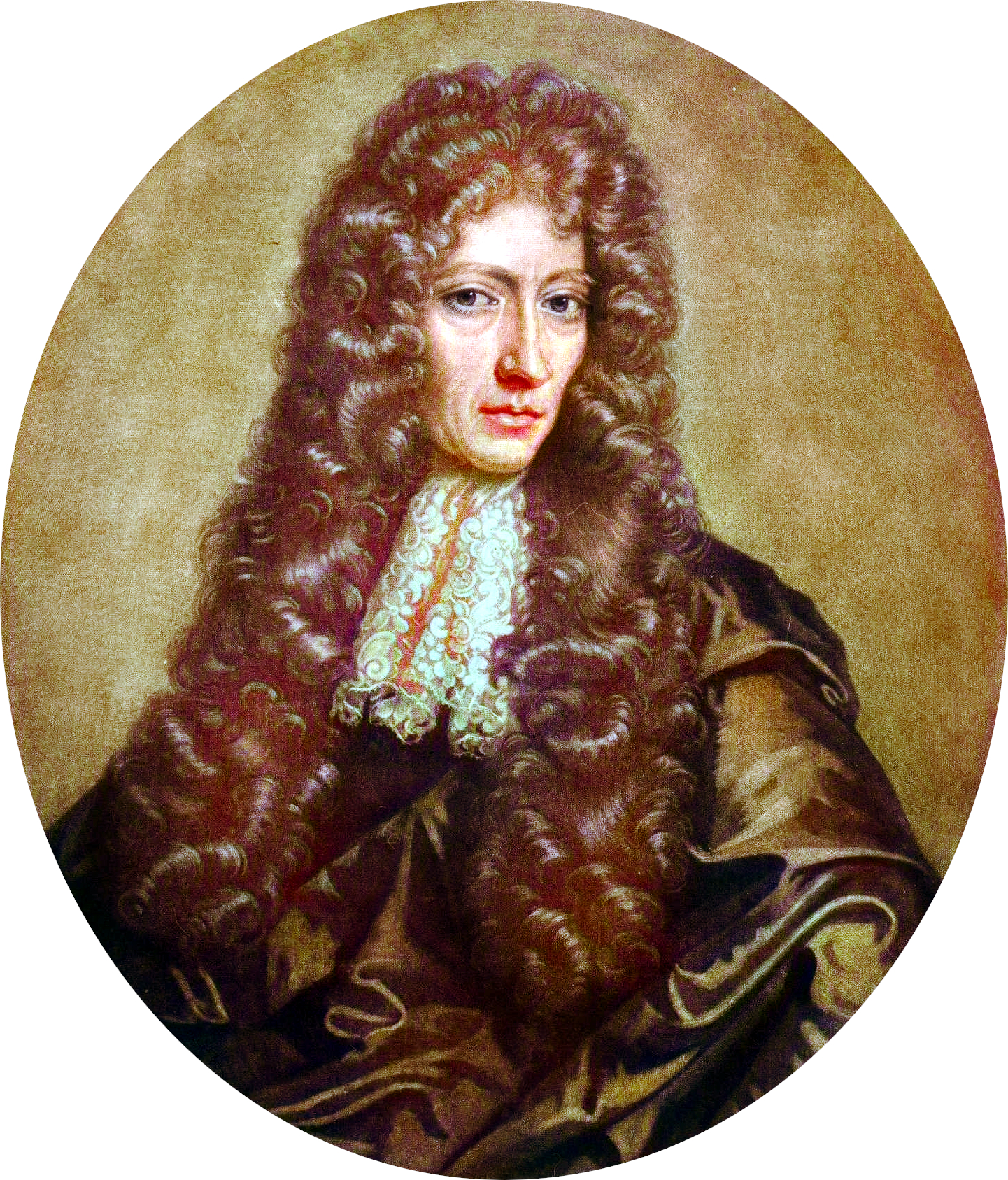
Robert Boyle, founder of modern chemistry

- Irish road bowling – A traditional Irish sport in which competitors throw a heavy iron ball along a course of country roads, with the winner completing the course in the fewest throws. The sport remains popular in County Cork and County Armagh.
- 1661: Modern chemistry – Robert Boyle of County Waterford is considered the founder of modern chemistry through his publication of The Sceptical Chymist. This work challenged the prevailing Aristotelian and Paracelsian theories of matter, advocating instead for experimental evidence and the concept of chemical elements.
- 1662: Boyle's law – Robert Boyle discovered the inverse relationship between the pressure and volume of a gas at constant temperature. This fundamental gas law, expressed as PV = k, laid the groundwork for the development of thermodynamics and remains essential to chemistry and physics.
- 1680s: European adaptation of drinking chocolate – Hans Sloane, a physician from County Down, is often credited with introducing milk chocolate to Europe after observing cacao preparation in Jamaica. However, this claim is disputed; historian James Delbourgo notes that Jamaicans were brewing hot chocolate with milk as early as 1494.

== 18th century ==
- 1730: Entrepreneurship – Richard Cantillon, an Irish-French economist born in County Kerry, was the first to formally describe the concept of entrepreneurship in his Essai sur la Nature du Commerce en Général. He defined the entrepreneur as someone who bears risk and uncertainty in the pursuit of profit, laying the foundation for modern economic theory.
- 1759: Guinness – Arthur Guinness signed a 9,000-year lease on the St. James's Gate Brewery in Dublin and began brewing his signature dark stout. Guinness became one of the world's most successful beer brands and a symbol of Irish culture worldwide.

== 19th century ==
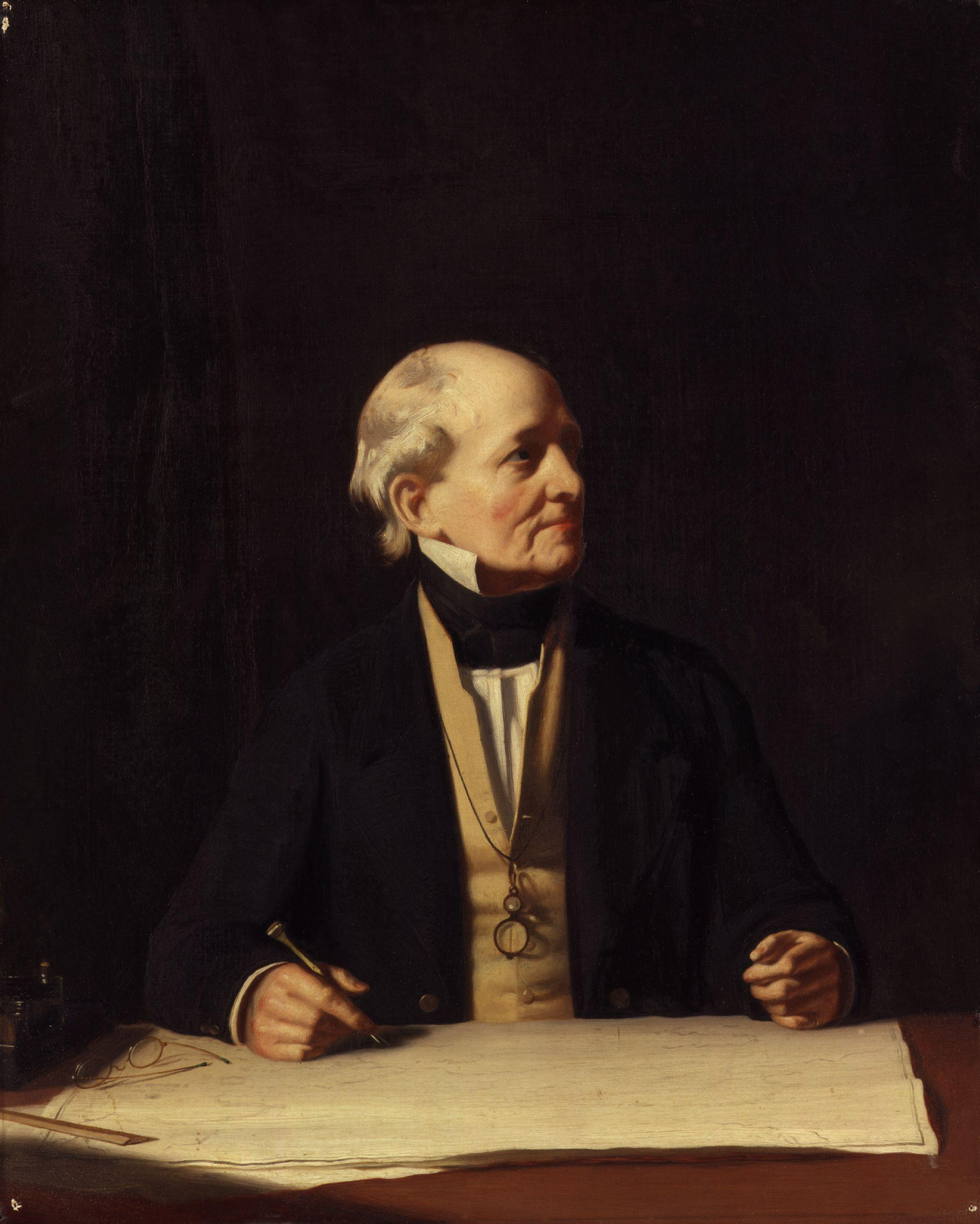
Francis Beaufort, inventor of the Beaufort wind scale

- 1805: Beaufort scale – Francis Beaufort, a hydrographer from County Meath, developed a standardised scale for measuring wind speed based on observable sea conditions. The scale, ranging from 0 (calm) to 12 (hurricane), remains in use by meteorologists and mariners worldwide.
- 1809: Milk of Magnesia – James Murray, a physician from Belfast, discovered the antacid properties of magnesium hydroxide suspension. Originally called "fluid magnesia", the preparation became a widely used treatment for indigestion and constipation.
- 1813: Clanny safety lamp – William Reid Clanny, a physician from Bangor, County Down, invented one of the first safety lamps for use in coal mines. His design preceded the more famous Davy lamp and helped reduce the risk of explosions caused by open flames igniting methane gas.
- 1820: Trinity Peninsula – Edward Bransfield, a naval officer from Cork, made the first confirmed sighting of the Antarctic Peninsula (now called Trinity Peninsula) on 30 January 1820. This discovery is considered one of the first verified sightings of the Antarctic mainland.
- 1820: Modern bacon curing – Henry Denny, a Waterford butcher, developed the modern method of dry-curing bacon and invented the bacon rasher. His techniques transformed bacon from a heavily salted preservation method into a culinary product.
- 1821: Extra Stout – Arthur Guinness II and brewers at St. James's Gate developed "Extra Superior Porter", which evolved into the dry stout style now synonymous with Guinness. The use of roasted barley gave the beer its distinctive dark colour and bitter flavour.
- 1830: Coffey still – Aeneas Coffey, a Dublin excise officer, patented an improved continuous still that revolutionised whiskey and spirit production. The Coffey still (also called the column still or patent still) enabled continuous distillation, producing a lighter spirit more efficiently than traditional pot stills.
- 1831: Cholera treatment – William Brooke O'Shaughnessy, a physician from Limerick, pioneered intravenous therapy by proposing the injection of saline solutions to treat cholera patients suffering from severe dehydration. This revolutionary approach laid the foundation for modern IV fluid therapy.
- 1832: Kyanising – John Howard Kyan patented a process for preserving wood using mercuric chloride solution. This was one of the first effective wood preservation techniques and helped extend the life of railway sleepers and telegraph poles.
- 1834: Croquet – The modern game of croquet was developed in Ireland, with the first recorded rules appearing in the 1850s. The game spread to England and became a popular Victorian pastime before gaining international recognition.

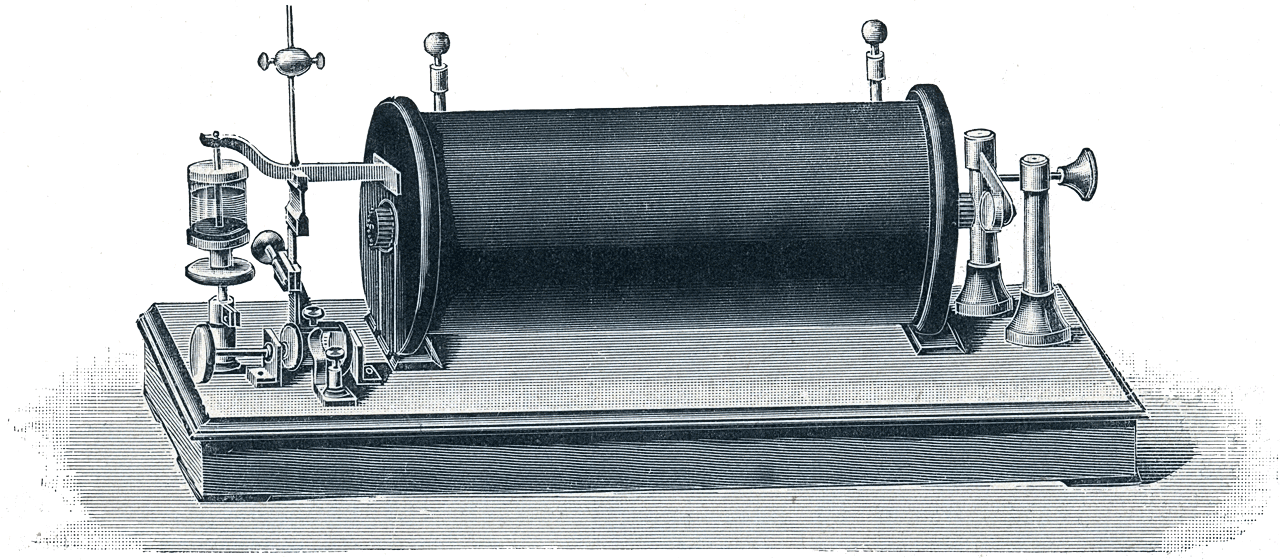
An induction coil, invented by Nicholas Callan

- 1836: Induction coil – Nicholas Callan, a priest and scientist at Maynooth College, invented the induction coil, a type of electrical transformer that could produce high voltages from a low-voltage source. His largest coil could generate sparks up to 15 inches long and became essential for early X-ray machines and radio transmitters.
- 1838: Screw-pile lighthouse – Alexander Mitchell, a blind engineer from Belfast, invented the screw-pile foundation for lighthouses. His innovation allowed structures to be built on unstable seabeds and riverbanks, enabling lighthouse construction in locations previously considered impossible.

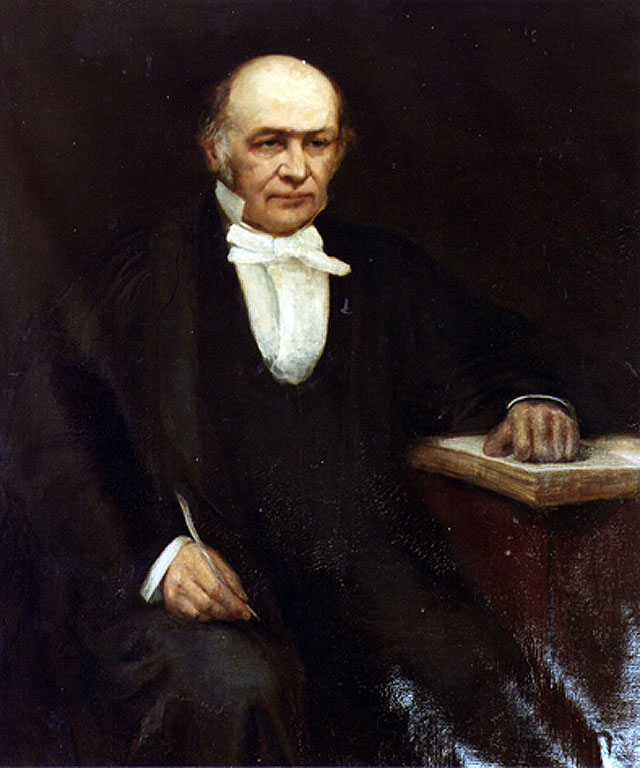
William Rowan Hamilton, discoverer of quaternions

- 1843: Quaternions – William Rowan Hamilton, an astronomer, mathematician and director of Dunsink Observatory from Dublin, discovered quaternions while walking along the Royal Canal. This four-dimensional number system extended complex numbers and proved essential for describing rotations in three-dimensional space. Hamilton famously carved the fundamental formula into Broom Bridge.
- 1844: Hypodermic needle – Francis Rynd, a Dublin physician, invented the hollow hypodermic needle and performed the first recorded subcutaneous injection. He used the device to inject morphine near nerves for pain relief, pioneering a technique that transformed medicine.
- 1846: Cup anemometer – Thomas Romney Robinson, an astronomer at Armagh Observatory, invented the spinning-cup anemometer for measuring wind speed. His design, using four hemispherical cups mounted on horizontal arms, remained the standard for meteorological wind measurement for over a century.

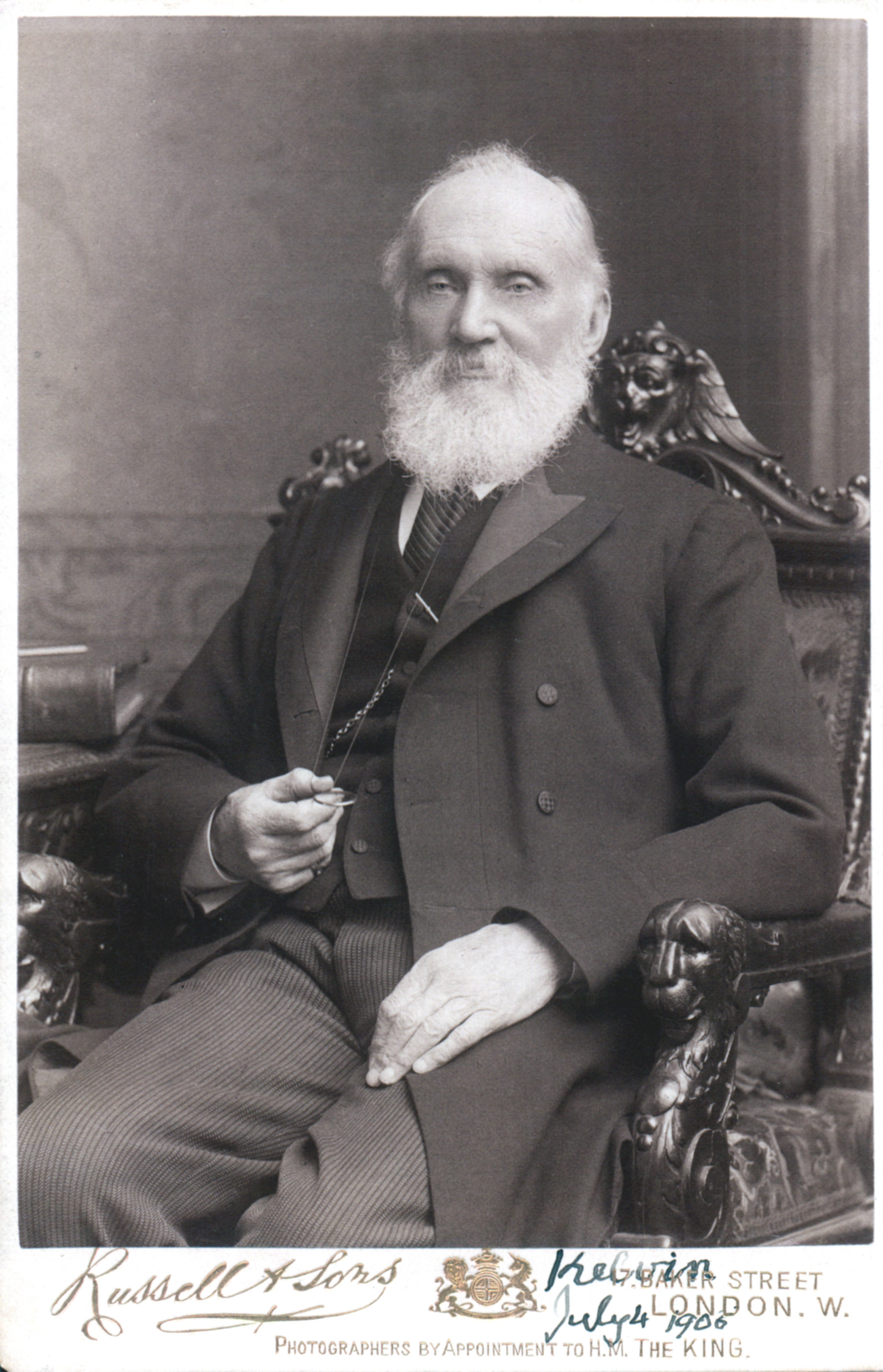
Lord Kelvin, inventor of the Kelvin temperature scale

- 1848: Kelvin scale – William Thomson (later Lord Kelvin), born in Belfast, proposed an absolute temperature scale based on the laws of thermodynamics. The Kelvin scale, with its zero point at absolute zero (−273.15 °C), became the SI base unit for temperature.
- 1851: Binaural stethoscope – Arthur Leared, a Dublin physician, invented the binaural stethoscope with two earpieces, allowing physicians to hear heart and lung sounds in both ears simultaneously. This design, later refined by George Cammann, became the standard medical stethoscope still in use today.
- 1856: Icosian calculus – William Rowan Hamilton developed the icosian calculus, an early example of graph theory exploring paths along the edges of a dodecahedron. His "Icosian game" challenged players to find a Hamiltonian path, a problem that remains important in computer science and mathematics.
- 1857: Isoseismal map – Robert Mallet, a Dublin engineer and geophysicist, created the first modern isoseismal map following the 1857 Basilicata earthquake in Italy. These maps, showing lines of equal seismic intensity, became fundamental tools in seismology.

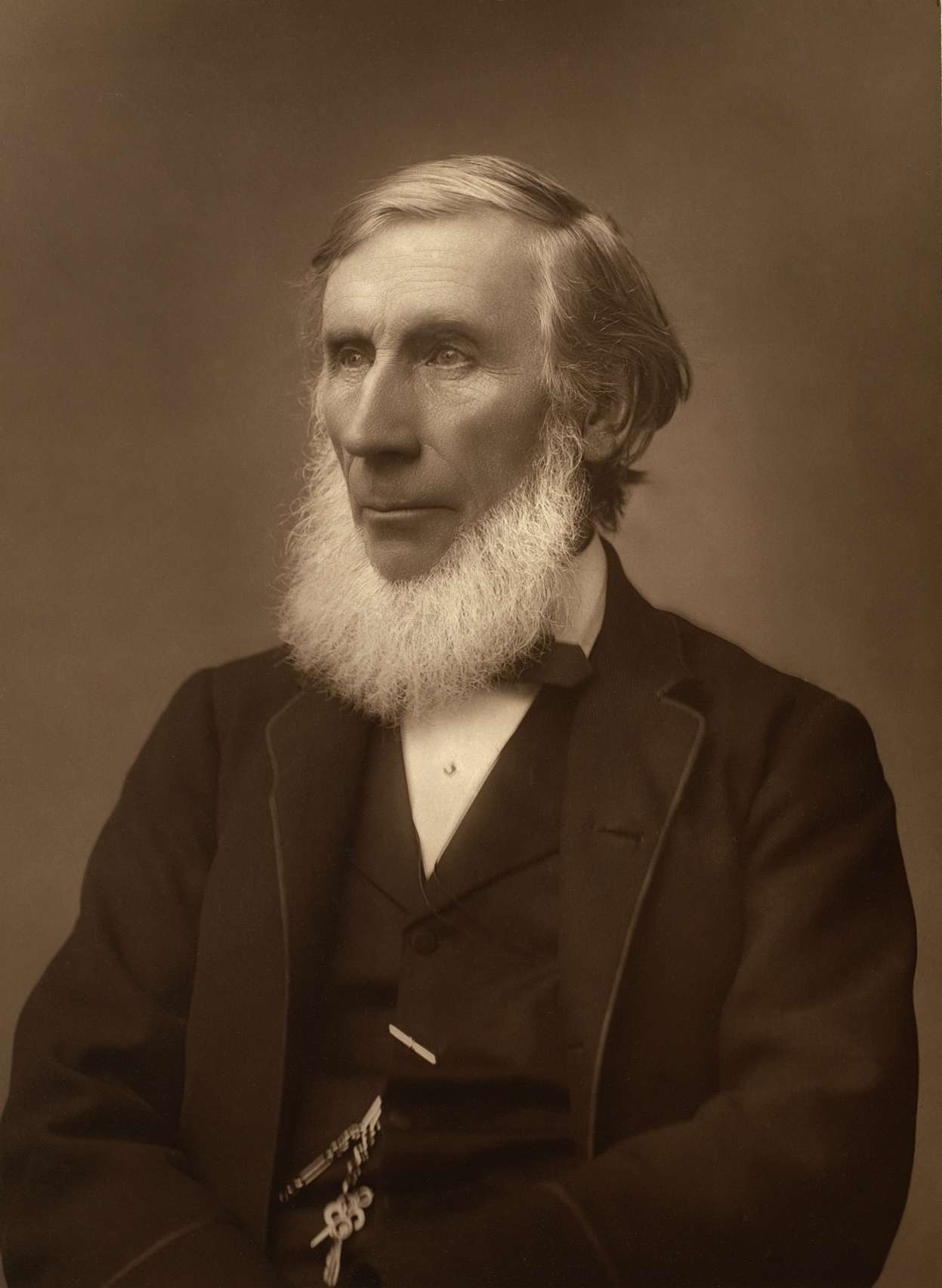
John Tyndall, who proved the greenhouse effect

- 1859: Greenhouse effect – John Tyndall, a physicist from County Carlow, experimentally demonstrated that gases such as water vapour and carbon dioxide absorb infrared radiation. His work provided the first scientific proof of the greenhouse effect and laid the foundation for climate science.
- 1864: Capnography – John Tyndall developed techniques for measuring carbon dioxide in exhaled breath using infrared spectroscopy. This pioneering work led to the development of capnography, now essential for monitoring patients under anaesthesia.
- 1865: Transatlantic telegraph cable – William Thomson (Lord Kelvin) made crucial contributions to the first successful transatlantic telegraph cable, landed at Valentia Island, County Kerry. His work on signal transmission theory and mirror galvanometer design solved problems that had doomed earlier attempts.
- 1866: Standard drop – Samuel Haughton, a Dublin clergyman and scientist, calculated the optimal drop length for judicial hanging to cause rapid death by cervical fracture rather than slow strangulation. While macabre, his research was intended to make execution more humane.
- 1871: Fireman's respirator – John Tyndall invented a respirator to protect firefighters from smoke and toxic gases. His design used layers of cotton wool, charcoal, and lime to filter the air and served as a precursor to modern gas masks.
- 1877: Brennan torpedo – Louis Brennan, an engineer from Castlebar, County Mayo, invented the world's first practical guided missile. The Brennan torpedo was steered by wire from shore and could travel up to 2,000 yards, making it an effective harbour defence weapon.
- 1879: Hurling rules – The Irish Hurling Union was founded in Dublin and established the first standardised rules for the ancient game. These rules were later refined by the Gaelic Athletic Association in 1884.
- 1880: Boycott – The term "boycott" originated in County Mayo when tenant farmers organised by the Irish Land League refused to work for or interact with Captain Charles Boycott, a land agent. Charles Stewart Parnell championed this tactic of social ostracism as an alternative to violence.
- 1881: Stoney units – George Johnstone Stoney, a physicist from Birr, County Offaly, proposed a system of natural units based on fundamental physical constants. His work anticipated Planck units and contributed to the conceptualisation of fundamental physics.
- 1883: Electromagnetic radiation production – George Francis FitzGerald, a Dublin physicist, proposed the first practical method for generating radio waves using oscillating electrical circuits. His theoretical work, building on Maxwell's equations, helped pave the way for wireless telegraphy.
- 1885: Cream cracker – Joseph Haughton, a Dublin baker, invented the cream cracker at the W. & R. Jacob biscuit company. Despite the name, the crackers contain no cream; they were so named because the dough was creamed (mixed thoroughly) during preparation.
- 1886: Graphophone – Chichester Bell, cousin of Alexander Graham Bell and son of a Derry family, co-invented the graphophone with Charles Sumner Tainter. This improved on Edison's phonograph by using a wax-coated cylinder rather than tinfoil, producing better sound quality.
- 1888: Gregg shorthand – John Robert Gregg, born in Monaghan, developed a system of phonetic shorthand that became the dominant form in the English-speaking world. Unlike earlier systems based on geometric shapes, Gregg shorthand uses cursive strokes that flow naturally, enabling faster writing speeds.
- 1889: Length contraction – George Francis FitzGerald proposed that objects contract in the direction of motion through the luminiferous aether, explaining the null result of the Michelson–Morley experiment. This FitzGerald–Lorentz contraction became a cornerstone of special relativity.
- 1891: Electron – George Johnstone Stoney coined the term "electron" for the fundamental unit of electrical charge, years before J. J. Thomson discovered the particle experimentally in 1897. Stoney's theoretical work helped establish the concept of quantised electric charge.
- 1894: Cohesion-tension theory – Henry Horatio Dixon and John Joly at Trinity College Dublin discovered how water rises in plants through the cohesive properties of water molecules and the tension created by evaporation from leaves. This solved a fundamental mystery of plant physiology.
- 1894: Joly colour screen – John Joly invented an early colour photography process using a ruled screen of red, green, and blue lines. This additive colour method was one of the first practical techniques for colour photography.

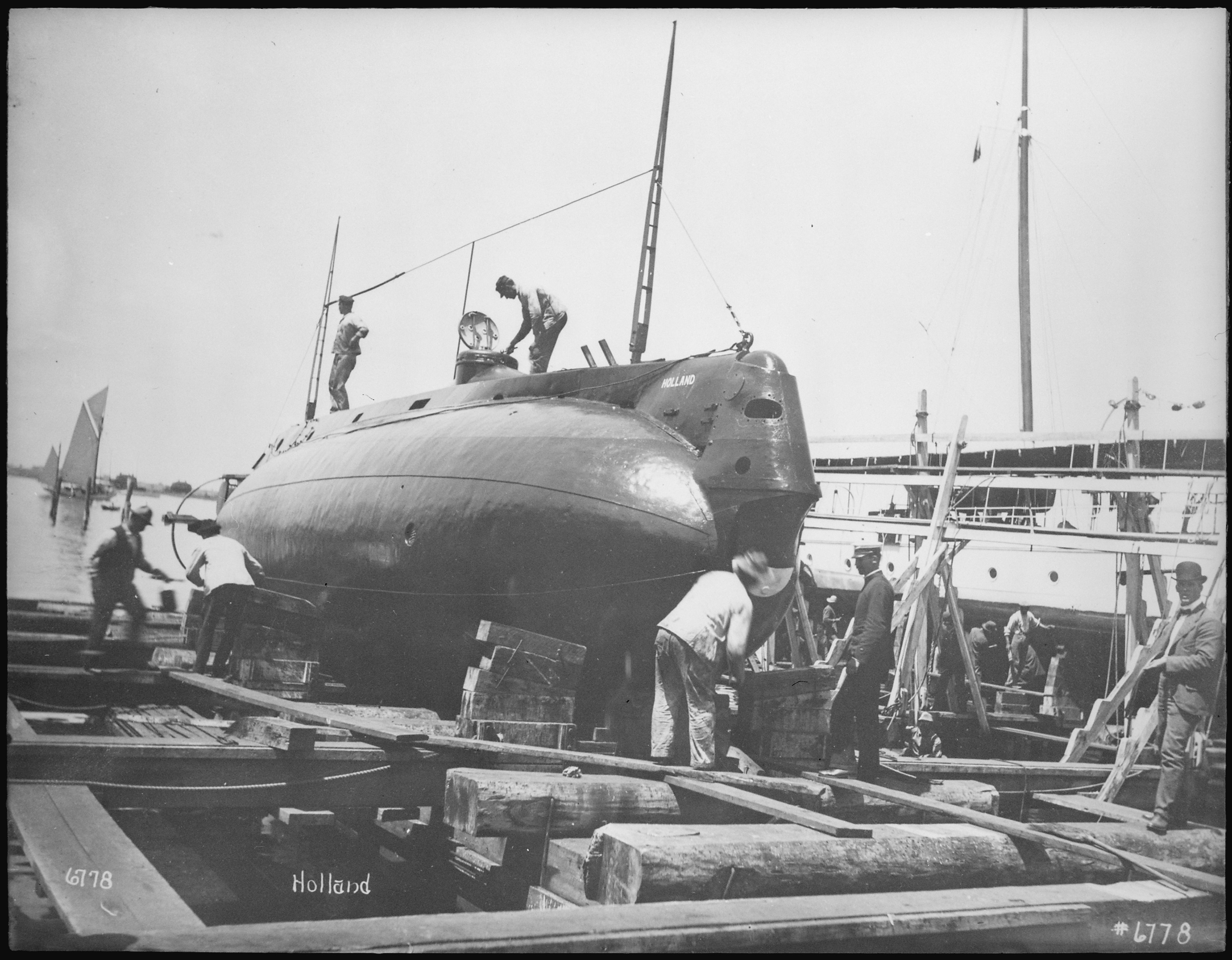
USS Holland (SS-1), the first modern submarine

- 1897: Holland VI – John Philip Holland, an engineer from Liscannor, County Clare, designed the first modern submarine to be commissioned by the United States Navy. His design, featuring internal combustion engines for surface travel and electric motors for underwater propulsion, established the template for submarines throughout the 20th century.
- 1897: Townsend discharge – John Sealy Townsend, a physicist from Galway, discovered the ionisation cascade process by which electrical discharge occurs in gases. His work on electron avalanches became fundamental to understanding plasma physics and gas discharge devices.

== 20th century ==
- 1900: Reflector sight – Howard Grubb, an optical engineer from Dublin, invented the reflector sight for aiming weapons. His collimating gun sight projected a reticle at infinity, allowing the shooter to keep both eyes open and aim without parallax error.
- 1905: Underground conveyor belt – Richard Sutcliffe, an engineer from County Leitrim, invented the first practical conveyor belt system for underground coal mining. His innovation transformed the mining industry by enabling continuous transport of coal from the coal face to the surface.
- 1909: Irish logarithm – Percy Ludgate, a Dublin accountant, designed the second mechanical computer in history (after Babbage's Analytical Engine). His design used an innovative logarithmic multiplication technique that reduced the complexity of mechanical calculation.
- 1914: 'Dublin method' in radiation therapy – John Joly, working at Trinity College Dublin, developed a technique for implanting radioactive sources directly into tumours. This approach to brachytherapy improved cancer treatment outcomes and influenced subsequent developments in radiotherapy.

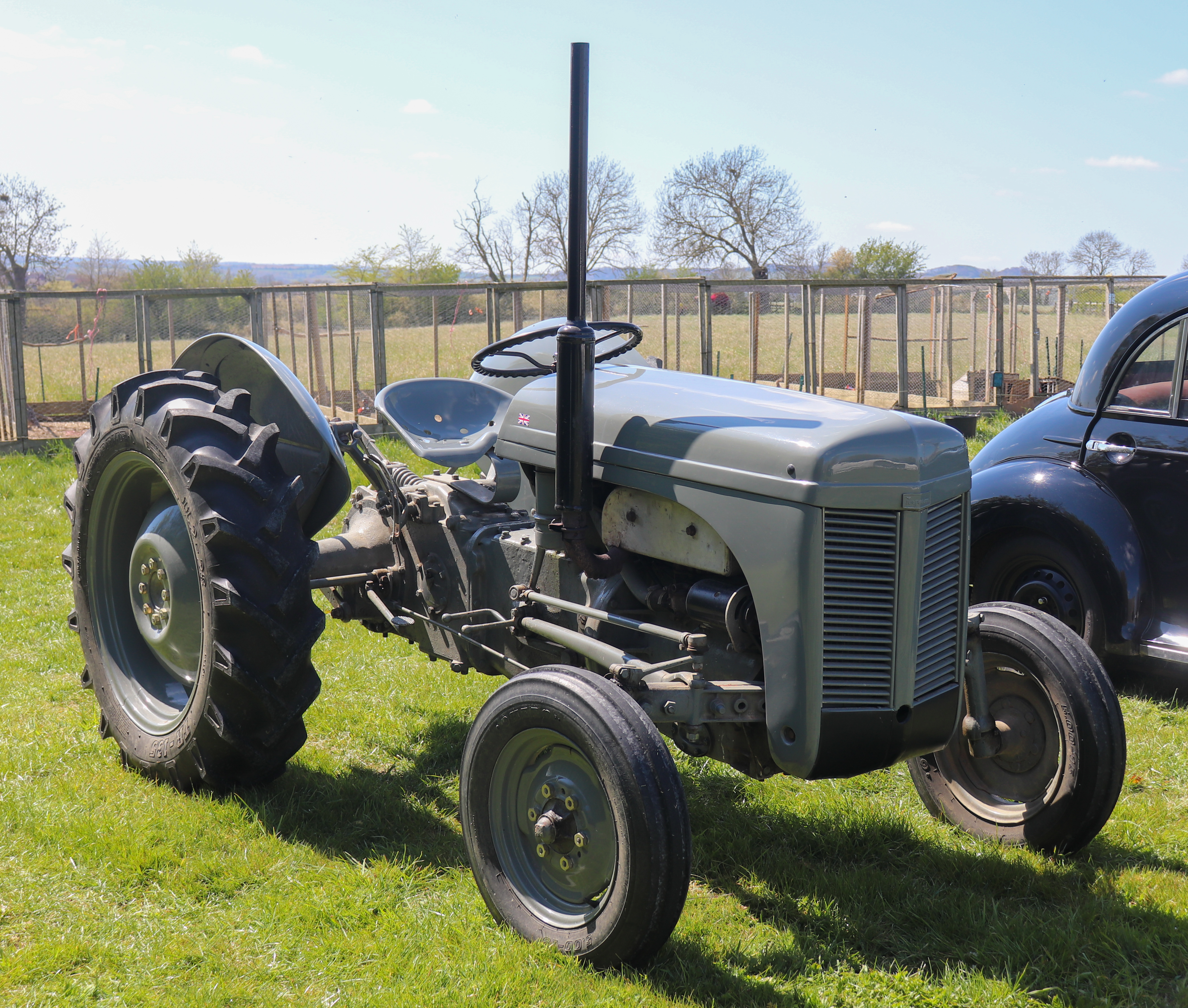
A Ferguson tractor with three-point linkage

- 1926: Three-point linkage – Harry Ferguson, an engineer from Dromore, County Down, invented the three-point hitch system for attaching implements to tractors. His hydraulic linkage allowed implements to be raised, lowered, and controlled precisely, revolutionising agricultural mechanisation.
- 1927: Variant colonies of Staphylococcus aureus – Joseph Warwick Bigger and his students at Trinity College Dublin discovered small colony variants of Staphylococcus aureus, which show altered metabolic characteristics and increased antibiotic resistance. This discovery remains relevant to understanding persistent bacterial infections.
- 1931: Drumm Battery Train – James J. Drumm, a chemist from Dundalk, developed a rechargeable nickel-zinc battery that powered electric trains on the Dublin–Bray railway line. The Drumm battery trains operated successfully until 1949 and represented an early experiment in electric mass transit.
- 1931: Sudocrem – Thomas Smith, a Dublin pharmacist, developed this antiseptic healing cream, originally called "Smith's Cream". The zinc oxide-based formulation became one of the most widely used nappy rash treatments in the UK and Ireland.

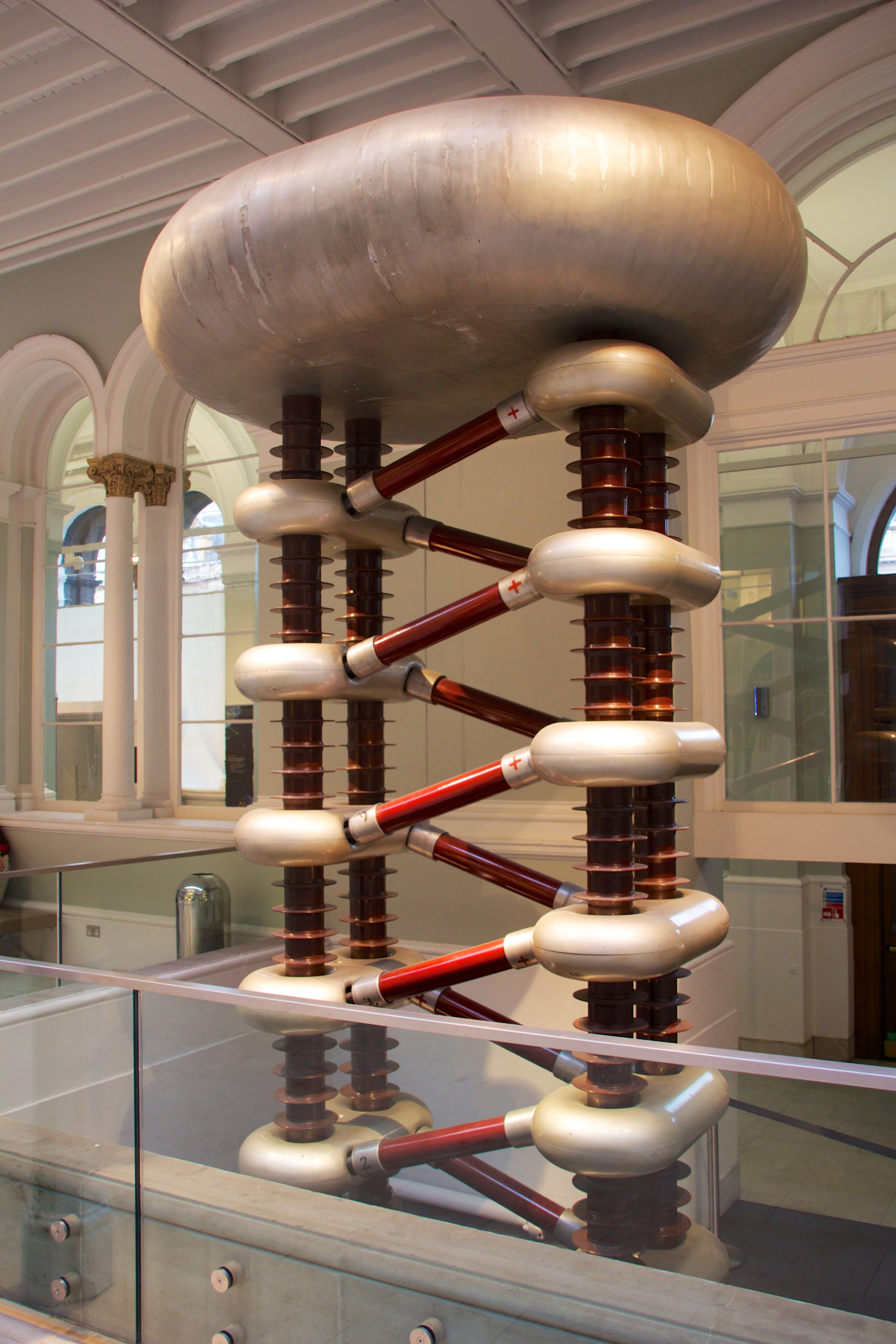
The Cockcroft-Walton accelerator used to first split the atom

- 1932: Splitting the atom – Ernest Walton, a physicist from Dungarvan, County Waterford, along with John Cockcroft, became the first to artificially disintegrate an atomic nucleus using a particle accelerator. They bombarded lithium with accelerated protons, producing helium nuclei. This achievement earned them the 1951 Nobel Prize in Physics.

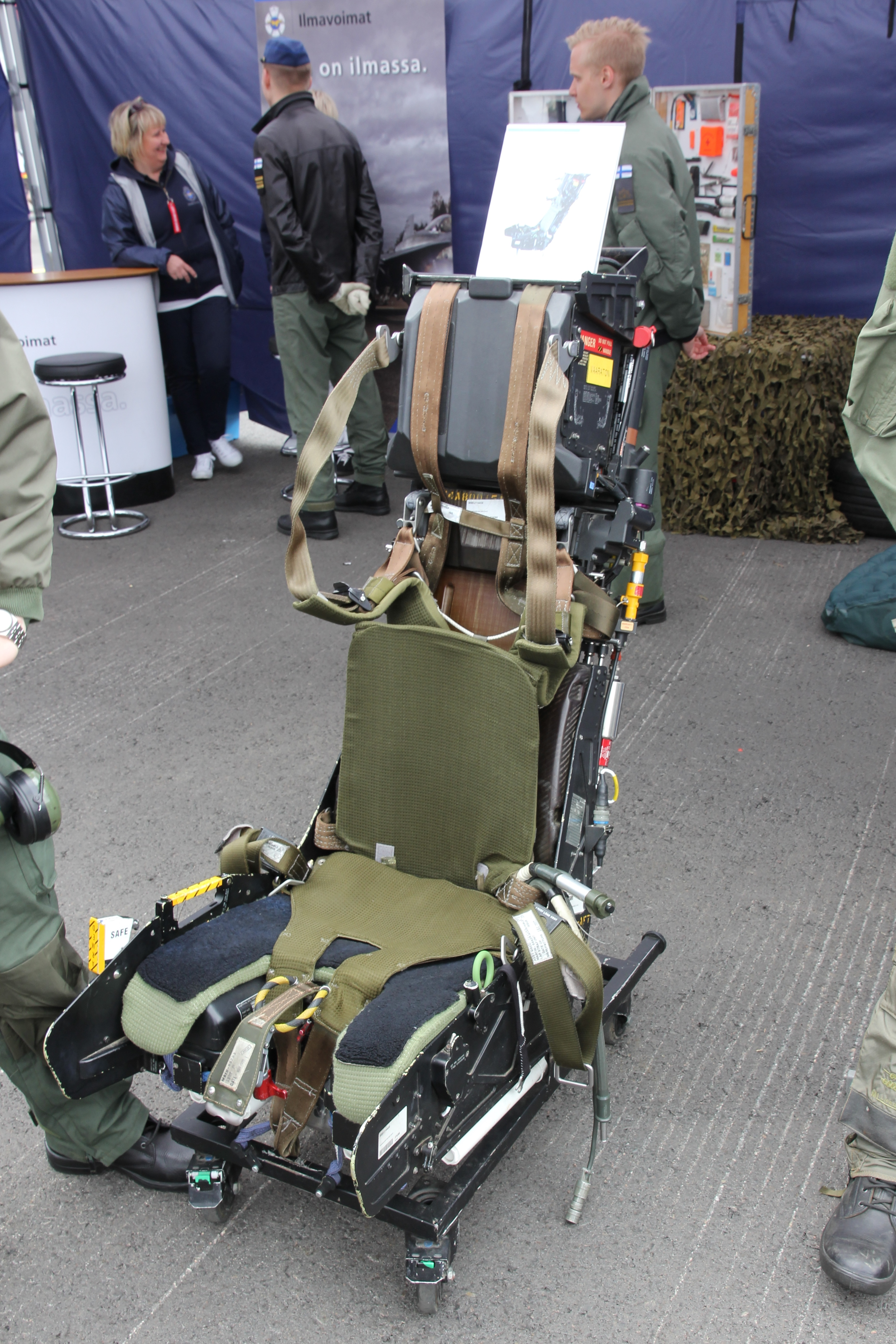
A Martin-Baker ejection seat

- 1946: Ejection seat – James Martin, an engineer from Crossgar, County Down, conducted the first live test of his reliable ejection seat, which became the standard for military aircraft worldwide. Martin-Baker ejection seats have since saved over 7,700 aircrew lives.
- 1947: Duty-free shopping – Brendan O'Regan, a tourism pioneer from Sixmilebridge, County Clare, established the world's first duty-free shop at Shannon Airport. The concept of selling goods to international travellers exempt from local taxes transformed airport retail worldwide.
- 1950: Flavoured potato crisps – Joseph "Spud" Murphy, founder of Tayto crisps in Dublin, invented the process of adding seasoning to crisps during manufacturing. His cheese and onion flavoured crisps were the first commercially produced seasoned crisps in the world.
- 1954: Clofazimine – A research team led by Vincent Barry at Trinity College Dublin discovered clofazimine, an antibiotic effective against leprosy (Hansen's disease). The drug remains on the WHO Model List of Essential Medicines and has saved millions from disfigurement and disability.
- 1960s: Portable defibrillator – Frank Pantridge, a cardiologist from Hillsborough, County Down, invented the portable defibrillator for use by ambulance crews. His device, first deployed in Belfast in 1965, enabled cardiac arrest victims to be treated outside hospital and is credited with saving millions of lives.
- 1967: Pulsars – Jocelyn Bell Burnell, an astrophysicist from Lurgan, County Armagh, detected the first radio pulsar while a graduate student at Cambridge. Her discovery of these rapidly spinning neutron stars opened a new field of astrophysics, though controversially, the Nobel Prize was awarded only to her supervisor.
- 1970s: Avermectin – William C. Campbell, a parasitologist from Ramelton, County Donegal, discovered the avermectin family of anti-parasitic drugs while working at Merck. These compounds, particularly ivermectin, have been used to treat hundreds of millions of people for river blindness and elephantiasis. Campbell shared the 2015 Nobel Prize in Physiology or Medicine for this work.
- 1993: Colour Catcher – Patrick McNamee, a chemist from Cork, invented the Colour Catcher laundry sheet, which absorbs loose dyes in the wash to prevent colour transfer between garments. The product became a household staple in Europe.

== 21st century ==
- 2003: Sugru – Jane Ní Dhulchaointigh, a designer from Kilkenny, invented Sugru, a mouldable silicone rubber that cures at room temperature to form a flexible, durable material. The product can be used to repair, modify, or improve everyday objects and has been adopted by makers and DIY enthusiasts worldwide.

== See also ==
- List of Irish dishes
- Science and technology in Europe
