= Jane Ní Dhulchaointigh =

Irish artist and inventor

Jane ní Dhulchaointigh
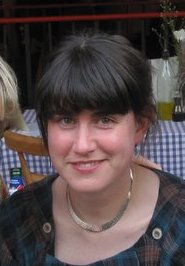
- Born: Kilkenny, Ireland
- Education: Royal College of Art 2004
- Known for: Sugru

Jane Ní Dhulchaointigh (nee gool-kwen-teekh) is an Irish artist, designer, inventor and entrepreneur. She won the 2018 European Inventor Award for Small and Medium Enterprises for Sugru, a mouldable glue that was described by Time magazine as one of the world's best inventions.

== Early life and education ==
Ní Dhulchaointigh was born in Kilkenny. She grew up on a farm and was constantly repairing broken items. She studied sculpture. At the age of 23 she moved to London to study product design at the Royal College of Art. Here she came up with the idea of Sugru, a mouldable elastomer that can be used to repair broken items. She combined bathroom sealant with wood-dust powder, which resulted in bouncy ball that looked like wood. She graduated in 2004.

== Career ==
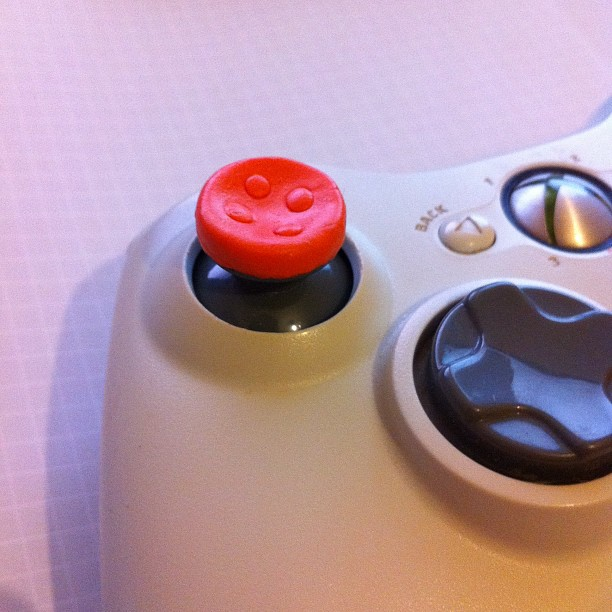
The joystick of an Xbox 360 controller that has been fixed with Sugru

She partnered with James Carrigan and Roger Ashby to found the company FormFormForm in 2005 and develop Sugru. She spent 8,000 hours in the lab developing the product, working with silicone scientists. She demonstrated an early product at Electric Picnic. She won a £35,000 grant from Nesta. They ran out of funding in 2008, and used social media and crowdfunding to raise enough money to buy machinery, develop packaging and design a website. They went on to secure £250,000 from Lacomp PLC in 2006. The product eventually launched in December 2009 and sold out within 6 hours. They were featured in Boing Boing and Wired. She named Sugru after the Irish word súgradh, which means 'play'.

Sugru was sold in over 6,000 shops worldwide, and was named in 2010 Time magazine as one of the world's best inventions. She delivered a Ted Talk at TEDxDublin in 2012. Ní Dhulchaointigh was named as the Design Entrepreneur of the year by the London Design Festival in 2013. She launched Sugru in B&Q shops across the UK and Ireland using a YouTube video to tell their customers about their product.

By 2013, Sugru had been used on all seven continents. Ní Dhulchaointigh was selected by EY as one of their top entrepreneurs of the year. She was invited to give a keynote at 99U at the Lincoln Center for the Performing Arts. Her keynote, The Magic Is in The Process, discussed the six-year process from hmmm to eureka and wow!. They developed a foil handle for fencers with fencing equipment manufacturer Leon Paul. In 2014 Sugru was described by The Guardian as a "wonder material". FormFormForm was estimated to turn over £3.6 million a year in 2016.

Ní Dhulchaointigh spoke at InspireFest in 2017, where she estimated that Sugru had been used to fix more than ten million items. They launched a Family-Safe formula that allows children to get involved with making. She won the 2018 European Inventor Award for Small and Medium Enterprises. She is the first Irish person to win a European Inventor Award in the history of the prize.

The company sold to Tesa SE in 2018 for £7.6 million. She is part of the Awesome Foundation, who donate £1,000 into a different idea every month. From 2023, she has been a director on the board of the Irish home building non-profit Common Knowledge.
