= Silicone =

Family of polymers

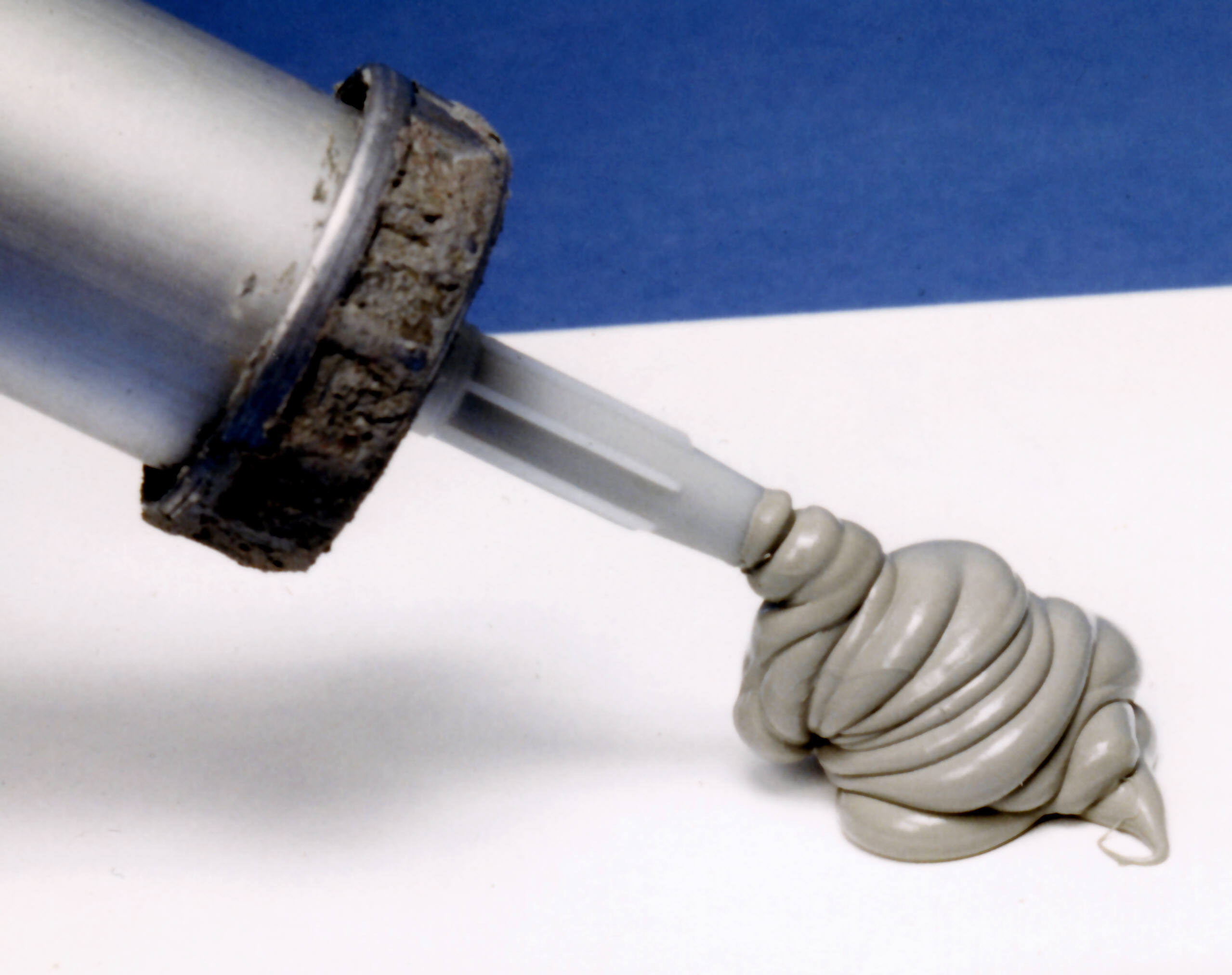
Silicone caulk can be used as a basic sealant against water and air penetration.

A silicone or polysiloxane is a polymer composed of repeating units of siloxane (−O−SiR_{2}−O−SiR_{2}−, where "R" stands for an organic group). They are typically colorless oils or rubber-like substances. Silicones are used in sealants, adhesives, lubricants, medicine, cooking utensils, thermal insulation, and electrical insulation. Some common forms include silicone oil, grease, rubber, resin, and caulk. From the chemical perspective, silicones are unusual because they feature inorganic backbones, composed only of Si and O, but they have properties of organic polymers. They represent one of the main applications of organosilicon chemistry.

Silicone is often confused with one of its constituent elements, silicon. Silicon, a hard gray solid, is used to make integrated circuits ("electronic chips") and solar cells. In contrast, silicones, which tend to be electrical insulators, are often colorless oils or rubbery resin.

== History ==
F. S. Kipping coined the word silicone in 1901 to describe the formula of polydiphenylsiloxane, Ph_{2}SiO (Ph = phenyl, C_{6}H_{5}), by analogy with the formula of the ketone benzophenone, Ph_{2}CO (his term was originally silicoketone). Kipping was well aware that polydiphenylsiloxane is polymeric whereas benzophenone is monomeric and noted the contrasting properties of Ph_{2}SiO and Ph_{2}CO. The discovery of the structural differences between Kipping's molecules and the ketones means that silicone is no longer the correct term (though it remains in common usage) and that the term siloxane is preferred according to the nomenclature of modern chemistry.

James Franklin Hyde was an American chemist and inventor. He has been called the "Father of Silicones" and is credited with the launch of the silicone industry in the 1930s. His most notable contributions include his creation of silicone from silicon compounds and his method of making fused silica, a high-quality glass later used in aeronautics, advanced telecommunications, and computer chips. His work led to the formation of Dow Corning, an alliance between the Dow Chemical Company and Corning Glass Works that was specifically created to produce silicone products.

Alfred Stock and Carl Somiesky examined the hydrolysis of dichlorosilane, a reaction that was proposed to initially give the monomer H_{2}SiO:

SiH_{2}Cl_{2} + H_{2}O → H_{2}SiO + 2 HCl

The reaction occurs below 0 °C. The reaction produces a mixture of cyclic siloxanes with the pentamer [H_{2}SiO]_{5} and hexamer [H_{2}SiO]_{6} predominating. The hydrolysis of Si(CH_{3})_{2}Cl_{2}, relevant to modern siloxane technology, proceeds more slowly.

== Synthesis ==
Highlight of a crosslink in a silicone material.

The most common silicones are composed mostly of polydimethylsiloxane (PDMS). PDMS is derived by hydrolysis of dimethyldichlorosilane according to the following idealized equation:

n Si(CH_{3})_{2}Cl_{2} + n H_{2}O → [Si(CH_{3})_{2}O]_{n} + 2n HCl

The polymerization typically produces linear chains terminated with Si−Cl or Si−OH (silanol) groups. Depending on conditions, the polymer can be cyclic, not a chain. Commercial routes to PDMS usually involve ring-opening polymerization of cyclic siloxanes. A representative reaction would start with hexamethyltrisiloxane:

n[Si(CH_{3})_{2}O]_{3} → [Si(CH_{3})_{2}O]_{3n}

In reality, a series of ring sizes comprise the precursor cyclic siloxanes. The reaction is typically catalyzed by base, such as an alkali metal oxide. The base must be removed when the polymerization is complete.

For some consumer applications such as caulks, silyl acetates are used instead of silyl chlorides. The hydrolysis of the acetates produces the less dangerous acetic acid (the acid found in vinegar) as the reaction product of a much slower curing process. This chemistry is used in many consumer applications, such as silicone caulk and adhesives.

n Si(CH_{3})_{2}(CH_{3}COO)_{2} + n H_{2}O → [Si(CH_{3})_{2}O]_{n} + 2n CH_{3}COOH

=== Crosslinking ===
Many silicones are crosslinked, which confers a rubbery or even hard texture. Crosslinking is achieved by the cohydrolysis of methyl trichlorosilane and dimethyldichlorosilane.

== Structure ==
Chemical structure of the silicone polydimethylsiloxane (PDMS)

All polymerized siloxanes or polysiloxanes, silicones consist of an inorganic silicon–oxygen backbone chain (···−Si−O−Si−O−Si−O−···) with two groups attached to each silicon center. The silicon center is tetrahedral. The oxygen atoms adopt a bent ether-like geometry. The R_{2}Si centers are well separated from each other, which means that the chain is particularly flexible.

By varying the −Si−O− chain lengths, organic substituents attached to silicon, and crosslinking, silicones can be synthesized with a wide variety of properties and compositions. They can vary in consistency from liquid to gel to rubber to hard plastic. The most common siloxane is linear polydimethylsiloxane (PDMS), a silicone oil. The second-largest group of silicone materials is based on silicone resins, which are formed by branched and cage-like oligosiloxanes.

== Combustion ==
When silicone is burned in air or oxygen, it forms solid silica (silicon dioxide, SiO_{2}) as a white powder, char, and various gases. The readily dispersed powder is sometimes called silica fume. The pyrolysis of certain polysiloxanes under an inert atmosphere is a valuable pathway towards the production of amorphous silicon oxycarbide ceramics, also known as polymer derived ceramics. Polysiloxanes terminated with functional ligands such as vinyl, mercapto or acrylate groups have been cross linked to yield preceramic polymers, which can be photopolymerised for the additive manufacturing of polymer derived ceramics by stereolithography techniques.

== Properties ==
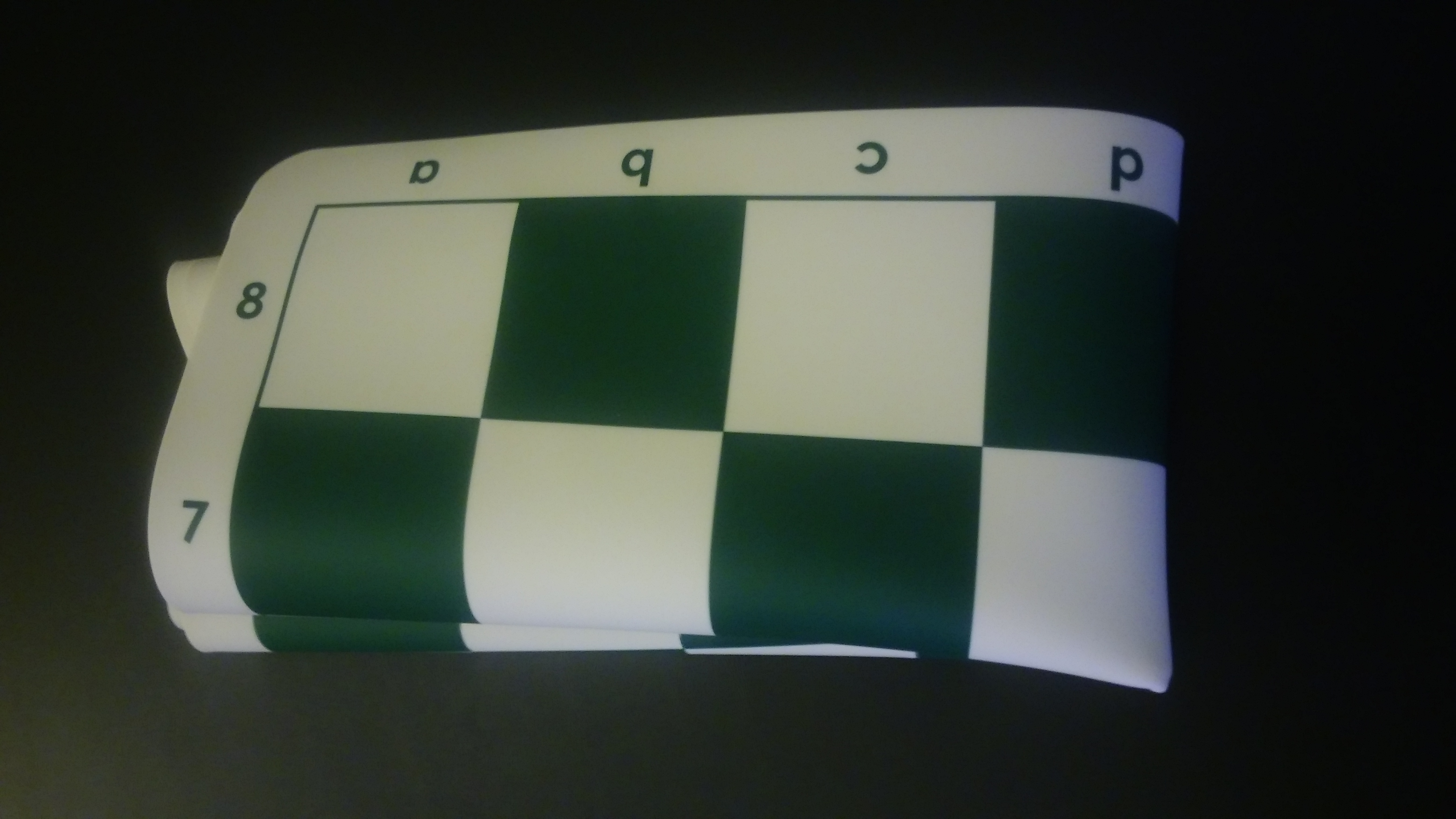
This silicone rubber folding chessboard resists creasing and wrinkling.

Silicones exhibit many useful characteristics, including:

- Low thermal conductivity
- Low chemical reactivity
- Low toxicity
- Thermal stability (constancy of properties over a wide temperature range of −100 to 250 °C)
- The ability to repel water and form watertight seals
- Does not stick to many substrates, but adheres very well to others, e.g. glass
- Does not support microbiological growth
- Resistance to creasing and wrinkling
- Resistance to oxygen, ozone, and ultraviolet (UV) light. This property has led to the widespread use of silicones in the construction industry (e.g. coatings, fire protection, glazing seals) and the automotive industry (external gaskets, external trim).
- Electrical insulation properties. Because silicone can be formulated to be electrically insulative or conductive, it is suitable for a wide range of electrical applications.
- High gas permeability: at room temperature (25 °C), the permeability of silicone rubber for such gases as oxygen is approximately 400 times that of butyl rubber, making silicone useful for medical applications in which increased aeration is desired. Conversely, silicone rubbers cannot be used where gas-tight seals are necessary such as seals for high-pressure gases or high vacuum.

Silicone can be developed into rubber sheeting, where it has other properties, such as being FDA compliant. This extends the uses of silicone sheeting to industries that demand hygiene, for example, food and beverage, and pharmaceuticals.

== Applications ==
Silicones are used in many products. Ullmann's Encyclopedia of Industrial Chemistry lists the following major categories of application: Electrical (such as insulation), electronics (such as coatings), household (such as sealants and cooking utensils), automobile (such as gaskets), airplane (such as seals), office machines (such as keyboard pads), medicine and dentistry (such as tooth impression molds), and textiles and paper (such as coatings). For these applications, an estimated 400,000 tonnes of silicones were produced in 1991. Specific examples, both large and small are presented below.

=== Automotive ===
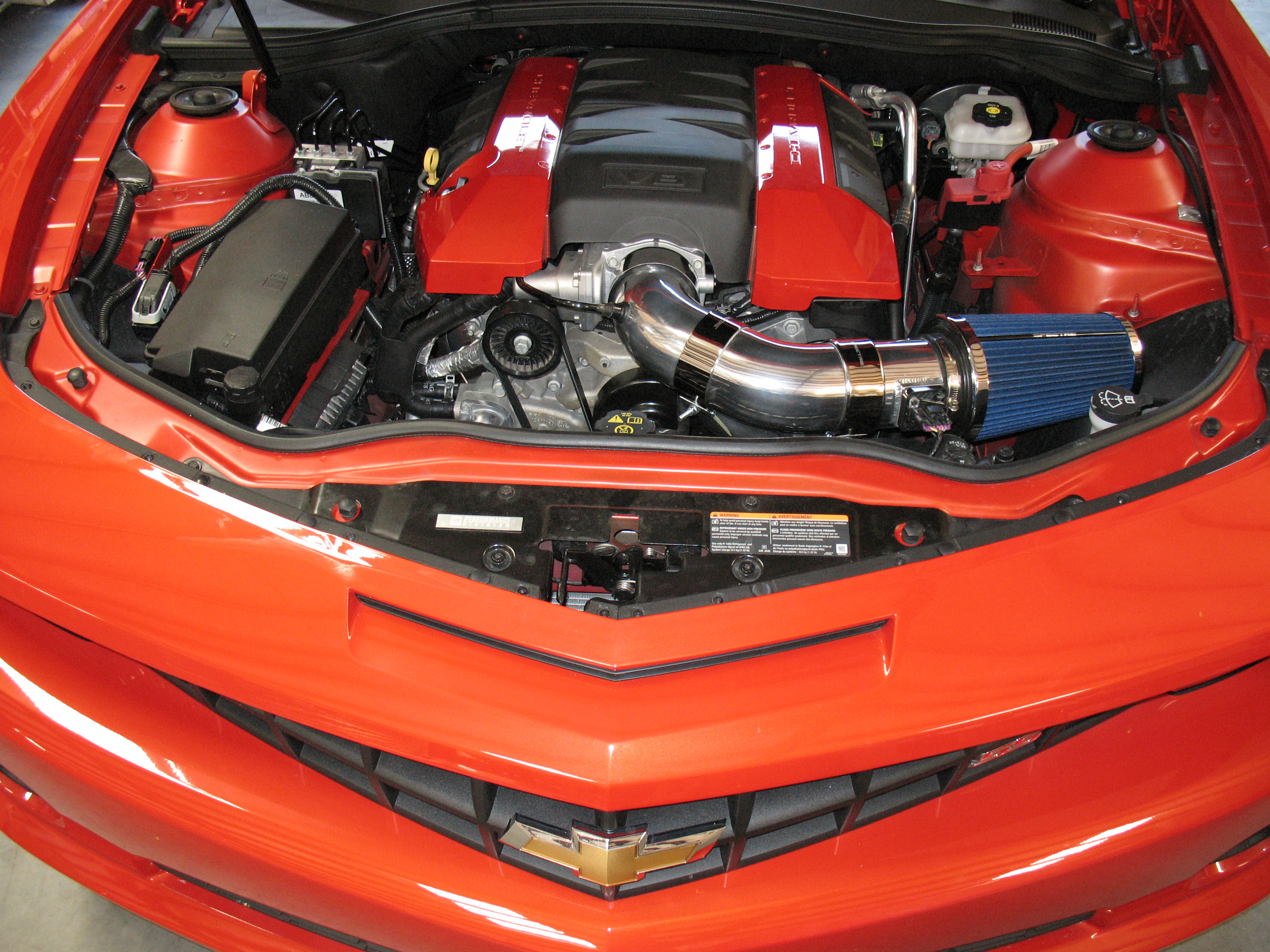
Silicone caulks and rubber components are often used in automotive applications

In the automotive field, silicone grease is typically used as a lubricant for brake components since it is stable at high temperatures, is not water-soluble, and is far less likely than other lubricants to foul. DOT 5 brake fluids are based on liquid silicones.

Automotive spark plug wires are insulated by multiple layers of silicone to prevent sparks from jumping to adjacent wires, causing misfires. Silicone tubing is sometimes used in automotive intake systems (especially for engines with forced induction).

Sheet silicone is used to manufacture gaskets used in automotive engines, transmissions, and other applications.

Silicone compounds such as silicone rubber are used as coatings and sealants for airbags; the high strength of silicone rubber makes it an optimal adhesive and sealant for high impact airbags. Silicones in combination with thermoplastics provide improvements in scratch and mar resistance and lowered coefficient of friction.

=== Aerospace ===
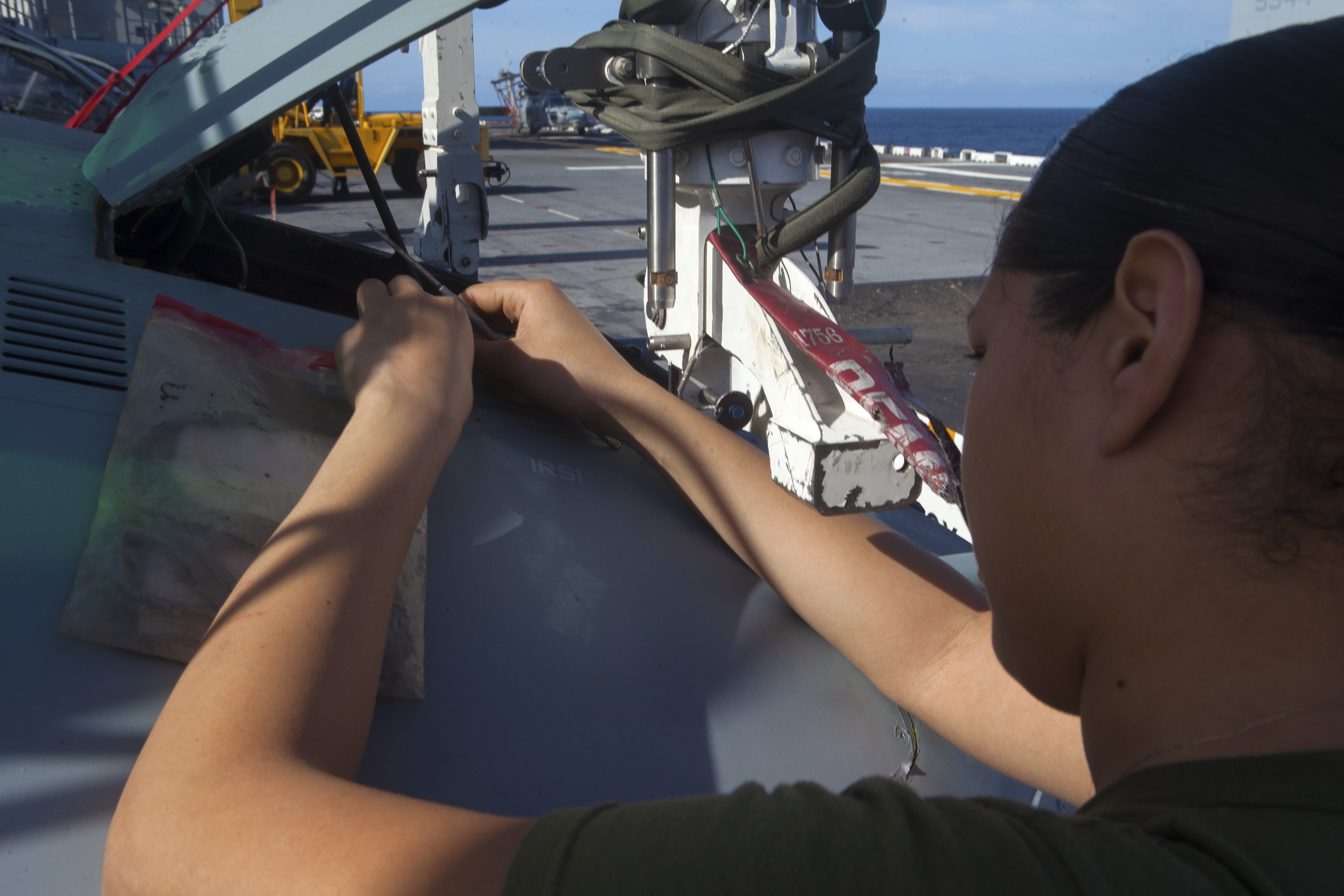
Silicone is often used to seal maintenance access openings in aerospace equipment

Silicone is a widely used material in the aerospace industry due to its sealing properties, stability across an extreme temperature range, durability, sound dampening and anti-vibration qualities, and naturally flame retardant properties.

Specially developed aerospace grades of silicone are stable from −70 to 220 °C, these grades can be used in the construction of gaskets for windows and cabin doors. During operation, aircraft go through large temperature fluctuations in a relatively short period of time; from ambient temperatures when on the ground in hot countries to sub-zero temperatures when flying at high altitude. Silicone rubber can be molded with tight tolerances ensuring gaskets form airtight seals both on the ground and in the air, where atmospheric pressure decreases.

Silicone rubber's resistance to heat corrosion enables it to be used for gaskets in aircraft engines where it will outlast other types of rubber, both improving aircraft safety and reducing maintenance costs. The silicone acts to seal instrument panels and other electrical systems in the cockpit, protecting printed circuit boards from the risks of extreme altitude such as moisture and extremely low temperature. Silicone can be used as a sheath to protect wires and electrical components from any dust or ice that may creep into a plane's inner workings.

As the nature of air travel results in much noise and vibration, powerful engines, landings, and high speeds all need to be considered to ensure passenger comfort and safe operation of the aircraft. As silicone rubber has exceptional noise reduction and anti-vibration properties, it can be formed into small components and fitted into small gaps ensuring all equipment can be protected from unwanted vibration such as overhead lockers, vent ducts, hatches, entertainment system seals, and LED lighting systems.

=== Solid propellant ===
Polydimethylsiloxane (PDMS) based binders along with ammonium perchlorate (NH_{4}ClO_{4}) are used as fast burning solid propellants in rockets.

=== Building construction ===
The strength and reliability of silicone rubber are widely acknowledged in the construction industry. One-part silicone sealants and caulks are in common use to seal gaps, joints and crevices in buildings. One-part silicones cure by absorbing atmospheric moisture, which simplifies installation. In plumbing, silicone grease is typically applied to O-rings in brass taps and valves, preventing lime from sticking to the metal.

Structural silicone has also been used in curtain wall building façades since 1974 when the Art Institute of Chicago became the first building to receive exterior glass fixed only with the material. Silicone membranes have been used to cover and restore industrial roofs, thanks to its extreme UV resistance, and ability to keep their waterproof performance for decades.

=== 3D printing ===
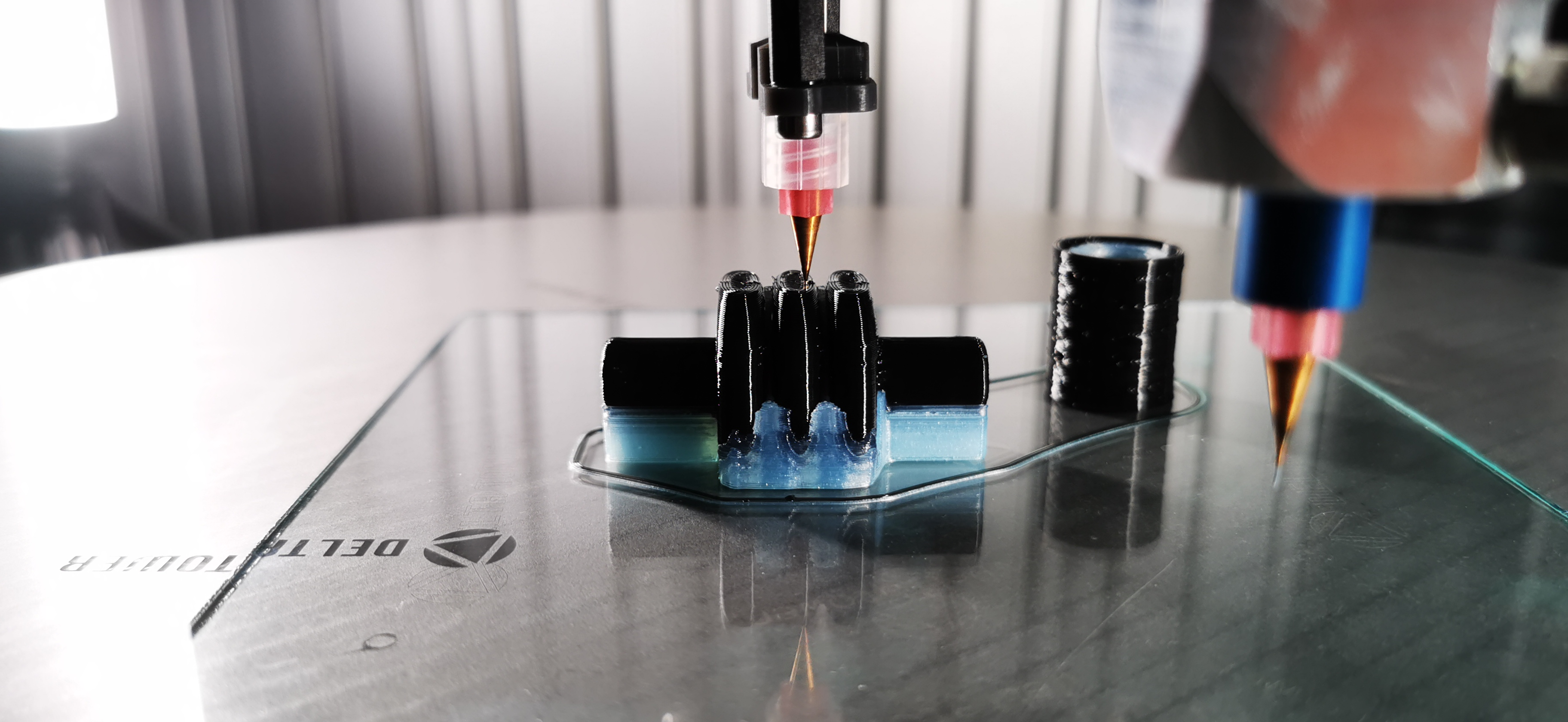
Silicone 3D print with support material

Silicone rubber can be 3D printed (liquid deposition modelling, LDM) using pump-nozzle extrusion systems. Standard silicone formulations are optimized to be used by extrusion and injection moulding machines and are not applicable in LDM-based 3D printing.

3D printing also requires the use of a removable support material that is compatible with the silicone rubber.

=== Coatings ===
Silicone films can be applied to such silica-based substrates as glass to form a covalently-bonded hydrophobic coating. Such coatings were developed for use on aircraft windshields to repel water and to preserve visibility, without requiring mechanical windshield wipers which are impractical at supersonic speeds. Similar treatments were eventually adapted to the automotive market in products marketed by Rain-X and others.

Many fabrics can be coated or impregnated with silicone to form a strong, waterproof composite such as silnylon.

A silicone polymer can be suspended in water by using stabilizing surfactants. This allows water-based formulations to be used to deliver many ingredients that would otherwise require a stronger solvent, or be too viscous to use effectively. For example, a waterborne formulation using a silane's reactivity and penetration ability into a mineral-based surface can be combined with water-beading properties from a siloxane to produce a more-useful surface protection product.

=== Cookware ===
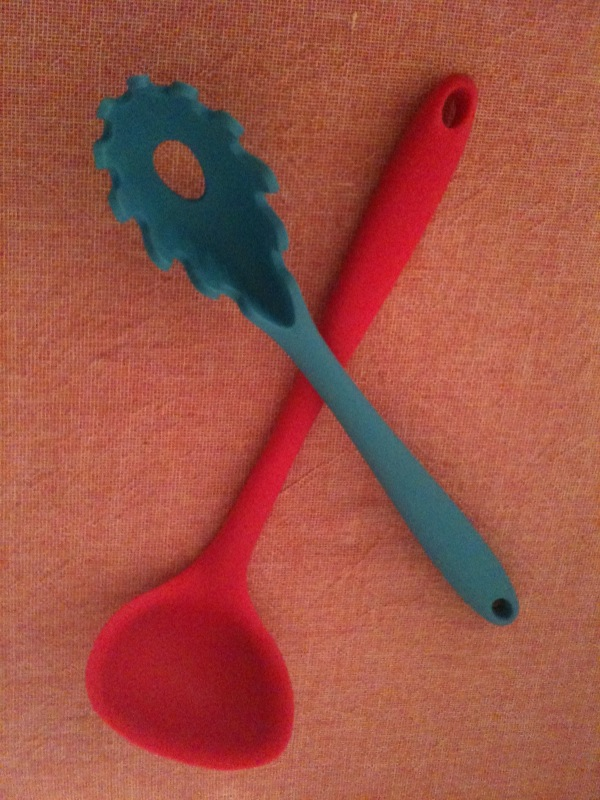
Soup ladle and pasta ladle made of silicone

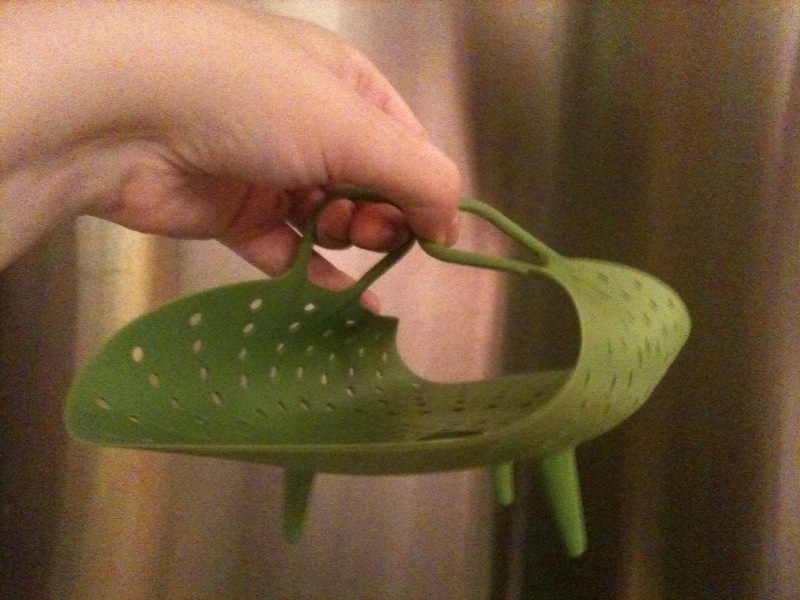
A silicone food steamer to be placed inside a pot of boiling water

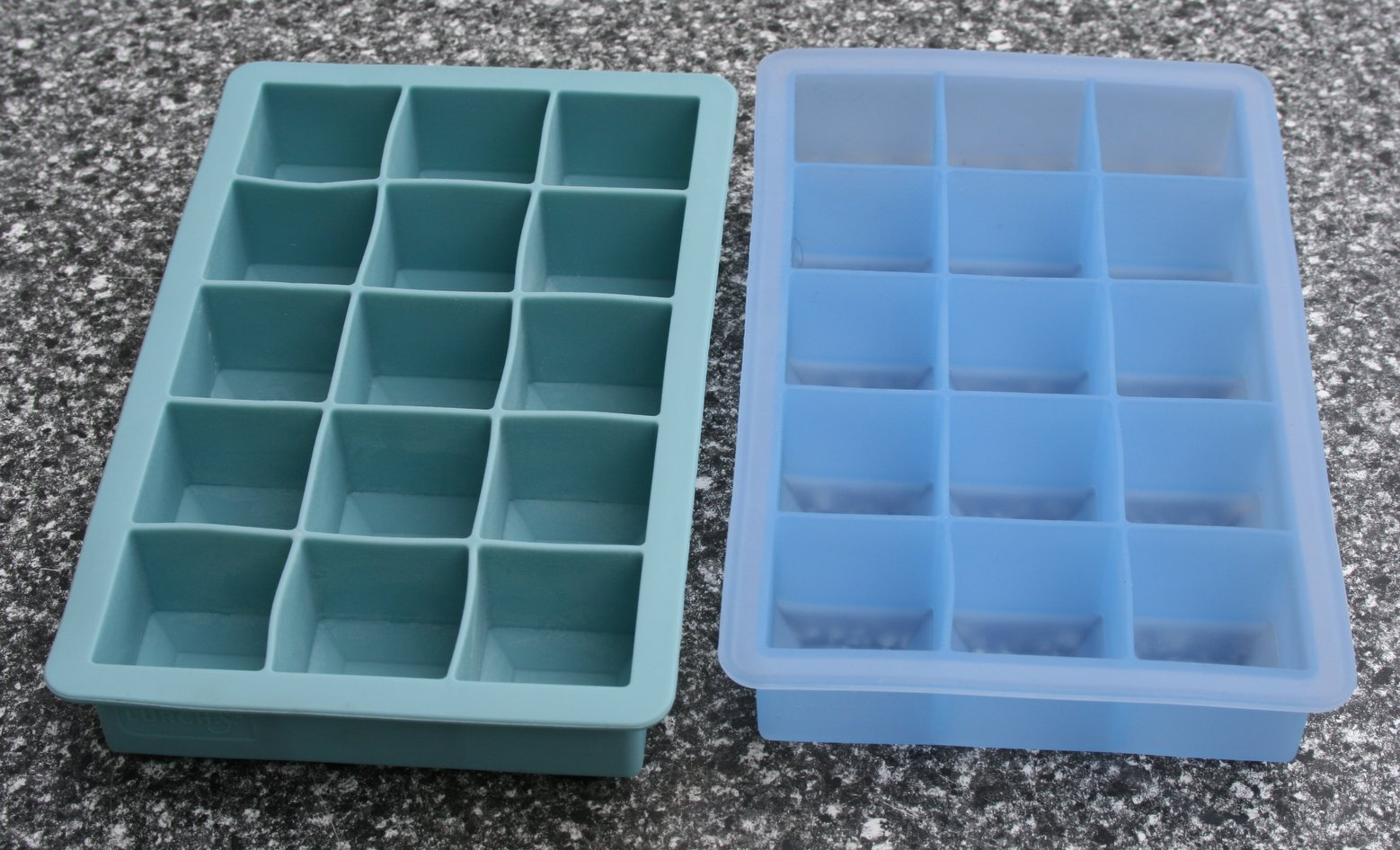
Flexible ice cube trays made of silicone allow easy extraction of ice

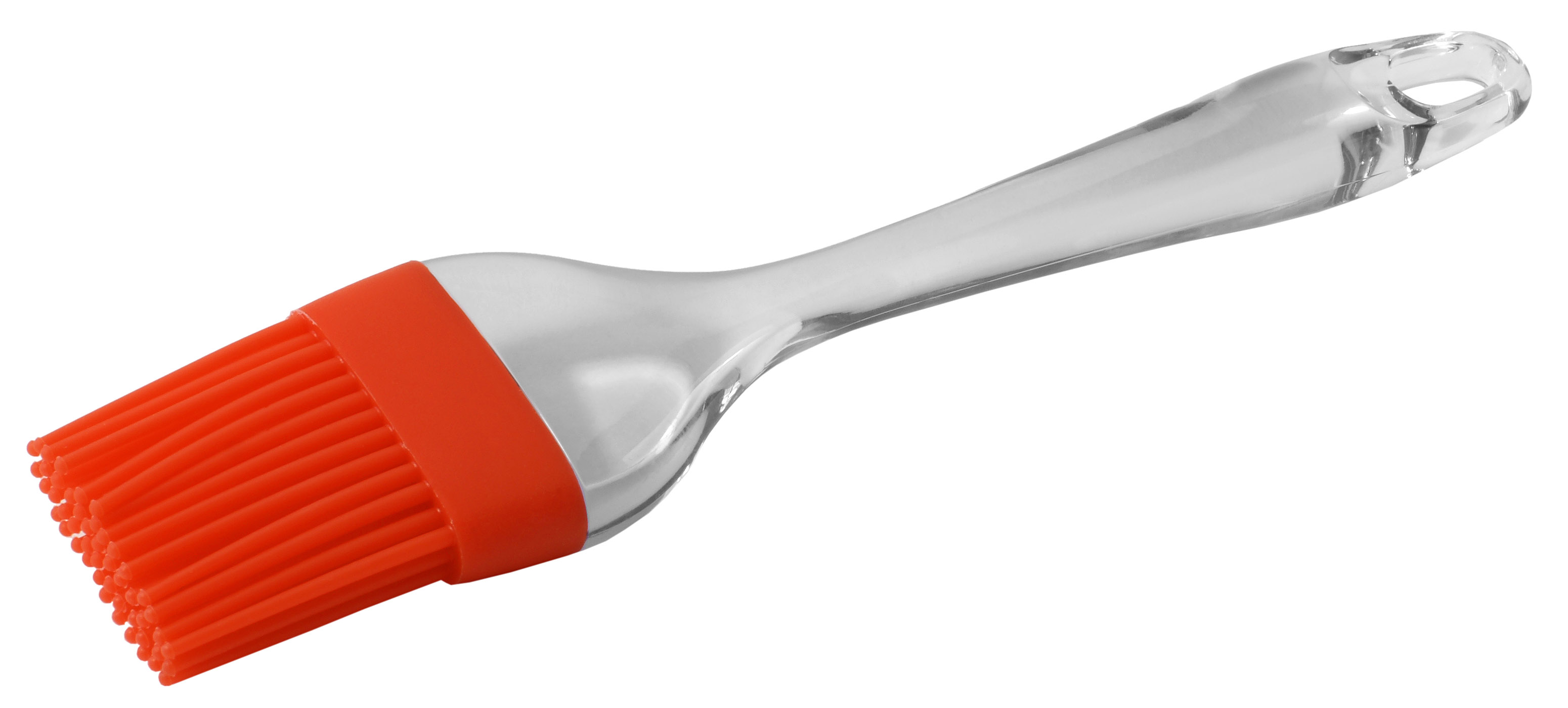
Silicone brush used for basting and applying flavoring liquids

As a low-taint, non-toxic material, silicone can be used where contact with food is required. Silicone is becoming an important product in the cookware industry, particularly bakeware and kitchen utensils.

Silicone is used as an insulator in heat-resistant potholders and similar items; however, it is more conductive of heat than similar less dense fiber-based products. Silicone oven gloves are able to withstand temperatures up to 260 °C (500 °F), making it possible to reach into boiling water.

Other products include molds for chocolate, ice, cookies, muffins, and various other foods; non-stick bakeware and reusable mats used on baking sheets; steamers, egg boilers or poachers; cookware lids, pot holders, trivets, and kitchen mats.

=== Defoaming ===
Silicones are used as active compounds in defoamers due to their low water solubility and good spreading properties.

=== Dry cleaning ===
Liquid silicone can be used as a dry cleaning solvent, providing an alternative to the traditional chlorine-containing perchloroethylene (perc) solvent. The use of silicones in dry cleaning reduces the environmental effect of a typically high-polluting industry.

=== Electronics ===
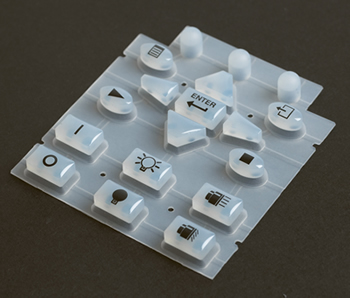
Silicone rubber keypad

Electronic components are sometimes encased in silicone to increase stability against mechanical and electrical shock, radiation and vibration, a process called "potting". Silicones are used where durability and high performance are demanded of components under extreme environmental conditions, such as in space (satellite technology). They are selected over polyurethane or epoxy encapsulation when a wide operating temperature range is required (−65 to 315 °C). Silicones also have the advantage of little exothermic heat rise during cure, low toxicity, good electrical properties, and high purity.

Silicones are often components of thermal pastes used to improve heat transfer from power-dissipating electronic components to heat sinks.

The use of silicones in electronics is not without problems, however. Silicones are relatively expensive and can be attacked by certain solvents. Silicone easily migrates as either a liquid or vapor onto other components. Silicone contamination of electrical switch contacts can lead to failures by causing an increase in contact resistance, often late in the life of the contact, well after any testing is completed. Use of silicone-based spray products in electronic devices during maintenance or repairs can cause later failures.

=== Firestops ===
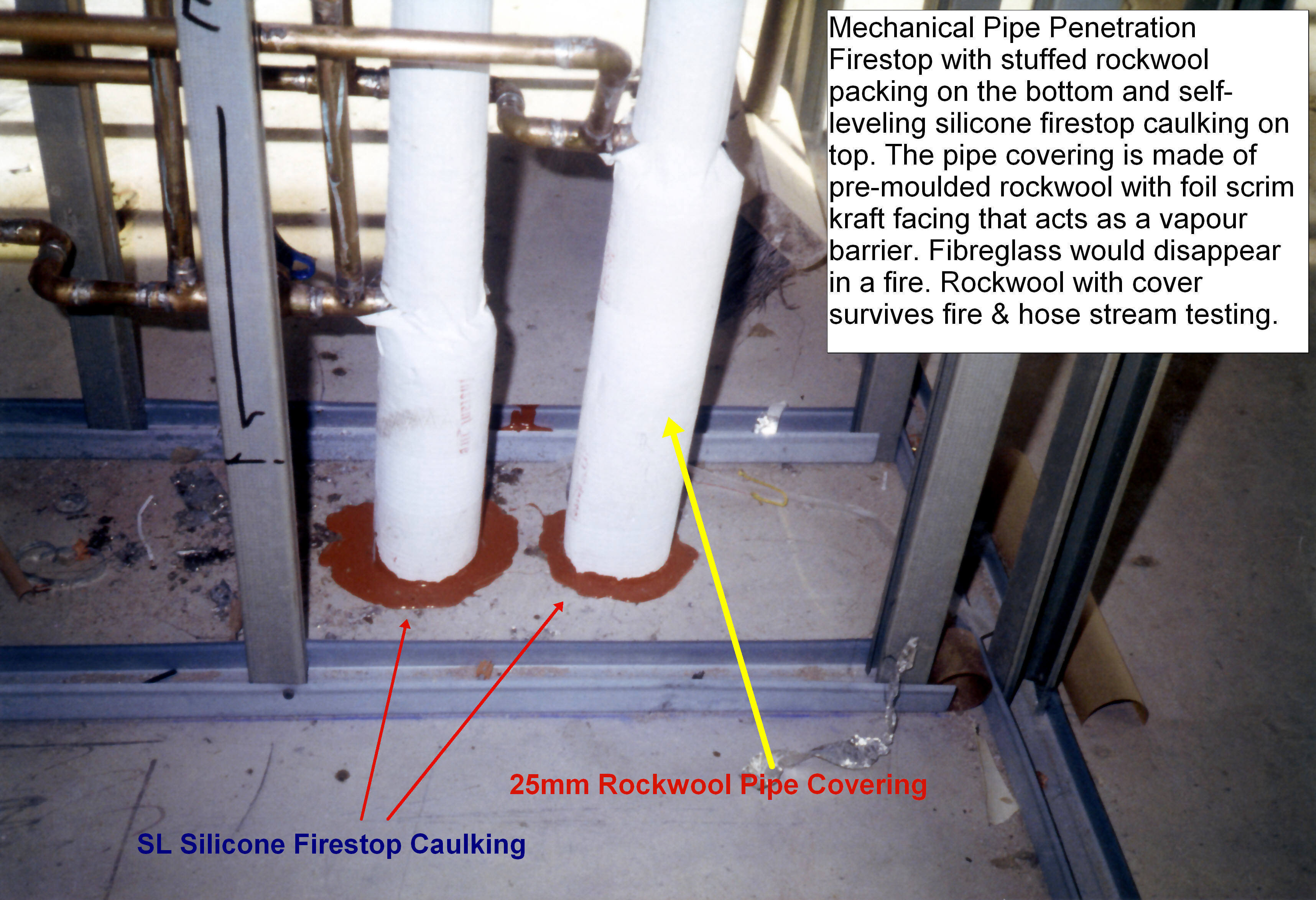
Red-colored silicone firestopping

Silicone foam has been used in North American buildings in an attempt to firestop openings within the fire-resistance-rated wall and floor assemblies to prevent the spread of flames and smoke from one room to another. When properly installed, silicone-foam firestops can be fabricated for building code compliance. Advantages include flexibility and high dielectric strength. Disadvantages include combustibility (hard to extinguish) and significant smoke development.

Silicone-foam firestops have been the subject of controversy and press attention due to smoke development from pyrolysis of combustible components within the foam, hydrogen gas escape, shrinkage, and cracking. These problems have led to reportable events among licensees (operators of nuclear power plants) of the Nuclear Regulatory Commission (NRC). Silicone firestops are also used in aircraft.

=== Jewelry ===
Silicone is a popular alternative to traditional metals (such as silver and gold) with jewelry, specifically rings. Silicone rings are commonly worn in professions where metal rings can lead to injuries, such as electrical conduction and ring avulsions. During the mid-2010s, some professional athletes began wearing silicone rings as an alternative during games.

Most common use of silicone are for watch bands. scratch resistance, soft, flexible and comfort also offer excellent durability make silicone one of the top choice material for watch straps.

=== Lubricants ===
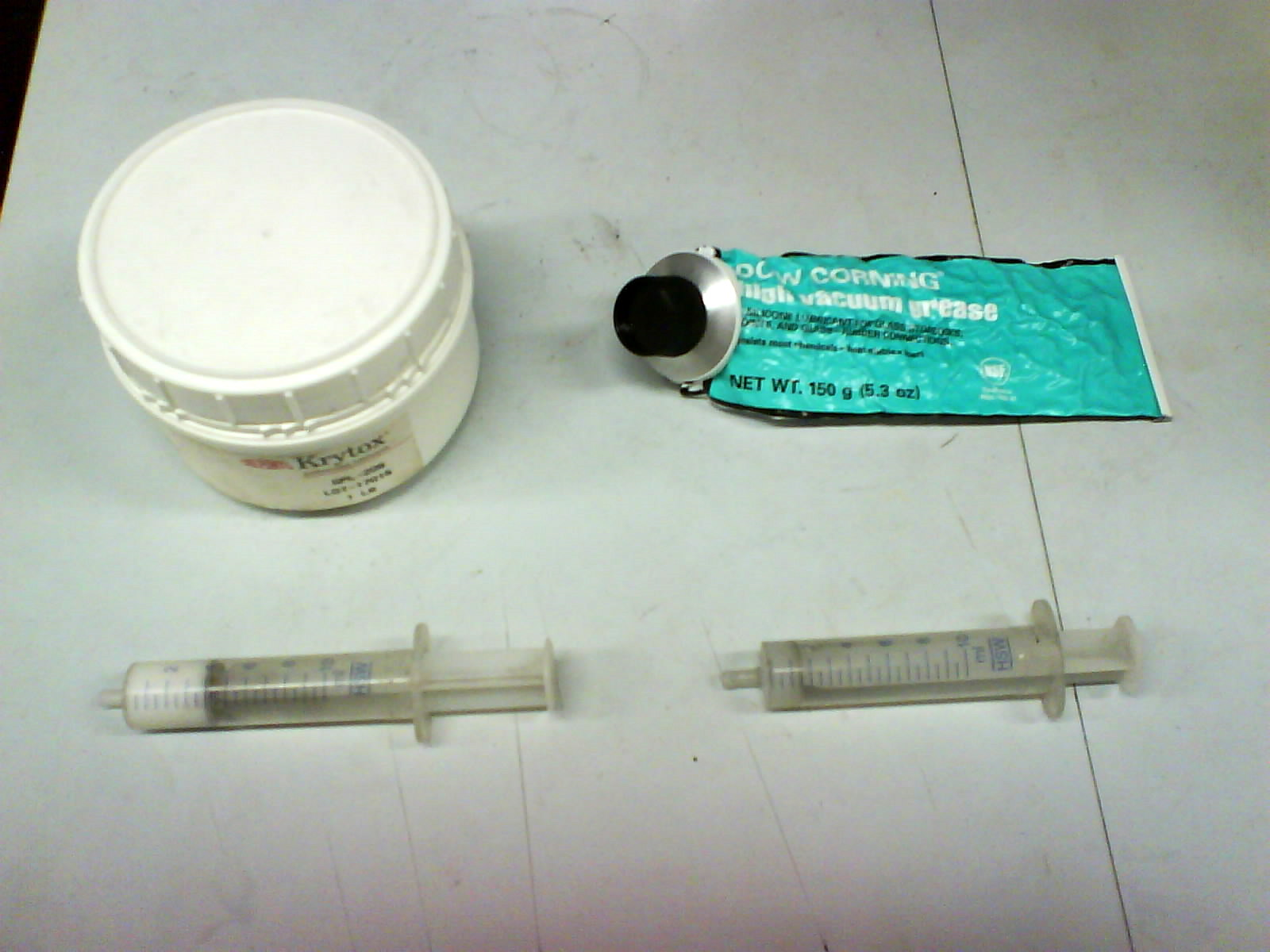
Silicone grease is often used with laboratory glassware to prevent seizing

Silicone greases are used for many purposes, such as bicycle chains, airsoft gun parts, and a wide range of other mechanisms. Typically, a dry-set lubricant is delivered with a solvent carrier to penetrate the mechanism. The solvent then evaporates, leaving a clear film that lubricates but does not attract dirt and grit as much as an oil-based or other traditional "wet" lubricant.

Silicone personal lubricants are also available for use in medical procedures or sexual activity.

=== Medicine and cosmetic surgery ===
Silicone is used in microfluidics, seals, gaskets, shrouds, and other applications requiring high biocompatibility. Additionally, the gel form is used in bandages and dressings, breast implants, testicle implants, pectoral implants, contact lenses, and a variety of other medical uses.

Scar treatment sheets are often made of medical grade silicone due to its durability and biocompatibility. Polydimethylsiloxane (PDMS) is often used for this purpose, since its specific crosslinking results in a flexible and soft silicone with high durability and tack. It has also been used as the hydrophobic block of amphiphilic synthetic block copolymers used to form the vesicle membrane of polymersomes.

Illicit cosmetic silicone injections may induce chronic and definitive silicone blood diffusion with dermatologic complications.

Ophthalmology uses many products such as silicone oil used to replace the vitreous humor following vitrectomy, silicone intraocular lenses following cataract extraction, silicone tubes to keep a nasolacrimal passage open following dacryocystorhinostomy, canalicular stents for canalicular stenosis, punctal plugs for punctal occlusion in dry eyes, silicone rubber and bands as an external tamponade in tractional retinal detachment, and anteriorly-located break in rhegmatogenous retinal detachment.

Addition and condensation silicones (such as polyvinyl siloxane) find wide application as a dental impression material due to its hydrophobic property and thermal stability.

=== Moldmaking ===
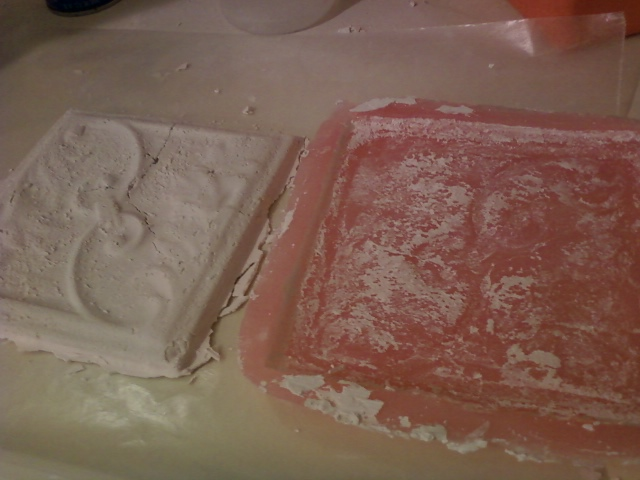
Silicone mold used to reproduce an architectural detail

Two-part silicone systems are used as rubber molds to cast resins, foams, rubber, and low-temperature alloys. A silicone mold generally requires little or no mold-release or surface preparation, as most materials do not adhere to silicone. For experimental uses, ordinary one-part silicone can be used to make molds or to mold into shapes. If needed, common vegetable cooking oils or petroleum jelly can be used on mating surfaces as a mold-release agent.

Silicone cooking molds used as bakeware do not require coating with cooking oil; in addition, the flexibility of the rubber allows the baked food to be easily removed from the mold after cooking.

=== Personal care ===
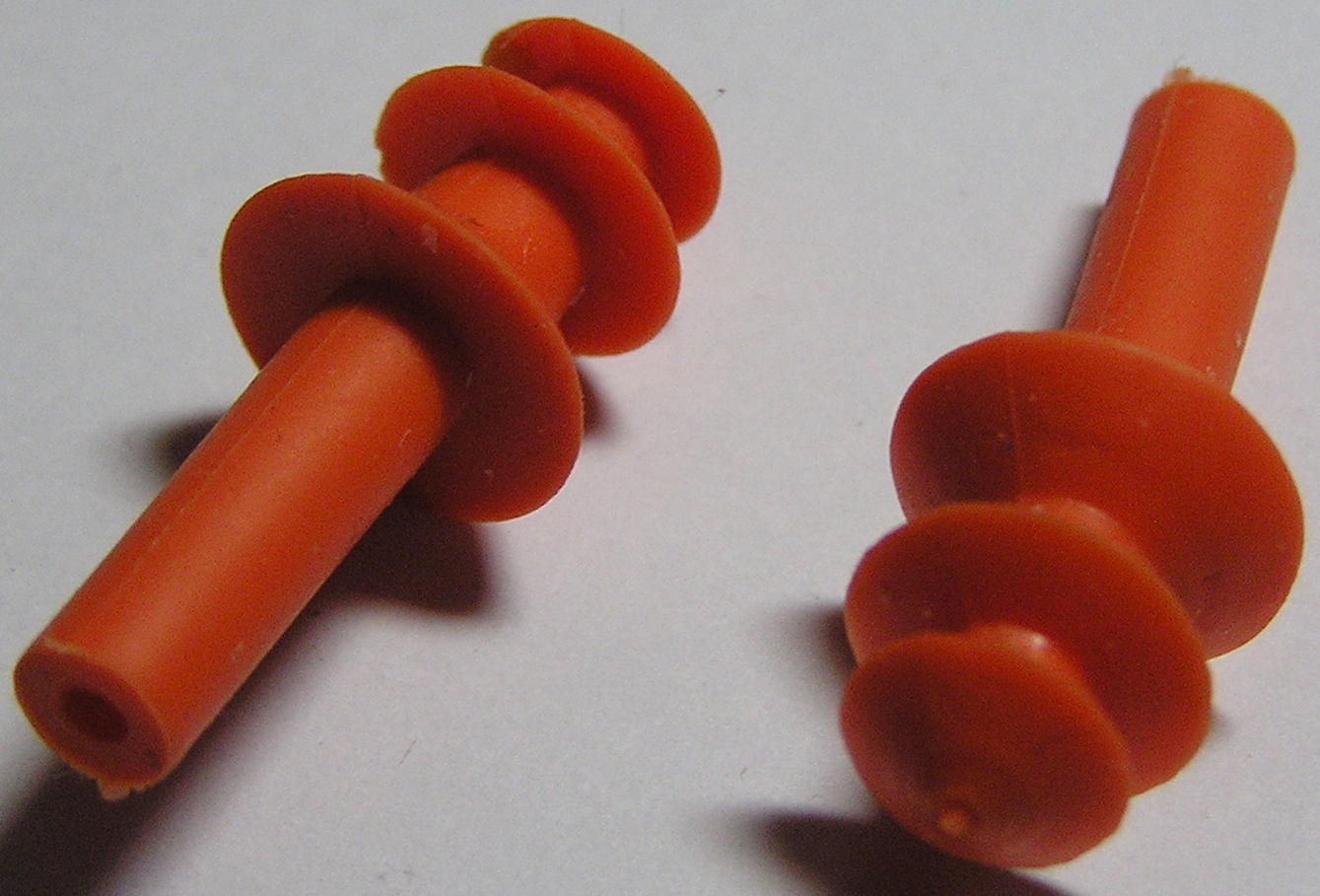
Silicone rubber earplugs for hearing protection

Silicones are ingredients widely used in skincare, color cosmetic and hair care applications. Some silicones, notably the amine-functionalized amodimethicones, are excellent hair conditioners, providing improved compatibility, feel, and softness, and lessening frizz. The phenyldimethicones, in another silicone family, are used in reflection-enhancing and color-correcting hair products, where they increase shine and glossiness (and possibly impart subtle color changes). Phenyltrimethicones, unlike the conditioning amodimethicones, have refractive indices (typically 1.46) close to that of a human hair (1.54). However, if included in the same formulation, amodimethicone and phenyltrimethicone interact and dilute each other, making it difficult to achieve both high shine and excellent conditioning in the same product.

Silicone rubber is commonly used in baby bottle nipples (teats) for its cleanliness, aesthetic appearance, and low extractable content.

Silicones are used in shaving products and personal lubricants.

=== Toys and hobbies ===
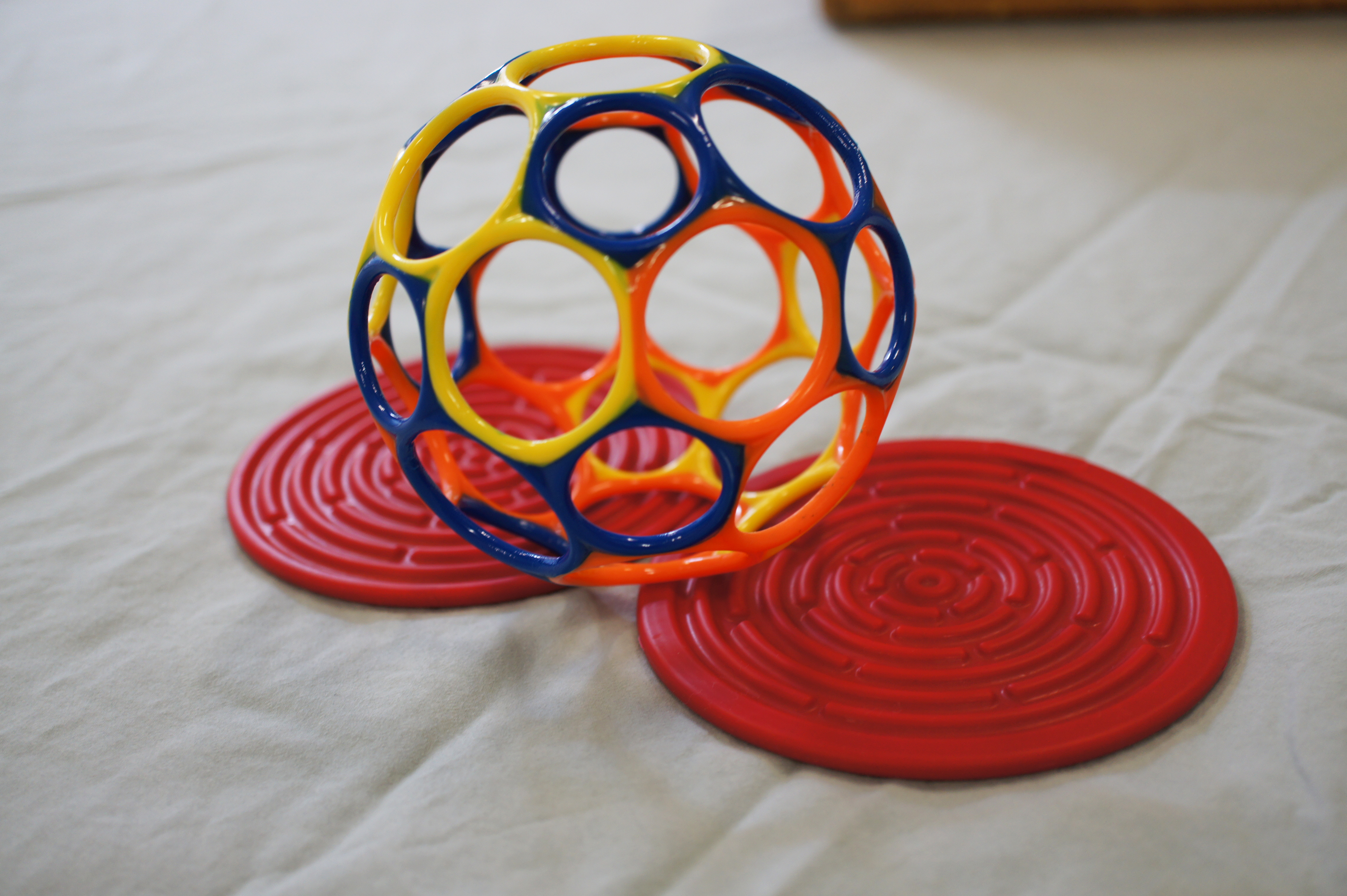
Baby toys made of nontoxic silicone rubber

Silly Putty and similar materials are composed of silicones dimethyl siloxane, polydimethylsiloxane, and decamethyl cyclopentasiloxane, with other ingredients. This substance is noted for its unusual characteristics, e.g., that it bounces, but breaks when given a sharp blow; it will also flow like a liquid and form a puddle given enough time.

Silicone "rubber bands" are a long-lasting popular replacement refill for real rubber bands in the 2013 fad "rubber band loom" toys at two to four times the price (in 2014). Silicone bands also come in bracelet sizes that can be custom embossed with a name or message. Large silicone bands are also sold as utility tie-downs.

Formerol is a silicone rubber (marketed as Sugru) used as an arts-and-crafts material, as its plasticity allows it to be molded by hand like modeling clay. It hardens at room temperature and it is adhesive to various substances including glass and aluminum.

Oogoo is a silicone clay, which can be used as a substitute for Sugru.

In making aquariums, manufacturers now commonly use 100% silicone sealant to join glass plates. Glass joints made with silicone sealant can withstand great pressure, making obsolete the original aquarium construction method of angle-iron and putty. This same silicone is used to make hinges in aquarium lids or for minor repairs. However, not all commercial silicones are safe for aquarium manufacture, nor is silicone used for the manufacture of acrylic aquariums as silicones do not have long-term adhesion to plastics.

=== Special effects ===
Silicone is used in special effects as a material for simulating realistic skin, either for prosthetic makeup, prop body parts, or rubber masks. Platinum silicones are ideal for simulating flesh and skin due to their strength, firmness, and translucency, creating a convincing effect.

Silicone masks have an advantage over latex masks in that because of the material properties, the mask hugs the wearers face and moves in a realistic manner with the wearer's facial expressions. Silicone is often used as a hypoallergenic substitute for foam latex prosthetics.

== Marketing ==
The leading global manufacturers of silicone base materials belong to three regional organizations: the European Silicone Center (CES) in Brussels, Belgium; the Silicones Environmental, Health, and Safety Center (SEHSC) in Herndon, Virginia, US; and the Silicone Industry Association of Japan (SIAJ) in Tokyo, Japan. Dow Corning Silicones, Evonik Industries, Momentive Performance Materials, Milliken and Company (SiVance Specialty Silicones), Shin-Etsu Silicones, Wacker Chemie, Elkem Silicones, JNC Corporation, Wacker Asahikasei Silicone, and Dow Corning Toray represent the collective membership of these organizations. A fourth organization, the Global Silicone Council (GSC) acts as an umbrella structure over the regional organizations. All four are non-profit, having no commercial role; their primary missions are to promote the safety of silicones from a health, safety, and environmental perspective. As the European chemical industry is preparing to implement the Registration, Evaluation, and Authorisation of Chemicals (REACH) legislation, CES is leading the formation of a consortium of silicones, silanes, and siloxanes producers and importers to facilitate data and cost-sharing.

== Safety and environmental considerations ==
Silicone compounds are pervasive in the environment. Particular silicone compounds, cyclic siloxanes D_{4} and D_{5}, are air and water pollutants and have negative health effects on test animals. They are used in various personal care products. The European Chemicals Agency found that "D_{4} is a persistent, bioaccumulative and toxic (PBT) substance and D_{5} is a very persistent, very bioaccumulative (vPvB) substance". Other silicones biodegrade readily, a process that is accelerated by a variety of catalysts, including clays. Cyclic silicones have been shown to involve the occurrence of silanols during biodegradation in mammals. The resulting silanediols and silanetriols are capable of inhibiting hydrolytic enzymes such as thermolysin, acetylcholinesterase. However, the doses required for inhibition are by orders of magnitude higher than the ones resulting from the accumulated exposure to consumer products containing cyclomethicone.

At around 200 °C (392 °F) in an oxygen-containing atmosphere, polydimethylsiloxane releases traces of formaldehyde (but lesser amounts than other common materials such as polyethylene). At this temperature, silicones were found to have lower formaldehyde generation than mineral oil and plastics (less than 3 to 48 μg CH_{2}O/(g·hr) for a high consistency silicone rubber, versus around 400 μg CH_{2}O/(g·hr) for plastics and mineral oil). By 250 °C (482 °F), copious amounts of formaldehyde have been found to be produced by all silicones (1,200 to 4,600 μg CH_{2}O/(g·hr)).

Some persons have been found to develop silicone allergies or extreme sensitivity, particularly after prolonged exposure to certain types of silicone products such as cosmetics, medical equipment including CPAP masks and implanted medical devices.

Although silicones are durable polymers, they have historically been difficult to recycle. Recent research from CNRS and the University Claude Bernard Lyon 1 has reported chemical depolymerization routes that convert crosslinked silicone materials back into reusable oils or monomers with reduced environmental impacts. In industrial practice, Elkem has reported pilot and commercial initiatives for circular silicones, including recycled‑content products for the label industry and broader solutions such as mechanical re‑incorporation of elastomers and the use of bio‑based carriers and solvents.

== See also ==
- Injection molding of liquid silicone rubber – Process to produce pliable, durable parts in high volume
- Silanones exotic class of compounds with silicon–oxygen double bonds
