= Silicone foam =

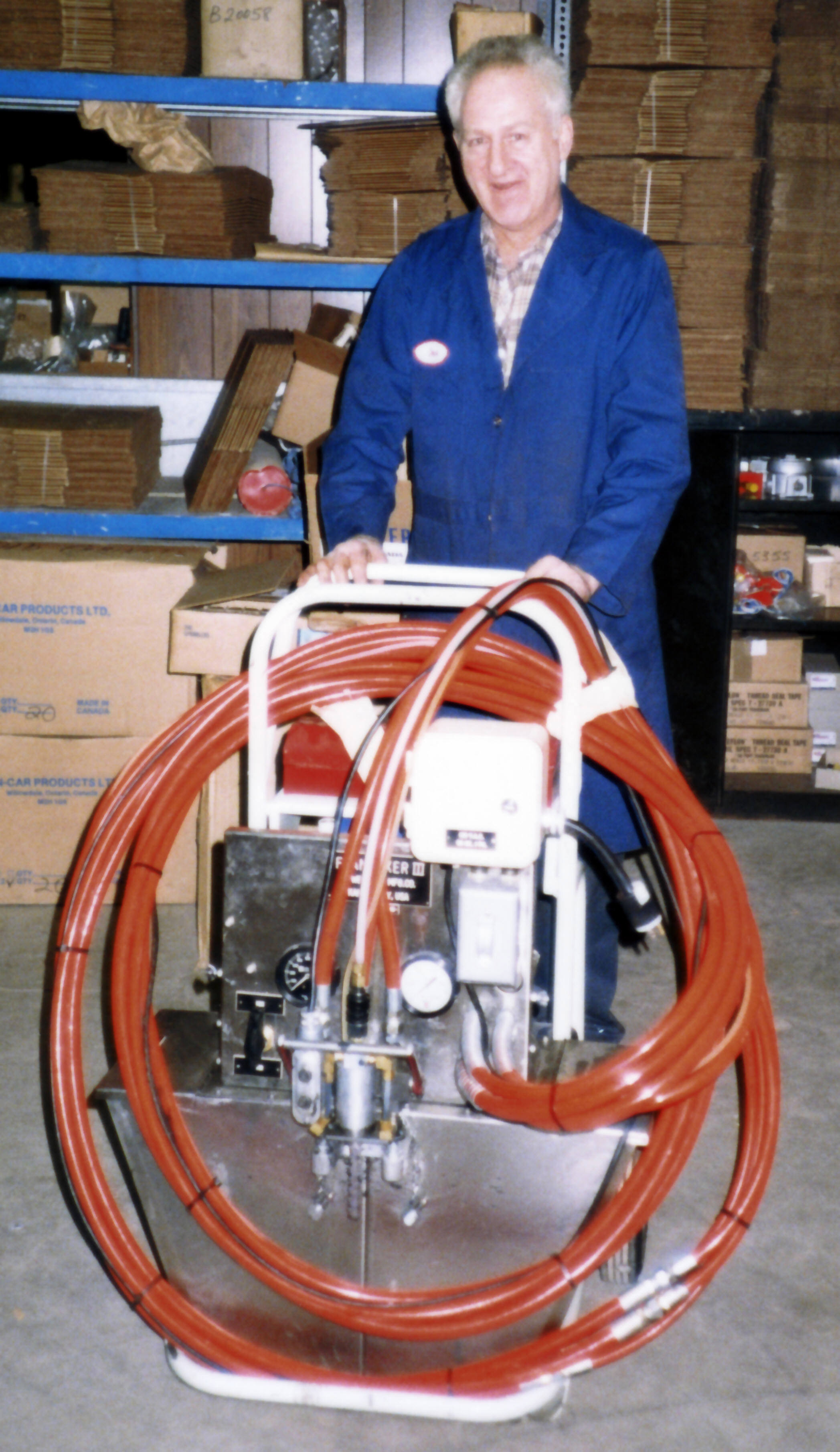
Foam fixer pump used to draw silicone foam individual components, then mix them at the nozzle and dispense into desired location.

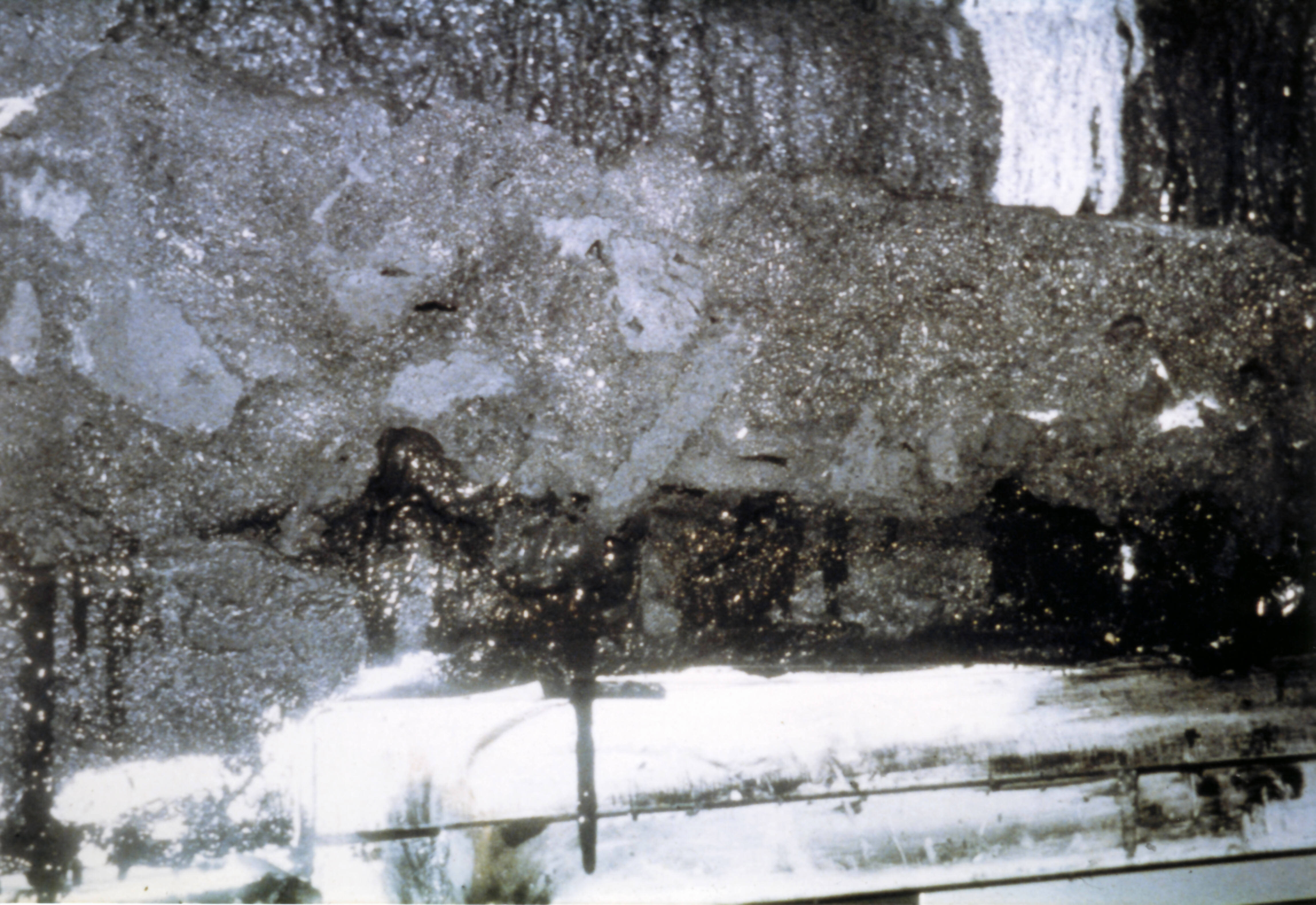
Silicone foam having been dispensed into hole in a wall, above a door.

Silicone foam is a synthetic rubber product used in gasketing, sheets and firestops. It is available in solid, cured form as well as in individual liquid components for field installations.

== Uses ==
- Gaskets
- Sheets
- High temperature tubes for autoclaves
- Firestops
- Surfactants

== Vulcanisation ==
When the constituent components of silicone foam are mixed together, they evolve hydrogen gas, which causes bubbles to form within the rubber, as it changes from liquid to solid. This results in an outward pressure. Temperature and humidity can influence the rate of expansion.

== See also ==
- Firestop
- Vulcanisation
- Rubber
- Silicone resin
