= Tesa SE =

German company

tesa SE

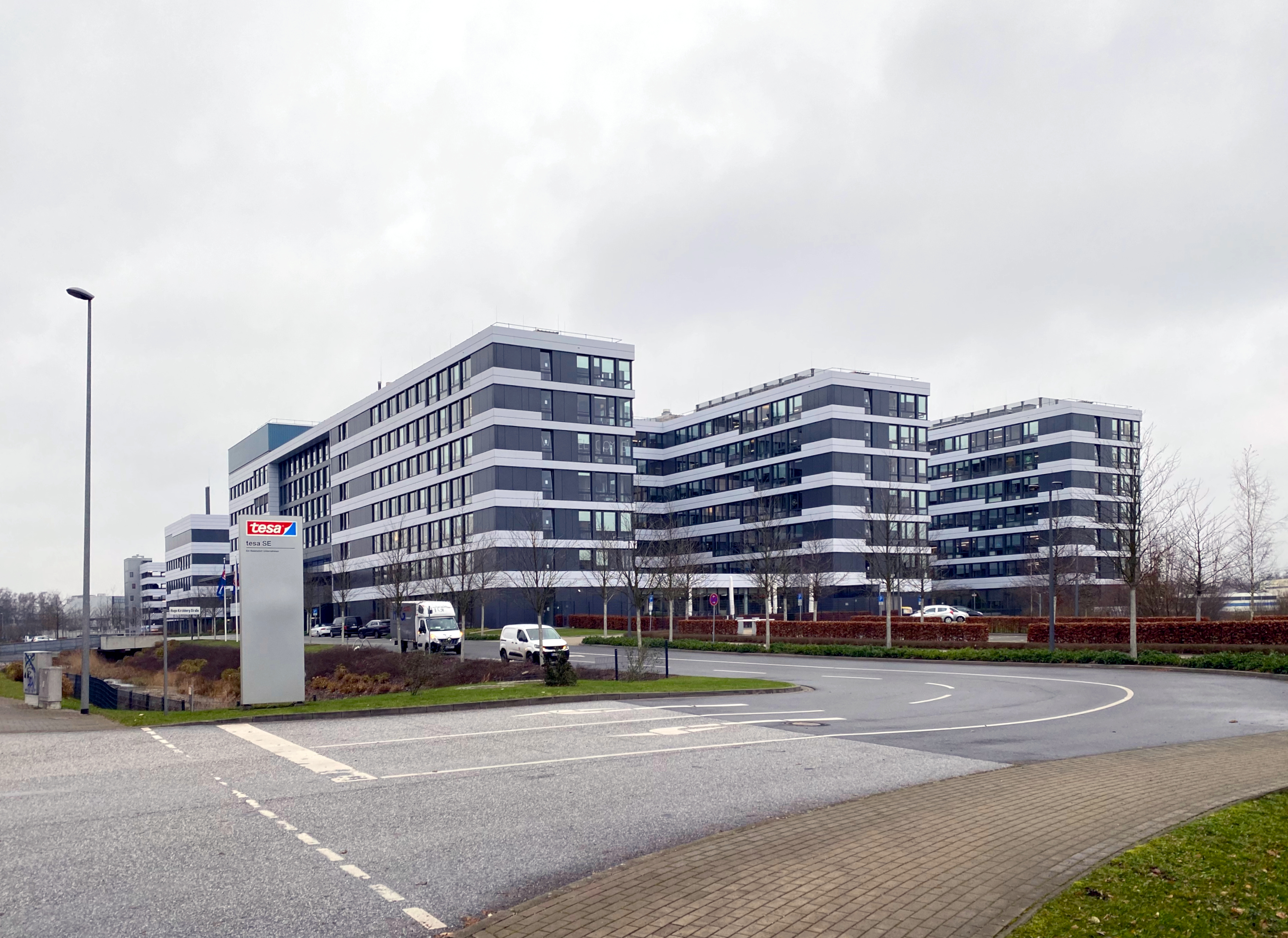
- tesa headquarters in Norderstedt
- Type: Societas Europaea
- Industry: Chemical industry
- Founded: 2001; 25 years ago
- Headquarters: Norderstedt, Germany
- Area served: Worldwide
- Key people: Kourosh Bahrami (CEO); Jörg Diesfeld (CFO)
- Products: Adhesives
- Revenue: €1,498,800,000 (2021)
- Number of employees: 4827 (2021)
- Parent: Beiersdorf AG
- Website: www.tesa.com

Tesa SE is a German company manufacturing adhesive products. Founded in 2001, the company was previously a division of Beiersdorf, remaining a subsidiary thereof after becoming an independent company. In Germany, the brand name has become synonymous with adhesive tape, and is listed in the Duden dictionary as such.

In addition to its consumer adhesive tapes, glue sticks, sticky notes and other products such as Sugru, the company also supplies adhesives to other industries. Clients include Apple and Samsung, for whom Tesa supplies adhesives to build smartphones and tablet computers, as well as the car industry, where the company provides adhesives for a wide range of applications like windows, sensors, and displays.

== History ==
The name Tesa was coined in 1906 by Elsa Tesmer, who worked as a clerk and later head of the typing pool at Beiersdorf until her marriage in 1908. She formed the term "Tesa" from the first two letters of her surname and the last two letters of her first name in a brand name competition.

The company initially manufactured toothpaste tubes, and the newly chosen name was therefore used for the patented tube of the toothpaste "Pebeco" developed by Beiersdorf. The tube business was not very successful, and for this reason, in 1926 the brand name was assigned to a newly developed product. The company gave its name to a novel dipping compound for coating sausages, but this product also remained largely unsuccessful.

In 1935, Beiersdorf AG developed a transparent adhesive film, which was initially marketed under the name Beiersdorf Rubber Adhesive Film and sold only modestly well. Beiersdorf employee Hugo Kirchberg therefore came up with the idea of naming the product "TESA." Kirchberg first referred to "tesa adhesive film" in a letter in 1936.

The introduction of Tesa as the umbrella name for all adhesive tapes produced by Beiersdorf significantly increased the brand's importance in the company from 1941 onwards. Today, there are approximately 7,000 different Tesa products. In 2001, Tesa SE was spun off from Beiersdorf AG as an independent company (then as the public limited company Tesa AG). Annual sales in 2014 came to over a billion euros.

The main plant in Hamburg primarily manufactures products for the automotive and electrical industries. Tesa tape and other consumer products are produced at the Tesa plant in Offenburg.

In Austria, the company took over the TIXO brand from the former manufacturer Kores, a brand name that enjoys just as much recognition in Austria as Tesa does in Germany.

Since March 30, 2009, the company has operated as Tesa SE, meaning a European company. In 2011, with the approval of patches that can deliver medicinal substances to the body through the skin, the company entered the pharmaceutical market.

In October 2015, Tesa relocated its headquarters from Hamburg to Norderstedt-Garstedt, to the Nettelkrögen industrial park.

== Data storage ==
In March 1998, shortly before a CeBIT presentation at the University of Mannheim, physicists Steffen Noehte and Matthias Gerspach, then a graduate student, discovered by chance that ordinary adhesive tape was particularly well-suited for laser-etching structures and thus also for use as a data storage medium. The research duo received initial funding from Klaus Tschira, a former member of the SAP Executive Board, at his European Media Laboratory (EML). Tesa SE took up this basic research and initially entered into a development collaboration with the researchers. In December 2001, they jointly founded Tesa Scribos GmbH in Heidelberg, with the researchers holding a 25% stake and Tesa SE a 75% stake. However, in 2007, Tesa SE acquired the shares of the remaining shareholders and became the sole shareholder. Within the newly formed company, the team was able to further develop the invention in their own laboratory. Initially, however, the focus was on a system for product tracking and for the protection against counterfeiting of branded products. The so-called Tesa Holospot system has been on the market since 2003. So far, Tesa tape has not been used as a mass data storage device.

=== Anti-counterfeiting measures using miniature holograms ===
The core of Tesa's Holospot technology is a small label made of a special polymer material, featuring a 1 mm^{2} data field. This field can store information such as images, logos, or text up to 1 kB. The information can be stored on the Holospot in the form of microtext or computer-generated digital holograms, and can also be encrypted if desired, ensuring tamper-proof storage. Depending on the required security level, the information can be read with a magnifying glass or with analog or digital readers. This enables the individual marking of each product and thus its authentication or traceability.

This business unit, known as tesa scribos, was acquired by Leonhard Kurz on September 1, 2021.
