= Sugru =

Brand of silicone rubber repair putty

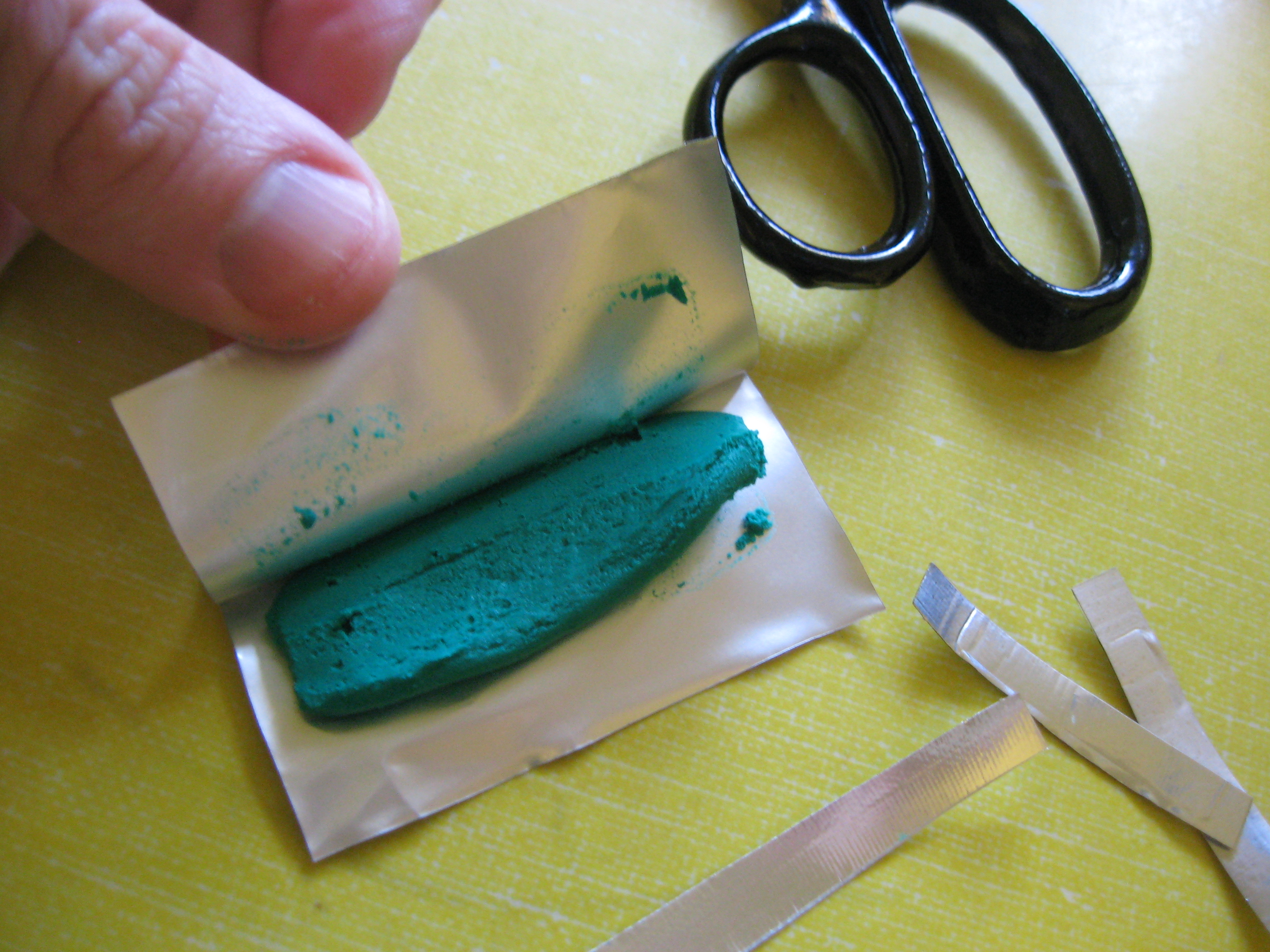
- A packet of uncured Sugru
- Type: Adhesive repair putty
- Inventor: Jane Ní Dhulchaointigh
- Inception: 2003
- Manufacturer: FormFormForm Ltd; Now Tesa SE
- Website: sugru.com

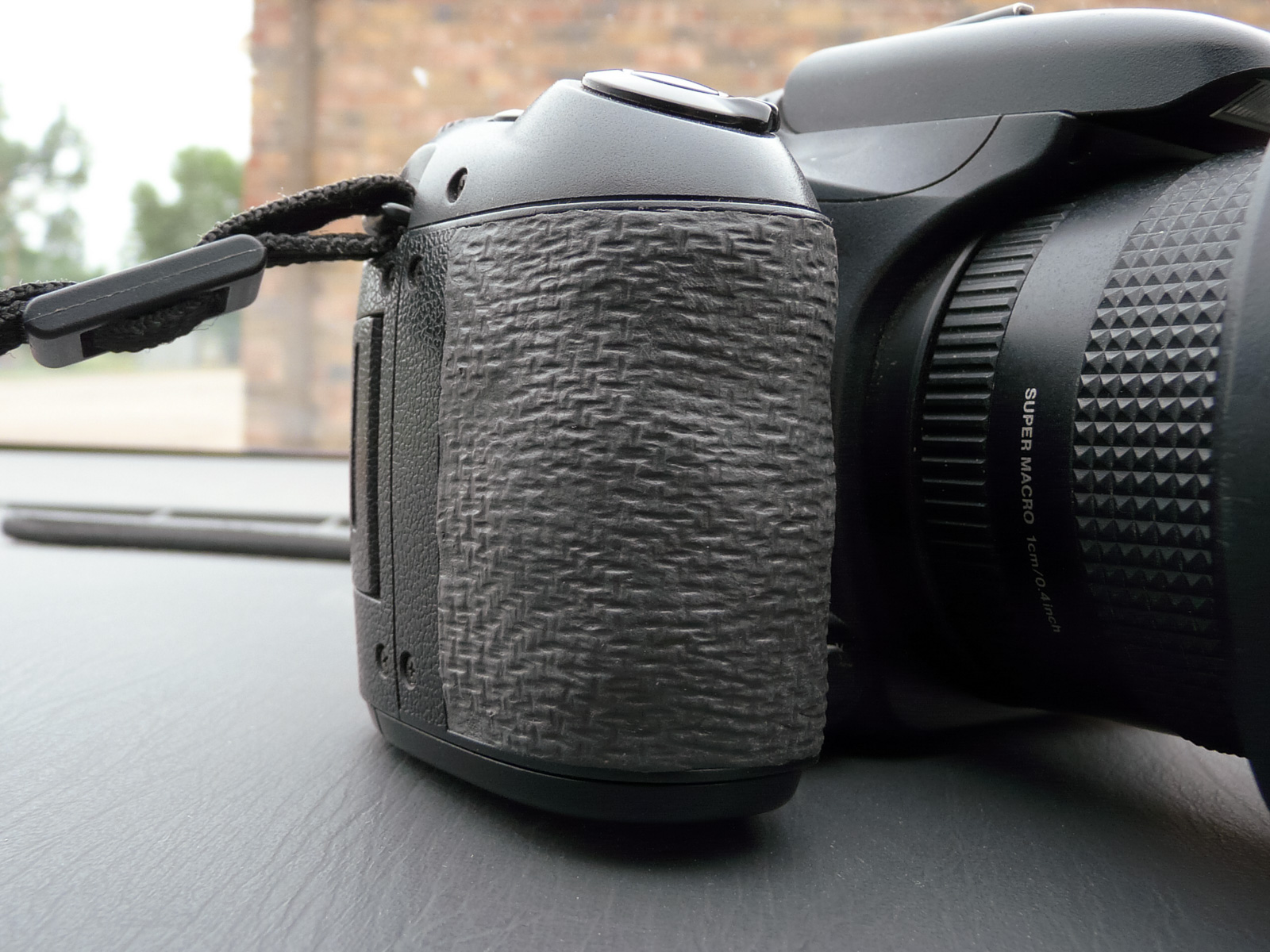
Sugru used to repair a damaged camera grip, with texture achieved by impressing fibreglass mesh before curing was complete

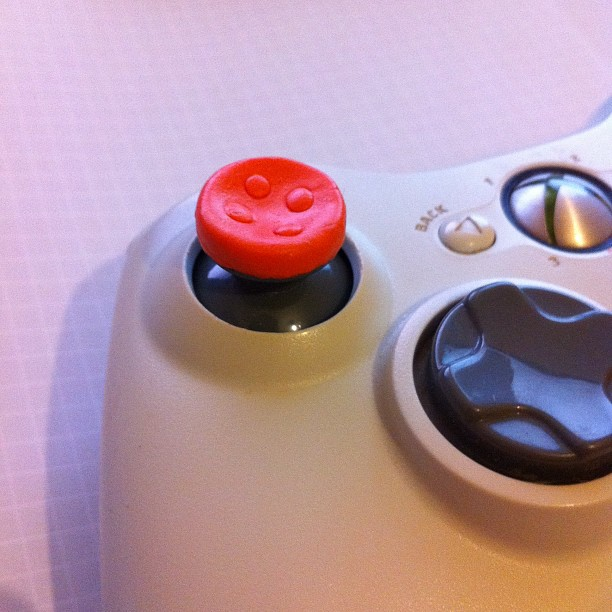
The joystick of a game controller that has been fixed with Sugru

Sugru (/ˈsuːɡruː/), also known as Formerol, is a patented multi-purpose, non-slumping brand of adhesive silicone rubber that resembles modelling clay. It is available in several colours and upon exposure to air, cures to a rubber-like texture.

== Properties ==
Sugru is malleable when removed from its airtight, moisture-proof packaging, retains its plasticity for thirty minutes, and is self-curing at room temperature in approximately 24 hours. The material adheres to aluminium, steel, copper, ceramics, glass, fabric, brass, leather, plywood, and other materials, including ABS plastics.

When cured, Sugru has a 'soft touch' or slightly flexible, grippable texture similar to features commonly found in soft overmolds. It is waterproof and dishwasher-safe, and the material is thermally insulating, with a service temperature range between −50 and 180 °C (between −58 and 356 °F or 223 and 453 K). Sugru is not resistant to isopropyl alcohol. While early versions of the product had a short shelf-life, as of 2014, it was being advertised as staying fresh for 13 months from the date it was made. According to the company, if kept in a refrigerator, the remaining shelf-life is tripled.

Sugru has not been tested for food safety, and the manufacturers advise against using it in contact with food or drink.

== History ==
The idea for Sugru was developed by Jane Ní Dhulchaointigh from Kilkenny, Ireland. Ní Dhulchaointigh studied product design as a post-graduate research student at the Royal College of Art, where she conceived the idea for the substance in 2003 while using mixtures of standard silicone sealants and sawdust in her work.

After receiving business grants, Ní Dhulchaointigh worked with retired scientists from Dow Corning and a silicone expert over a seven-year period at the materials department at Queen Mary, University of London to develop a silicone elastomer that was mouldable, self-adhesive and self-curing. Her goal was to enable people "to easily and affordably repair, improve or customise things they already own".

Sugru was developed by and is marketed by FormFormForm, a company in Hackney, London, with over 100,000 customers as of 2012, annual sales of US$2 million, and a staff of 30.

In May 2015, the company launched a campaign to raise £1 million (US$1,280,000) on the crowdfunding site CrowdCube. The company reached its £1 million funding target in just four days and continued on to raise well over £3 million.

In December 2016, the company secured a further £4m investment from Clydesdale and Yorkshire Banks.

The name Sugru derives from the Irish language word "súgradh" for "play".

In May 2018, FormFormForm was acquired by German adhesive company Tesa SE, a subsidiary of Beiersdorf.

== Chemical compound ==
The formulation of Sugru contains 25-50% silicone (polysiloxane), 25–50% talc, and the remaining additives including methyltris (methylethylketoxime) silane and (3-aminopropyl)triethoxysilane. The company claims its formulation can be varied to offer different levels of consistency, plasticity, softness, resiliency, surface adhesion, modulus and abrasion resistance, setting time, density, and ability to float.

According to the company's MSDS for the U.S., Sugru is classified as "not hazardous" under OSHA's 2012 Hazard Communication Standard, and for Europe, Sugru "does not meet the criteria for classification in any hazard class" under EU Regulation No. 1272/2008 and Directive 1999/45/EC. However, both versions of the MSDS note that Sugru may cause irritation or skin sensitization.

== See also ==
- Polymer clay
- Adhesive putty
- Silly Putty
- Polycaprolactone
- Polyvinyl siloxane
