= Knorre =

Knorre is a German surname derived from the word knorre meaning "knot", "cartilage knot" used as a nickname for a short, fat person. Notable people with the surname include:

- Dmitrii Knorre (1926–2018), Russian chemist and biochemist
- Ernst Friedrich Knorre (1759–1810), German-born astronomer and professor of mathematics who lived and worked in present-day Estonia
- Karl Friedrich Knorre (1801–1883), son of Ernst Friedrich, Russian astronomer of German ethnic origin
- Richard Knorre, various people
- Viktor Knorre (1840–1919), son of Karl Friedrich, Russian astronomer of German ethnic origin

== See also ==
- Knörr
- Knorr
