= Unilever Pakistan =

Pakistani subsidiary of the British multinational company

- Native name: یونی لیور پاکستان
- Type: Subsidiary
- Traded as: PSX: UPFL
- Industry: Fast-moving consumer goods
- Founded: 1948; 78 years ago in Rahim Yar Khan, Pakistan
- Headquarters: Karachi, Pakistan
- Key people: Amir R. Paracha (CEO)
- Products: Foods; Beauty & Personal Products; Soap; Home Care
- Brands: Knorr; Pond's; Sunsilk; Dove; Lux; Surf Excel
- Revenue: ▲ Rs. 3371 crore (US$120 million) (2024)
- Net income: ▲ Rs. 1017 crore (US$36 million) (2024)
- Total assets: ▲ Rs. 2798 crore (US$100 million) (2024)
- Total equity: ▲ Rs. 1338 crore (US$48 million) (2024)
- Parent: Unilever
- Subsidiaries: Unilever Pakistan Foods Limited; Unilever Pakistan Limited
- Website: unilever.pk

Unilever Pakistan, formerly known as Lever Brothers Pakistan, is the Pakistani subsidiary of British multinational consumer packaged goods company Unilever. It operates under two separate companies, Unilever Pakistan Foods Limited (UPFL), a publicly listed company for its food business, while Unilever Pakistan Limited (UPL), a privately-owned subsidiary which looks after beauty, well-being, personal care, and home care businesses.

== History ==
=== Background ===
Lever Brothers began selling Sunlight soap in British India in 1888. It set up the Hindustan Vanaspati Manufacturing Company in 1931 and incorporated Lever Brothers (India) Limited, a forerunner of Hindustan Unilever, in 1933. The vanaspati company began selling Dalda, a brand of hydrogenated vegetable cooking fat (vanaspati), in 1937. The name was formed by inserting the L of Lever into Dada, a vanaspati brand belonging to the merchant Kassim Dada. During the Second World War, the Wazir Ali family, whose business had started in 1875 as a supplier to the British Army, bought Lever products in large quantities for the army.

At the partition of India in 1947, Lever's factories lay in India, and it supplied Pakistan from them while it built a factory there. Before partition, Lever had agreed to join a cottonseed-crushing and vanaspati venture in Bahawalpur State with the Wazir Ali family, led by Sir Syed Maratib Ali and his eldest son, Syed Amjad Ali, of the trading firm Syed A. & M. Wazir Ali, and with Sir William Roberts, a long-time cotton grower in the Punjab. The same partners also planned a textile mill, and the oil company was founded to crush the cottonseed left over from the mill's cotton. The joint venture became possible due to efforts of Roberts, who knew Lever Brothers in Bombay, brought the company in, and Lever's manager settled the terms with the state's prime minister, Sir Richard Crofton. Under those terms, Lever was to manage the oil and soap plants and provide half of their capital, with the state, Roberts and the Ali family providing the other half. The partners first meant to crush cottonseed at Rahim Yar Khan and to make vanaspati at Bahawalpur, about 100 miles closer to the main markets, but both plants were built on a site of about 100 acres opposite Rahim Yar Khan railway station.

=== Sadiq Vegetable Oils (1948–1958) ===
Sadiq Vegetable Oils and Allied Industries Limited was registered at Bahawalpur on February 10, 1948, with its office at Rahim Yar Khan. A second public company, Sadiq Soap Company Limited, was set up to make soap at Rahim Yar Khan. The companies took their name from the ruler of Bahawalpur, Sadiq Muhammad Khan Abbasi V. The oil company's first shareholders included the Bahawalpur government, Unilever (Commonwealth Holdings), Roberts and six members of the Ali family, among them Maratib Ali, Amjad Ali, Syed Wajid Ali and Syed Babar Ali. At the start, Unilever held about 45 percent of the oil company and 70 percent of the soap company. The state held about 37 and 20 percent, and Amjad Ali and Roberts held the rest. Mushtaq Ahmad Gurmani, the state's prime minister in 1947–48, chaired the boards of both companies.

Unilever announced plans for an oil mill crushing about 20,000 tons of cottonseed a year, a vanaspati plant whose initial capacity of 3,000 tons a year could be raised to 10,000 tons, and a soap factory producing about 5,000 tons a year. Steel and machinery were slow to arrive, and the equipment, mostly imported from the United Kingdom, was installed by 1952. Prime Minister Khawaja Nazimuddin inaugurated the £1.5 million factory on January 13, 1952. Built with Unilever capital and technicians, it was designed to turn cottonseed into edible oils, cattle feed, soap and glycerine. Dalda vanaspati went into production in 1952 and soap in 1953. Lever moved its Pakistani headquarters to Rahim Yar Khan in 1952.

In June 1955, Sadiq Soap was merged into Sadiq Vegetable Oils, which that year also took over the trading operations of two other Unilever subsidiaries, Lever Brothers Limited and the H.V.M. Company. After Bahawalpur was merged into West Pakistan under the One Unit scheme, the state's investment passed to the West Pakistan government. On July 2, 1958, the company was renamed Lever Brothers Pakistan Limited. By 1960, Unilever held almost all of the 'B' class ordinary shares, the larger class, while the West Pakistan government, the Ali family and the Roberts family were among the holders of the 'A' class.

=== Lever Brothers Pakistan (1958–2002) ===
By 1960, the Rahim Yar Khan factory made vanaspati, toilet and household soaps, toiletries, animal feed and glycerine. In 1964, the company opened a soap factory at Kalurghat, near Chittagong in East Pakistan. In 1966, it moved its registered office from Rahim Yar Khan to Karachi and bought a vanaspati and edible oil factory in Karachi from A & B Food Industries. Unilever's stake was 70 percent in 1966. By 1967, it had factories at Rahim Yar Khan, Karachi and Chittagong and sales offices in Dacca, Lahore, Karachi and Rawalpindi. After Bangladesh became independent in 1971, the Kalurghat factory became the head office and plant of Lever Brothers Bangladesh, which was incorporated on July 5, 1973, and later renamed Unilever Bangladesh.

When the government nationalised the vegetable ghee industry on September 2, 1973, it took over 23 units but exempted those with foreign participation, including Lever Brothers' plants at Karachi and Rahim Yar Khan. Wazir Ali Industries, a vegetable oil and soap company that the Ali family had founded in 1953, was nationalised.

In December 1980, Lever Brothers Pakistan was listed on the Karachi Stock Exchange. Syed Babar Ali sat on its board for more than fifty years and was its chairman in the late 1990s. In 1988, the company started a tea-growing project, with research at a 9-acre station at Shinkiari near Mansehra from 1989. In 2001, it installed a black tea processing unit there. In 1991, it set up a subsidiary, Lever Chemicals.

=== Mergers and acquisitions ===
==== Lipton and Brooke Bond ====
Lipton Pakistan, incorporated in 1948, blended, packed and distributed tea as part of Unilever and was the largest tea company in Pakistan. Lever Brothers Pakistan acquired it in 1989. Brooke Bond Pakistan was founded on June 26, 1948, as a private tea company and was one of the first in the country to pack tea and market it directly. In the early 1970s, the British company Brooke Bond Liebig owned 50.7 percent of it. Its Supreme brand ranked second behind Lipton before Unilever's purchase of the company in the 1990s. Lever Brothers Pakistan completed a merger with Brooke Bond Pakistan, its main competitor, in 1997. In 1999, it offered voluntary severance to all 318 employees of Brooke Bond's Karachi unit.

==== Polka and Wall's ====
Polka, a Pakistani ice cream brand, was launched in the late 1970s. Lever Brothers Pakistan tried to buy it in 1993–94 for Rs 600 million, but Polka's owners asked for Rs 1 billion. Lever then built its own plant and launched Wall's ice cream in Pakistan. In 1996, Unilever bought the three companies of the Polka group, Ambrosia International, Mehran International and Pakistan Industrial Promoters. Shareholders approved a merger of Pakistan Industrial Promoters into Lever Brothers Pakistan in 1998, and the amalgamation was completed in May 1999.

==== Rafhan Bestfoods ====
Unilever Pakistan Foods Limited, a separately listed sister company, began as Rafhan Bestfoods Limited. Incorporated in 1997, it was an affiliate of the American food company Bestfoods. Rafhan was originally founded by three brothers before it formed a joint venture with Bestfoods. By 2001, Rafhan Bestfoods belonged to the Bestfoods group, while the older maize refiner Rafhan Maize Products, which had started operating at Lyallpur in 1953, belonged to Corn Products International. Unilever took over Bestfoods in 2000, and Rafhan Bestfoods was renamed Unilever Pakistan Foods on April 24, 2007. Its brands include Knorr, Rafhan, and it is listed on the Pakistan Stock Exchange.

=== Unilever Pakistan (2002–present) ===
The company adopted the name Unilever Pakistan Limited in 2002. In 2003, Unilever decided to sell the Dalda business in India and Pakistan. The business, which covered Dalda cooking oil and ghee, was sold for Rs 1.33 billion to a group led by Westbury Group that included Dalda's managers as shareholders, and the sale completed in July 2004. The new owner, Dalda Foods, continued to make Blue Band margarine for Unilever under contract, and in 2007 it bought a controlling stake in Wazir Ali Industries.

In June 2007, Unilever bought all the shares held by the government of Punjab, originally held by Bhawalpur State. On November 27, 2012, Unilever Pakistan announced that its parent would buy the roughly 25 percent of shares it did not own, at Rs 9,700 each, and delist the company from the Karachi, Lahore and Islamabad stock exchanges. Following objections from institutional minority shareholders, including Singapore-based Arisaig Partners and Acacia Partners LP, the Karachi Stock Exchange's internal delisting committee recommended a price of Rs 15,000 per share. Unilever accepted in April 2013 at a cost of about Rs 50 billion (US$503 million). Its holding rose to 97.4 percent by the end of 2013, and the company was delisted on September 13, 2013.

Ehsan A. Malik was chairman and chief executive in 2014. Shazia Syed became chief executive in November 2015. Amir R. Paracha replaced her as chief executive of Unilever Pakistan Foods in February 2020 and also heads Unilever Pakistan. In 2018, the company announced a US$120 million investment, mostly in its four factories.

On July 1, 2021, Unilever began moving its Khanewal tea factory to Ekaterra. In November 2021, it agreed to sell Ekaterra to CVC Capital Partners, excluding its tea businesses in India, Nepal, and Indonesia. In 2025, after Unilever separated its ice cream division as The Magnum Ice Cream Company, the Pakistani ice cream business was transferred to a new company, Magnum Ice Cream Company Pakistan Limited.

In 2024, the Competition Commission of Pakistan fined Unilever Pakistan Rs 60 million over deceptive claims in television advertisements for Lifebuoy products. In December 2024, it fined the company a further Rs 75 million for marketing frozen desserts as ice cream and Rs 20 million for false comparisons with dairy ice cream. In January 2026, the Competition Appellate Tribunal upheld the findings in the ice cream case but cut the fines to Rs 15 million and Rs 5 million.

== Operations ==
Unilever Pakistan operates a network of company-owned and third-party manufacturing sites across the country, with factories in Rahim Yar Khan (personal care and beauty products) and near Lahore (foods), supplemented by third-party manufacturing sites including Futehally Chemicals Limited which produces Surf Excel detergent.

== Brands ==
=== Foods ===
- Knorr soup, noodles & meal mixes
- Hellman's
- Rafhan
- Glaxose-D

=== Beauty, well-being, and personal care ===
- Clear – Anti-dandruff shampoo
- TRESemmé – Shampoo
- Glow & Lovely – Cosmetic products
- Lifebuoy – Soap, handwash, and shampoo
- Lux – Soap, hand, and bodywash
- Pond's – Beauty creams
- Sunsilk – Shampoo
- Dove (soap)

=== Home care ===
- Comfort – fabric softeners
- Surf Excel – detergent and gentle wash.
- Domex
- Vim

=== Former brands ===
- Lipton (tea), demerged into Lipton Teas & Infusions
- Wall's, demerged into Magnum Ice Cream Company
- Magnum, demerged into Magnum Ice Cream Company
- Cornetto, demerged into Magnum Ice Cream Company
