= Vanaspati (disambiguation) =

Vanaspati (Devanāgari: वनस्पति, Sanskrit for "lord of the forest") is primarily a term for a large fruit-bearing tree, especially a fig-tree. It may also refer to:

- the plant kingdom in general, see Vanaspati
- a sacrificial post in Vedic ritual, see historical Vedic religion
- a name of Soma
- a name of Kīrtimukha
- a Carnatic raga, see Vanaspati (Raga)
- Dalda - also known as Vanaspati ghee, is a type of shortening or hydrogenated vegetable fat
