= Karl August Senff =

Baltic German painter

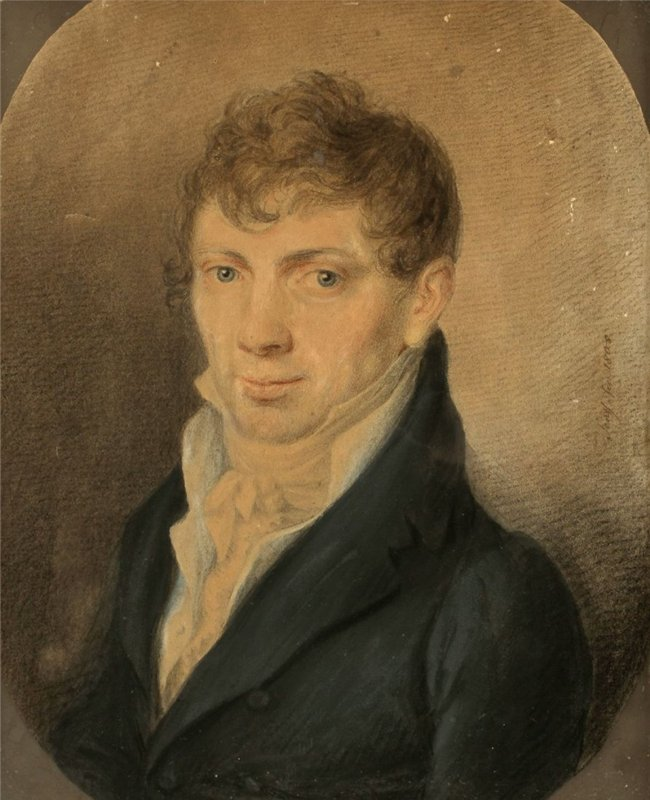
- Self-Portrait, 1808
- Born: 12 March 1770; Kreypau, Amt Merseburg, Electorate of Saxony
- Died: 14 January [O.S. 2] 1838 (aged 67); Dorpat, Kreis Dorpat, Governorate of Livonia, Russian Empire (present-day Tartu, Tartu County, Estonia)
- Education: Leipzig Academy of Arts; Dresden Art Academy
- Known for: Founded school of art at the Imperial University of Dorpat in 1802

Karl August Senff (12 March 1770 – 14 January [O.S. 2] 1838) was a Baltic German painter, engraver and teacher. He is best known for his etchings of famous German and Baltic German military figures in service to the Imperial Russian Army. He served as professor of drawing at the Imperial University of Dorpat (now University of Tartu) from its reopening in 1802 until his death in 1838 where he trained some of Estonia's most celebrated artists.

== Life and work ==
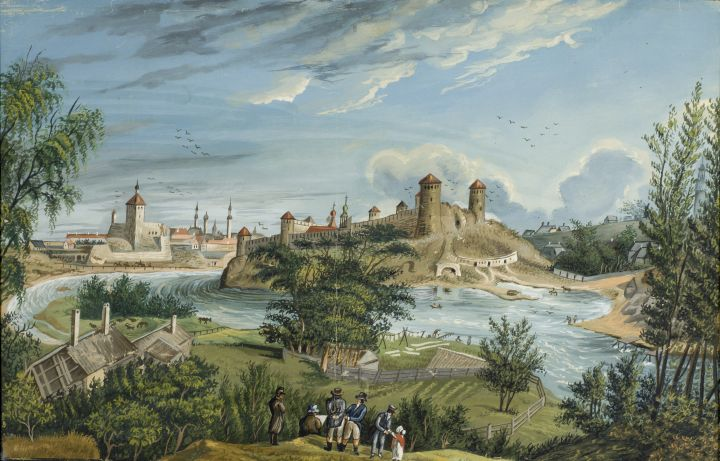
An example of Senff's landscape painting, "A View on Narva" (1812). Gouache on paper.

Senff was born in the village of Kreypau, Kingdom of Prussia. The son of Karl Friedrich Senff, a Protestant theologian, he had originally planned to study medicine at Halle but by 1788 had transferred to the Leipzig Academy of Arts to study painting with the German etcher, painter and sculptor Adam Friedrich Oeser. Oeser zealously opposed mannerism in art and was a stout champion of Johann Joachim Winckelmann's advocacy of reform on antique lines. As director of the newly founded academy, he insisted on an aesthetic of austerity in art that was mingled with philosophies of Lutheranism. This approach greatly influenced Senff, and would be made manifest in his work throughout his life as well as later in his treatises on teaching painting and drawing.

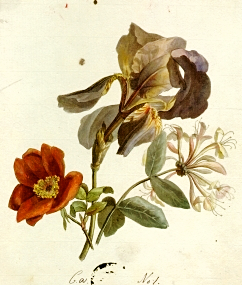
"Iris, Rose, and Honeysuckle" from Senff's instructional booklets on painting, c. 1810.

In 1795, feeling that he'd reached the limit of his progress under Oeser's supervision, Senff left the Leipzig Academy and traveled to Dresden to continue his studies at the Dresden Art Academy under the tutelage of eminent Swiss portrait artist Anton Graff and his colleague, the German painter and draughtsman Christian Leberecht Vogel.

Senff had initially focused on portraiture, but received relatively few commissions. He eventually turned to engraving, seeing it as a more democratic art form. Some of his best known subjects included Estonians in the service of the Russian government, including Count Pyotr Wittgenstein. In Germany at the turn of the 19th century, the Sturm und Drang movement in literature began to shift the perception of man's relationship to the world and, though Senff would create images of the movement's major players (including Friedrich Maximilian Klinger who wrote the drama that gave the epoch its name), his work remained quite conservative. At the outset of the movement, his canvasses began to resemble the Biedermeier style whereby, according to art historian Sergey Kuznetsov, "portraits, landscapes and still-lifes were painted with equal scrupulousness." Kuznetsov notes that unlike the burgeoning group of Romantic artists of the period, "Senff’s landscapes are completely purged of feeling, and they focus on the accurate and precise representation of detail." Senff's work has been frequently compared to Ivan Khrutsky in Vilnius.

Until 1802, Senff pursued his studies along with work as a freelance artist of modest success. In 1803 he was offered a position as associate professor of drawing and etching at the recently reopened Imperial University of Dorpat in present-day Tartu, Estonia. He became head of the program in 1818, and worked there until his death. During his tenure at the school, he developed a new methodology for teaching practical art and illustration that was, at the time, essential for recording research in fields such as biology, physics, engineering, and human anatomy. He compiled a seven-volume textbook with his own copper etchings and watercolor plates to teach illustration and painting techniques to entering students at the Universität Dorpat. Three booklets were dedicated to drawing flowers, which Senff considered an important step for all in learning to paint. He required all his students to master the modelling of petals and leaves before moving on to landscape painting and then people. Other portions focused on the illustration of scientific publications, and many of his extant plates and etchings continue to be used as illustrations in history books today.

== Legacy ==
Several of Senff's pupils that would go on to become world-renowned artists, including August Philipp Klara, August Friedrich Schuch, Friedrich Ludwig von Maydell and August Matthias Hagen.

In addition to his mentorship of young artists, Senff also served as guardian to his nephew Karl Friedrich Knorre, son of Senff's sister Sophie and the German astronomer Ernst Friedrich Knorre following the latter's death in 1801. Senff secured the talented young boy a place at the University at the age of fifteen, where he studied with scientist Wilhelm Struve before going on to found the Nikolayev Astronomical Observatory in 1827.
