= Penthesilea (disambiguation) =

Penthesilea was an Amazonian queen in Greek mythology.

Penthesilea may also refer to:

- 271 Penthesilea, a large main belt asteroid
- Penthesilea (Kleist), a tragedy by Heinrich von Kleist
- Penthesilea (opera), a one-act opera by Othmar Schoeck
- Penthesilea (moth), a genus of moths
- Penthesilea (fly), a genus of fly, now in the genus Criorhina
- Penthesilea Painter, a Greek vase painter
