= Knorr (surname) =

Knorr is a German surname derived from the word knorre meaning "knot", "cartilage knot" used as a nickname for a short, fat person. Notable people with the surname include:

- Brian Knorr (born 1963), American football coach
- Carl Heinrich Theodor Knorr (1800–1875), German businessman and founder of the company Knorr.
- Christian Knorr von Rosenroth (1636–1689), Christian Hebraist
- Christy Knorr, American politician
- Eduard von Knorr (1840–1920), German admiral
- Emely Knorr (born 1986), German politician
- Ernst-Lothar von Knorr (1896–1973), German composer
- Frances Knorr (1868–1894), English-Australian baby farmer and murderer
- Fred Knorr (1913–1960), American radio executive
- Georg Knorr (1859–1911), engineer and entrepreneur in railroad technology
- Georg Wolfgang Knorr (1705–1761) German natural history illustrator from Nürnberg
- Hugo Knorr (1834–1904), German painter
- Iwan Knorr (1853–1916), German teacher of music
- Johnny Knorr (1921–2011), American musician and big band leader
- Karen Knorr, American photographer
- Karin Knorr Cetina (born 1944), Austrian sociologist
- Ludwig Knorr (1859–1921), German chemist
- Martin J. Knorr (1906–1989), New York politician
- Michael Knorr (born 2000), American baseball player
- Micah Knorr (born 1975), NFL football player
- Nathan Homer Knorr (1905–1977), third president of the Watchtower Bible and Tract Society
- Randy Knorr (born 1968), American baseball player
- Robert Knorr (1865–1946), German historian, Roman ceramologist (sigillata)
- Theresa Knorr (born 1946), American woman who murdered two children
- Wilbur Knorr (1945–1997), American historian of mathematics and a professor

== See also ==
- Knörr
- Knorre
