= 1042 Amazone =

Dark asteroid and slow rotator

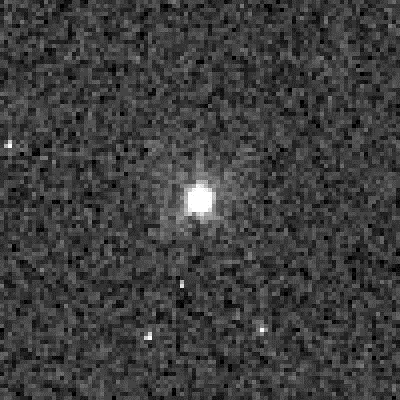
- Hubble Space Telescope image of Amazone taken in 2013

Discovery
- Discovered by: K. Reinmuth
- Discovery site: Heidelberg Obs.
- Discovery date: 22 April 1925

Designations
- Pronunciation: German: [ˈaːmaːtsoːnə]
- Named after: Ἀμαζών Amazōn (Greek mythology)
- Alternative designations: 1925 HA
- Minor planet category: main-belt · (outer)

Orbital characteristics
- Epoch 4 September 2017 (JD 2458000.5)
- Uncertainty parameter 0
- Observation arc: 92.18 yr (33,669 days)
- Aphelion: 3.5294 AU
- Perihelion: 2.9518 AU
- Semi-major axis: 3.2406 AU
- Eccentricity: 0.0891
- Orbital period (sidereal): 5.83 yr (2,131 days)
- Mean anomaly: 221.26°
- Mean motion: 0° 10^{m} 8.4^{s} / day
- Inclination: 20.702°
- Longitude of ascending node: 52.440°
- Argument of perihelion: 296.19°

Physical characteristics
- Dimensions: 63.920±0.102 km 65.823±0.307 km 71.88±1.08 km 73.59 km (derived); 73.64±1.8 km
- Synodic rotation period: 16.26±0.02 h (outdated); 540±30 h (Note: Lightcurve plot of 1042 Amazone with a period of 540±30 hours; observations taken Palmer Divide Observatory by Brian D. Warner (2005))
- Geometric albedo: 0.0358 (derived); 0.0392±0.002; 0.042±0.002; 0.0490±0.0106; 0.054±0.006
- Spectral type: P · X · C
- Absolute magnitude (H): 9.8 · 9.89±0.26 · 9.9

1042 Amazone, provisional designation 1925 HA, is a dark asteroid and slow rotator in the outer asteroid belt, approximately 70 kilometers in diameter. It was discovered on 22 April 1925, by German astronomer Karl Reinmuth at Heidelberg Observatory in southern Germany. It is named after the Amazons from Greek mythology.

== Orbit and classification ==
Amazone orbits the Sun in the outer main-belt at a distance of 3.0–3.5 AU once every 5 years and 10 months (2,131 days). Its orbit has an eccentricity of 0.09 and an inclination of 21° with respect to the ecliptic. The body's observation arc begins three weeks after its official discovery observation.

== Physical characteristics ==
The carbonaceous asteroid has been characterized as a dark and reddish P-type asteroid by the Wide-field Infrared Survey Explorer (WISE), and as an X-type asteroid by Pan-STARRS photometric survey.

=== Diameter and albedo ===
According to the surveys carried out by the Infrared Astronomical Satellite IRAS, the Japanese Akari satellite, and the NEOWISE mission of NASA's WISE space-telescope, Amazone measures between 63.9 and 73.6 kilometers in diameter and its surface has an albedo of 0.039 to 0.054. The Collaborative Asteroid Lightcurve Link derives an albedo of 0.036 and a diameter of 73.6 kilometers.

=== Slow rotator ===
In April 2005, astronomer Brian Warner obtained two divergent rotational lightcurves for Amazone. The longer solution gave a long rotation period of 540 hours with a brightness variation of 0.25 magnitude (U=2) The astronomer assumes the full lightcurve to be bimodal, having two maximums and minimums per rotation.

== Naming ==
Based on a proposal by Gustav Stracke, the asteroid was named after the Amazons, a race of woman warriors in Greek mythology. They had no men and joined with their neighbors, killed the sons and educated the daughters of whom the teats were burnt so that they could discharge the arrows more rapidly. The asteroids 271 Penthesilea and 10295 Hippolyta were named after queens of the Amazons, while 5143 Heracles was named after the hero who fought them.
