= Harvey Duncan Dalda film =

The Dalda film was an advertisement created for the marketing campaign in 1939 for a vanaspati (cooking fat) brand called Dalda. It was conceived by Harvey Duncan of LINTAS Ad Agency, and created in 1939 by Bombay Talkies. The film was shown from a cinema van that went around remote countrysides showing the film to villagers. The van was shaped like a huge round tin to imitate the product packaging.

The 1200-ft film is the second known screen motion film based advertisement in India, the first being a 1931 advertisement for a GM Chevrolet.
