= Knörr =

Knörr is a German-language surname. It is a phonetic variant of Knorr, with the umlaut performing a hypocoristic function.

There is also a Spanish family Knörr.

Notable people with the surname include:

- Jacqueline Knörr, German anthropologist
- Gorka Knörr (born 1950), Spanish songwriter and politician
- Henrike Knörr (1947-2008), Spanish philologist and academic with interests in Basque language
- Marta Knörr Jiménez (born 1968), Spanish singer
- Volker Knörr (born 1976), German politician, district administrator of district Rhein-Pfalz-Kreis

== See also ==
- Knorr
- Knorre
