= 215 Oenone =

Main-belt asteroid

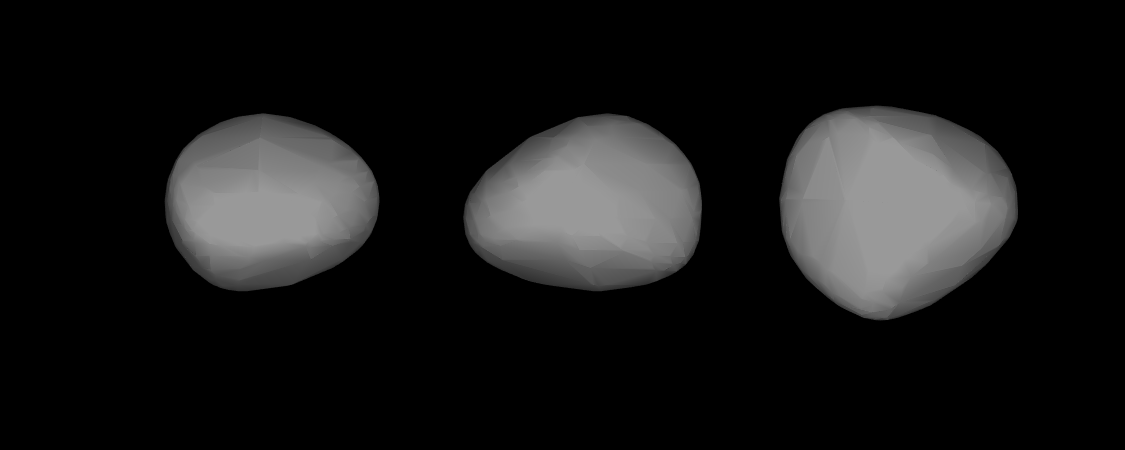
- Lightcurve-based 3D model of 215 Oenone

Discovery
- Discovered by: Viktor Knorre
- Discovery date: 7 April 1880

Designations
- Pronunciation: /iːˈnoʊniː/
- Named after: Oenōnē
- Alternative designations: A880 GA
- Minor planet category: Main belt

Orbital characteristics
- Epoch 31 July 2016 (JD 2457600.5)
- Uncertainty parameter 0
- Observation arc: 110.31 yr (40,289 d)
- Aphelion: 2.87 AU (428.78 Gm)
- Perihelion: 2.67 AU (398.77 Gm)
- Semi-major axis: 2.77 AU (413.78 Gm)
- Eccentricity: 0.036257
- Orbital period (sidereal): 4.60 yr (1,680.2 d)
- Average orbital speed: 17.91 km/s
- Mean anomaly: 90.9597°
- Mean motion: 0° 12^{m} 51.343^{s} / day
- Inclination: 1.68583°
- Longitude of ascending node: 25.0036°
- Argument of perihelion: 315.903°

Physical characteristics
- Dimensions: 46±1 km 48±1 km
- Synodic rotation period: 27.937 h (1.1640 d)
- Geometric albedo: 0.2044±0.011
- Spectral type: S
- Absolute magnitude (H): 9.4

215 Oenone is a typical main belt asteroid. It was discovered by the Russian astronomer Viktor Knorre on April 7, 1880, in Germany, and was the second of his four asteroid discoveries. The asteroid is named after Oenone, a nymph in Greek mythology.

This body is orbiting the Sun with a period of 4.60 years and a low ellipticity (ovalness) of 0.036. The orbital plane is inclined by 1.7° to the plane of the ecliptic. Light curve data gives a synodic rotation period of 27.93±0.01 h, during which it varies in brightness with an amplitude of 0.18±0.02 magnitudes. The cross-section diameter is 36 km. It is classified as an S-type asteroid in the Tholen taxonomy, suggesting a siliceous (stony) composition.

A search of quasi-complanar asteroids has shown that 215 Oenone and 1851 ≡ 1950 VA can approach to within 600 km of each other, one of the closest known potential proximities of astronomical bodies.
