= Knorr =

Knorr may refer to:

- Knorr (surname)
- Knorr (brand), a brand of foods and beverages, particularly known for dehydrated broth
- Knorr-Bremse, manufacturer of braking systems for rail and commercial vehicles
- R/V Knorr, the ship used to find the wreck of the Titanic
- Knorr Arena, in Heilbronn, Germany
- Knorr, older spelling of Knarr, a type of Viking cargo ship
- Koenigs–Knorr reaction, the substitution reaction of a glycosyl halide with an alcohol to give a glycoside
- Knorr pyrrole synthesis, a widely used chemical reaction that synthesizes substituted pyrroles
- Paal–Knorr synthesis, a reaction that generates either furans, pyrroles, or thiophenes from 1,4-diketones
- Knorr quinoline synthesis, an intramolecular organic reaction converting a β-ketoanilide to a 2-hydroxyquinoline using sulfuric acid
