= Koronis family =

Asteroid family

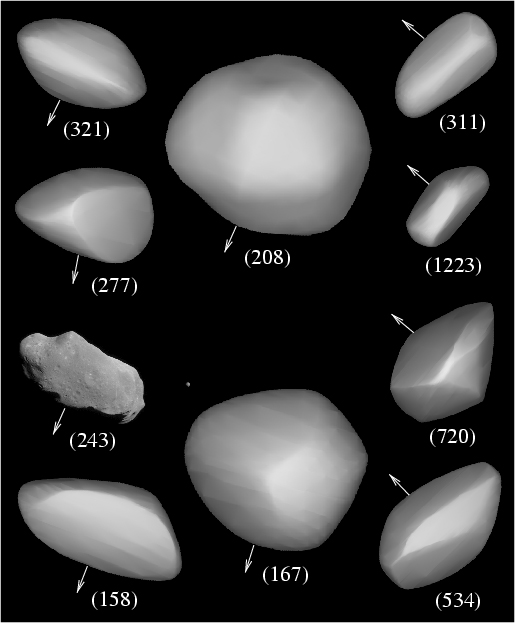
Compilation of CGI Koronis family asteroids from NASA, see Spins on Koronis asteroids

The Koronis or Koronian family (FIN: 605), also known as the Lacrimosa family, is a very large asteroid family of stony asteroids, located in the outer region of the asteroid belt. They are thought to have been formed at least two billion years ago in a catastrophic collision between two larger bodies. The family is named after its lowest-numbered member 158 Koronis, and the largest known member (208 Lacrimosa) is about 41 km (25 mi) in diameter. Koronis family members travel in independent heliocentric orbits which share similar semimajor axes, eccentricities, and inclinations, but the asteroids themselves are not physically clustered in space. The spin poles of several of the large members do appear to be aligned in space. The family has at least 5949 members.

This family has two subfamilies. The Karin family (FIN: 610) was formed remarkably recently in a catastrophic collision (destroying the parent body), with an estimated age of 5.72 million years. The Koronis(2) family (FIN: 621) with 246 members is the other. It formed 15 million years ago by a non-catastrophic collision with 158 Koronis.

On August 28, 1993, the Galileo spacecraft visited a member of this family, 243 Ida. A photo of Ida (and its tiny moon Dactyl) is part of the composite image at right (numbered 243).

== Large members ==
Asteroid		Median diameter	Semi-major axis	Orbital inclination	Orbital eccentricity	Discovered	Refs
158	Koronis	35.4 km	2.867 AU	1.00°	0.057	1876	JPL · MPC
167	Urda	39.9 km	2.855 AU	2.21°	0.035	1876	JPL · MPC
208	Lacrimosa	41.0 km	2.895 AU	1.751°	0.015	1879	JPL · MPC
243	Ida	31.3 km	2.861 AU	1.138°	0.046	1884	JPL · MPC
263	Dresda	23.0 km	2.886 AU	1.314°	0.079	1886	JPL · MPC
277	Elvira	27.0 km	2.887 AU	1.156°	0.089	1888	JPL · MPC
311	Claudia	24.0 km	2.897 AU	3.225°	0.008	1891	JPL · MPC
321	Florentina	27.0 km	2.886 AU	2.594°	0.043	1891	JPL · MPC
534	Nassovia	32.3 km	2.884 AU	3.277°	0.057	1904	JPL · MPC
720	Bohlinia	33.7 km	2.888 AU	2.359°	0.014	1911	JPL · MPC
1223	Neckar	22.8 km	2.869 AU	2.55052º	0.061	1931	JPL · MPC
