= 158 Koronis =

Main-belt asteroid

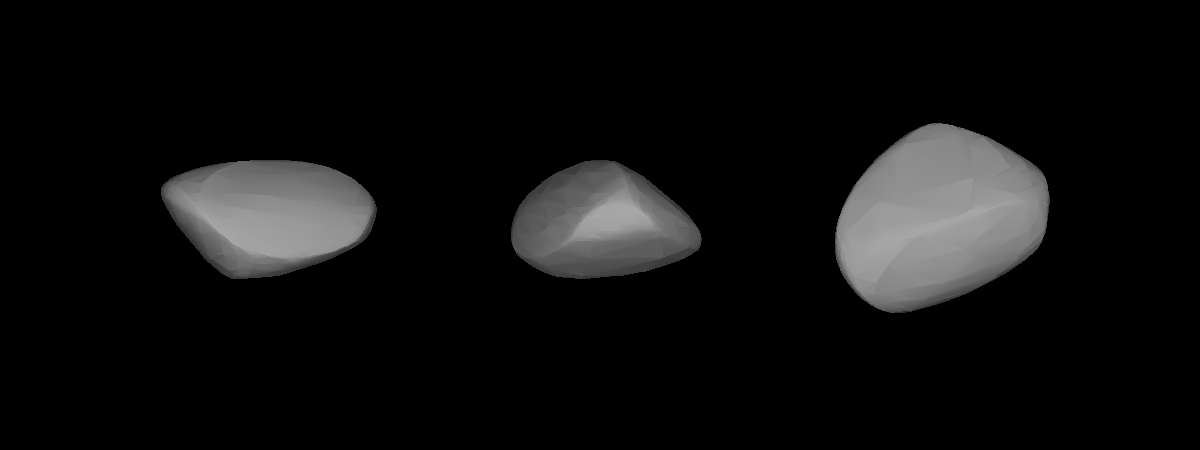
- A three-dimensional model of 158 Koronis based on its lightcurve

Discovery
- Discovered by: Viktor Knorre
- Discovery date: 4 January 1876

Designations
- Pronunciation: /kɒˈroʊnɪs/
- Alternative designations: A876 AA; 1893 PA; 1911 HB; 1955 HA1
- Minor planet category: Main belt
- Adjectives: Koronidian /kɒrəˈnɪdiən/

Orbital characteristics
- Epoch 31 July 2016 (JD 2457600.5)
- Uncertainty parameter 0
- Observation arc: 122.53 yr (44755 d)
- Aphelion: 3.0181 AU (451.50 Gm)
- Perihelion: 2.71904 AU (406.763 Gm)
- Semi-major axis: 2.86858 AU (429.133 Gm)
- Eccentricity: 0.052130
- Orbital period (sidereal): 4.86 yr (1774.6 d)
- Average orbital speed: 17.80 km/s
- Mean anomaly: 15.346°
- Mean motion: 0° 12^{m} 10.296^{s} / day
- Inclination: 1.0015°
- Longitude of ascending node: 277.96°
- Argument of perihelion: 142.37°
- Earth MOID: 1.7299 AU (258.79 Gm)
- Jupiter MOID: 2.16233 AU (323.480 Gm)
- T_{Jupiter}: 3.297

Physical characteristics
- Mean diameter: 38 ± 5 km
- Synodic rotation period: 14.20569 h (0.591904 d)
- Pole ecliptic longitude: 30°
- Pole ecliptic latitude: −64°
- Geometric albedo: 0.2766±0.024
- Spectral type: S
- Absolute magnitude (H): 9.27

158 Koronis is a main-belt asteroid that was discovered by Russian astronomer Viktor Knorre on 4 January 1876, from the Berlin observatory. It was the first of his four asteroid discoveries. The meaning of the asteroid name is uncertain, but it may come from Coronis, the mother of Asclepius from Greek mythology. Alternatively, it may come from Coronis, a nymph of the Hyades sisterhood. The Koronis family is named after this asteroid.

From its spectrum this is classified as an S-type asteroid, indicating a stony composition. Photometric observations show a synodic rotation period of 14.206 ± 0.002 hours with a brightness variation of 0.28–0.43 in magnitude. A subsequent study at the Altimira Observatory during 2010 was in agreement with this estimate, yielding a rotation period of 14.208 ± 0.040 hours. Based on a model constructed from the lightcurve, the shape of Koronis resembles that of 243 Ida, an asteroid in the same family, although it is a bit larger.

A collision involving 158 Koronis 15 million years ago created a cluster of 246 objects. 158 Koronis itself retained 98.7% of the total mass. These new objects formed the Koronis(2) family. Koronis(2) is a subfamily of the much larger Koronis family.
