= Viktor Knorre =

Russian astronomer of German origin (1840–1919)

- Born: Viktor Karlovich Knorre; 4 October 1840; Nikolayev, Russian Empire
- Died: 25 August 1919 (aged 78); Berlin, Germany
- Occupation: Astronomer
- Organization(s): University of Berlin, Berlin Observatory
- Known for: Discovered Koronis and three other minor planets
- Parent: Karl Friedrich Knorre

Viktor Karlovich Knorre (Russian: Виктор Карлович Кнорре; 4 October 1840 – 25 August 1919) was a Russian astronomer of German origin. He worked in Nikolaev, Pulkovo and Berlin and is best known for having discovered 158 Koronis and three other minor planets. Knorre's father, Karl Friedrich Knorre, and grandfather, Ernst Friedrich Knorre, were also prominent astronomers. Recently, the main-belt asteroid 14339 Knorre was named in honor of the three generations of Knorre astronomers.

== Biography and family background ==
Knorre was born into a three-generation astronomer family. His grandfather, Ernst Friedrich Knorre (1759–1810), had moved from Germany to Dorpat (now Tartu, Estonia) where he worked (1803–10) as Observator for the Dorpat observatory (opened in 1802) and professor of mathematics at the University of Dorpat. Victor Knorre's father, Karl Friedrich Knorre (1801–1883), set up and was director of the Nikolayev Astronomical Observatory starting in 1827.

Viktor was born the fifth of fifteen children in Nikolayev (now Mykolaiv, Ukraine). He moved to Berlin in 1862 to study astronomy with Wilhelm Julius Foerster. He worked at Pulkovo Observatory in 1867 as an astronomical calculator and then at Berlin Observatory, where his father moved circa 1871.

== Astronomer ==
From 1873, he was observer at the Berlin Observatory. Knorre discovered four asteroids. He did not teach students at the University of Berlin; instead he gave introductions into the use of the telescopes of the Observatory. In 1892 he was appointed Professor of Astronomy. Knorre took an interest in the improvement of astronomical equipment, and published papers on an improved equatorial telescope mount, referred to as the "Knorre & Heele" mount.

Minor planets discovered: 4
158 Koronis	4 January 1876	MPC
215 Oenone	7 April 1880	MPC
238 Hypatia	1 July 1884	MPC
271 Penthesilea	13 October 1887	MPC

== Chess master ==
Knorre was also known as a strong chess player, playing among others against Adolf Anderssen, Gustav Neumann and Johannes Zukertort. He took part in several chess tournaments during the 1860s. According to the ChessMetrics site, He was ranked among top 50 players in the world at his peak.

In the Two Knights Defense, the Knorre Variation (ECO code C59) is named after him. Continuing from the main line, it is characterized by the moves 8.Be2 h6 9.Nf3 e4 10.Ne5 Bd6 11.d4 Qc7 12.Bd2. The Knorre variation of the Open defense in the Ruy Lopez, characterized by the move 6. Nc3, is also named after Knorre.
