= 208 Lacrimosa =

Main-belt asteroid

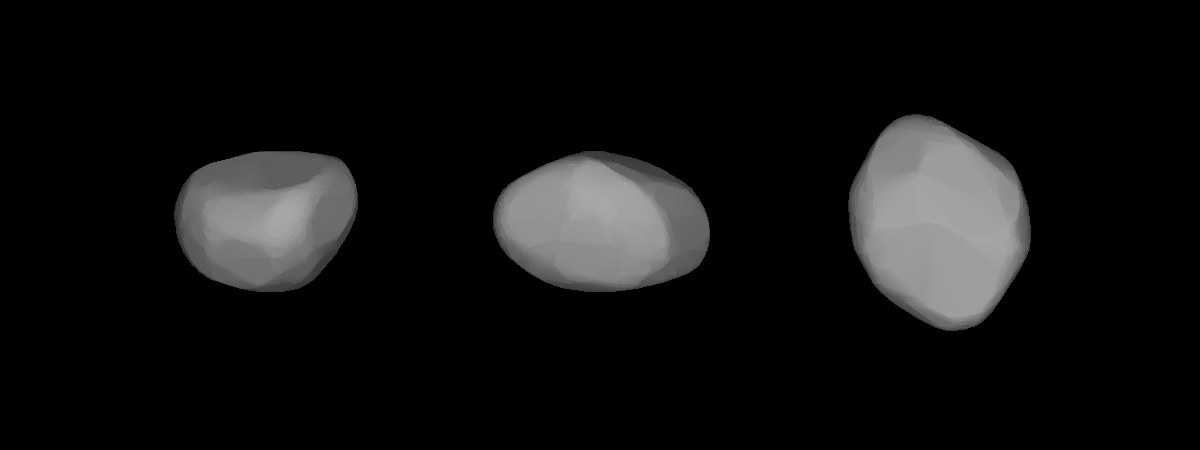
- A three-dimensional model of 208 Lacrimosa based on its lightcurve

Discovery
- Discovered by: Johann Palisa
- Discovery date: 21 October 1879

Designations
- Pronunciation: /lækrɪˈmoʊsə/
- Named after: Our Lady of Sorrows (lacrimōsa)
- Alternative designations: A879 UB
- Minor planet category: Main belt (Koronis)

Orbital characteristics
- Epoch 31 July 2016 (JD 2457600.5)
- Uncertainty parameter 0
- Observation arc: 115.12 yr (42,049 d)
- Aphelion: 2.9309 AU (438.46 Gm)
- Perihelion: 2.85551 AU (427.178 Gm)
- Semi-major axis: 2.89320 AU (432.817 Gm)
- Eccentricity: 0.013028
- Orbital period (sidereal): 4.92 yr (1,797.5 d)
- Average orbital speed: 17.51 km/s
- Mean anomaly: 209.78°
- Mean motion: 0° 12^{m} 1.008^{s} / day
- Inclination: 1.7458°
- Longitude of ascending node: 4.2626°
- Argument of perihelion: 108.363°

Physical characteristics
- Mean diameter: 44±2 km
- Mean density: 2 g/cm^{3} (assumed)
- Synodic rotation period: 14.085734±0.000007 h
- Axial tilt: 22.4°
- Pole ecliptic longitude: 15° ± 2°
- Pole ecliptic latitude: 67° ± 2°
- Geometric albedo: 0.2696±0.023
- Spectral type: S
- Absolute magnitude (H): 8.96

208 Lacrimosa is a main-belt asteroid that was discovered by Austrian astronomer Johann Palisa on October 21, 1879, in Pola. The name derives from Our Lady of Sorrows, a title given to Mary, the mother of Jesus. It is orbiting the Sun at a distance of 2.89320 AU with a period of 4.92 yr and an eccentricity (ovalness) of 0.013. The orbital plane is inclined at an angle of 1.7° to the plane of the ecliptic.

During 2003, the asteroid was observed occulting a star. The resulting chords provided a cross-section diameter estimate of 44.3 km. 10μ radiometric data collected from Kitt Peak in 1975 gave a diameter estimate of 42 km for this asteroid. It is classified as an S-type asteroid and is one of the largest members of the Koronis asteroid family. Hence it is probably a piece of the original asteroid that was shattered in an ancient impact that created the family.
