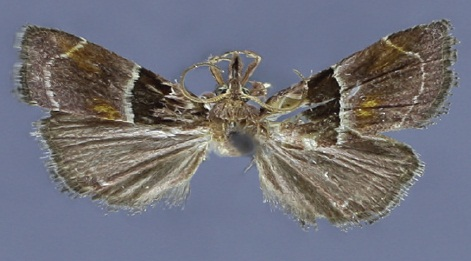
- Penthesilea sacculalis baboquivariensis

Scientific classification
- Domain: Eukaryota
- Kingdom: Animalia
- Phylum: Arthropoda
- Class: Insecta
- Order: Lepidoptera
- Family: Pyralidae
- Genus: Penthesilea
- Species: P. sacculalis

Binomial name
- Penthesilea sacculalis Ragonot, 1891

= Penthesilea sacculalis =

Species of moth

Penthesilea sacculalis is a species of moth of the family Pyralidae. It is found in Florida, Georgia, Louisiana, Texas, North Carolina, Virginia and Arizona.

The wingspan is 13–17 mm (0.51–0.67 in). The forewings are dark brown to fuscous, the basal angle is occasionally overscaled with reddish-brown, the base darker than the distal part. The hindwings are dark brown to fuscous.

== Subspecies ==
- Penthesilea sacculalis sacculalis
- Penthesilea sacculalis baboquivariensis Cashatt in Solis, Cashatt & Scholtens, 2012 (Arizona)
