= Shazia Syed =

Pakistani businesswoman

- Education: Masters in Business Administration
- Alma mater: Clayton State University
- Occupation: businesswoman
- Title: CEO and chairperson of the Unilever Pakistan Limited
- Term: November 2015 —
- Predecessor: Ehsan Ali Malik

Shazia Syed is a Pakistani businesswoman who is currently Global EVP - Beverages at Unilever. She was chairperson and CEO of the Unilever Pakistan Limited, in office from November 2015 till February 2020. Prior to that she served as chairperson of the Unilever Sri Lanka from November 2013 to October 2015.

In her 30 years with the organization, she has worked across all departments and divisions of the company.

== Education and personal life ==
Shazia was born in a small village of Khyber-Pakhtunkhwa, in Pakistan. Syed received a master's degree in Business Administration from Clayton State University.

She is married with two children

== Career ==
Syed joined Unilever in October 1989 and began her career as a Management Trainee.

In December 2000, she moved to Vietnam where she was appointed as Business Unit Leader for Personal Care at Unilever Vietnam. She worked there for three years until December 2003.

In January 2004, she returned to Pakistan and worked as Vice President of Marketing for Home and Personal Care at Unilever Pakistan Limited before becoming Vice President of Marketing for Refreshments in 2009.

In April 2009, she was appointed as an executive director of Unilever Pakistan Limited whilst serving as Director of Unilever Pakistan Foods Limited, a subsidiary of Unilever Pakistan listed on the Pakistan Stock Exchange. In 2009, she headed the Ice Cream Business at Unilever Pakistan for a year.

She served as a Non-Executive Director of Unilever Pakistan Foods Limited from January 2010 to March 2016.

She served as an executive director and Vice President of Customer Development at Unilever Pakistan Limited before becoming the first ever women Chairperson of Unilever Sri Lanka Limited in November 2013.

Under Syed's leadership, Unilever Sri Lanka saw the business growth. She remained chairperson at Unilever Sri Lanka until October 2015.

She became executive director at Unilever Pakistan in April 2014.

In November 2015, she became chairperson and CEO at Unilever Pakistan Limited. In March 2016, Syed was given additional charge as the CEO of Unilever Pakistan Foods Limited.

Now she is Global EVP Beverages at Unilever Head Offices Rotterdam.

== Awards and recognition ==
In July 2015, Sri Lanka's Women in Management awarded Syed the award for "Best International Women Leadership".

In 2016, The Express Tribune referred to her as one of Pakistan's most recognised personalities in the corporate world.

She serves as a Director of the Pakistan Business Council, a Member at the Board of Governors of the National Management Foundation, and a trustee at the Duke of Edinburgh's Award Foundation Pakistan.

She was elected unopposed as vice-president of the Overseas Investors Chamber of Commerce and Industry in February 2018.
