= Blue Band =

Blue Band could refer to:

- Blue (English group), an English boy band
- Blue (Scottish band), a Scottish pop rock band
- Bruford Levin Upper Extremities or B.L.U.E., a 1990s British rock group
- Penn State Blue Band, the marching band of Pennsylvania State University
