= Karl Friedrich Knorre =

Russian astronomer (1801–1883)

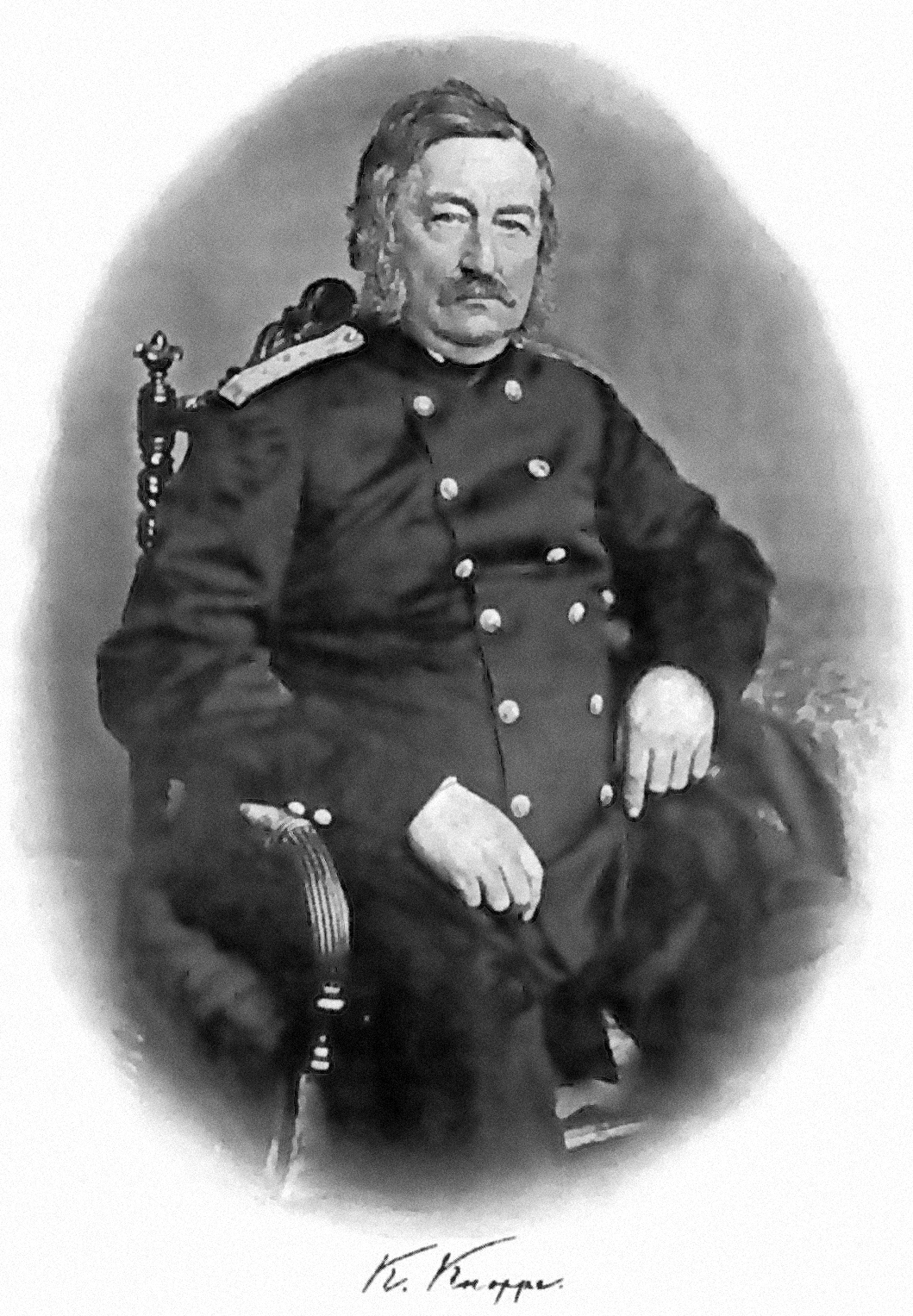
- Born: 28 March 1801; Dorpat, Russian Empire
- Died: 29 August 1883 (aged 82); Berlin, German Empire
- Education: Universität Dorpat
- Organization: Royal Astronomical Society
- Known for: Founding the Nikolayev Astronomical Observatory
- Children: Viktor Knorre
- Parent: Ernst Friedrich Knorre
- Awards: Gold Medal, Academy of Sciences (1846); Order of St. Anna, 1st Class (1870)

Karl Khristoforovich Friedrich Knorre (Russian: Карл Христофорович Кнорре; 28 March 1801 – 29 August 1883) was a Russian astronomer of Baltic German ethnic origin who is best known for founding the Nikolayev Astronomical Observatory in 1827. Knorre's father, Ernst Friedrich Knorre, and his son, Viktor Knorre, were also prominent astronomers. Recently NASA named an asteroid in honor of the three generations of Knorre astronomers.

== Life and work ==
Knorre was born in Dorpat, Russian Empire in present-day Estonia, the son of Ernst Friedrich Knorre, a German-born astronomer, and his wife Sophie (née Senff). Although Knorre's father died in 1801 when he was just 9 years old, the elder scientist's career as a professor of mathematics at the Universität Dorpat where he was also chief Observator for the Dorpat observatory, had already made a strong impression on the young boy who applied himself enthusiastically to the study of math and science. He gave private lessons in mathematics and Latin to other pupils of his school and even to adults, earning enough money to help his impoverished mother to pay for his education.

The family had taken refuge with Knorre's uncle, Karl August Senff, a professor of painting at the university and with his help, Knorre was able to enter into a course of study there at the age of 15. Knorre was determined to continue in his father's footsteps as an astronomer, taking up the bulk of his unfinished work, but Senff felt that the clergy was a more secure means of self-support for a poor orphan, and urged him to study theology. Although he dutifully entered into the divinity program, Knorre still managed to attend several astronomy lectures and became devoted to the subject, largely educating himself in the ensuing years.

He eventually availed himself to the new head of the observatory, Wilhelm Struve, who agreed to accept Knorre as an assistant. Under Struve's tutelage, Knorre had the opportunity to acquire a decisive experience in geodesy and had earned such esteem by the age of nineteen that Struve recommended him to Admiral Aleksey Greig who was looking for "a young and intelligent astronomer, able to help him to equip an observatory in Nikolayev on the Black Sea."

The challenge for Knorre was the equipment of the observatory. He asked for a business trip to tour the other important observatories of Europe, and when Greig agreed, set off on a journey by stagecoach that was to take more than two years. In Germany, he visited Friedrich Bessel, Johann Franz Encke, and Heinrich Christian Schumacher and, in Paris, he called on François Arago. From there he also went to both Greenwich and Dublin, largely in pursuit of manufacturers of good chronographs. Back home he discussed with admiral Greig his impressions and ordered the equipment for the observatory. In his equipment there was a mercuric artificial horizon mirror. To exclude measurement failures it was possible to look with the telescope direct to the stars or indirect via the mercurial mirror.

Knorre was member of the Royal Astronomical Society. He was married three times, first to Elisabeth of Dieterichs (m. 1829) who died just three years later, next to her younger sister Dorothea von Dieterichs (m. 1833) who died at the age of 37 after giving birth to 13 children, and lastly to Emilie Gavel (m. 1852) who survived him in death. Knorre had fifteen children who survived infancy, of which the best known was his fifth son, the astronomer Viktor Knorre. He moved to Berlin in 1862 to study astronomy. Knorre retired 1871 from the Directorship of the Observatory in Nikolajew and moved to Berlin to be with his son Viktor. He died there in 1883.

== Sources ==
- "Кнорре, Карл Христофорович" . Brockhaus and Efron Encyclopedic Dictionary (in Russian). 1906.
