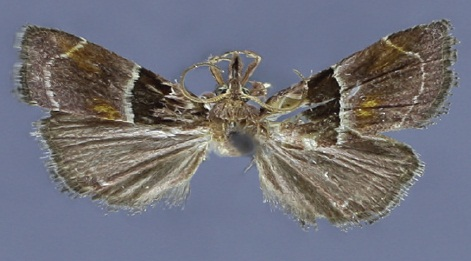
- Penthesilea sacculalis

Scientific classification
- Domain: Eukaryota
- Kingdom: Animalia
- Phylum: Arthropoda
- Class: Insecta
- Order: Lepidoptera
- Family: Pyralidae
- Subfamily: Chrysauginae
- Genus: Penthesilea; Ragonot, 1891

= Penthesilea (moth) =

Genus of moths

Penthesilea is a genus of moths in the family Pyralidae.

== Species ==
- Penthesilea difficilis (C. Felder, R. Felder & Rogenhofer, 1875)
- Penthesilea sacculalis Ragonot, 1891
