= Kreypau =

- Stadtteil of Leuna
- Coat of arms
- Interactive map of Kreypau
- Location within Germany Location within Saxony-Anhalt
- Coordinates: 51°20′N 12°3′E
- Country: Germany
- State: Saxony-Anhalt
- District: Saalekreis
- Town: Leuna

Area
  - Total: 12.38 km^{2} (4.78 sq mi)
- Elevation: 87 m (285 ft)

Population (2006-12-31)
  - Total: 337
  - Density: 27.2/km^{2} (70.5/sq mi)
- Time zone: UTC+01:00 (CET)
  - Summer (DST): UTC+02:00 (CEST)
- Postal codes: 06231
- Dialling codes: 03462

Kreypau (German pronunciation: [ˈkʁaɪpaʊ]) is a village and a former municipality in the district of Saalekreis, in Saxony-Anhalt, Germany. Since 31 December 2009, it is part of the town Leuna.

== Geography ==
Kreypau is located between Leuna and Leipzig on the right bank of the river Saale.

== History ==
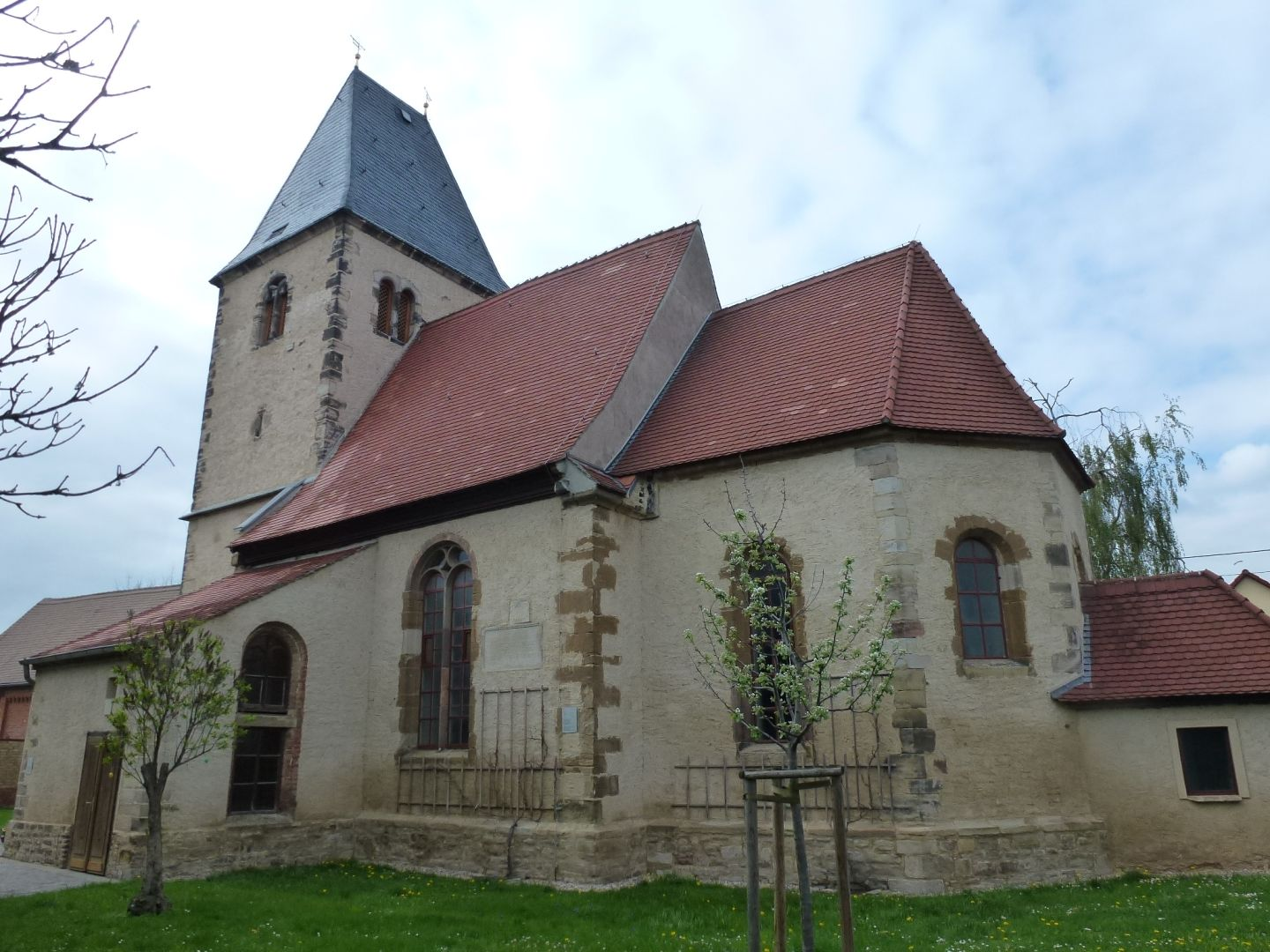
Church in Kreypau

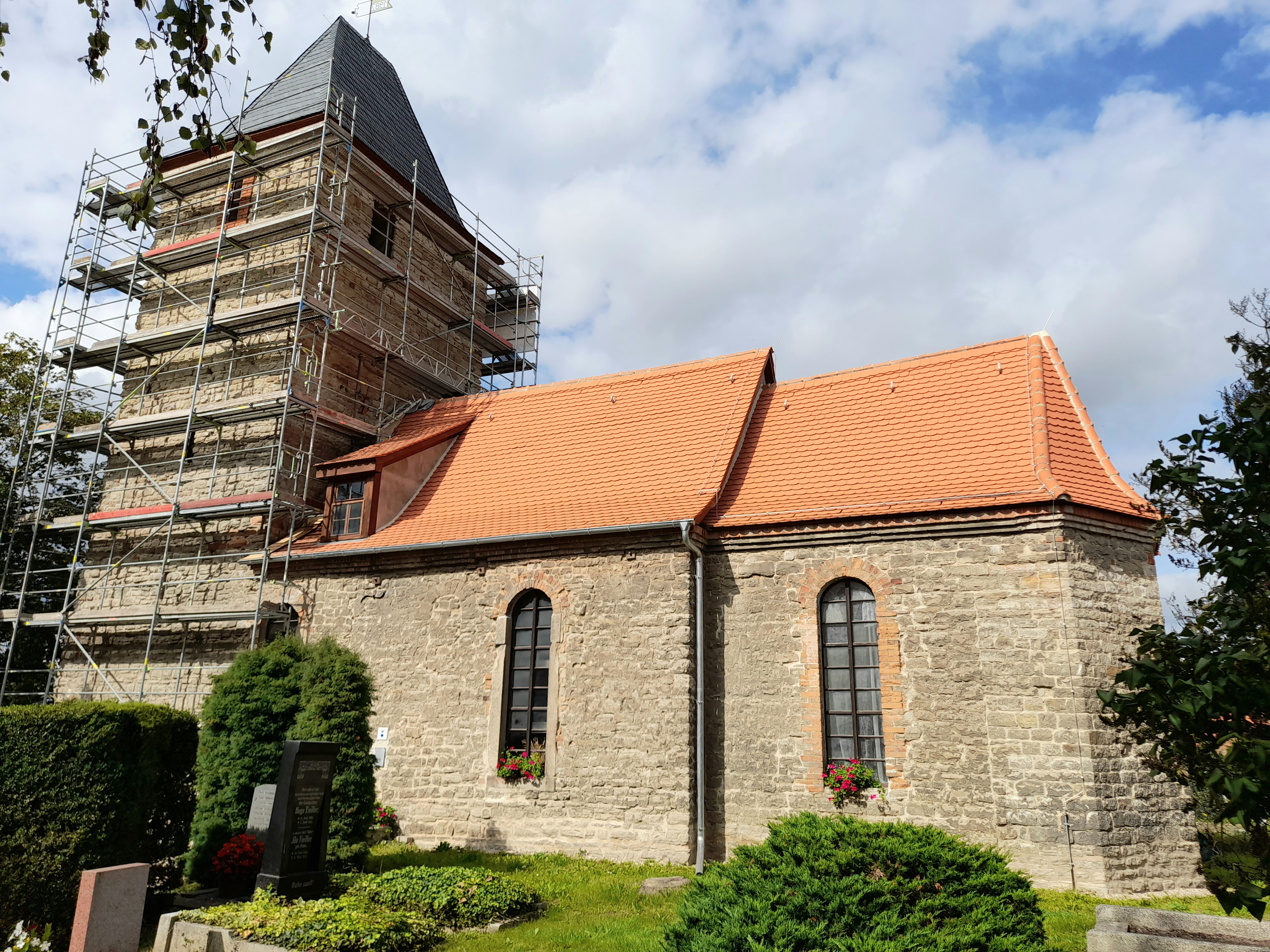
Village church Wölkau, September 2021

Kreypau was a small farming village. The village church was built in 1550/51, the tower in 1530. The village church of Wölkau was not used from 1996 until its renovation on 2018/2019.

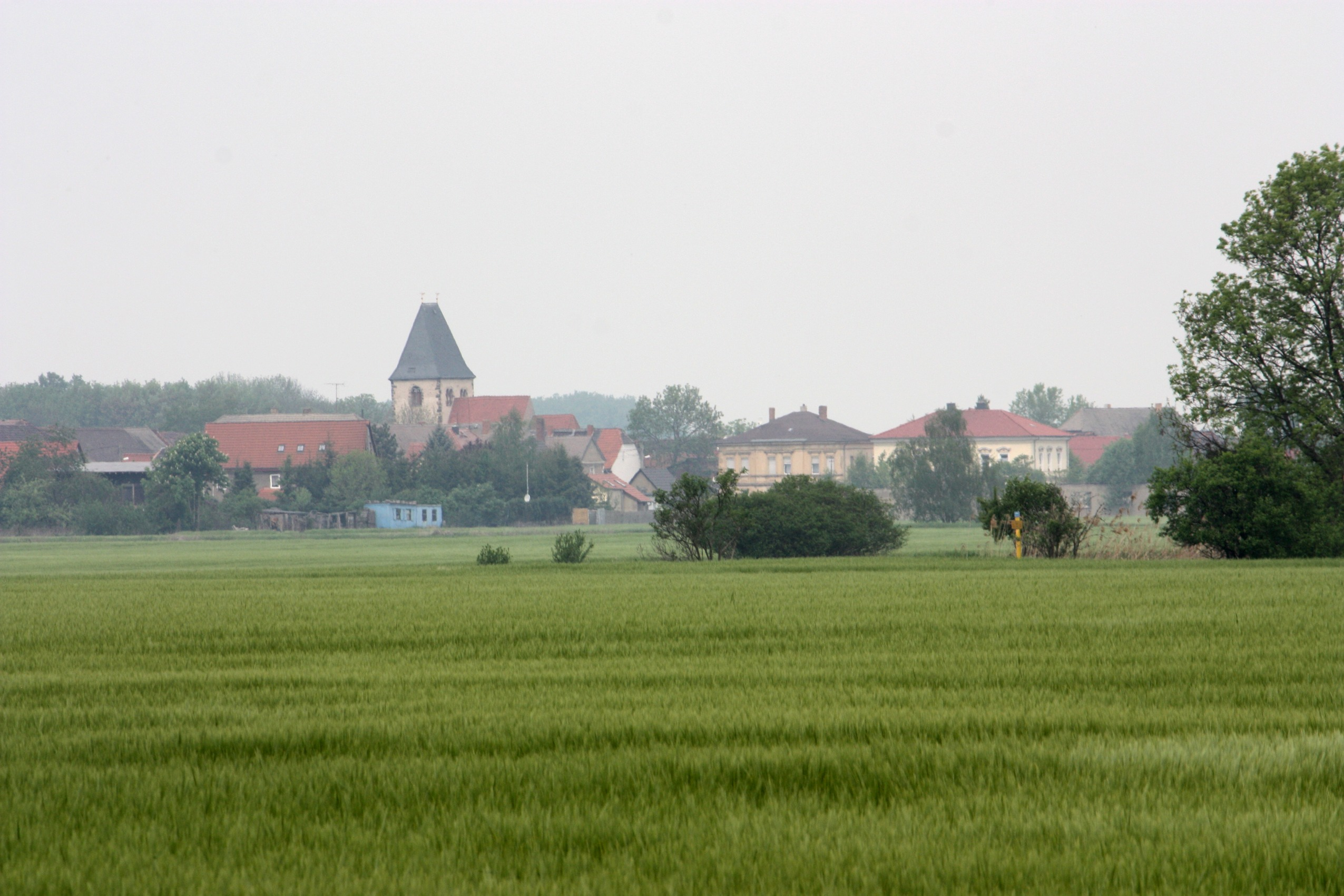
View of the village Kreypau

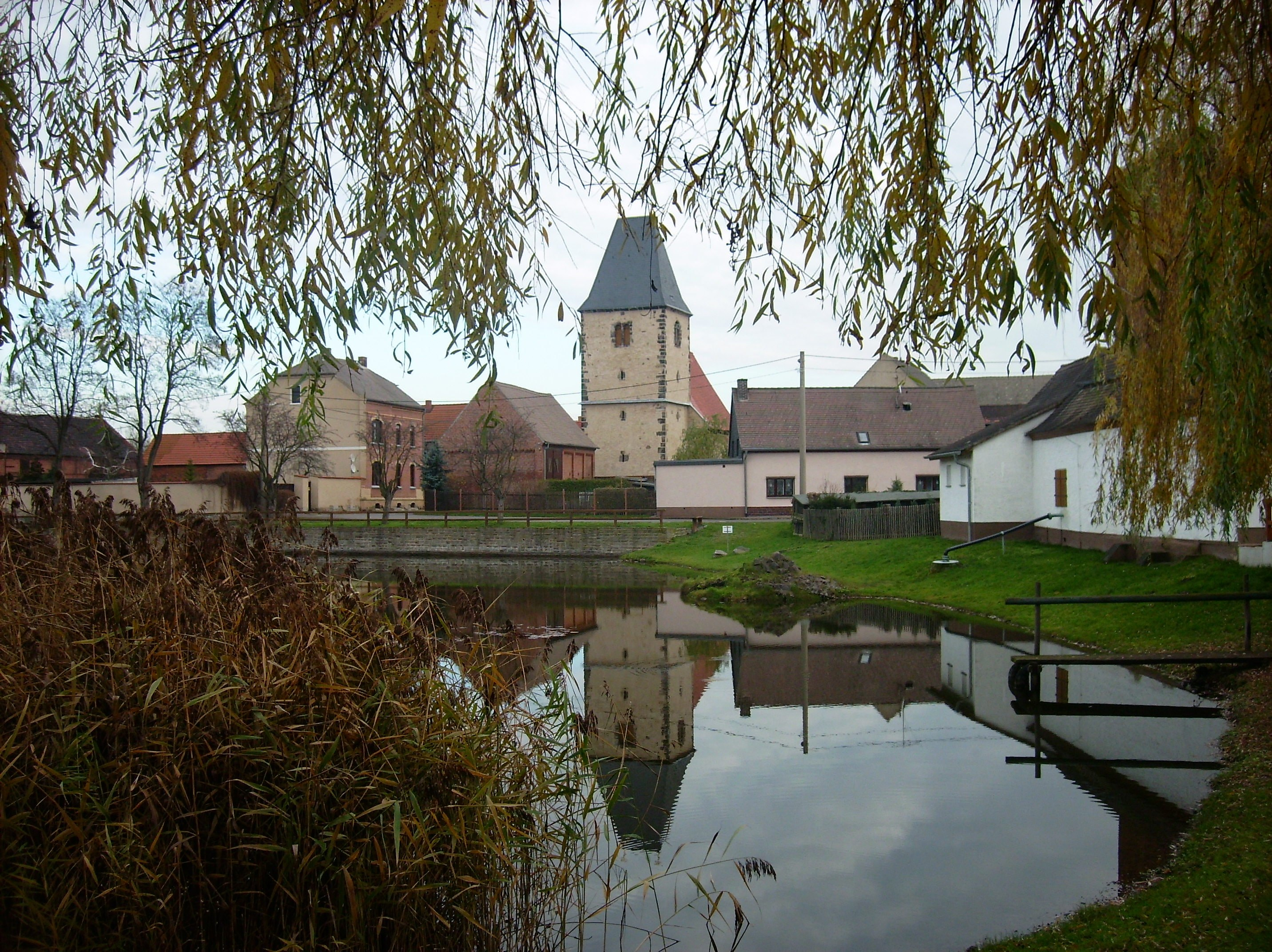
Pond and church in Kreypau

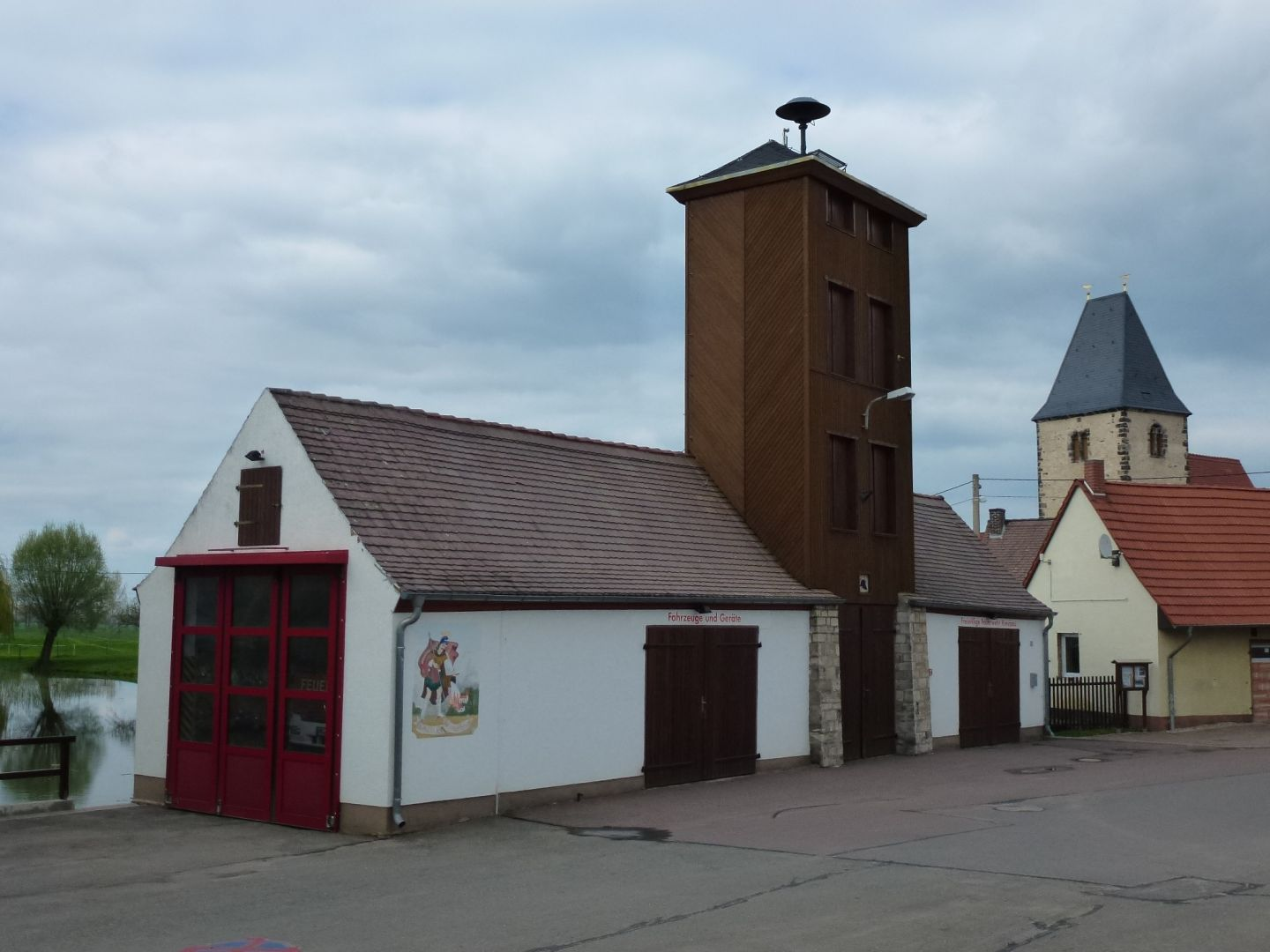
Fire station in Kreypau

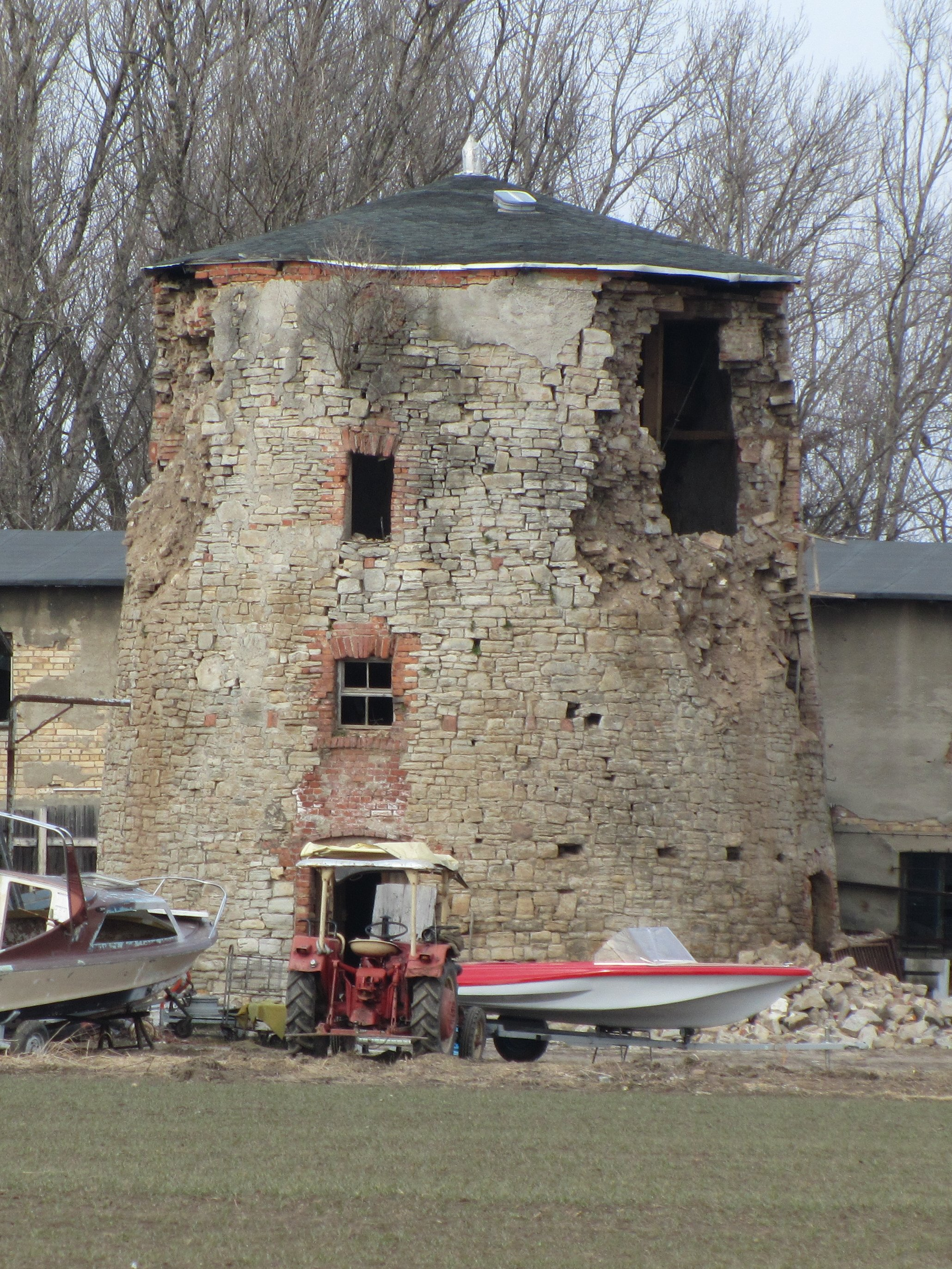
Ruin of windmill in Kreypau, 2011

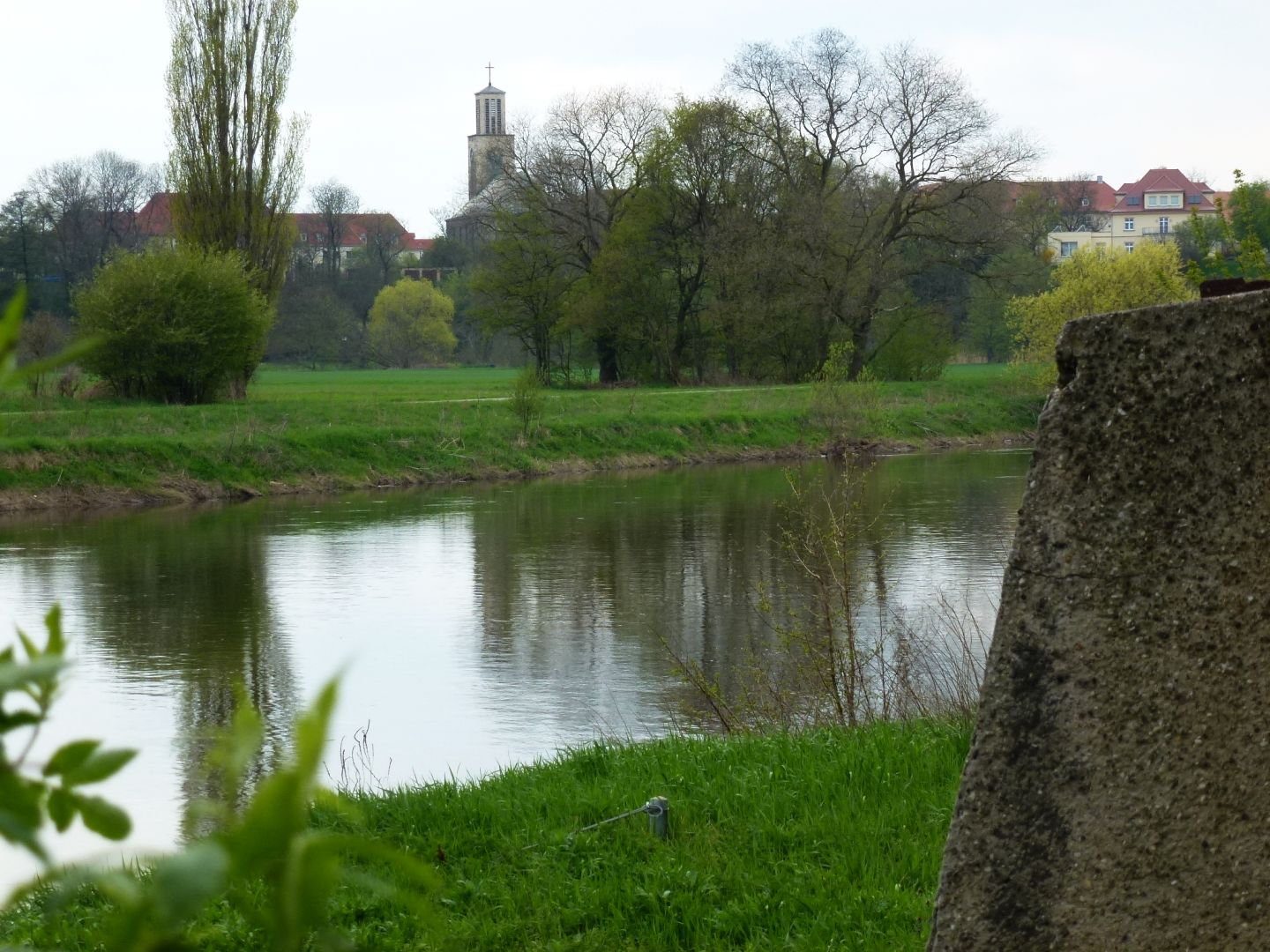
River Saale at former ferry crossing near Kreypau. Leuna is in the background

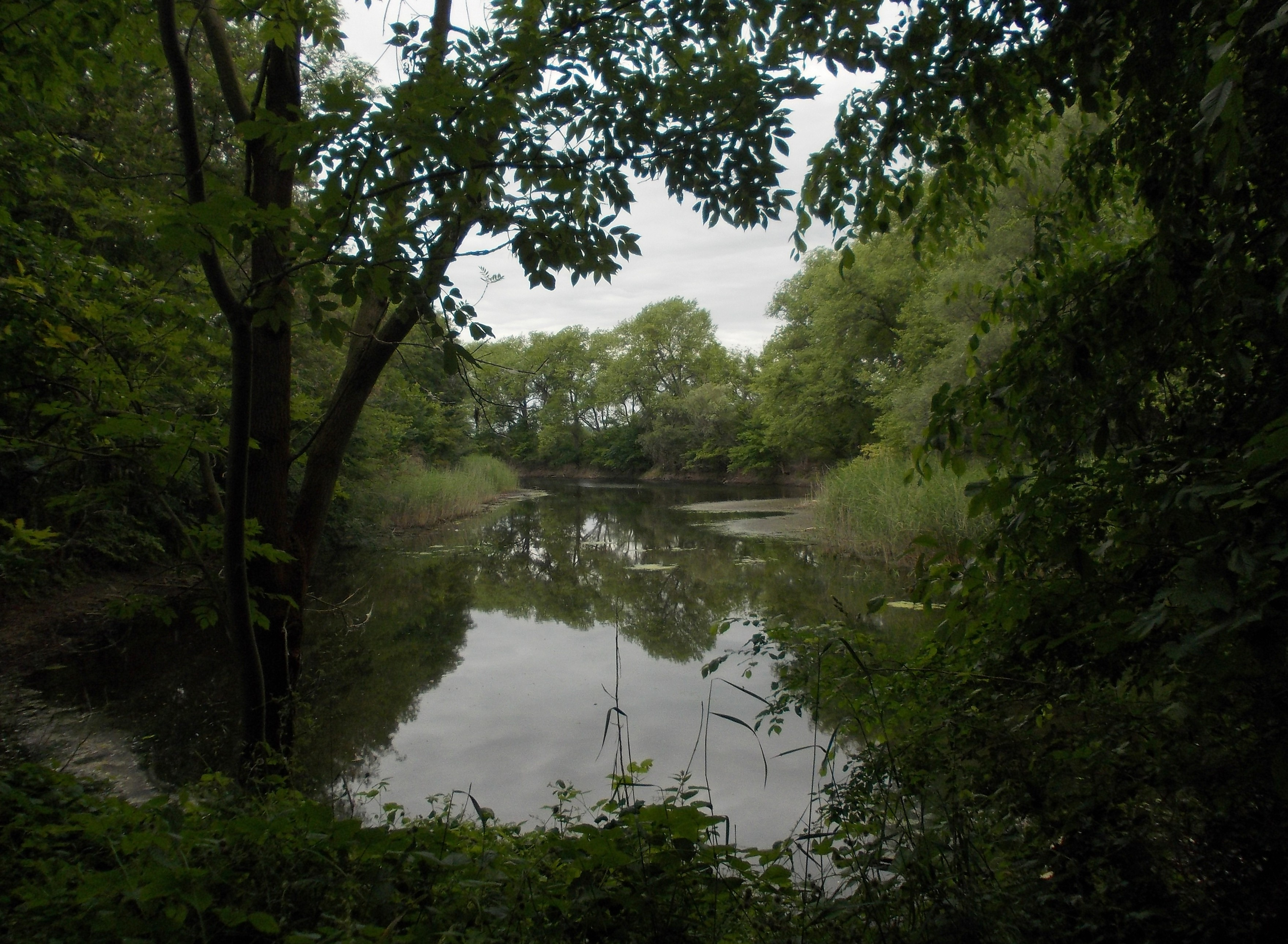
Old Saale riverbed near Kreypau

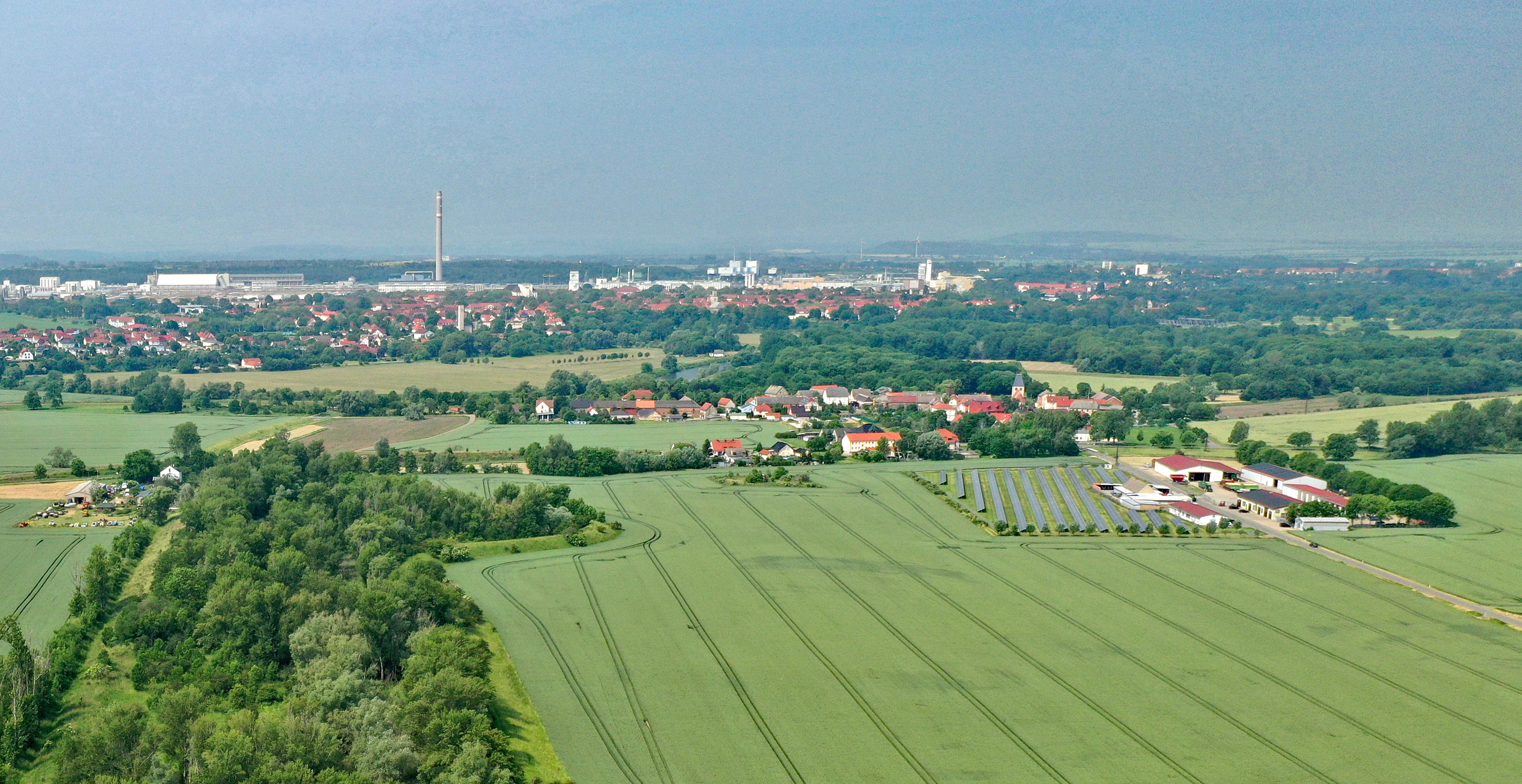
Aerial photo 2021

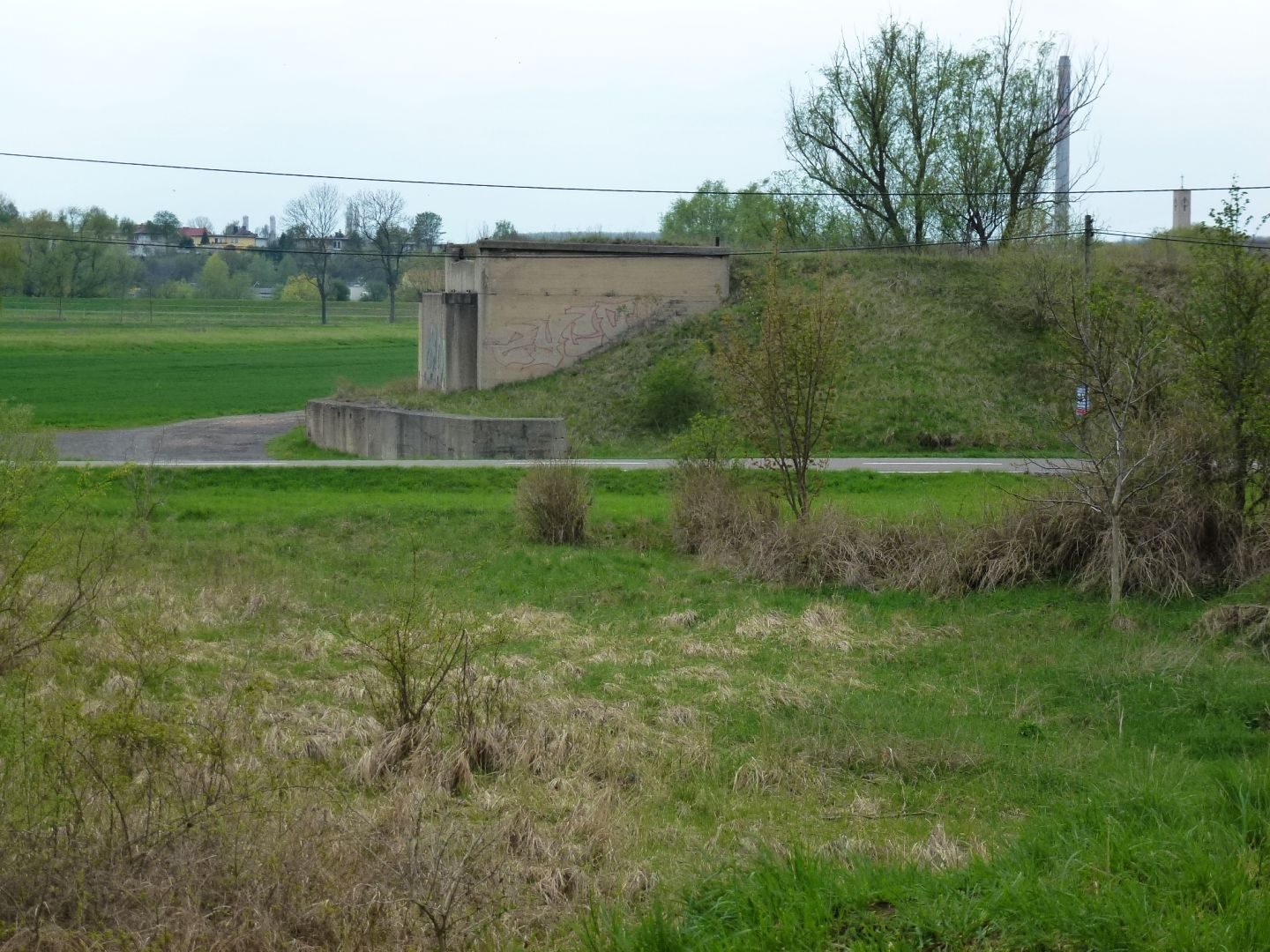
Construction works for the Saale-Elster-Kanal in Kreypau, in the background Leuna

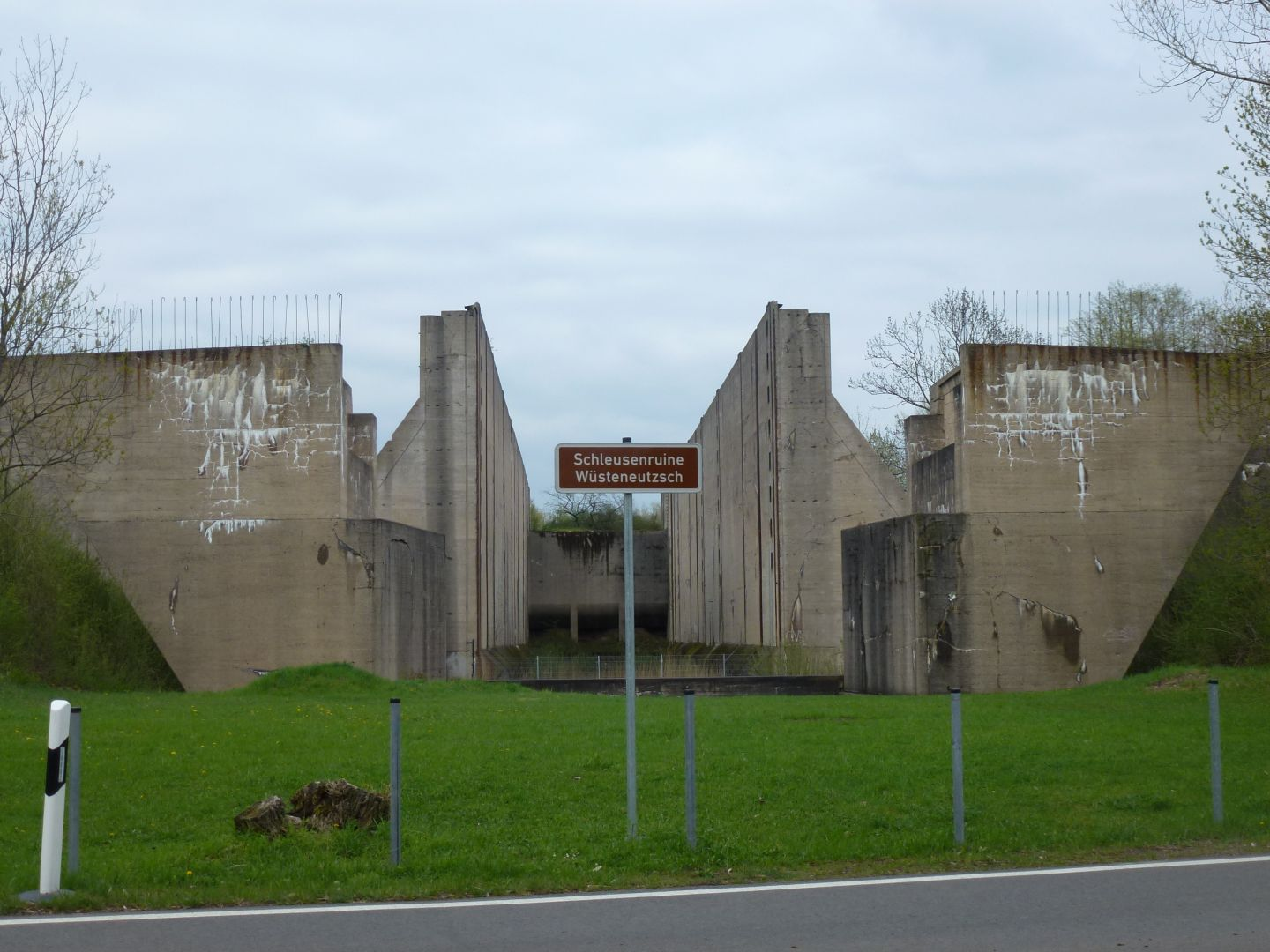
West side of the ruined canal lock, Wüsteneutzsch
