= Johnny Knorr =

American musician (1921–2011)

Johnny Knorr

John C. "Johnny" Knorr (May 24, 1921 in Crissey, Ohio – August 29, 2011) was an American musician and bandleader.

== Career ==
After World War II, Knorr played with several traveling bands. In 1960, he formed his own band. He has shared the stage with Bobby Vinton, Helen O'Connell, Johnny Desmond and played for Bob Hope.

Knorr has been acknowledged for his work to repopularize big band music. For his efforts, he was recognized by Big Bands Magazine in 1984, received an award from the United States Postal Service in 1996, and, later that year, the mayor of Toledo honored him. He also received the People's Choice Award for Performing Arts in 1997 and was inducted into the Lake Erie West Hall of Fame in 1999.

== Personal life ==
Knorr grew up in Toledo, where he learned the violin in school. He was married to Jane Hammer and had two children, Janice and Jerry Knorr. He died age 90 after a battle with leukemia. His son Jerry took the lead of the orchestra after his death.
