= Dalda =

Vegetable ghee popular in South Asia

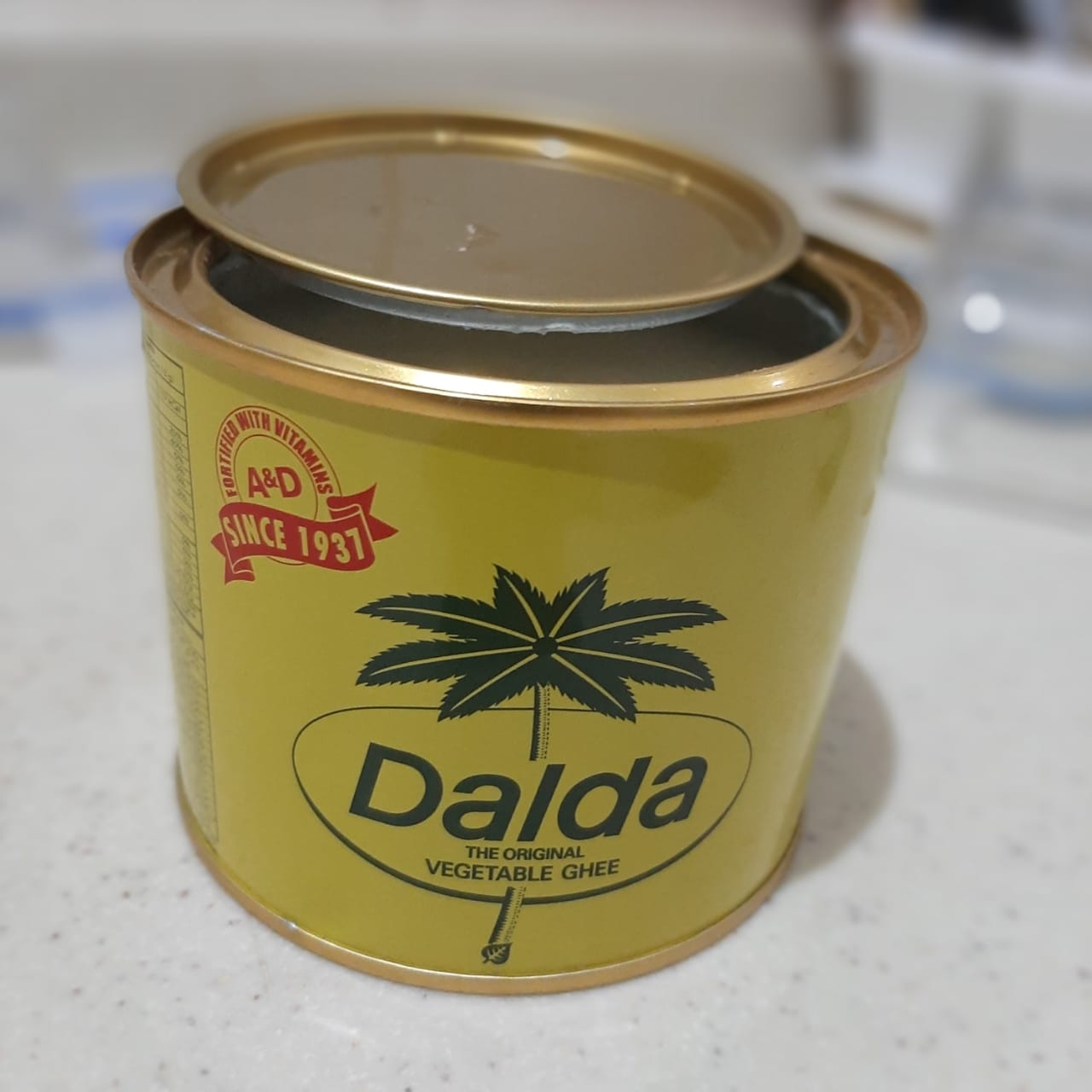
Dalda vegetable ghee

Dalda is a vegetable oil (hydrogenated vegetable cooking oil) brand popular in South Asia (specifically in the Indian region).

== History ==
Dalda (formerly Dada) was the name of the Dutch company that imported vanaspati ghee into India in the 1930s as a cheap substitute for desi ghee or clarified butter. In British India, desi ghee was considered an expensive product and not easily affordable for the common public and was used sparingly in Indian households, hence the need for a cheaper and more affordable substitute.

In 1931, Hindustan Vanaspati Manufacturing Company was incorporated to manufacture synthetic vanaspati ghee. Until the early 1930s, hydrogenated vegetable oil available in India was imported into the country by Hussein Dada and Hindustan Vanaspati Manufacturing Co (now called Hindustan Unilever Limited and Unilever Pakistan). Hindustan Vanaspati wanted to start manufacturing hydrogenated vegetable oil locally and hence a new category of hydrogenated oil under the new brand name Dalda was born. Until then, Hussein Dada had been selling his imported product under the name Dada Vanaspati. He was asked for his cooperation by Lever Brothers to let the company insert the letter 'L' from Lever Brothers into the new brand name to make it Dalda. He agreed to the name change. Dalda was introduced in 1937, becoming one of the longest-running brands in India and Pakistan.

In 1939, The Dalda film was an advertisement created for the marketing campaign for a vanaspati (cooking fat) brand called Dalda. Lintas created India's first multi-media advertising campaign. Hindustan Vanaspati's "Dalda" product came to be synonymous with the genre, to the extent that the main style of hydrogenated vegetable oil is commonly designated generically as "vanaspati ghee". In 2003, Unilever announced the strategic decision to sell off the Dalda brand in both India and Pakistan.

== In India ==
In 2003, Bunge Limited acquired the Dalda brand from Hindustan Unilever Limited for reportedly under Rs. 100 crore. Then Bunge made Dalda an umbrella brand (brand repositioning) and started selling different types of refined oils (soyabean, sunflower, Palmolive, etc) based on geography.

== In Pakistan ==
On 30 March 2004, Unilever Pakistan accepted an offer of Rs.133 crores for the sale of its Dalda brand and related business of edible oils and fats to the newly incorporated company, Dalda Foods (Pvt.) Limited. This was a one-of-a-kind corporate transaction in Pakistan, in which a group of six senior Unilever executives formed a management group and successfully purchased the Dalda business from Unilever Pakistan. This was achieved under the banner of the newly formed company Dalda Foods (Pvt.) Limited with the support of key financial institutions and Pakistan's biggest edible oil importer Westbury Group. In 2017, Dalda Foods was getting ready to get on the Pakistan Stock Exchange.

== See also ==
- Harvey Duncan Dalda film
- Margarine
