= Ernst Friedrich Knorre =

German astronomer (1759–1810)

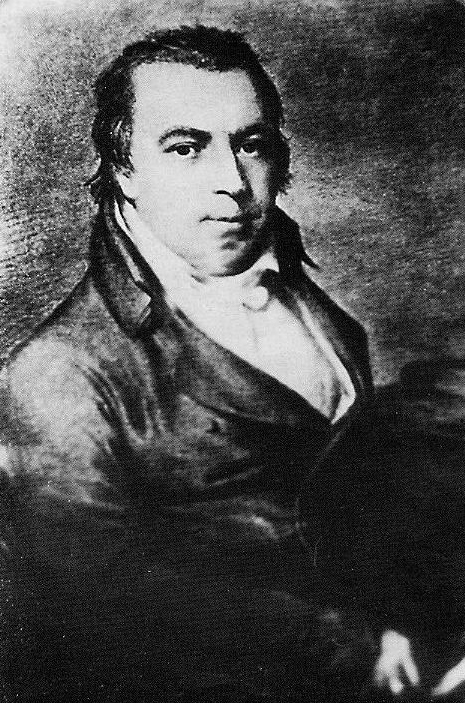
- Born: Ernst Christoph Friedrich Knorre; 11 December 1759; Neuhaldensleben, Holy Roman Empire
- Died: 1 December 1810 (aged 50); Dorpat, Russian Empire
- Education: University of Halle
- Organizations: Universität Dorpat; Dorpat Observatory
- Known for: Charting geography of Estonia
- Children: Karl Friedrich Knorre

Ernst Christoph Friedrich Knorre (11 December 1759 – 1 December 1810) was a German-born astronomer who lived and worked in present-day Estonia as a founding professor of mathematics at the Universität Dorpat and chief observator for the Dorpat Observatory. His son Karl Friedrich Knorre and grandson Viktor Knorre were also notable astronomers. Recently NASA named an asteroid in honor of the three generations of Knorre astronomers.

== Life and work ==
Knorre was born at Neuhaldensleben, near Magdeburg, in the German Empire. As a young man, he left home with his elder brother Johann to study theology at the University of Halle, where the two also secured positions as private tutors. In 1786, Johann was offered a position as the director of a new secondary school for girls in Dorpat and soon after, he left for the province of Livonia in present-day Estonia. Knorre joined him a short time later, and eventually took over as headmaster of the school in 1780 when Johann left Dorpat for Narva.

At the age of 35, Knorre, who always had a strong interest in science and mathematics, began to explore astronomy. At that time, the city of Dorpat had no university, and Knorre had little support in his scholastic pursuits, but he nevertheless undertook a daily record of his work, making regular entries about his celestial observations in his journal as early as 1795. That same year, he began to design and construct his own astronomical instrument, and set out to determine the geographical latitude of the city of Dorpat. With the help of little more than a plumb-line and bob, he fixed four plates with a series of round holes atop the wall of the two-story home where he lived. With a mirror placed under the lowest opening, Knorre observed the stars, seeking the one with a declination of between 58° and 59° to pass along the diameter of the uppermost opening. He recorded the star as Ursa Minor, though it is uncertain whether it was in fact that star. In spite of the primitive nature of his equipment, upon completing his calculations, Knorre became the first to determine the latitude of the observatory.

With Knorre's measured success in astronomy came an ever-increasing sense of influence among Dorpat's scientific community, and as his affiliations grew, so too did his recognition among political circles. After the re-establishment of the Universität Dorpat by Alexander I of Russia in 1802, Knorre received his first appointment as associate professorship there in mathematics. In 1803, construction began on the Dorpat Observatory, and Knorre was then named chief observator, a position that he held until his death on December 1, 1810.

Knorre's sudden death at the age of 51 left his wife Sophie (née Senff) and their three sons completely destitute. They sought shelter with Sophie's brother, himself a widower, Karl August Senff, who taught painting at the Fine Arts Department in the university. His son Karl was not yet 10 years old when his father died, but he already displayed an impressive amount of self-reliance and a staunch determination to carry on his father's work, in spite of his uncle and guardian's protests. As a young teen, Karl gave private lessons in mathematics and Latin to other pupils at his secondary school, and even to many adults, not only earning enough money to pay for his own education, but also securing his own place at the university at the age of 15. Both Karl and his son, Viktor Knorre, would go on to become notable astronomers in Russia and Germany respectively.
