= Jacqueline Knörr =

German anthropologist

Jacqueline Knörr (born 10 March 1960 in Düsseldorf, Germany) is a German anthropologist. She is Head of Research Group at the Max Planck Institute for Social Anthropology and Extraordinary Professor at the Martin Luther University in Halle/Saale, Germany. She also works as (political) advisor, consultant, and expert witness in the fields of asylum procedures, human rights issues and (re-)migration and (re-)integration.

== Education and degrees ==
Knörr attended school in Ghana and Germany. She studied Social Anthropology, Political Sciences, Development Studies and English Philology at the Universities of Hamburg, Irvine/UCI, Cologne (M.A.) and Bayreuth (PhD) and obtained a Habilitation degree at the Martin Luther University Halle-Wittenberg.

== Research interests ==
Knörr's research focuses on collective identifications, identity politics, inclusion and exclusion, ethnic and national identification, postcolonial nation-building, decolonization, diaspora and migration, creolization and pidginization, childhood and youth, gender and generation. She has conducted long-term fieldwork in West Africa, Indonesia and (German and Dutch-speaking) Europe.

== Grants ==
Knörr received research grants from the German Research Foundation (Deutsche Forschungsgemeinschaft/DFG) as doctoral and postdoctoral member of DFG Research Schools (Graduiertenkolleg/Sonderforschungsbereich) at the University of Bayreuth (Centre: Intercultural Relations in Africa) and the University of Münster (Centre: Conflicts in the Context of Social and Cultural Diversity). She was awarded the Lise Meitner Habilitation Grant of the Ministry of Science and Research (NRW) and the five-year Minerva Professorship of the Max Planck Society.

== Joint research projects ==
Knörr was the MPI for Social Anthropology's Principal Investigator in the research project on ‘Integration and Conflict in Atlantic and Indian Ocean Societies’, conducted in collaboration with the Institute for Social Sciences (ICS) in Lisbon and in the Sierra Leone and Liberia section of the project ‘Traveling Models in Conflict Management’, funded by the Volkswagen Foundation. Her current involvement in joint research projects includes membership in the executive board of the ‘Society and Culture in Motion’ programme at the Martin Luther University Halle-Wittenberg.

== Visiting professor-/fellowships ==
Knörr was Visiting Professor at the École normale supérieure (Paris) (2022), McGill University in Montreal (2008–09), the University of Brasilia (2007, 2016), the University of Bayreuth (2008–09), Indiana University Bloomington (2006), and the Institute for Social Sciences in Lisbon (2006). She was Visiting Fellow/Researcher at the University of Indonesia in Jakarta (2001) and at Fourah Bay College in Freetown, Sierra Leone.

== Leadership roles and committee work in scientific/academic organizations ==
- Scientific Representative, Max Planck Society (2012-2015, 2018-2020)
- Mentor, Minerva FemmeNet, Max Planck Society (since 2009)
- Head of the Project Development Group, MPI for Social Anthropology, (2005–07)
- Board member of the German Society for Social and Cultural Anthropology (formerly German Anthropological Association / DGV) (2003–07)
- Chairwoman of the section ‘Migration, Multiculturality and Identity’ and Associate Board Member of the German Society for Social and Cultural Anthropology (1995-2003)

== Membership in political organizations ==
- Flüchtlingsrat Nordrhein-Westfalen (Refugee Council North Rhine-Westphalia)
- Netzwerk Migration in Europa (Network Migration in Europe)
- Pro Asyl
- International Refugee Rights Initiative, Rights in Exile Programme
- Advisory Board on Migration Policies, Social Democratic Party (SPD), Berlin (00-03)

== Publications ==
=== Books ===
- Creolization and Pidginization in Contexts of Postcolonial Diversity: Language, Culture, Identity (co-edited with W. Trajano Filho). Leiden: Brill, 2018.
- Politics and Policies in Contemporary Upper Guinea Coast Societies: Change and Continuity (co-edited with C. K. Højbjerg and W. P. Murphy). New York: Palgrave Macmillan, 2017.
- The Upper Guinea Coast in Global Perspective (co-edited with C. Kohl). Oxford and New York: Berghahn Books, 2016 (Open Access)
- Creole Identity in Postcolonial Indonesia. Oxford and New York: Berghahn Books, 2014 (hardcover), 2018 (paperback).
- The Powerful Presence of the Past: Integration and Conflict along the Upper Guinea Coast (co-edited with Wilson Trajano Filho). Leiden: Brill, 2010.
- Kreolität und postkoloniale Gesellschaft. Integration und Differenzierung in Jakarta. Frankfurt/M. and New York: Campus Verlag, 2007.
- Childhood and Migration. From Experience to Agency (editor). Bielefeld and Somerset, N.J.: Transcript and Transaction Publishers, 2005.
- Women and Migration: Anthropological Perspectives. (co-edited with B. Meier). Frankfurt/M. and New York: Campus Verlag and St. Martin's Press, 2000.

== Articles ==
- Global and local models of governance in interaction: configurations of power in Upper Guinea Coast societies (with Anita Schroven). Journal for Contemporary African Studies 37,1: 57-71 (online).
- Creolization and pidginization as identity-related concepts of language, culture and identity. In: Knörr, J. and W. Trajano Filho (eds.) Creolization and Pidginization in Contexts of Postcolonial Diversity: Language, Culture, Identity, pp. 15–35. Leiden: Brill, 2018.
- Creolization and pidginization in contexts of postcolonial diversity: content, context, structure (with W. Trajano Filho). In: Knörr, J. and W. Trajano Filho (eds.) Creolization and Pidginization in Contexts of Postcolonial Diversity: Language, Culture, Identity, pp. 3–14. Leiden: Brill, 2018.
- A war and after: Sierra Leone reconnects, within itself and with the world. In: Hannerz, U. and A. Gingrich (eds.) Small Countries: Structures and Sensibilities, pp. 250–264. Philadelphia: University of Pennsylvania Press, 2017.
- Female Genital Cutting in context: The example of Sierra Leone. The Expert Witness 16, 2016: 36-42 (online).
- Einheit in Vielfalt? Zum Verhältnis ethnischer und nationaler Identität in Indonesien. Aus Politik und Zeitgeschichte (APuZ) 11–12, 2012: 16-23 (online ).
- Das Coming-out der Diaspora als Heimat? Kreolische Identität in Sierra Leones Nachkriegsgesellschaft. Zeitschrift für Ethnologie 136, 2011: 331–356.
- Contemporary creoleness, or: The world in pidginization? Current Anthropology 51, 6, 2010: 731–759.
- Creolization and nation-building in Indonesia. In: Cohen, R. and P. Tonninato (eds.) (2009) The Creolization Reader. Studies in Mixed Identities and Cultures, pp. 353–363. London: Routledge.
- ‘Free the Dragon’ versus ‘Becoming Betawi’. Chinese identity in contemporary Jakarta. Asian Ethnicity 10, 1, 2009: 71–90.
- Postkoloniale Kreolität versus koloniale Kreolisierung. Paideuma 55, 2009: 93-115.
- Indigenisierung vs. Re-Ethnisierung. Chinesische Identität in Jakarta. Anthropos 1, 2008: 159–177.
- Im Spannungsfeld von Traditionalität und Modernität: Die Orang Betawi und Betawi-ness in Jakarta, Zeitschrift für Ethnologie 128, 2002, 2: 203–221.
