= Emely Knorr =

German politician (born 1986)

Member of the Landtag of Baden-Württemberg
- Incumbent
- Assumed office 11 May 2026

Personal details
- Born: 1986 (age 39–40)
- Party: Alternative for Germany (since 2020)

Emely Knorr (born 1986) is a German politician who was elected member of the Landtag of Baden-Württemberg in 2026. She previously worked as a legislative assistant in the Landtag and Bundestag.
