= 271 Penthesilea =

Main-belt asteroid

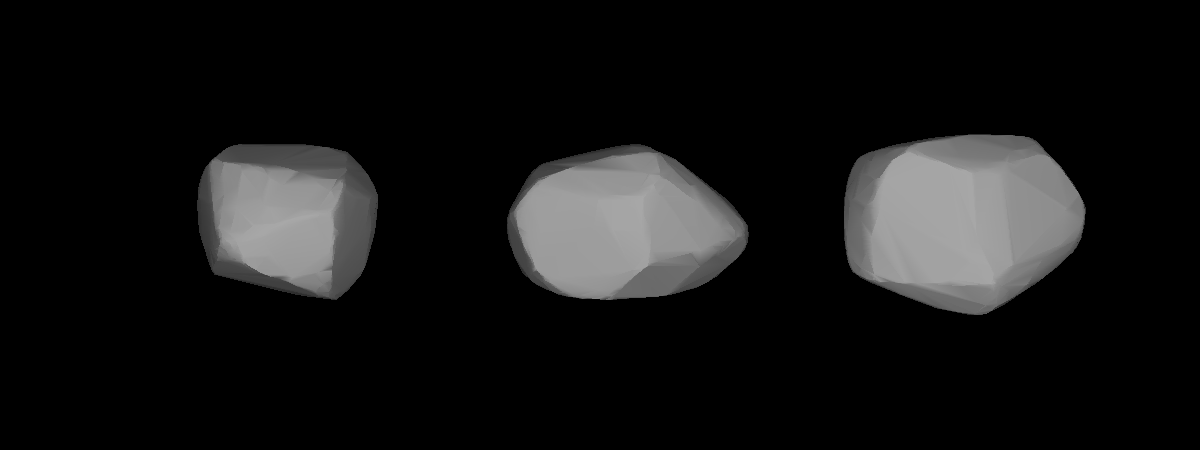
- Lightcurve-based 3D model of 271 Penthesilea

Discovery
- Discovered by: Viktor Knorre
- Discovery date: 13 October 1887

Designations
- Pronunciation: /ˌpɛnθɪsɪˈliːə/
- Named after: Πενθεσίλεια
- Alternative designations: A887 TB, 1916 GG; 1916 HA
- Minor planet category: Main belt

Orbital characteristics
- Epoch 31 July 2016 (JD 2457600.5)
- Uncertainty parameter 0
- Observation arc: 112.35 yr (41037 d)
- Aphelion: 3.3147 AU (495.87 Gm)
- Perihelion: 2.69235 AU (402.770 Gm)
- Semi-major axis: 3.0035 AU (449.32 Gm)
- Eccentricity: 0.10361
- Orbital period (sidereal): 5.21 yr (1901.3 d)
- Mean anomaly: 243.905°
- Mean motion: 0° 11^{m} 21.624^{s} / day
- Inclination: 3.5395°
- Longitude of ascending node: 335.367°
- Argument of perihelion: 58.345°

Physical characteristics
- Dimensions: 57.93±3.3 km
- Synodic rotation period: 18.787 h (0.7828 d)
- Geometric albedo: 0.0633±0.008
- Absolute magnitude (H): 9.80

271 Penthesilea is a mid-sized main belt asteroid that was discovered by Viktor Knorre on 13 October 1887 in Berlin. It was his last asteroid discovery. The asteroid was named after Penthesilea, the mythical Greek queen of the Amazons.

Photometric observations of this asteroid were made in early 2009 at the Organ Mesa Observatory in Las Cruces, New Mexico. The resulting light curve shows a synodic rotation period of 18.787 ± 0.001 hours with a brightness variation of 0.32 ± 0.04 in magnitude.
