= Mykolaiv Observatory =

Mykolaiv Astronomical Observatory
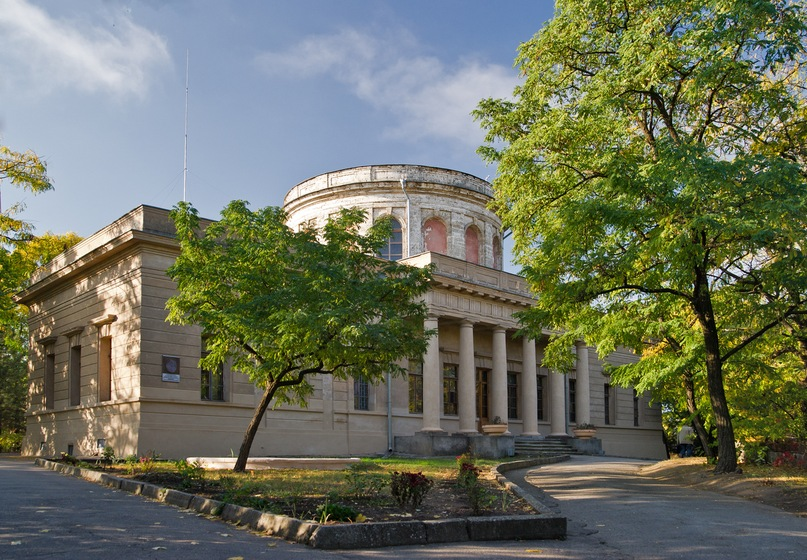
- Modern view of the observatory
- Alternative names: Research Institute “Nikolaev Astronomical Observatory”
- Observatory code: 089
- Location: Mykolaiv, Ukraine
- Coordinates: 46°58′22″N 31°58′22″E
- Altitude: 52 m (171 ft)
- Established: 1821
- Website: mao.mk.ua

Telescopes
- AMC: Axial Meridian Circle (CCD detector)
- FRT: Fast Robotic Telescope
- MCT: Multi-Channel Telescope (CCD detector)
- Mobitel: mobile robotic multi-channel telescope
- Related media on Commons

Immovable Monument of National Significance of Ukraine
- Official name: Обсерваторія (Observatory)
- Type: Architecture
- Reference no.: 140033

Mykolaiv Observatory (full name: Research Institute "Mykolaiv Astronomical Observatory", Ukrainian: Науково-дослідницький інститут «Миколаївська астрономічна обсерваторія») is an astronomical observatory in Mykolaiv, Ukraine.

== History ==
=== Naval Observatory (1821–1912) ===
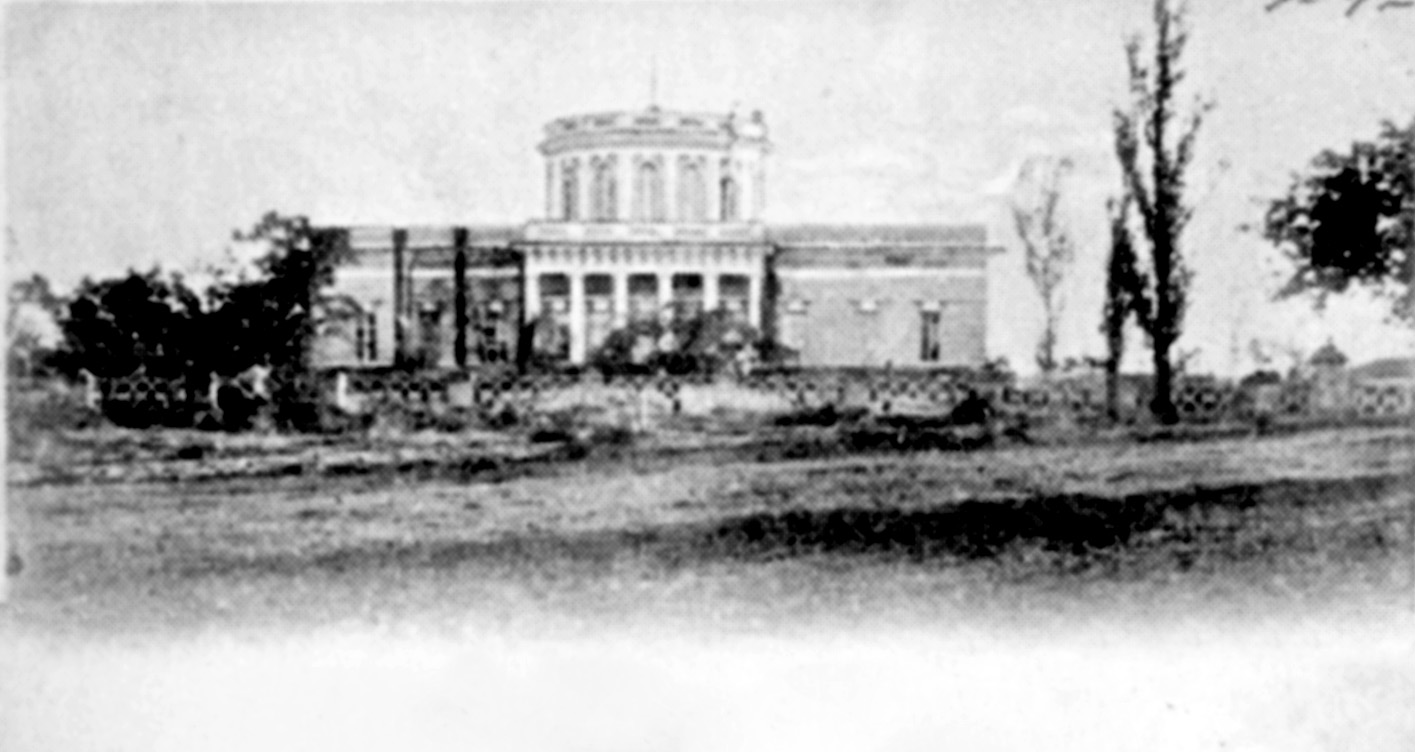
The observatory in the late 19th century

Mykolaiv Astronomical Observatory was founded in 1821 by Admiral Aleksey Samuilovich Greig (1775–1845) as a Naval Observatory to ensure the Black Sea Fleet with time, nautical charts and teaching naval officers to utilize astronomical methods of orientation. The top of the Spasky hill, Mykolaiv city's, highest hill (52M), was chosen as the construction site for the observatory. The designer of the main building project was Fyodor Ivanovich Wunsch (1770–1836), who was also the main architect of the Black Sea Admiralty. Karl Frederick Knorre was appointed to the position of first director on the recommendation of Vasiliy Yakovlevich Struve (1801–1883). In addition to his work in the preparation of naval officers, K. Knorre began the scientific astronomical research. In the history of astronomy he is known as the author of the Berlin Academy of Science's 5th sheet of the star map, by the help of which the minor planets Astrea and Flora were discovered. K. Knorre held the position of director of the Observatory for 50 years. The second director Ivan Y. Kortatstsi (1837–1903) continued the astronomical research at the Observatory, cataloging the position of stars later named the “Nikolaev Zone”. In the marine period of the observatory, K.H. Knorre and I.E. Kortatstsi carried out hydrographic survey works on the Azov, Black and Marmara Seas. They conducted an inventory of, and more precise identification of geographical coordinates of many control points on these sea maps. The fleet was equipped with precision instruments and perfected methods of determining the time (longitude) and latitude.

=== Mykolaiv department of Pulkovo Observatory (1912–1991) ===
Until [1911] the Observatory belonged to the Navy Ministry, and from 1912 to 1991 MAO became the southern branch of the Pulkovo Observatory. The main objective of the Observatory at that time was the spread of the Pulkovo absolute star catalogs to the southern sky and the implementation of regular observations of the Sun and Solar system bodies. To equip the new department the Repsold Vertical Circle and the passage instrument (Freiberg-Kondratiev) were moved from Odessa. The Observatory managed to survive and was preserved as a scientific institution during a period of great distress in our society: the First World War, the Revolution and then Civil War. Boris Pavlovich Ostaschenko-Kudryavtsev (1879–1956) was the director at that times. The Renaissance of the Observatory after the ordeal is associated with the name of the fourth director Leonid Ivanovich Semenov (1878–1965), who headed the Observatory in [1923]. In [1931], the highly accurate Time Service was created by MAO, which contributed to national and international programs to determine the exact time. In 1935 the observatory was included in the system of institutions of the Academy of Sciences of the USSR as a branch of the Pulkovo. During the Great Patriotic War from August 1941 to March 1944 the observatory was occupied by the Germans. Director L.I. Semenov managed to keep it from serious injury and destruction.

In the postwar period Jakov E. Gordon (1912–1978) was appointed to the post of director of the observatory (in 1951). In [1955], Repsold Meridian Circle was transported to Mykolaiv from Pulkovo after reconstruction and a number of upgrades, on which different observational programs were carried out during 40 years. In 1961, Zonal Astrograph made by the “Carl Zeiss” firm was transferred from Pulkovo to MAO and the history of photographic astrometry has begun. Mykolaiv photographic observations of Solar system bodies are among some of the most accurate in the World. In 1957-1969 visual and photographic observation satellites were carried out to determine their orbits. In 70 – 80s, the observatory was the initiator and main administrant of several scientific expeditions for observations upon conditions of Polar night and high mountains in the Caucasus on the West Spitsbergen island. In total, nearly 35 different catalogs were created by MAO with the positions of celestial bodies. In 1978 Rima Timofeevna Fedorova (1934 born) became director of the observatory. Gennady Pinigin (current director, 1943 born) took up the position of director in 1986.

=== Mykolaiv Astronomical Observatory ===
In 1992, Mykolaiv Astronomical Observatory gained the status of an independent scientific institution, and in 2002 received official status as a Research Institute. Maintaining its scientific traditions, MAO has expanded the research topics in the area of astronomical instrumentation and research of Near-Earth Space. In 1995, the MAO created and brought into action an automatic telescope with a CCD detector - Axial Meridian Circle (AMC), which in 1999 was included in the Tentative list of objects that make up the national property of Ukraine. After upgrade and an equipping the Zonal astrograph with CCD detector, it was renamed to the Multi-Channel Telescope (MCT). In 2004 Fast Robotic Telescope (FRT) was put into service. The regular observations of near space objects are conducted on FTR, within the framework of participation in the National Space Program of Ukraine's monitoring and analysis of Space conditions. In 2009, the first Ukrainian mobile telescope "Mobitel" was created. It consists of four independent mount equipped with modern CCD cameras with control system program in the remote access mode. Currently work on the creation of Mykolaiv Virtual Observatory as part of Ukrainian National Virtual Observatory is being conducted.

== Research fields ==
Solar system dynamics:

- CCD-observations of selected asteroids with the aim to improve their orbits and mass determination;
- CCD-observations of near-Earth asteroids;
- photometric observations of the minor planets and satellites of the big planets.

Stellar reference frames:

- extension of the Hipparcos catalogue to the faint stars;
- research on the link between radio and optical reference frames;
- compilation of star catalogues in the selected fields of celestial sphere such as fields around extragalactic radio sources and individual objects, calibration regions.

Near-Earth space:

- improvement of method for observations of near-Earth objects;
- observations of geostationary satellites with the aim to improve their orbit elements and to compile their catalogue;
- monitoring of the ionosphere with the aim of seismic forecast and study of the Sun-Earth connections;
- GPS observations.

Information Support of Astronomical Research:

- development of software for observations and data processing;
- development of the system for remote access to telescopes via a local network and the Internet;
- development of databases as part of virtual observatory.

History of Astronomy:

- contribution of MAO to astrometrical research;
- elucidation of activities and contribution of selected astronomers of MAO to various branches of astrometry;
- a historical study of expeditions.

== Preservation ==
The observatory is listed as a protected building since 1963. It is inscribed in UNESCO tentative World Heritage list since 2007 as an individual object, and since 2008 together with other prominent observatories of Ukraine.

== Staff of the observatory ==
- A. V. Shulga, the director of Mykolaiv Astronomical Observatory;
- Y. I. Protsyuk, vice director on science.
