= Vanaspati =

Sanskrit word

Vanaspati (Devanagari: वनस्पति) is the Sanskrit word that now refers to the entire plant kingdom. However, according to Charaka Samhitā and Sushruta Samhita medical texts and the Vaisesikas school of philosophy, "vanaspati" is limited to plants that bear fruits but no evident flowers. In the Rigveda, 9th Mandala, Hymn 5.10, "Vanaspati" (literally meaning: Lord of the Forest) is a deity presiding over the forest and described as the "ever-green, the golden-hued, refulgent, with a thousand boughs."

== Concept in Hindu scriptures ==
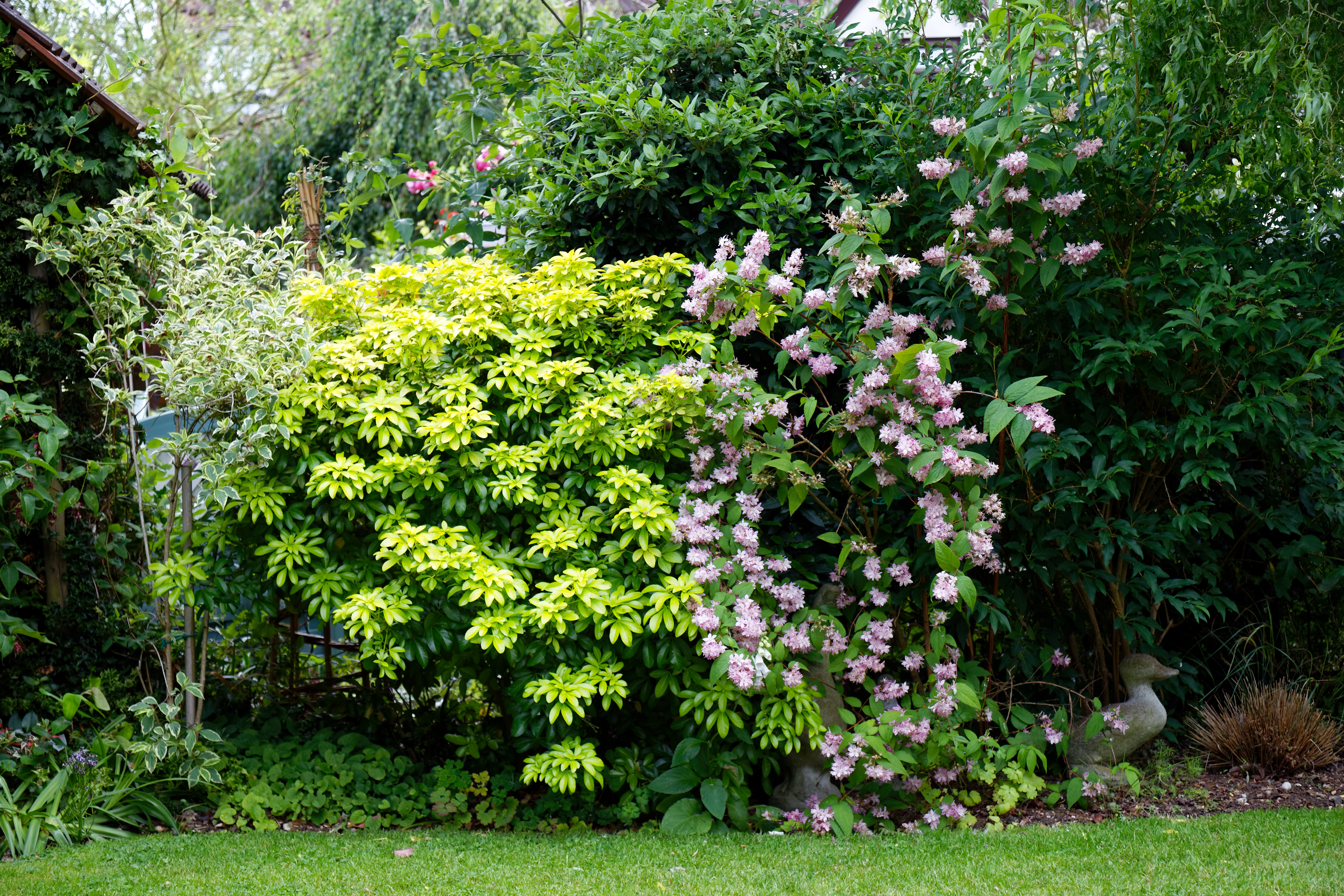
Visakha i.e. shrubs in Sanskrit.

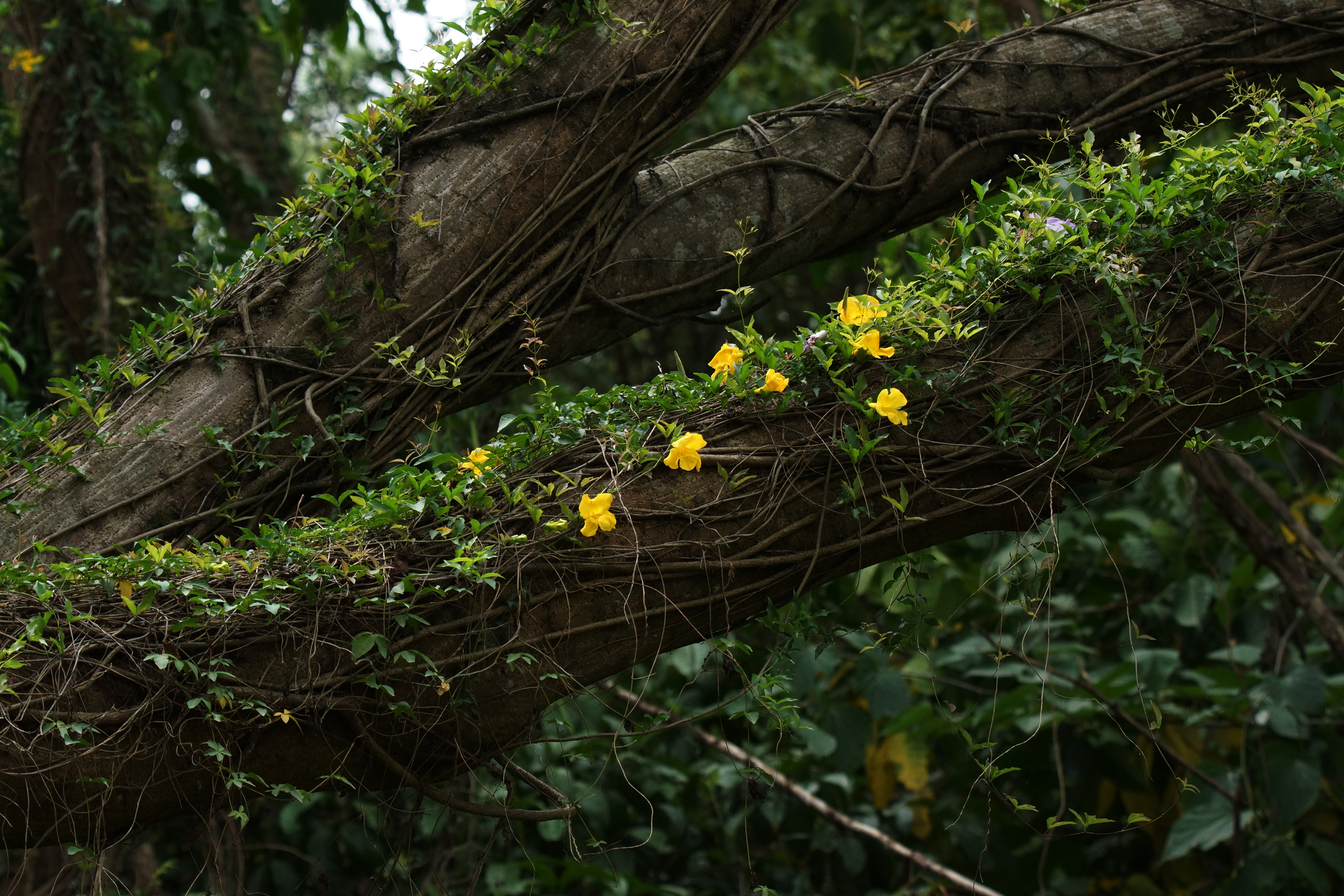
Pratanavati i.e. Creepers in Sanskrit

The Rigveda divides plants into Vrksha (tree), Oshadhi (herbs useful to humans) and Virudha (creepers). These are subdivided into:

- Visakha (shrubs),
- Sasa (herbs),
- Vratati (climbers),
- Pratanavati (creepers) and
- Alasala (spreading on the ground).

All grasses are separately classified as Trna, flowering plants are Puspavati, and the fruit bearing ones are Phalavati. Leafless plants are placed under the group, Karira.

Other veda, the Atharvaveda divides plants into eight classes:

- (1) Visakha (spreading branches);
- (2) Manjari (leaves with long clusters);
- (3) Sthambini (bushy plants);
- (4) Prastanavati (which expands);
- (5) Ekasrnga (those with monopodial growth);
- (6) Pratanavati (creeping plants);
- (7) Amsumati (with many stalks); and
- (8) Kandini (plants with knotty joints).

The Taittiriya Samhita and the Vajasenayi Samhita texts the plant kingdom is classified into:

- vrksa, vana and druma (trees),
- visakha (shrubs with spreading branches),
- sasa (a herb),
- amsumali (a spreading or deliquescent plant),
- vratati (a climber),
- stambini (a bushy plant),
- pratanavati (a creeper), and
- alasala (those spreading on the ground).

In the words of Brahma, the Manu classifies plants as

- (1) Osadhi – plants bearing abundant flowers and fruits, but withering away after fructification,
- (2) Vanaspati – plants bearing fruits without evident flowers,
- (3) Vrksa – trees bearing both flowers and fruits,
- (4) Guccha – bushy herbs,
- (5) Gulma – succulent shrubs,
- (6) Trna – grasses,
- (7) Pratana – creepers which spread their stems on the ground and
- (8) Valli – climbers and entwiners.

Charaka Samhitā and Sushruta Samhita medicine texts classify plants into Vanaspati, Vrksa or vanaspatya, Virudh and Osadhi. This second Susruta subdivides Virudhs into pratanavatya (creepers with spreading stem on the grounds) and gulminya (succulent herbs), whereas the first Charaka subdivides Virudhs into lata (creeper), gulma and osadhis into annuals or perennials bearing fruits and grasses which go without fruits. These are further divided into 50 groups based on their physiological actions and diseases they cure. Flowering plants are divided into sukadhanya (cereals), samidhanya (pulses), saka varga (pot herbs), phala varga (fruits), harita varga (vegetable), ahayogi varga (oils), and iksu varga (sugarcane).

The Vaisesikas school of philosophy classify plants under seven heads, e.g. Vrksa, Trna, Osadhi, Gulma, Lata, Avatana and Vanaspati. Defining the characteristics of the various groups Udayana's Kiranavali, remarks that:

- Vrksas are plants with trunk, branches, flowers and fruits;
- Trnas are exemplified by ulupa like plant;
- Osadhis are plants like kaluma. which die after fruition;
- Gulmas are plant like bhata,
- Latas are represented by kusmanda, a species of Cucurbita;
- Avatanas are plants like ketaki;i and
- Vanaspatis are trees which produce fruits without flowers.

Parasara, the author of Vrksayurveda, classifies plants into Dvimatrka (Dicotyledons) and Ekamatrka (Monocotyledons). These are further classified into:

- Samiganiya (Fabaceae) - With hypogynous (puspakrantabijadhara) and five-petalled flowers, with gamosepalous calyx and an androecium of 10 stamens. This family has three subtypes: vakra-puspa, vikarnika-puspa and suka-puspa.
- Puplikagalniya (Rutaceae) - Spine bearing plants with odoriferous leaves and winged petioles, flowers are hypogynous (tundamandala) with free petals and stamens. Family has two subtypes: kesaraka and maluraphala.
- Svastikaganiya (Cruciferae) – Calyx looks like a svastika. The flower has four sepals, four petals and six stamens, and a superior ovary (tundamandala).
- Tripuspaganiya (Cucurbitaceae) – Epigynous (kumbhamandala), often unisexual plant. The flower has five united sepals and petals and three stamens and a style with three-pointed stigma (trisirsavarata). The ovary is tri-vartaka (tri-locular).
- Mallikaganiya (Apocynaceae) – Inflorescent, hermaphrodite (samanga) plants, calyx and corolla are united having five stamens, epipetalous (avyoktakesara). The seeds having long fine hairs (tulapucchasamanvita).
- Kurcapuspaganiya (Compositeae) – Sessile flowers, borne on a common axis, surrounded by a common calyx and look like a brushy head (kurcakara). The ovary is inferior (puspasirsakabijadhara).

== Hydrogenated vegetable oil ==
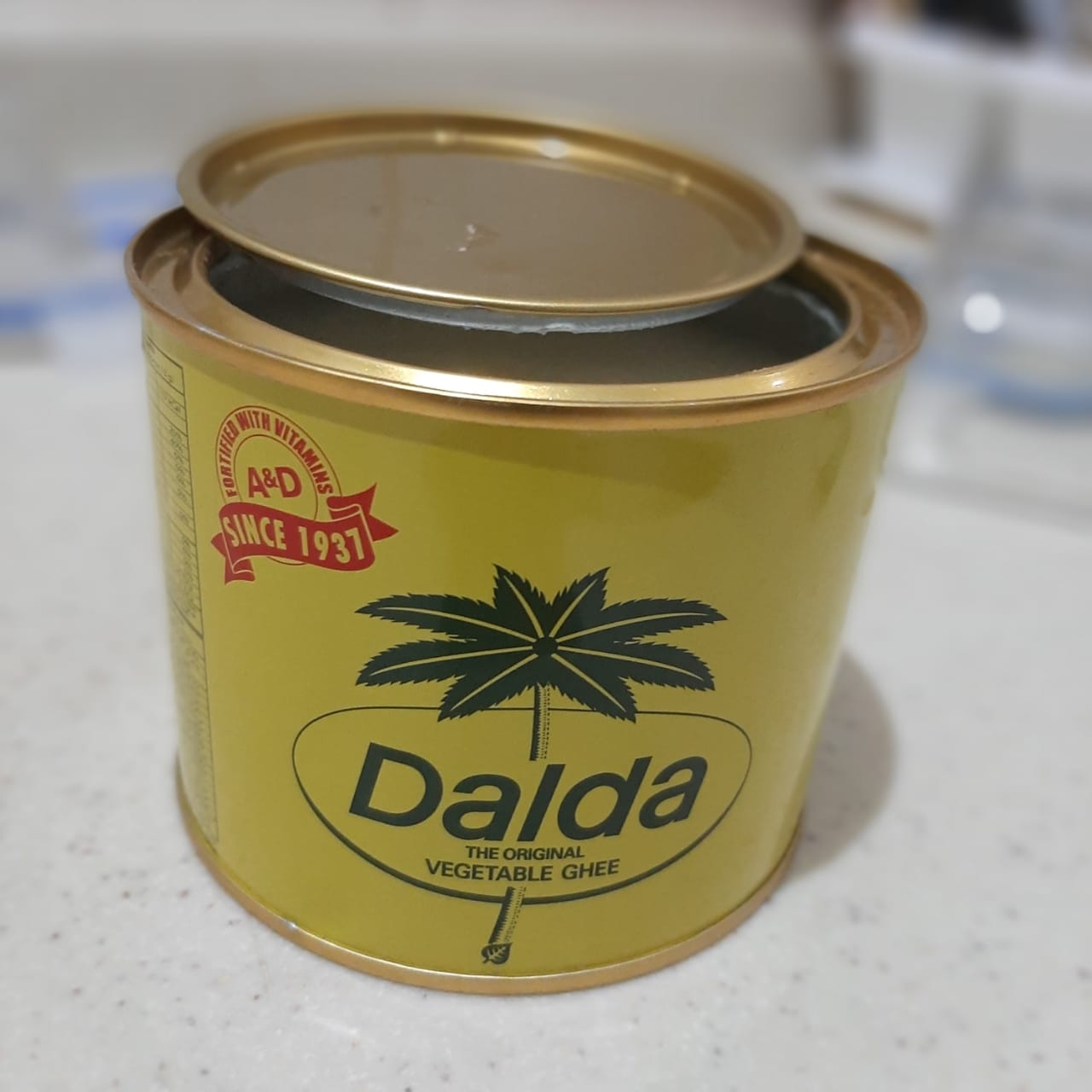
Dalda "Vegetable ghee", one of the first vanaspati brands in India.

Vanaspati Ghee (or just Vanaspati/Banaspati) is a fully or partially hydrogenated vegetable fat/oil used for cooking. It is a hardened shortening which remains solid or semi-solid at room temperature, and is specifically designed to imitate the coarsely crystalline plastic texture of natural ghee. It is primarily used as a cheaper everyday substitute for the much costlier (desi-) ghee and butter in South Asia.

Vanaspati ghee is usually made from palm oil. The hydrogenation is performed using a supported nickel catalyst in reactors at low-medium pressure (3-10 bar). It has come under health criticism since it is very high in trans fats, which may compose up to 50% of vanaspati.
