= Nivea =

German brand of skin care products

- Logo used since 2021, a mix of 1934 and 2011
- Product type: Skin and body care
- Current owner: Beiersdorf AG
- Country: Germany
- Introduced: 1911; 115 years ago (as Nivea)
- Related brands: Eucerin; Aquaphor; Labello; Coppertone
- Markets: Worldwide
- Website: nivea.com

Nivea (German pronunciation: [niˈveːa], stylized as NIVEA) is a German personal care brand that specializes in skin and body care. It is owned by the Hamburg-based company Beiersdorf Global AG, who also makes the Eucerin brand. Nivea comes from the Latin adjective niveus meaning "snow-white".

In the 1930s, Beiersdorf produced various products such as tanning oil, shaving cream, shampoo, facial cleanser, and toners. During World War II, the trademark "NIVEA" was expropriated in many countries. After the war, Beiersdorf repurchased the rights. During the 1980s, the NIVEA brand expanded into a wider market.

== History ==
Paul Beiersdorf established Beiersdorf AG on 28 March 1882. Beiersdorf collaborated with dermatologist Paul Gerson Unna to produce gutta-percha plasters in his laboratory based on his patent, laying the foundations for modern plaster technology. In 1890, pharmacist Oscar Troplowitz took over the company and collaborated with Unna, who recommended Isaac Lifschütz, inventor of the lanolin-based emulsifier Eucerit, which was patented in 1900. Nivea soap was released in 1906, and in 1911, its signature creme was introduced.

=== Early years ===
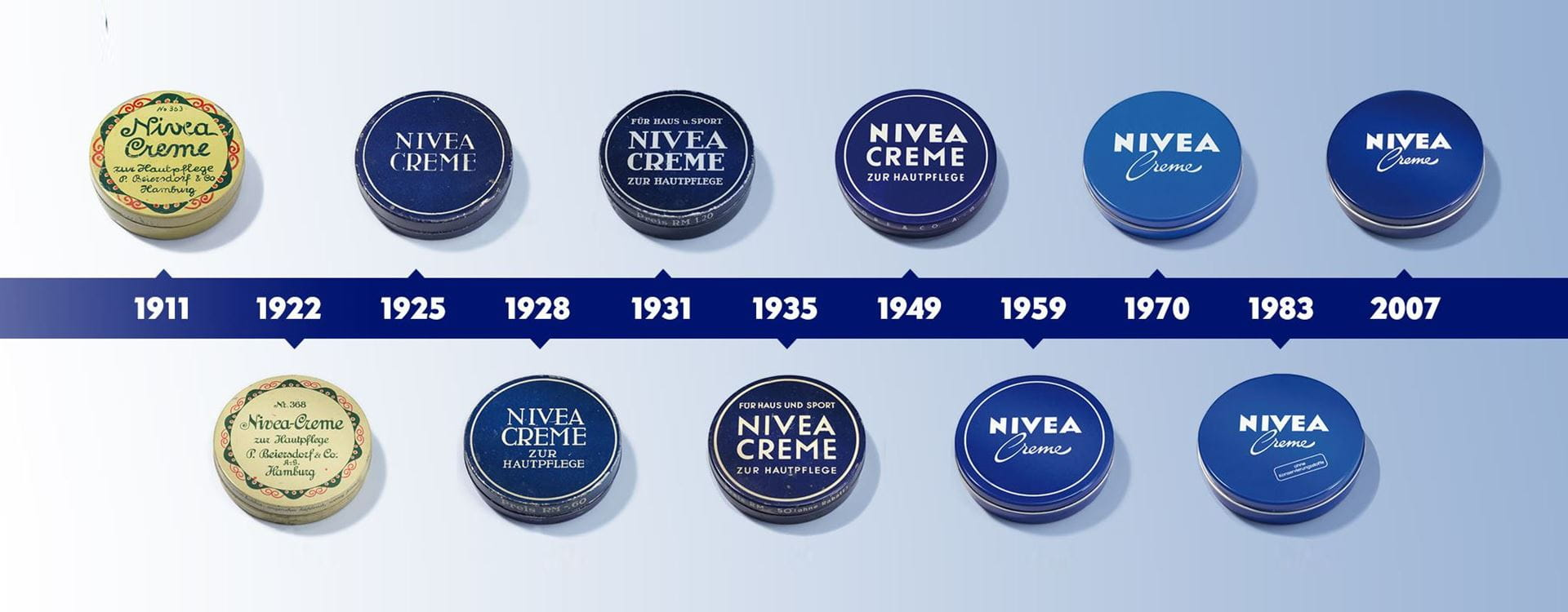
NIVEA tins from 1911 to 2007

In 1900, a patent application was submitted for Lanolin, an emulsifying agent. Eucerit was the basis for Eucerin and, later on, for NIVEA Creme. The first overseas branch was established in London six years later. In 1909, Labello was launched on the market. It was the first lip care product in sliding tube packaging. "Labello" is derived from the Latin for "lip" (labium) and "beautiful" (bellum). Eventually, two years later, NIVEA Creme – the first stable water-in-oil emulsion – was introduced. The emulsifying agent Eucerit is made from lanolin, found in sheep's wool, and is the key to NIVEA Creme's unique properties. The deaths of entrepreneurs Oscar Troplowitz and his partner Otto Hanns Mankiewicz resulted in the formation of a formal company on 1 June 1922.

Willy Jacobsohn took over as chairman of the executive board of the newly formed stock corporation. The first self-adhesive plaster was introduced under the name Hansaplast. In 1925, NIVEA was relaunched in a new packaging: a blue tin with a white logo, which is recognizable even today. Beiersdorf shares were listed on the Hamburg stock exchange for the first time in 1928. Over 20 production sites worldwide were already in operation.

=== Nazi-era Germany and aftermath ===
Under pressure of Nazi propaganda, Jewish members of the executive board stepped down in 1933. Willy Jacobsohn, the former chairman of the executive board, headed the foreign affiliates from Amsterdam until 1938. By adopting a policy of "honorable tactics", the Beiersdorf Executive Board, under the leadership of Carl Claussen, steered the company through the Nazi period. Although Beiersdorf retained its business culture, it cooperated with the regime.

In 1936, tesafilm, an innovative transparent adhesive film, was launched. Tesa was introduced as the umbrella brand for self-adhesive technology. During World War II, marketing manager Elly Heuss-Knapp distanced the brand from Nazi ideology. In 1949, her husband Theodor Heuss became first President of Germany.

At the end of the Second World War, most of the Hamburg production plants and administrative buildings in Hamburg were destroyed during bombing in WW2. From 1945–1949, the Beiersdorf company lost most affiliates and international trademarks in almost all countries, particularly the US, the UK, the Commonwealth, and France. However, it began to regain its trademarks again.

=== Late 20th century ===
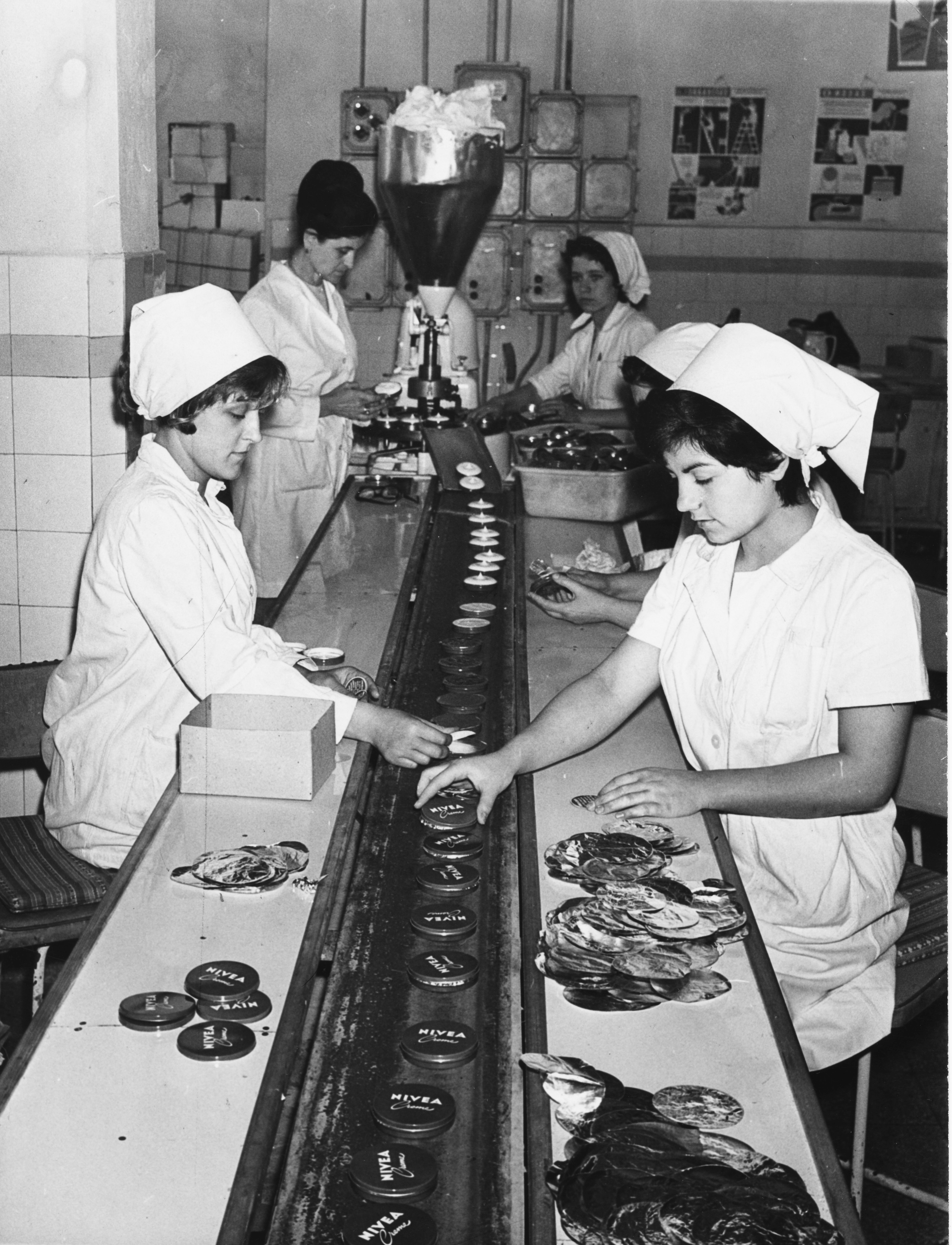
Nivea cream on a conveyor belt in 1970

In 1950, ph5 Eucerin was launched on the market. This ointment emphasized the importance of the skin's own natural protective acid barrier in maintaining good skin health. During the 1950s and 1960s, the brand was extended into a product family and the first deodorizing soap, 8x4, was introduced. NIVEA milk, liquid NIVEA Creme in a water-in-oil emulsion, was introduced "for all-over body care". Beiersdorf launched a protective hand cream called "atrix" on the market.

Beiersdorf diversified its business and introduced a divisional structure in the 1970s. Currently, the divisions are cosmed, medical, pharma, and tesa. The steady expansion of NIVEA as a skin and body care brand started through many sub-brands with an international focus—the introduction of NIVEA Gesicht (face) in Germany, Austria, and Switzerland.

The year 1989 brought a change of strategy. NIVEA began to implement a strategic re-orientation process focusing on the core competencies of skin care, wound care, and adhesive technology. In 1990s, they acquired the Juvena brand developed by the Divapharma pharmaceutical laboratory, the La Prairie brand from the famous La Prairie clinic in Montreux, and the Futuro brand founded by German Georg Jung in 1917. Before the turn of the 21st century, the company's strategy was further streamlined to focus on a few strong consumer brands. Professional wound care and self-adhesive technology were allowed to introduce organizational structures.

=== 21st century ===
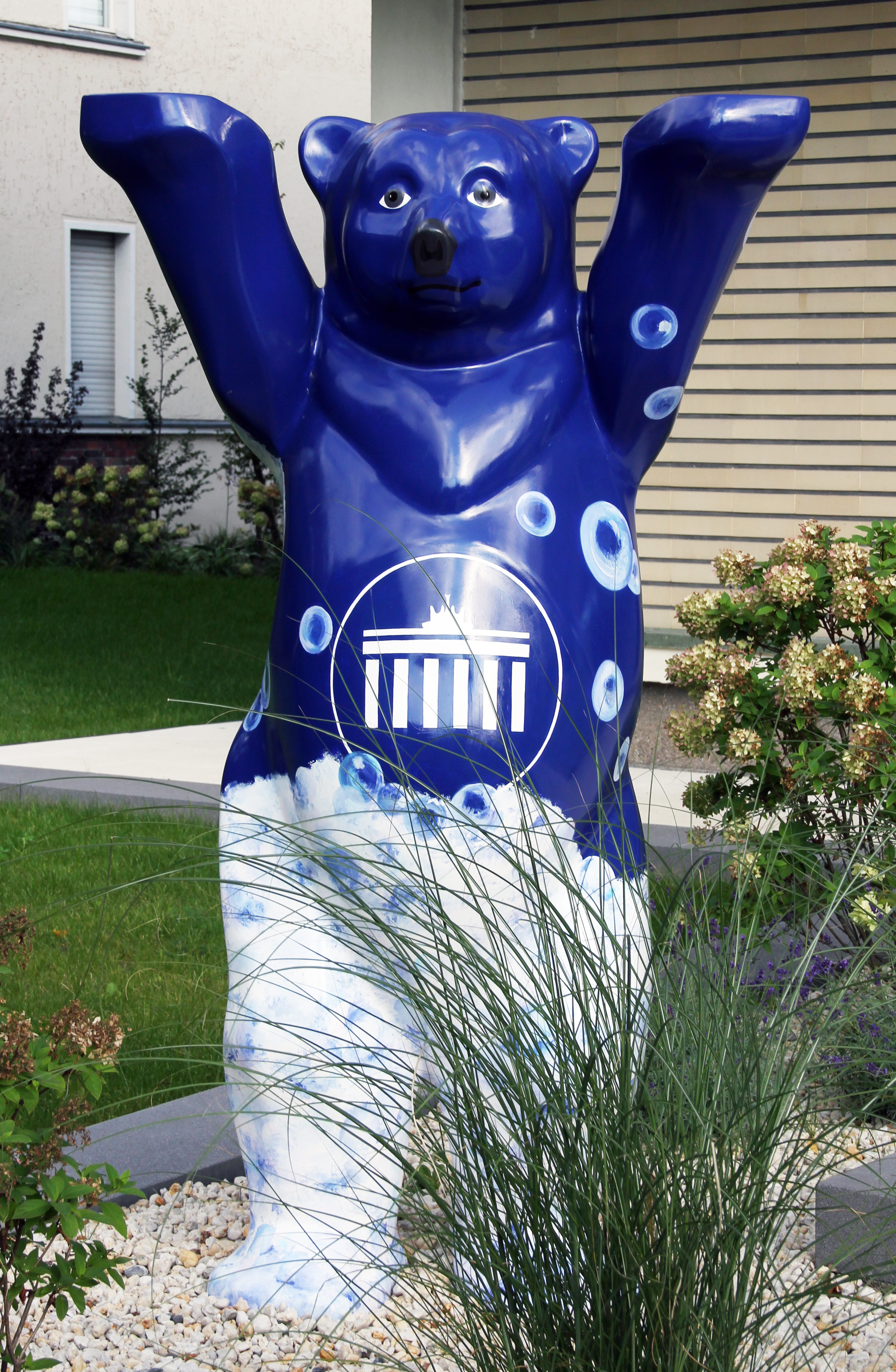
Nivea Bear, Franklinstrasse 1 in Charlottenburg

The new strategy enabled tesa to become an independent affiliate. Tesa AG was formed as a wholly owned affiliate of Beiersdorf, enabling it to react more flexibly to consumers and industrial customers. Professional wound care was spun off in line with the new strategy and contributed to a joint venture between Beiersdorf and Smith & Nephew. BSN Medical, domiciled in Hamburg, was founded.

In 2002, Florena became a wholly owned subsidiary of Beiersdorf. The cooperation dates back to 1989 and intensified following Germany's reunification.

NIVEA's previous divisional organization was replaced by a new functional group focusing on brands, supply chain management, finance, and human resources. The new skin research center opened in Hamburg, underscoring the innovative strength of the globally successful Beiersdorf group. NIVEA began sponsoring the Times Square New Year's Ball Drop on 31 December 2008, along with the Carson's Countdown on NBC New Year's Eve specials. NIVEA also launched its new product, NIVEA Happiness Sensation, featuring the song "Touch" by singer-songwriter Natasha Bedingfield in the commercial. In 2011, NIVEA celebrated its "100 Years of Skincare" through festivities featuring several performances by Barbadian singer and actress Rihanna. Rihanna's song "California King Bed" was featured as a part of the "100 Years of Skincare" commercial campaign.

== Controversies ==
In 2011, NIVEA was fined $900,000 by the US Federal Trade Commission for falsely claiming that consumers could slim down by regularly applying NIVEA My Silhouette! cream to their skin. The same year, NIVEA published a world map on its website that omitted Israel; Simon Wiesenthal Center protests.

In June 2019, the marketing and media industry journal Ad Age reported on 26 June 2019 that FCB, Nivea's long-time ad agency, had ended its relationship with the company. Among the primary reasons cited was NIVEA's rejection of a proposed ad that featured two men's hands touching because, according to a NIVEA executive, "we don't do gay at NIVEA." Crain's Chicago Business reported that FCB had ended the relationship of more than a century. Noting that the breakup occurred at the end of LGBT pride month, Crain's noted that FCB would be forgoing the management of NIVEA's $21.8 million US advertising budget. It represented 1% of FCB's revenue globally.

== Selected products ==
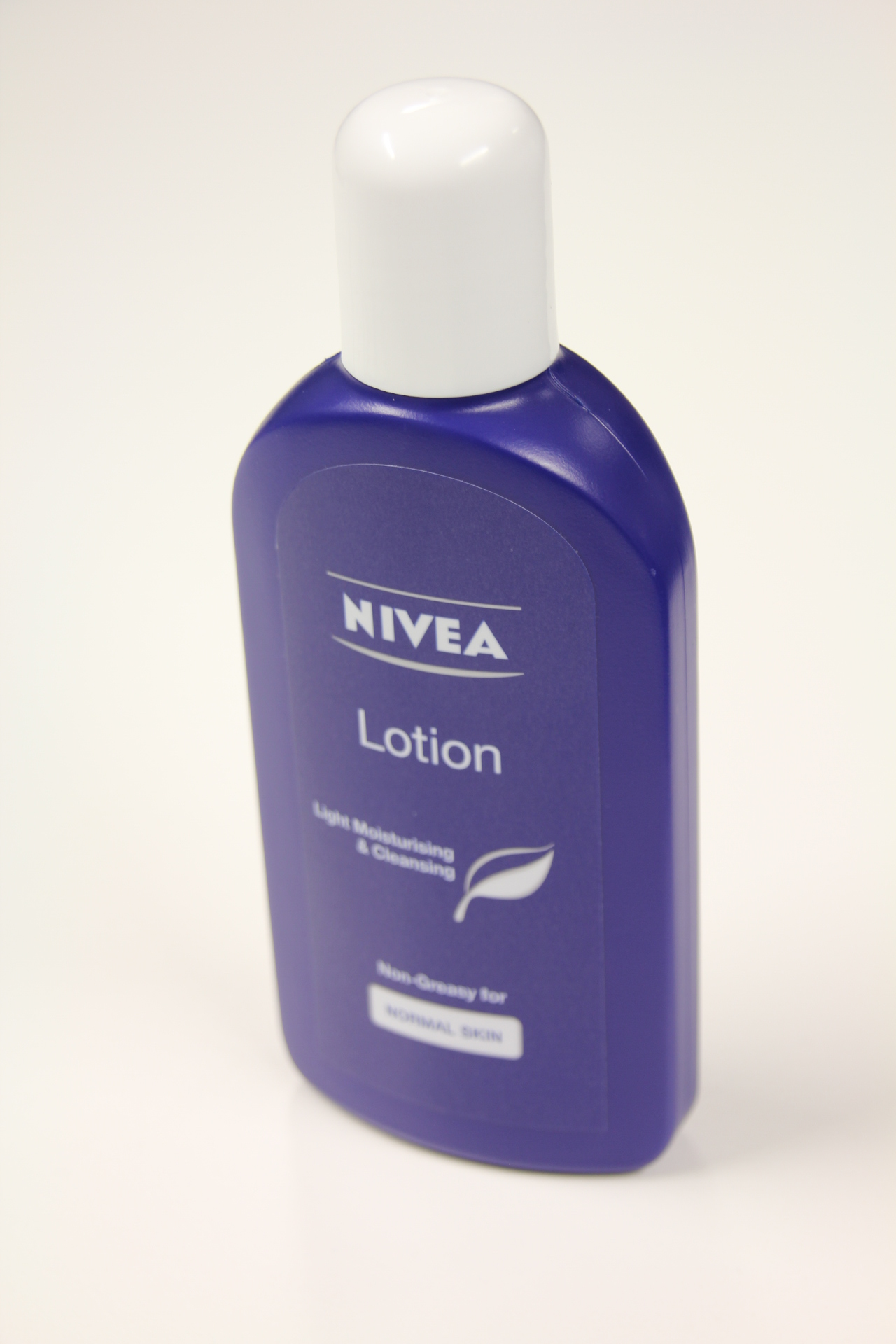
Nivea Lotion

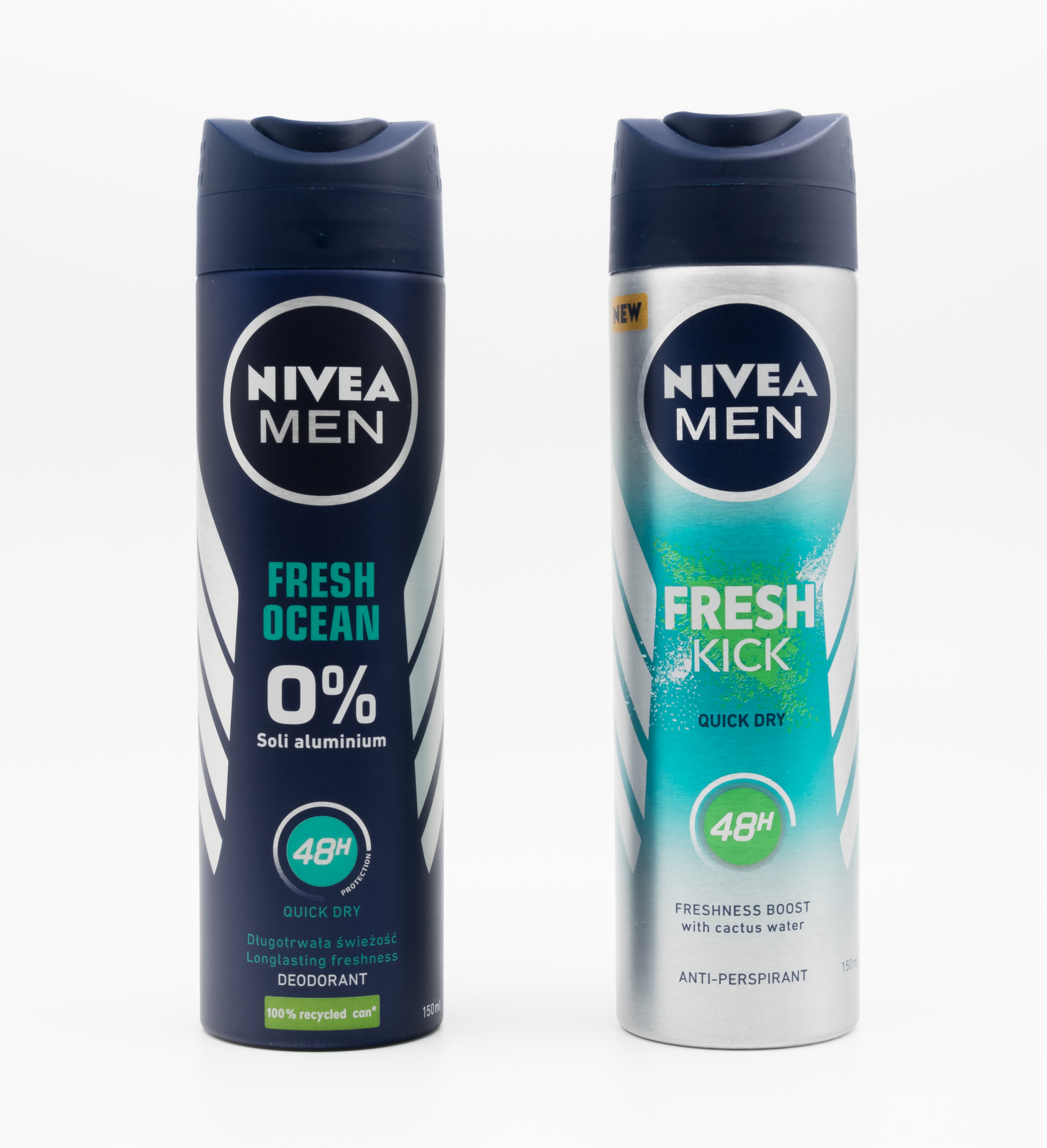
Men's deodorant

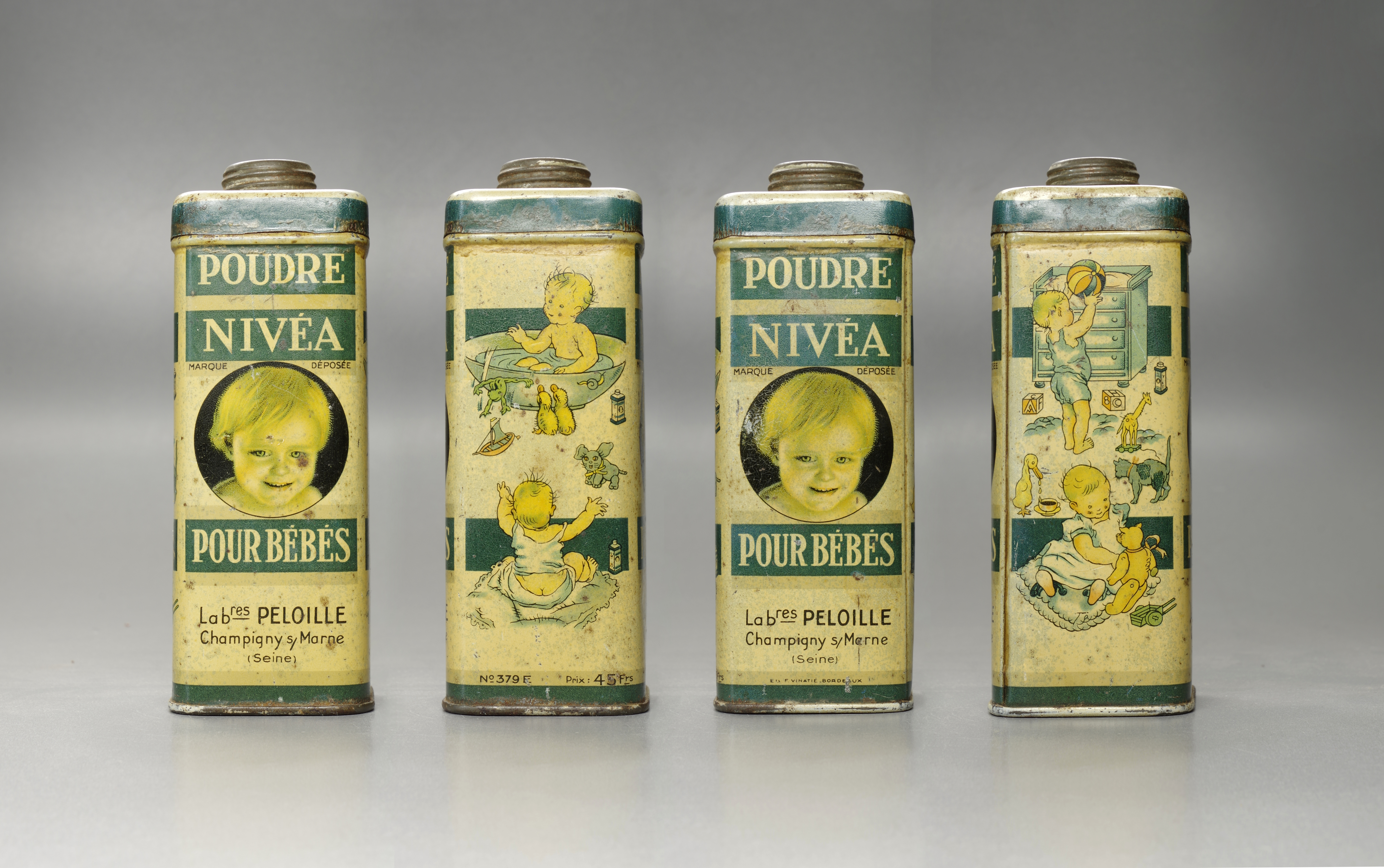
Nivea baby powder from France

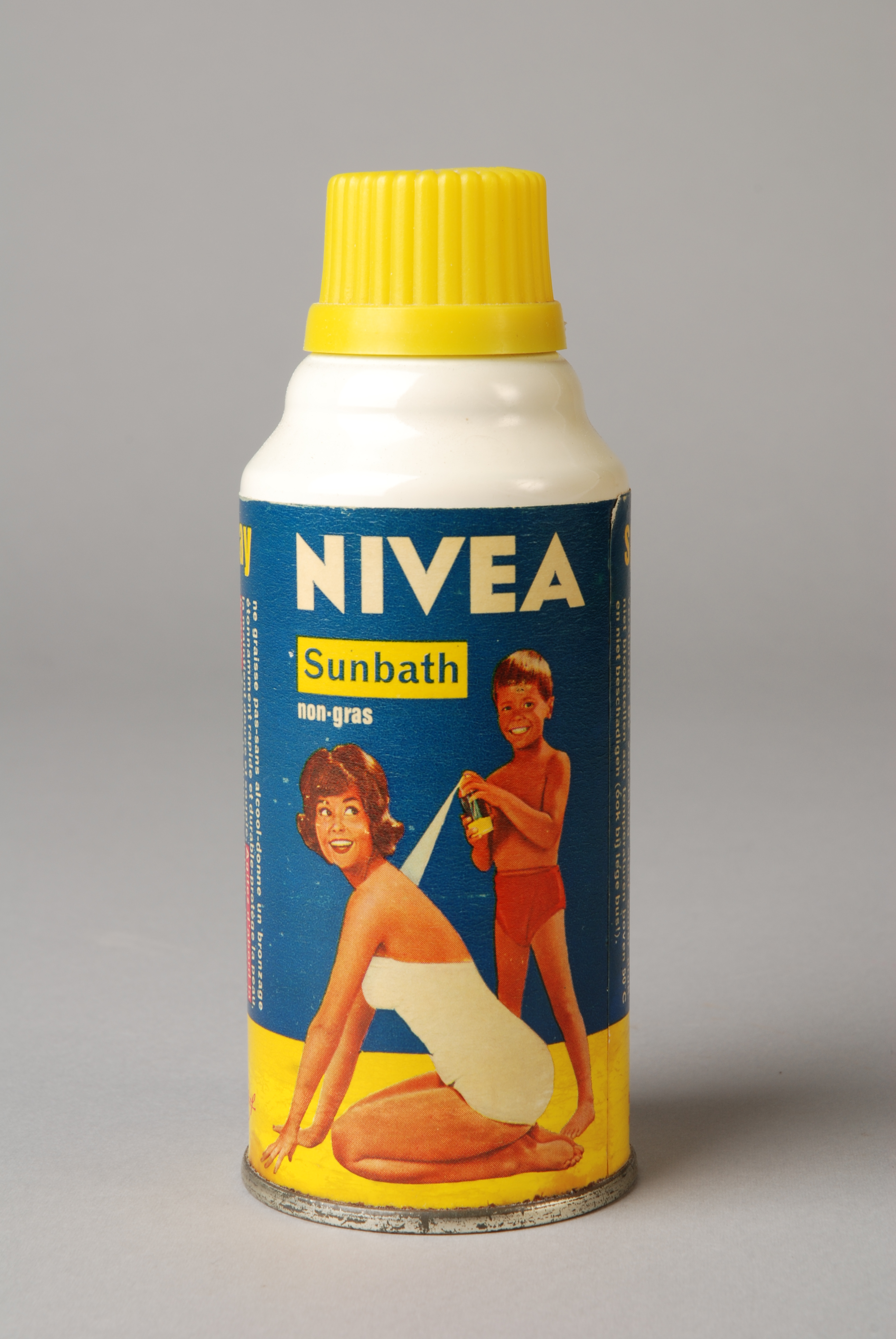
"Nivea Sunbath" spray can

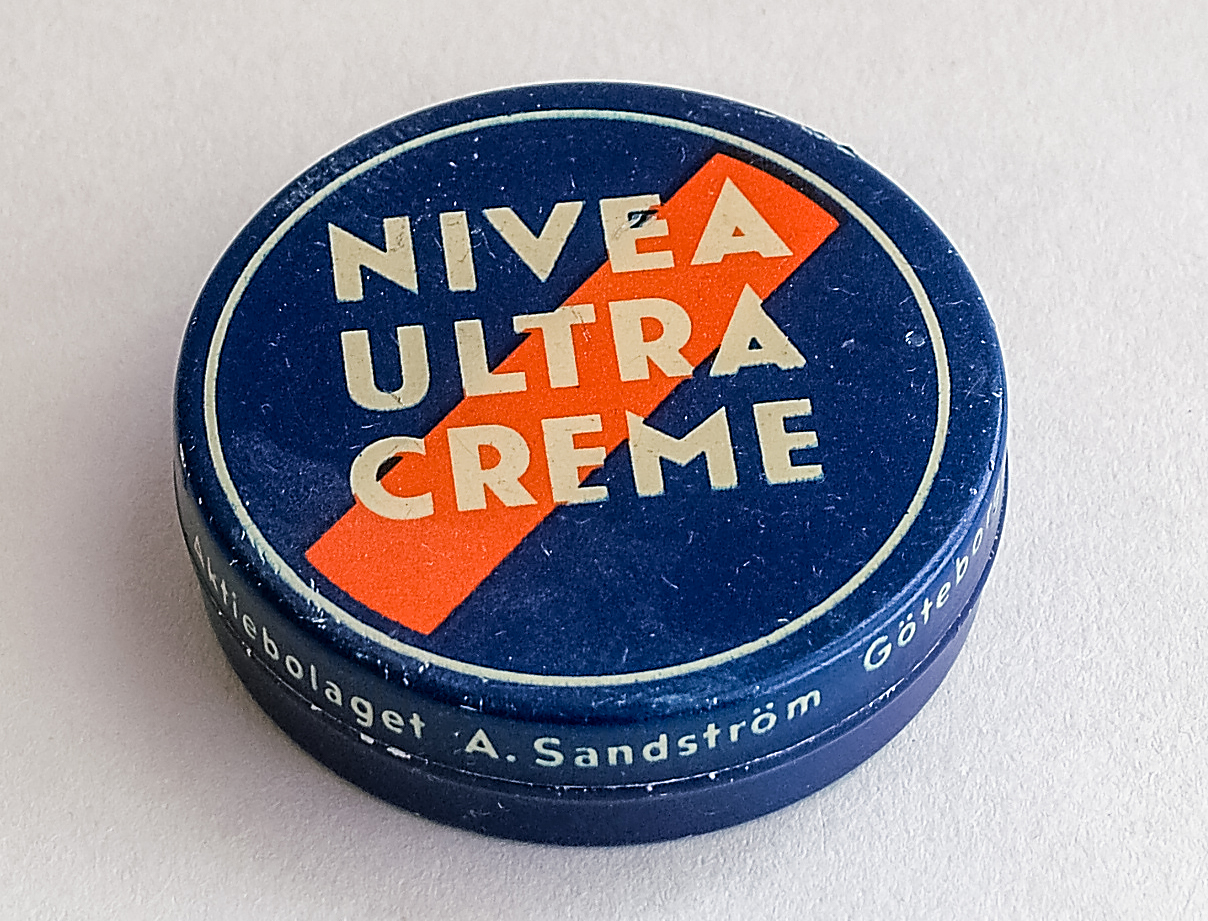
Nivea Ultra Creme, old Swedish tin jar

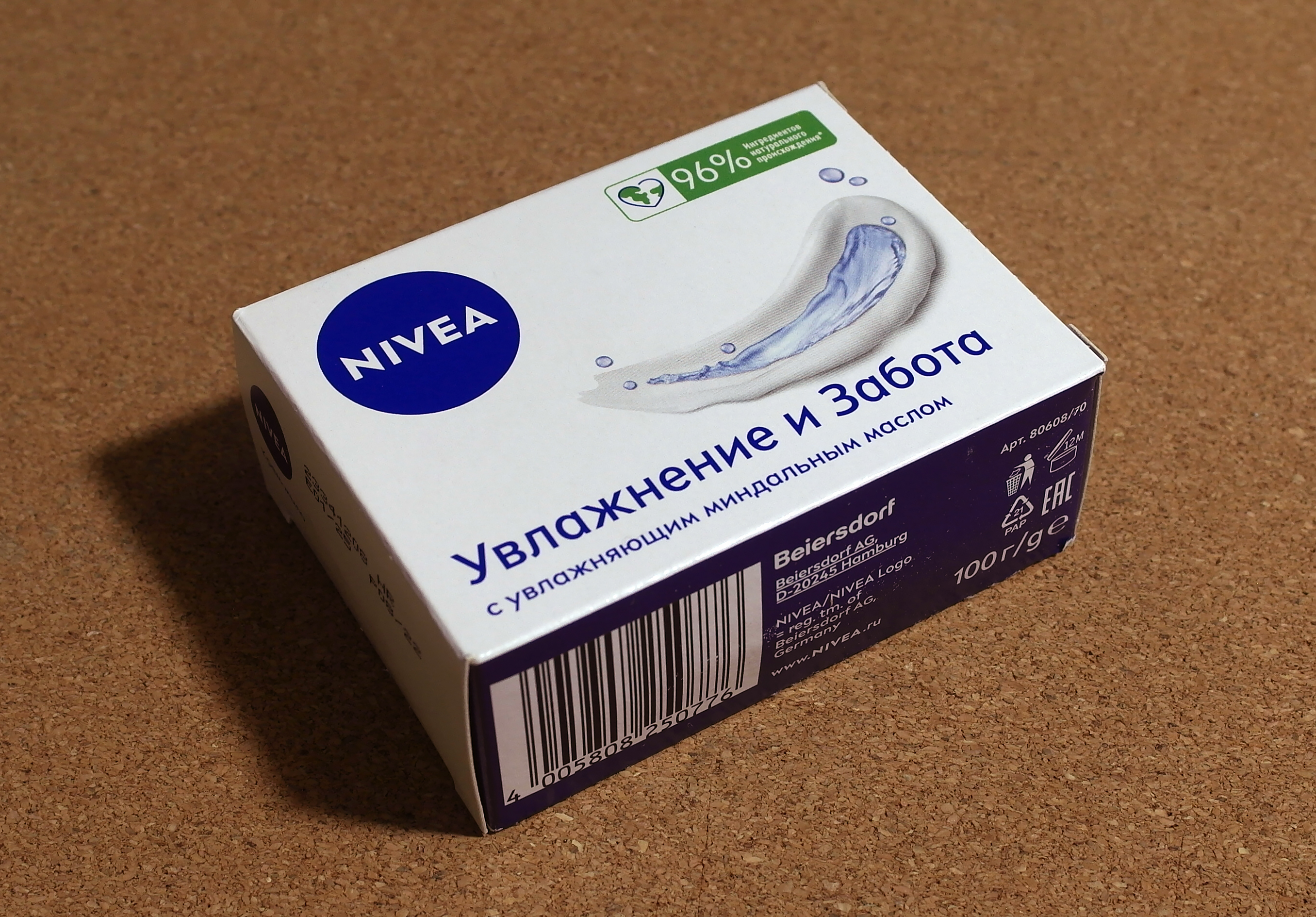
Nivea soap from Russia

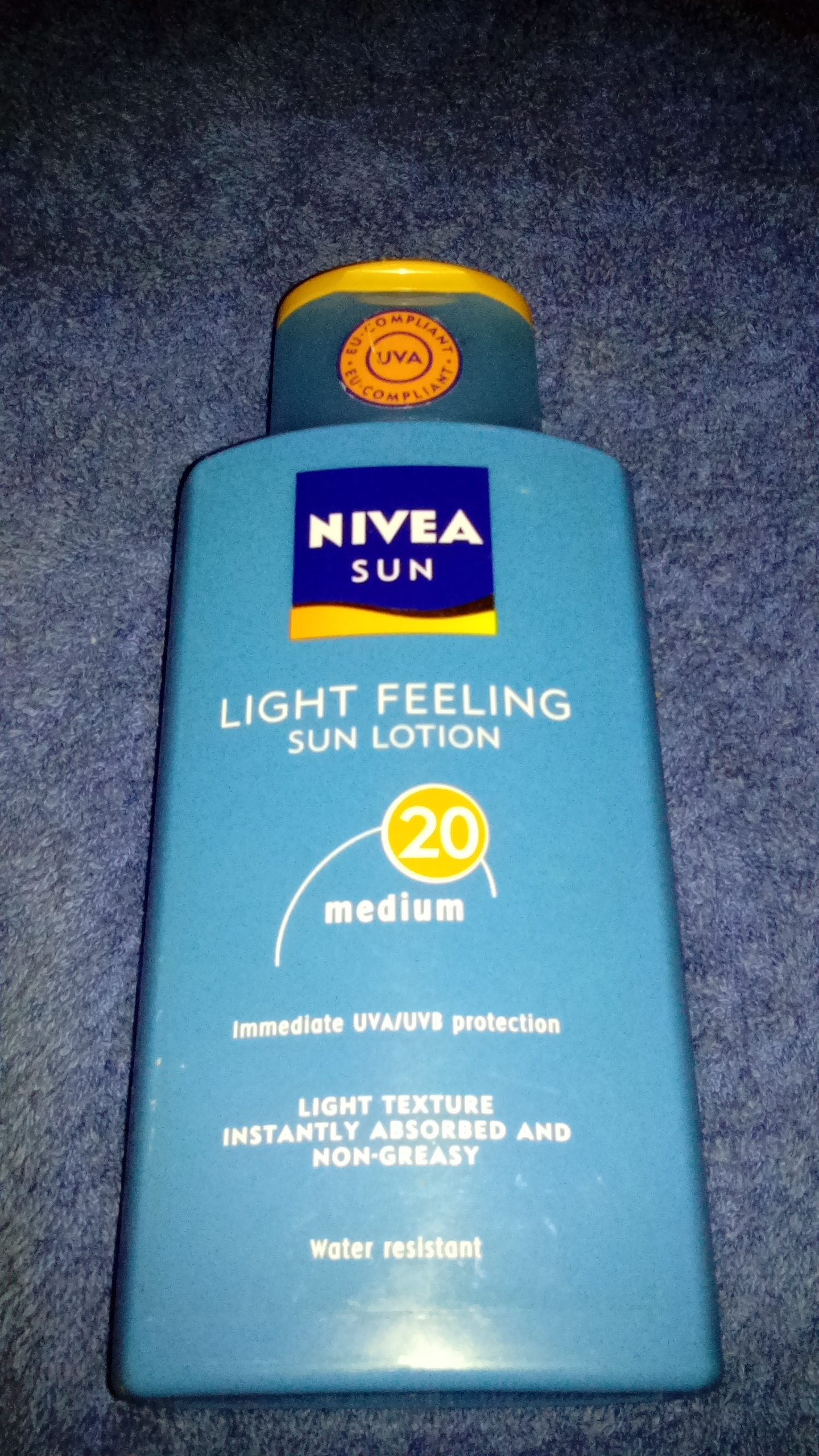
Nivea Suncream
