= Lip balm =

Skin care product

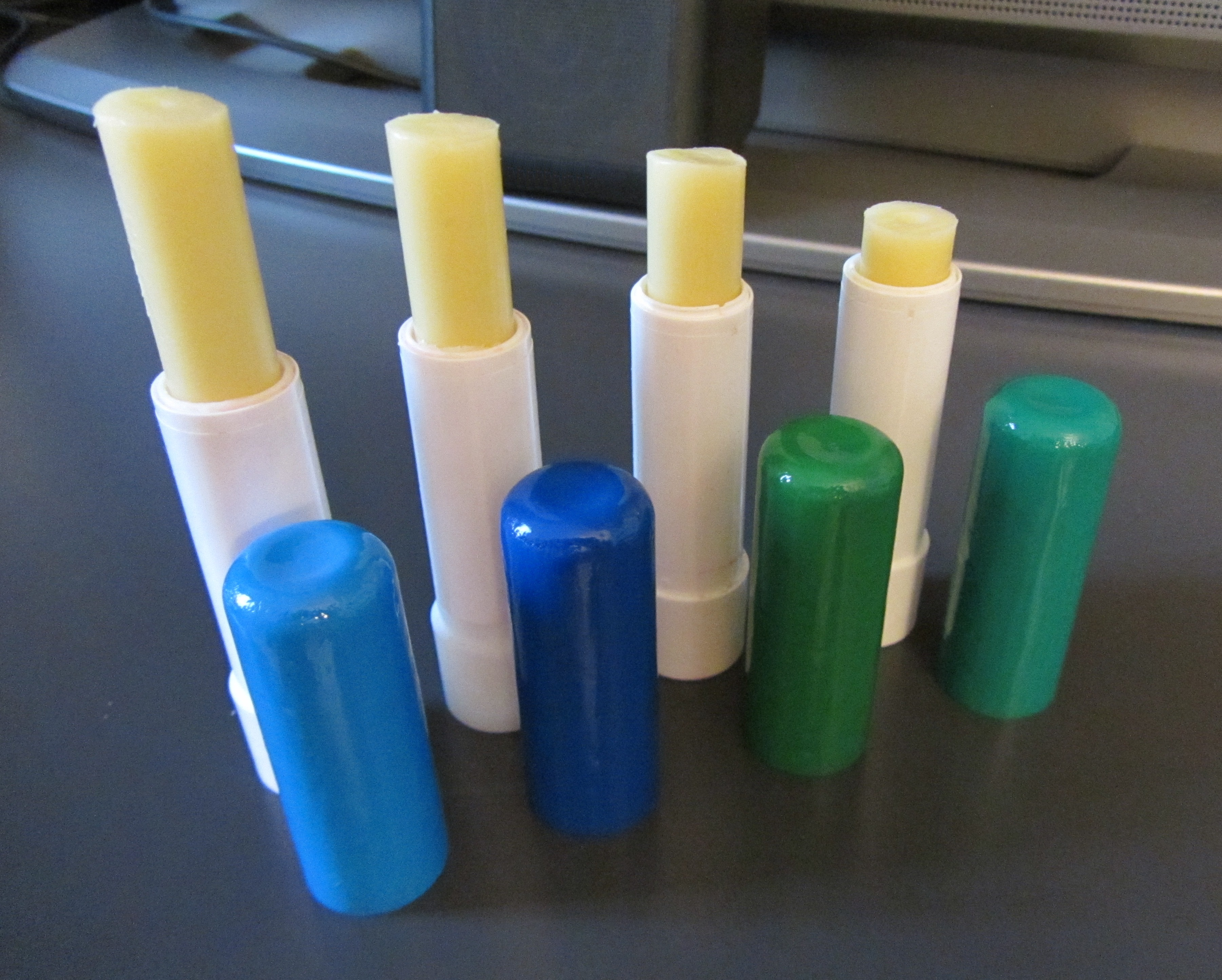
Homemade lip balms

Lip balm or lip salve is a wax-like substance applied to the lips to moisturize and relieve chapped or dry lips, angular cheilitis, stomatitis, or cold sores. Lip balm often contains beeswax or carnauba wax, camphor, cetyl alcohol, lanolin, paraffin, and petrolatum, among other ingredients. Some varieties contain dyes, flavor, fragrance, phenol, salicylic acid, and sunscreen.

== Overview ==
The primary purpose of lip balm is to provide an occlusive layer on the lip surface, sealing in moisture and protecting the lips from external exposure. Dry air, cold temperatures, and wind all have a drying effect on skin by drawing moisture away from the body. Lips are particularly vulnerable because the skin is so thin, and thus they are often the first to present signs of dryness. Occlusive materials like waxes and petroleum jelly prevent moisture loss and maintain lip comfort while flavorings, colorants, sunscreens, and various medicaments can provide additional, specific benefits. Common ingredients in lip balms include beeswax, candelilla wax, and carnauba wax, which help create a protective barrier.

Lip balm can be applied by a finger to the lips, or in a lipstick-style tube from which it can be applied directly.

In 2022, the global lip balm market was valued at US$732.76 million. The market is predicted to grow at a rate of 9.28% within the next five years and is likely to reach US$1.25 billion by 2027.

=== Production ===
Production for lip balms includes the following stages:

- Raw materials are checked for its quality (cosmetic products must comply with strict safety standards)
- The ingredients are dosed, melted, and mixed (this stage involves special equipment)
- This mixture is
  - treated in a vacuum to remove bubbles
  - crystallized for about 48 hours
  - then remelted
  - cut into pieces which are shaped as required
- The lip balm is packaged into a casing

== History ==
=== Early lip balms ===
Since 40 BC, the Egyptians made treatment for lip care, which was made with a mixture of beeswax, olive oil, and animal fat.

=== United States ===
In the 1800s, Lydia Maria Child recommended earwax as a treatment for cracked lips in her highly popular book The American Frugal Housewife, Child observed that, "Those who are troubled with cracked lips have found this earwax remedy successful when others have failed. It is one of those sorts of cures, which are very likely to be laughed at; but I know of its having produced very beneficial results." The invention of the lip balm was first formally invented in the 1880s by physician Charles Browne Fleet though its origins may be traced to earwax. Fleet later named his lip balm product "ChapStick".

In 1872, chemist Robert Chesebrough discovered and sampled a new petroleum jelly, initially describing it as a "natural, waxy ingredient, rich in minerals from deep within the earth" which could be used as a solution for skin repair. He then distributed his product under the name "Wonder Jelly" before shortly changing it to "Vaseline".

In the early 1880s, Charles Brown Fleet created ChapStick. However, due to the lack of sales, Fleet sold his formula and rights to ChapStick to John Morton in 1912 for $5, who saw the marketing potential in the brand. After making the purchase, Morton commissioned Frank Wright, Jr. to create a design for the logo of ChapStick for $15 in 1936. In 1972, ChapStick tubes concealing hidden microphones were used during the Watergate scandal.

In 1937, Alfred Woelbing created Carmex to treat cold sores in Milwaukee, though the occurrence of World War II would slow the production and sales due to the lack of lanolin. In 1980, Carmex underwent a product change by converting its packaging into squeezable tubes.

In 1973, Bonne Bell created the first flavored lip balm and marketed the company as Lip Smackers. The company would later collaborate on various different-flavored lip balms including Dr Pepper in 1975, the Wrigley Company in 2004, and The Coca-Cola Company in 2006. Bonne Bell also collaborated with Disney to produce lip balms with various princess characters in 2010.

In 1991, Burt Shavitz and Roxanne Quimby created their first beeswax based lip balm solution through their company, Burt's Bees. In 2020, it was reported that Burt's Bees had used 50 percent of recycled material to package various products and that 100 percent of the products were recyclable.

In 2011, Evolution of Smooth (or commonly known as EOS) created a spherical-shaped lip balm as well as describing its 95% organic ingredients.

=== Cannabis infused lip balms ===
With the gradual legalization of cannabis in the United States, some companies have produced lip balms containing doses of THC or CBD oil. The lip balms were infused with a low dosage of THC in order to prevent the occurrence of any psychoactive or related effect.

== Notable brands ==
- Burt's Bees
- Blistex
- Carmex
- ChapStick
- Labello
- Lip Smacker
- Lypsyl
- EOS
- Summer Fridays Lip Butter Balm
- Vaseline
- Aquaphor
- Nivea

== Dependency ==
=== Addictive ingredients ===
Some physicians have suggested that certain types of lip balm can be addictive or contain ingredients that actually cause drying, the accuracy of which has been debated by many professionals. Lip balm manufacturers sometimes state in their FAQs that there is nothing addictive in their products or that all ingredients are listed and approved by the FDA. Claims regarding potentially irritating ingredients in some lip balms have been disputed, with no evidence supporting extreme allegations. However, some experts such as dermatologist Dr. Cynthia Bailey state that some ingredients in lip balm directly causes sensitive lip skin which may lead to addiction. Dermatology professor Marcia Driscoll also adds onto this argument by stating that aroma ingredients found in flavored or scented lip balms have the potential to irritate skin.

=== Causes for Dependency ===
According to a report, professor Brad Rohu states that it is natural for the lips to feel dry. The exposure to environments with cold, dry, or windy weather can directly cause the chapping of the lips as well as behaviors such as lip licking or mouth breathing. These factors may directly contribute to an increased amount of lip balm usage. According to dermatologist Amy Derick, those who have expressed dependencies on lip balm have developed a desire of how the lips feel after application. She also mentions that the variety of lip balm flavor may also directly cause lip balm dependency as a person may want to lick their lips to taste the flavor, which may consequentially remove the lip balm coating from the lips. This may also leave saliva on the lips which can dry up and make the lips feel even more dry than they initially were.

== Effects on lip barrier ==
The human lips have an inadequate capability of holding moisture as well as an imperfect lip barrier function. The Journal of the American Academy of Dermatology performed a study in order to determine whether consistent use of lip balm would enhance the overall quality of the lips. The study used 32 female participants within the ages of 20 to 40 years and the participants had mild to moderate dried lips without any history of health-related complications. The participants underwent a procedure in which no lip treatment was provided on the first three days, then two weeks of consistent lip balm usage, and then a period of no treatment for three days. The study determined the quality of the lips based on the physical details and appearance throughout the study. The study showed a direct improvement of the physical details of the lips except for lip cracking during the second week of treatment and after the period of no treatment. The study also showed that hydration of the lips lasted for approximately eight hours after usage and the lip balm improved the lip barrier function despite discontinued usage. The study concluded that lip balms assist the hydration of the lips which consequentially improves the lip barrier function and the quality. This study was completely funded by Burt's Bees, a lip balm company.

== Mineral oil ==
In 2015, German consumer watchdog Stiftung Warentest analyzed cosmetics containing mineral oils. After developing a new detection method they found high concentrations of Mineral Oil Aromatic Hydrocarbons (MOAH) and even polyaromatics in products containing mineral oils with Vaseline products containing the most MOAH of all tested cosmetics (up to 9%). The European Food Safety Authority sees MOAH and polyaromatics as possibly carcinogenic. Based on the results, Stiftung Warentest warns not to use Vaseline or any product that is based on mineral oils for lip care.

== Lip balm market ==
=== United States ===
In 2019, a research report conducted by the Statista Research Department concluded that ChapStick was the leading lip balm brand in the United States with an approximate unit sale of 55.8 million. Carmex was the second leading brand with approximately 35.2 million units sold and Burt's Bees being the third leading brand with approximately 32.3 million units sold.

Lip balm sales in the United States
Brand	Unit sales (in millions)
Aquaphor	4.1
Blistex	23.9
Burt's Bees	32.3
Carmex	35.2
ChapStick	55.8
ChapStick Classic	9
ChapStick Total Hydration	6.5
EOS	9.2
Private Label	7.1
Vaseline Lip Therapy	13

== Trends ==
=== Beezin' ===
Beezin' is a trend dating back to 2013 in which a person applies Burt's Bees brand lip balm onto the eyelids. The practice is done in order to feel a sensation of being high or drunk, and even to increase the desired effects of alcohol and other substances. In 2022, Beezin' became a viral trend on the social media platform TikTok. Some ingredients, including peppermint oil, are known to be eye irritants which can cause an unintentional inflammatory response which may require treatment and may also cause dermatitis on the eyelids.
