= ChapStick =

Brand name of lip balm

- ChapStick logo

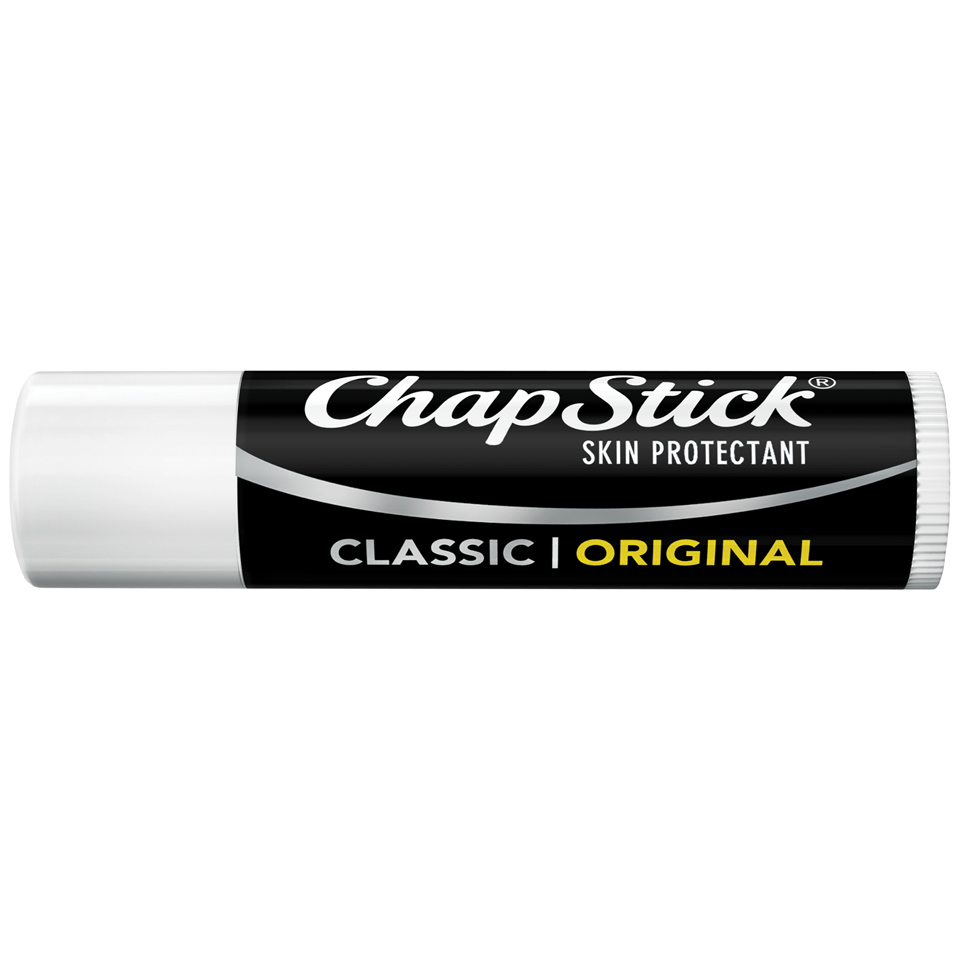
- ChapStick Classic Original lip balm
- Product type: Lip balm
- Current owner: Evermark
- Country: United States
- Introduced: Early 1880s
- Previous owners: Wyeth; Pfizer; GSK; Haleon
- Website: chapstick.com

ChapStick is an American brand of lip balm that is manufactured by Evermark and is used in many countries worldwide. It is intended to help treat and prevent chapped lips, hence the name. Many varieties also include sunscreen to avoid sunburn.

Due to its popularity, the term has become a genericized trademark. It popularly refers to any lip balm contained in a lipstick-style tube and applied in the same manner as lipstick. However, the term is still a registered trademark, with rights exclusively owned by Evermark.

ChapStick generated $142 million in revenue in 2023.

== History ==
In the early 1880s, Charles Browne Fleet, a physician and pharmacological thinker from Lynchburg, Virginia, invented ChapStick as a lip balm product. The handmade product, which resembled a wickless candle wrapped in tin foil, was sold locally and did not have much success.

In 1912, John Morton, also a Lynchburg resident, bought the rights to the product for five dollars. Mrs. Morton melted the pink ChapStick mixture in their kitchen, cooled it, and cut it into sticks. Their lucrative sales were used to found the Morton Manufacturing Corporation.

In 1935, Frank Wright, Jr., a commercial artist from Lynchburg, Virginia, was commissioned to design the CHET ChapStick logo that is still used today. He was paid a one-time fee of $15.

In 1963, The A.H. Robins Company acquired ChapStick from Morton Manufacturing Corporation. At that time, only the ChapStick Lip Balm regular stick was being marketed to consumers; subsequently, many more varieties were introduced. This includes ChapStick four-flavored sticks in 1971, ChapStick Sunblock 15 in 1981, ChapStick Petroleum Jelly Plus in 1985, and ChapStick Medicated in 1992.

Robins was purchased by American Home Products (AHP) in 1988. AHP later changed its name to Wyeth. ChapStick was a Wyeth product until 2009 when Wyeth was acquired by Pfizer. Pfizer sold the manufacturing facility in Richmond, Virginia, on October 3, 2011, to Fareva Richmond, which now manufactures and packages ChapStick for Pfizer.

In 2019, GlaxoSmithKline Consumer Healthcare acquired ChapStick from Pfizer. In July 2022, GlaxoSmithKline spun off its consumer brands, including ChapStick, into a new consumer health company named Haleon.

In January 2024, it was announced that Suave Brands Co. (SBC) would acquire the brand from Haleon for $510 million. SBC had been formed a year earlier by Yellow Wood Partners, a Boston-based private equity firm, to purchase the North American rights to the Suave brand previously owned by Unilever. In June 2024, it was reported that SBC had completed the purchase of the brand in a deal valued at approximately $430 million.

== Composition ==
Ingredients commonly include camphor, beeswax, menthol, petrolatum, phenol, vitamin E, aloe and oxybenzone. However, there are many variants of ChapStick, each with its composition. Due to safety concerns, phenol is banned from use in cosmetic products in the European Union and Canada.

The full list of ingredients in a regular-flavored ChapStick is:

arachidyl propionate, camphor, carnauba wax, cetyl alcohol, D&C red no. 6 barium lake, FD&C yellow no. 5 aluminum lake, fragrance, isopropyl lanolate, isopropyl myristate, lanolin, light mineral oil, methylparaben, octyldodecanol, oleyl alcohol, paraffin, phenyl trimethicone, propylparaben, titanium dioxide, white wax, propanol. Its net weight is usually 4 grams (0.14 oz).

When manufactured by Wyeth, Chapstick contained no parabens.

== Uses ==
ChapStick functions as both a sunscreen, available with SPFs as high as 50, and a skin lubricant to help prevent and protect chafed, chapped, sunburned, cracked, and windburned lips. "Medicated" varieties also contain analgesics to relieve sore lips. In addition to medical uses, ChapStick has had other uses; the lubricating properties have been useful on precision instruments such as slide rules. Other lubricants, while appropriate to the instruments, might have been harmful to the skin, while ChapStick is not.

== Marketing ==
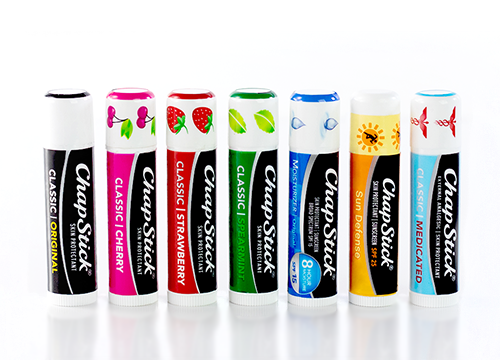
ChapStick Classic range

ChapStick is sometimes available in special flavors developed in connection with marketing partners such as Disney (as in cross-promotions with Winnie the Pooh or the movie Cars) or with charitable causes such as breast cancer awareness, in which 30¢ is donated for each stick sold (as in the Susan G. Komen Pink Pack). The Flava-Craze line is marketed to preteens and young teens, with colorful applicators and "fun" flavors such as Grape Craze and Blue Crazeberry.

US Olympic skier Suzy Chaffee starred in ChapStick television commercials, in which she dubbed herself "Suzy ChapStick". Another ChapStick advertisement includes basketball athlete Julius Erving (commonly known as Dr. J) naming himself Dr. ChapStick and promoting the brand to young children.

Diana Golden, a U.S. Olympic gold medal-winning skier and 1988, Ski Racing Magazine and United States Olympic Committee female skier of the year, was also a spokesperson for ChapStick. Former ski racer Picabo Street, for a time, was seen on television commercials as one of the company's endorsers.

Its main competitors in the United States—Carmex and Blistex—also use the popular lipstick-style tube for their lip balm products. In Iceland and in the United Kingdom, the product's main competitor is Lypsyl, made by Novartis Consumer Health and distributed in similar packaging to ChapStick.

== See also ==
- Chapstick lesbian, a play on lipstick lesbian
