= Beiersdorf =

German multinational consumer goods company

Beiersdorf AG
- Beiersdorf's logo used since January 2014

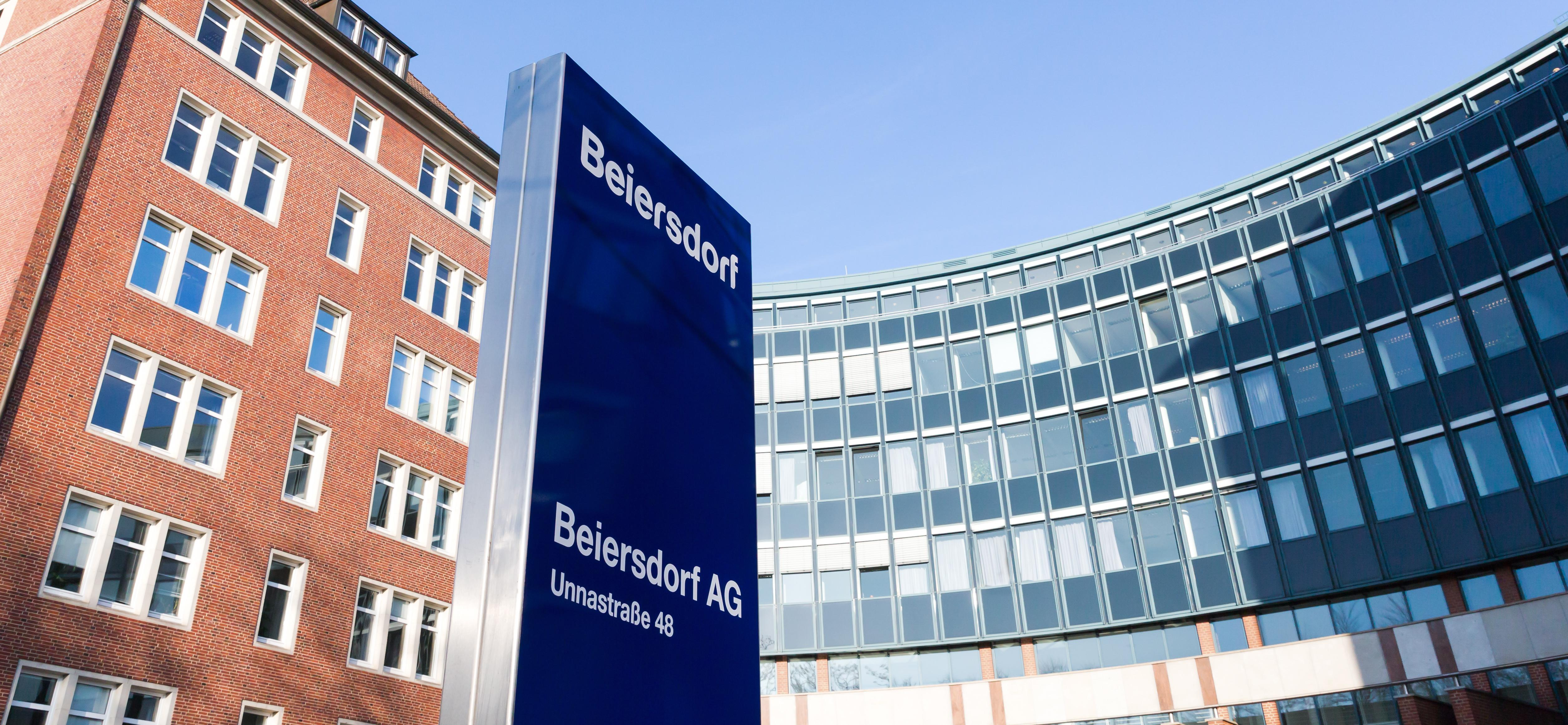
- Headquarters in Hamburg, Germany
- Type: Public (AG)
- Traded as: FWB: BEI; DAX component
- Industry: Consumer goods
- Founded: 28 March 1882; 144 years ago
- Founder: Paul Beiersdorf
- Headquarters: Hamburg, Germany
- Area served: Worldwide
- Key people: Vincent Warnery (CEO and Chairman of the executive board); Reinhard Pöllath (Chairman of the supervisory board)
- Products: Skin care; Personal care
- Revenue: ▲€9.85 billion (2024)
- Operating income: ▲€1.29 billion (2024)
- Net income: ▲€928 million (2024)
- Total assets: ▲€7.71 billion (2024)
- Total equity: ▼€2.54 billion (2024)
- Owner: Maxingvest (50.49%)
- Number of employees: 22,678 (2024)
- Website: www.beiersdorf.com

Beiersdorf AG is a German multinational company that manufactures personal-care products and pressure-sensitive adhesives headquartered in Hamburg, Germany. Its brands include Elastoplast, Eucerin, Aquaphor, Labello, La Prairie, Nivea, Coppertone and Tesa.

Although its shares are publicly listed, Beiersdorf is controlled by Maxingvest AG (parent company of Tchibo), which directly owns 50.49% of shares.

== Corporate structure and business segments ==
Beiersdorf is organized in two separate business segments: consumer business and Tesa. The consumer business segment focuses on skin care, while the Tesa business, on self-adhesive products. Besides Nivea, Beiersdorf is the owner of other brands like 8x4, Eucerin, Labello, La Prairie, Hansaplast, Chantecaille, and Florena.

=== Divisional organization ===
In 1974, the company introduced a divisional organization for cosmed, medical, pharma and Tesa. In 1989, the divisional organization was changed into skin care, adhesive products and wound care. The product range of Nivea and Tesa was expanded—especially Nivea products - the typical cream, sun creams, anti-age products and baby care. In April 2001, the Tesa business segment was founded as an independent unit within Beiersdorf. Tesa focuses on developing self-adhesive products.

== Affiliates worldwide ==
Beiersdorf is a global company with more than 160 affiliates worldwide. Its headquarters are located in Hamburg, Germany, as well as its research centre where new products are developed. With Nivea and Labello, the company had two strong brands from the first day and developed quickly into an international company. Due to the Second World War, the process of expansion temporarily stopped. It took some years to come back on the international stage as Beiersdorf had to rebuy the trademark rights. But at the end of the 1990s, 70 percent of the company's sales revenue was being generated outside Germany. Europe is the key market with 58 locations but the company keeps building its presence in markets around the world. The site in Vienna is being developed to a center for Central and Eastern Europe. Regional research centers are located in Wuhan (China) and Silao (Mexico) so the scientists can respond more effectively to the needs of the local markets.

== History ==
=== The first steps ===
The previous logo from 1992 to 2014

The company was founded in 1882 in Hamburg by pharmacist Paul Beiersdorf and was sold to Oscar Troplowitz in 1890. Beiersdorf's patent for the manufacture of coated plasters, dated 28 March 1882, is generally regarded as the company's founding date.

In 1909, the company introduced its first lip care product under the brand Labello. During this period, Troplowitz collaborated with dermatologist Paul Gerson Unna and chemist Isaak Lifschütz on the development of skin care products. Lifschütz's discovery of the emulsifier Eucerit enabled the formulation of a stable cream, leading to the market introduction of Nivea Crème in December 1911.

The company expanded during the early 20th century. Its workforce increased from 11 employees in 1890 to approximately 500 by 1918. In 1892, Troplowitz acquired a new headquarters in Hamburg-Eimsbüttel, allowing for the mechanisation of production and an expansion of the product range. By this time, Beiersdorf products were distributed in multiple international markets.

Following the deaths of Oscar Troplowitz and his business partner Otto Hanns Mankiewicz in 1918, the company underwent organisational restructuring. On 1 June 1922, it was incorporated as P. Beiersdorf & Co. AG. In the same year, the company introduced Hansaplast. In 1925, the design of the Nivea Crème tin was changed to the blue-and-white version that remains in use.

In 1928, Beiersdorf shares were listed on the Hamburg Stock Exchange. By the late 1920s, the company operated more than 20 production sites worldwide. During the 1930s, Beiersdorf expanded its portfolio to include products such as shaving cream and shampoo. In 1936, Tesa was established as an umbrella brand for self-adhesive technologies, with the introduction of a transparent adhesive film later marketed as Tesa Film.

=== During the Second World War ===
Due to the pressure of the Nazis, in 1933 Jewish board members, such as the chairman Willy Jacobsohn, had to resign. Jacobsohn emigrated to Amsterdam and managed the international subsidiaries up to the year 1938 when he left Amsterdam and went to the US. During the Nazi regime, Carl Claussen was chairman and led the company through the difficult time. Elly Heuss-Knapp, married to Theodor Heuss and after the war the new First Lady of the Federal Republic of Germany, was a freelancer at Beiersdorf and responsible for important parts of the Nivea advertising. She took care of keeping the advertising messages free from Nazi ideology. After the war, most of the production sites and the administration building in Hamburg lay ruined. Furthermore, most of the international subsidiaries had been expropriated and Beiersdorf lost the Nivea trademark rights. In 1949, Beiersdorf generated a turnover of 30 million Deutsche Mark.

=== After the 1950s ===
In 1951, Beiersdorf introduced its first deodorant soap, marking the origin of the 8x4 brand.

By 1972, the company employed more than 10,000 people worldwide. In 1974, Beiersdorf adopted a divisional organizational structure, separating its operations into cosmetics, medical, pharmaceutical, and Tesa divisions. In the same period, the heirs of Max Herz, owners of Tchibo, acquired a 25 percent stake in the company.

In 1981, Beiersdorf reported a turnover of 2 billion Deutsche Mark. During the late 1980s, the company revised its strategic orientation, concentrating on three core areas: skin care, adhesive technologies, and wound management. Production processes were standardized, international brand management was consolidated, and the product portfolio was aligned with these areas. The Nivea and Tesa product ranges were subsequently expanded.

During the 1990s, Beiersdorf reacquired outstanding trademark rights in several key markets, including Great Britain, Australia, and South Africa. In 1997, the company regained its final outstanding trademark rights through the acquisition of a majority stake in the Polish company Beiersdorf-Lechia S.A. in Poznań (now Nivea Polska sp. z o.o.).

=== Since 2000 ===
In 2001, Tesa was established as a subsidiary of Beiersdorf AG, focusing on adhesive products and systems.

On 1 April 2001, Beiersdorf founded BSN Medical as a joint venture with Smith & Nephew. The company operated in the fields of surgical dressings, orthopaedics, and phlebology. In 2004, BSN Medical employed approximately 3,750 people worldwide and reported annual revenues of €504 million. In 2006, BSN Medical was sold to Montagu Private Equity for €1.03 billion.

In 2002, Beiersdorf established Beiersdorf Shared Services GmbH, consolidating internal IT and accounting functions for the group.

In 2003, a takeover attempt by Procter & Gamble concluded without completion. At the time, Allianz held 19.6% of Beiersdorf’s shares. Concerns were raised locally that the bid focused primarily on Beiersdorf's brands rather than the company as an integrated enterprise. In response, the City of Hamburg and its state-owned holding company HGV supported a restructuring of the shareholding. The Herz family, owners of Tchibo, increased their stake to 49.9%. Allianz retained 3.6%, while Beiersdorf AG repurchased 7.4% of its own shares, including 3% allocated to the Beiersdorf pension fund. Another private family shareholder maintained its holding. This ownership structure resulted in Beiersdorf retaining its headquarters in Hamburg. In June 2009, Allianz further reduced its shareholding from 7.2% to 2.88%.

Beiersdorf expanded its manufacturing presence in India with the establishment of a production and research facility in Sanand, Gujarat, supplementing its long-standing market presence through the Nivea brand. In 2023, Nivea was recognized as "India's Most Desired Skincare Brand" as per the TRA's Most Desired Brands 2023 report, highlighting its continued success in the Indian market.

In 2006, Beiersdorf opened the first Nivea Haus retail concept store in Hamburg, followed by additional locations in other cities.

Beiersdorf was fined by Autorité de la concurrence in France in 2016 for price-fixing on personal hygiene products.

In 2020, Beiersdorf acquired the natural cosmetics brand "Stop the Water While Using Me", which was later discontinued in 2023. In February 2022, the company completed the acquisition of the luxury skincare brand "Chantecaille".

== Stock exchange ==
Since 22 December 2008, Beiersdorf AG has been traded on the Deutschen Aktienindex (DAX).
