= Oscar Troplowitz =

German pharmacist and entrepreneur (1863–1918)

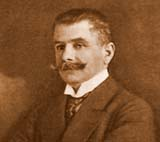
- Oscar Troplowitz
- Born: 18 January 1863; Gleiwitz, Prussia (now Gliwice, Poland)
- Died: 27 April 1918 (aged 55); Hamburg, Germany
- Occupations: Pharmacist; entrepreneur

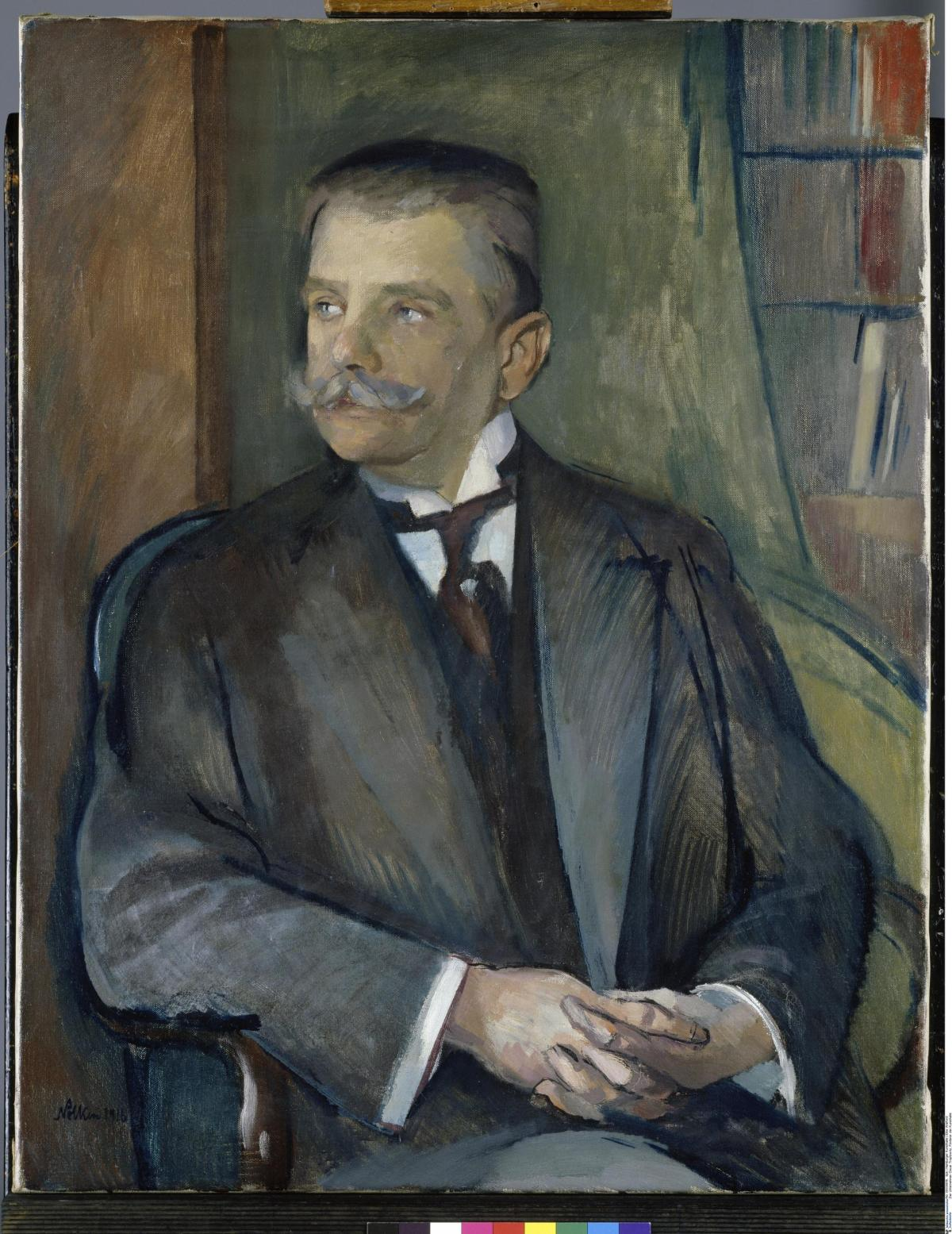
Portrait of Oscar Troplowitz by Franz Nölken, 1916

Oscar Troplowitz (18 January 1863 – 27 April 1918) was a German pharmacist and entrepreneur.

Troplowitz was born to a Jewish family in Gleiwitz. He trained at Heidelberg University and in 1890 he purchased Beiersdorf AG, which at the time was a chemist's shop and laboratory in Hamburg run by Paul Beiersdorf (1836–1896). Soon afterwards, Troplowitz expanded the company into selling brand-name merchandise as well.

Under Troplowitz's ownership, the company developed several of its own products, including Nivea, Leukoplast, Labello, and a pressure-sensitive tape that would later be known as "Tesafilm". As did Paul Beiersdorf, Troplowitz maintained a close business relationship with dermatologist Paul Gerson Unna (1850–1929). It was on a recommendation by Unna that Troplowitz hired Isaak Lifschütz, a chemist who was the discoverer of the emulsifying agent Eucerit, the main ingredient in Nivea, a brand which he acquired in 1911 from French company Guerlain.

Troplowitz made several reforms in regards to worker benefits at Beiersdorf, such as paid vacations, maternity leave, and a 48-hour work week.

== Bibliography ==
- Beiersdorf, Leonie, Claussen, Christine : Oscar Troplowitz : ein Leben für Hamburg, Ostfildern : Hatje Cantz, 2013, ISBN 978-3-7757-3538-4.
