= Eucerin =

Trade marked brand of Beiersdorf AG

- Product type: Skin care brand
- Current owner: Beiersdorf AG
- Country: Germany
- Introduced: 1902; 124 years ago
- Website: Official website

Eucerin (/ˈjuːsərɪn/ YOO-sər-in, German: [ɔʏtseˈʁiːn]) is a trademarked brand of Beiersdorf AG. Its formulas are used in topical skincare products.

== History ==
In 1900, Isaac Lifschütz manufactured a non-perishable and sleek ointment base consisting of Eucerit, water and oil, naming it Eucerin.

Two years later, in 1902, Lifschütz achieved the patent for his manufacture in Germany.

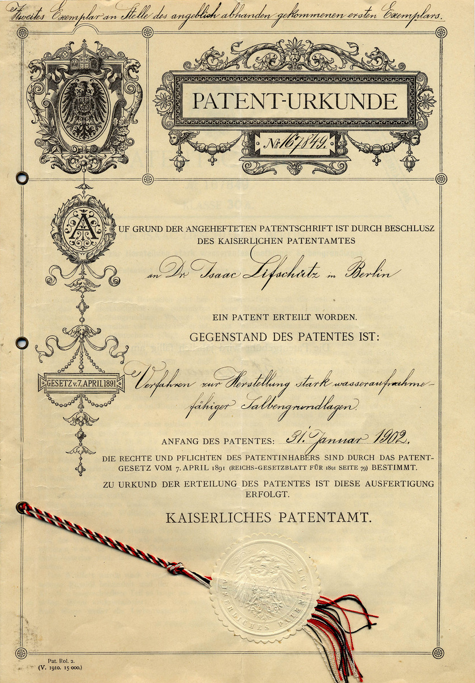
Eucerin Patent, 1902

In 1911, Oscar Troplowitz, who took over the Beiersdorf company from its founder Paul C. Beiersdorf in 1890, bought the patent and a few years later the first Eucerin products (iodine creme, loose powder) were introduced on the German market.

In the 1980s the brand was launched by Beiersdorf affiliates globally, including the USA. Since 1996 the brand also offers facial care products.

=== 2026 ===
The United Kingdom's Advertising Standards Authority (ASA) banned an advert for one of Eucerin's face serums. ASA raised concerns about Eucerin's claim that its serum could make its users appear five years younger and that these claims were clinically proven. However, the study took place in a different climate to the United Kingdom. The sample included 160 people who used the serum for four weeks, then answered questions about how young they thought they looked.
