= Arthur Thost =

German physician

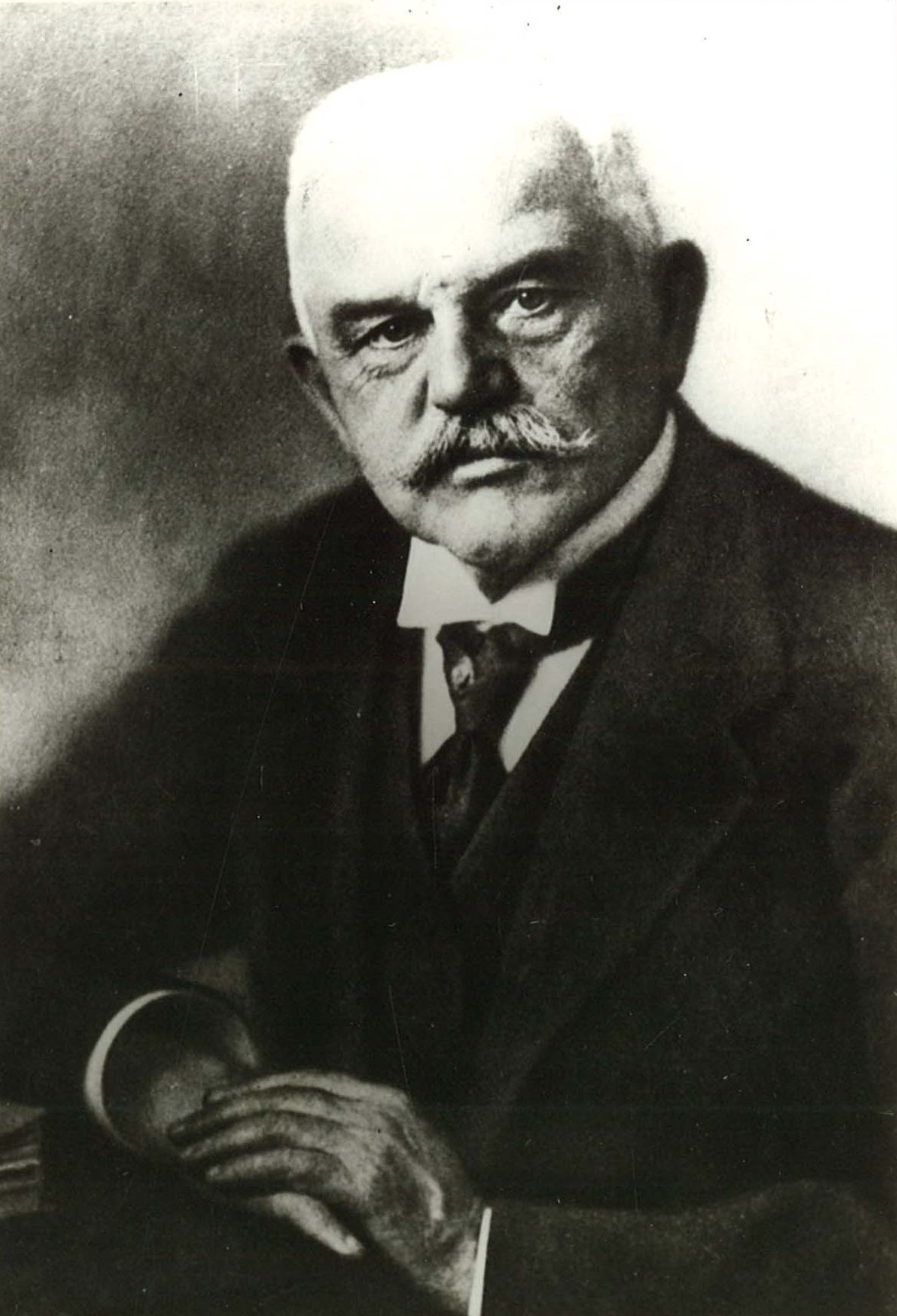
Arthur Thost

Hermann Arthur Thost (9 June 1854, in Zwickau – 22 December 1937, in Hamburg) was a German physician and otolaryngologist.

He studied medicine at several universities in Europe, receiving his doctorate at Heidelberg University in 1879. After graduation, he remained in Heidelberg as an assistant to pathologist Nikolaus Friedreich. Later on, he was associated with the General Hospital in Eppendorf, then in 1919 was appointed an associate professor of otolaryngology at the newly established University of Hamburg. He was interested in local politics, being known for his advocacy of public medical insurance.

Along with dermatologist Paul Gerson Unna, the Unna-Thost syndrome is named, a rare hereditary disorder affecting the palms and soles. He described the disease in paper titled Über erbliche Ichtyosis palmaris et plantaris cornea (1880).

== Selected works ==
- Die Verengerungen der oberen Luftwege nach dem Luftröhrenschnitt und deren Behandlungm (1911, foreword by Hermann Kümmell) – The narrowing of the upper airways after tracheotomy and its treatment.
- Der normale und kranke kehlkopf des lebenden im Röntgenbild, 1913 – The normal and diseased larynx, etc.
- Verletzungen des Ohres durch Luftdruckschwankungen, 1928 – Injuries of the ear by air pressure fluctuations.
- Der einfache Schleimhautkatarrh der oberen Luftwege und seine Behandlung – Simple mucous membrane catarrh of the upper respiratory tract and its treatment.
