= Unna's boot =

Special gauze bandage

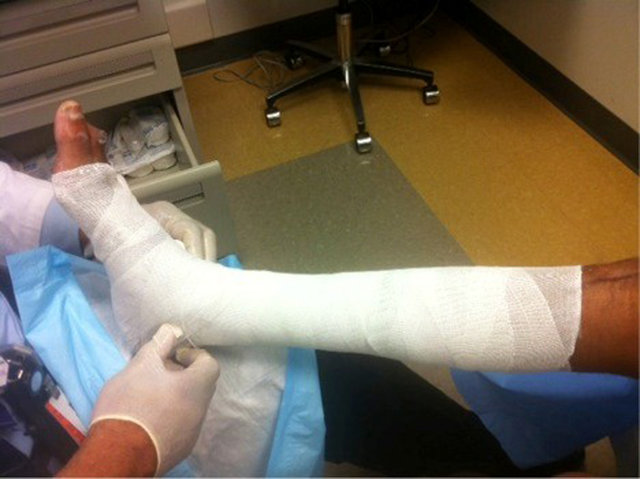
Traditional Unna's boot with multiple layers for compression

An Unna’s boot (also Unna boot) is a special gauze (usually 4 inches wide and 10 yards long) bandage, which can be used for the treatment of venous stasis ulcers and other venous insufficiencies of the leg. It can also be used as a supportive bandage for sprains and strains of the foot, ankle and lower leg. The gauze is impregnated with a thick, creamy mixture of zinc oxide and calamine to promote healing. It may also contain acacia, glycerin, castor oil and white petrolatum.

The Unna’s boot was named after German dermatologist Paul Gerson Unna.

The Unna’s boot itself is a compression dressing, usually made of cotton, that contains zinc oxide paste. The zinc oxide paste in the Unna’s boot helps ease skin irritation and keeps the area moist. The zinc promotes healing within wound sites, making it useful for burns and ulcers. Zinc oxide paste is superior to gelatins used in other dressings, because it does not harden or cake. Some Unna boots also contain calamine lotion and glycerin.

For venous stasis ulcers, the paste-impregnated wrap is covered by an elastic layer, generally an elastic wrap ("ACE" bandage) or self-adherent elastic bandage such as Coban; this is referred to as a 2-layer compression bandage. An alternative treatment is a 4-layer, graduated compression wrap (Pro-Fore is an example). Evidence indicates that both are equally effective in healing venous stasis ulcers — a slow process in the best of circumstances, often taking 2–6 months.
