= Bonne Bell =

Cosmetic Company

- Type: Private
- Industry: Cosmetics
- Founded: 1927
- Headquarters: United States
- Key people: Jesse Bell, founder
- Website: www.bonnebell.com

Bonne Bell was a cosmetics company from the United States aimed primarily at teenagers. The company was best known for its line of astringents and cleansers named "10-0-6." In the 1970s, they expanded into a popular range of lip balms called Lip Smackers which became the company's signature product.

== History ==
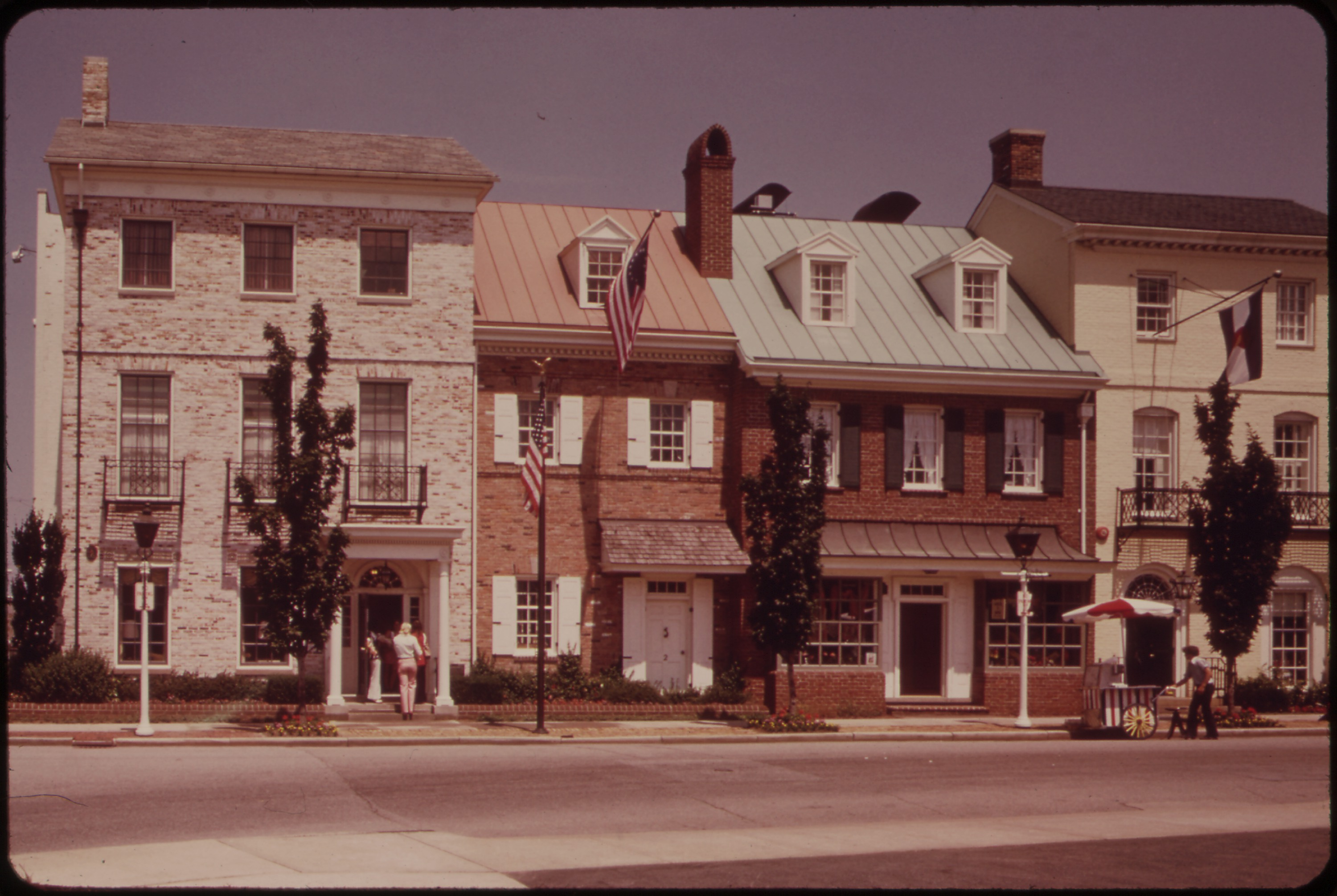
Bonne Bell's Lakewood headquarters in 1973

Bonne Bell was founded in 1927 in Lakewood, Ohio, a suburb of Cleveland, by cosmetics salesman Jesse Bell, who named it after his daughter. Bell made his products on a hot plate in his basement and then sold his skin care products door to door.

In the 1950s, the company pursued the outdoor market and developed sun blockers, heavy-duty moisturizers, and lip protectors for skiers, hikers, and joggers. In the 1960s, Bonne Bell sponsored the U.S. Ski Team and many other amateur and professional sports events. In 1972 the company sponsored 10K races in 15 cities, and many races for charity. By 1985 the business had grown into a $50 million enterprise.

In 2007 the company largely relocated to Australia in order to help grow the Australasian Brand. By 2009, the company had returned to the United States.

In January 2015, the company announced that the Bonne Bell and Lip Smackers brands would be acquired by Markwins International, though Bonne Bell will continue to distribute other brands in Europe, Asia, and Australia under the name Bell Family Brands. In accordance, the company also announced the partial closure of its headquarters effective March 2015.

== Lip Smackers ==
In 1973, Bonne Bell introduced a flavored lip pomade called "Lip Smackers" aimed originally at skiers then later at pre-teens and teens once they caught on to the trend. The first flavors launched were strawberry, green apple, and orange chocolate.

In 2014, Swarovski partnered with Lip Smacker to produce three of their biggies, a larger version of a normal Lip Smacker, covered in over five hundred Swarovski crystals. The Swarovski Lip Smacker biggies are priced at $250 each, making them the most expensive lip product compared to the likes of MAC or Lancôme. In 2015, Buddy Bell sold the family brands, Lip Smacker and Bonne Bell to Markwins International.

== Formula 10.0.6 (Brand) ==
Formula 10.0.6 is an American skincare brand established in 1933, with origins in the Bonne Bell cosmetics company founded by Jesse Grover Bell. Originally developed to address oily and blemish-prone skin, the brand became known for its accessible skincare products and straightforward approach to cleansing and complexion care.

The brand has remained associated with the Bell family across four generations, sharing its heritage with other well-known cosmetics brands, including Bonne Bell and Lip Smacker. Over the decades, Formula 10.0.6 expanded its product range to include facial cleansers, toners, moisturizers, masks, and targeted skincare treatments, incorporating botanical ingredients alongside established skincare formulations.

In 2026, Formula 10.0.6 began a new phase of development, undertaking a relaunch under the name Ten-0-Six. Spearheaded by Jesse Grover Bell's great-granddaughter, the initiative places renewed emphasis on naturally derived ingredients, simplified formulations, and the brand's longstanding skincare heritage. The relaunch aims to introduce the historic brand to a new generation of consumers while maintaining its original commitment to effective, accessible skincare.

The initiative represents a continuation of the Bell family's involvement in the cosmetics industry, combining more than 90 years of brand history with a contemporary focus on ingredient transparency and botanically inspired skincare.
