= Labello =

German brand of lip balm stick

- Product type: Personal care
- Current owner: Beiersdorf AG
- Country: Germany
- Introduced: 1909; 117 years ago
- Markets: Worldwide
- Website: www.labello.com

Labello is a brand of lip balm stick. It is produced by Beiersdorf AG in Germany and Austria. The labello lip care sticks are also sold under the name Labello Nivea, Liposan and Nivea Lip Care. Labello makes lip care products that are used for medical treatments, moisturizing, protection from sun or solely for cosmetic purposes.

The word "labello" comes from the Latin words "labium" ('lip') and "bellus" ('beautiful').

== History ==
In 1909, Dr. Oscar Troplowitz created a lip caring balm. The brand was introduced in Germany and later in Switzerland and Austro-Hungary. Then, the products were sticks wrapped in paper that had to be applied with a finger. In 1911, a new sliding case made of tin was introduced. This turned out to be a rather successful approach. During the First World War, the shortage of the tin resources caused the production of tin packaging to be stopped. However, refills that could be inserted in the existing tubes were available in the market.

In 1922, the packaging was replaced with a light aluminium stick, which made it easier for the consumer to carry it around. This was also a success. By 1935, Labello was made available in markets of over thirty countries. During the Second World War, Labello products were again in extremely short supply as aluminum was almost unobtainable until the end of the war.

In 1953, a plastic sleeve replaced the metal one, which had been used for more than 30 years. In 1958, Labello started to make products for use by men as well. A practical twist mechanism was added in 1963, making application easier. This was apparently the most successful product launch in the history of the Labello brand.

In 1973, the 'Labello Classic' in blue casing was introduced which is produced even today. In 1978, the brand released 'Labello Med' that provided treatment for severe lip problems. A year later, 'Labello Sun' was introduced which provided protection of lips from harmful sun rays. In 1984, another product, 'Labello Camomile' was made available in market. This was the first time the brand made a product containing natural flavors and ingredients. Two years later, 'Labello Rosé' was also released. In 1989, 'Labello Sport' was introduced for physically active consumers who wanted lip care.

In 1992, 'Lip Balance' series were released for consumers wanting immediate moisturizing for their lips. The series consisted of two products: 'Labello Hydro', which is still used today and 'Labello Regeneration'. The later of which was the first product in the brand to be released in a squeezable tube packaging. Two years later, 'Labello UV Alpin' was made available that provided care for lips in winter and cold weathers. In 1999, the brand launched 17 different fruit flavored lip pomades for the first time including 'Apricot Cream', 'Lemon Twist', 'Manadarin Vanilla', 'Orange', 'Sweet Melon' and 'Tropical Shake' among others. Today's assortment includes 'Cherry', 'Strawberry','Pomegranate' and 'Pink Guava'.

In 2001, a lip balm and gloss, 'Labello Pearl & Shine', was introduced for women. This marked the first time the brand took a turn into the cosmetics direction. Three years later, 'Care Gloss & Shine' lip gloss range were introduced in the market. These were available in trendy colours and as well as a transparent gloss. In 2009, Labello celebrated their 100 years by launching a limited edition of 'Labello Classic'.

== Product line ==
=== Care range ===
- Classic/Classic Care (1973–present: )
  - 3 Limited Editions

+ Classic 100 years

- Med/Med Care/Med Protection (1978–present)
- SOS/Med SOS/SOS Lip Balm
- Sun/Sun Care (1979–present)
- Sport/Active/Active Care/For Men (1989–present)
- Hydro/Moisture/Hydro Care (1992–present)
- Regeneration/Rejuvenation Q10 (1992–present)
  - Lip Effect Q10
- UV Alpin/Extreme Alpin (1994–present)
- Lipbalance/Intensiv Balance (discontinued)
- Sensitive/Sensitive Care
- Natural Volume

=== Flavored range ===
- Ananas/Pineapple (discontinued)
- Apricot/Apricot Cream (discontinued)
- Camomile/Kamille/Camomile and Calendula (discontinued)
- Cherry/Fruity Shine Cherry (1999–present)
- Dragonfruit/Fruity Shine Dragonfruit (discontinued)
- Grapes (discontinued)
- Green Apple (Grüner Apfel) (discontinued)
- Himbeere (raspberry) (discontinued)
- Juicy Fantasy/Juicy Splash (discontinued)
- Lemon Twist (discontinued)
- Lime and Orange (discontinued)
- Mandarin Vanilla (discontinued)
- Mango
- Menthol/Mint/Mint and Minerals
- Milk and Honey
- Olive and Lemon
- Orange (discontinued)
- Passion Fruits (discontinued)
- Peach
- Pink Grapefruit (discontinued)
- Pink Guava
- Peppermint Flamingo (discontinued)
- Pomegranate/Fruity Shine Pomegranate
- Rose/Rosé/Soft Rosé/Velvet Rosé (1986–present)
- Strawberry/Fruity Shine Strawberry (1999–present)
- Summer Fruits (discontinued)
- Sweet Melon (discontinued)
- Tropical Shake (discontinued)
- Vitamin Power (discontinued)
- Vitamin Shake: ACAI & WILD APPLE
- Vitamin Shake: CRANBERRY & RASPBERRY
- Fruity Shine: Peach
- Fruity Shine: Watermelon

=== Gloss range ===
- Pearl & Shine (2001–present)
  - 4 Limited Editions
- Gold & Shine (discontinued)
- Angelstar/Angel Star
- Care Gloss & Shine (till 2009)
  - Lovely Red
  - Mocca (discontinued)
  - Natural
  - Angle Star
  - Pure Natural
- Glamorous Gloss series (2009–present)
  - Natural
  - Pink Sugar
  - Ruby Red

=== Other ===
- Good Night Kiss (discontinued)
- Light Kiss (2009–present)
- Repair and Beauty (2012-present)

== Gallery ==
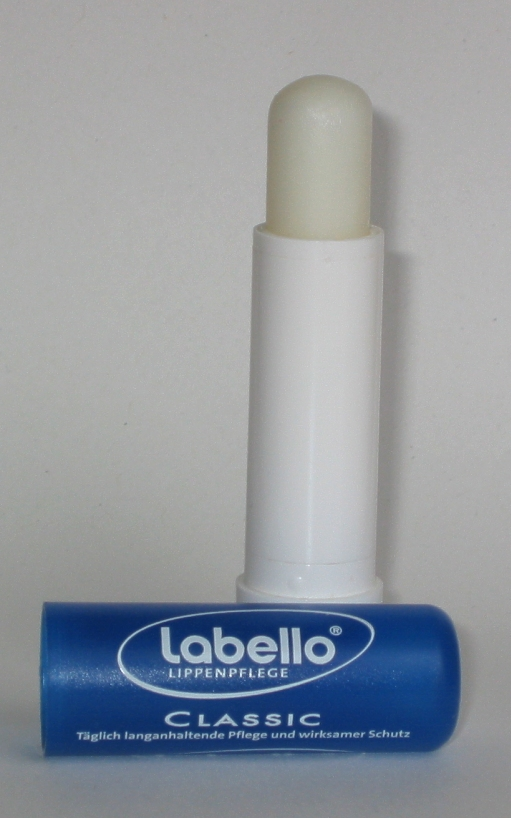
Labello Classic

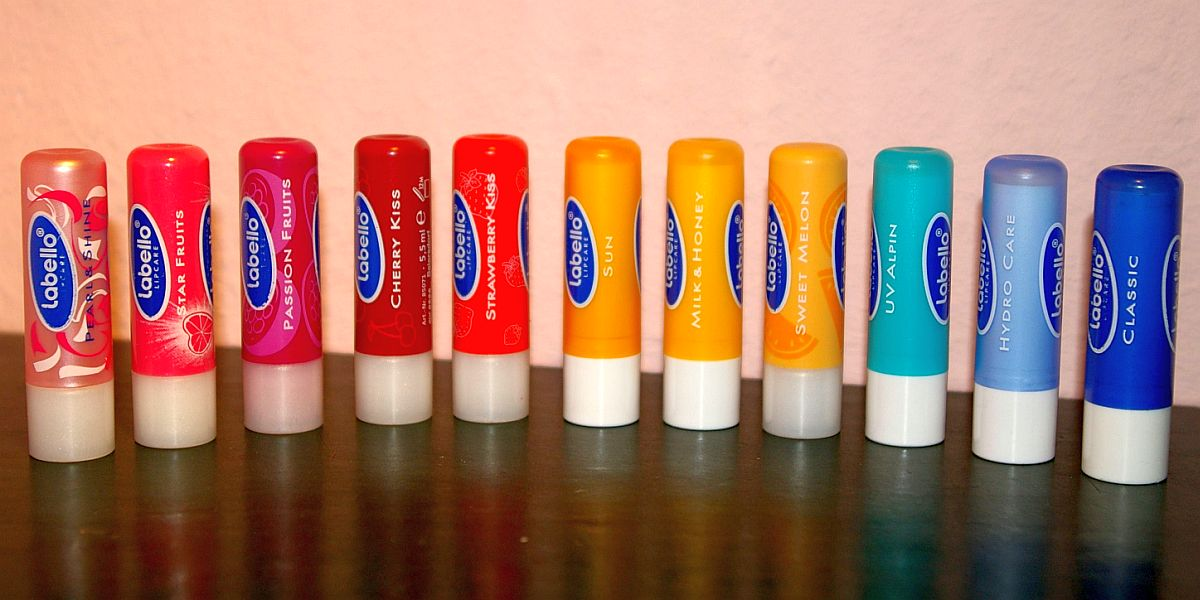
Many products under the Labello brand
