= Carmex =

Brand of lip balm

- Product type: Lip Balm
- Produced by: Carma Laboratories, Inc.
- Country: United States
- Introduced: 1937
- Markets: Australasia, Europe, North America, Scandinavia, Africa, Asia
- Tagline: "Let's Take Care of That" "It soothes. It heals. It protects."
- Website: www.mycarmex.com

Carmex, headquartered in Franklin, Wisconsin, is a lip balm brand produced by Carma Laboratories, Inc. It is sold in jars, sticks, and squeezable containers.

== History ==
Carma Laboratories, Inc. was founded in 1937 in Wisconsin by Alfred Woelbing. After experimenting with his products, Woelbing created his own line of lip balm and other cosmetic products. After experimenting with his products, Woelbing created Carmex on his family's stove top. He began by selling the product from the trunk of his car. During this time Woelbing and his wife poured their lip balm into the now well-known yellow-capped jars. In 1957, the family business moved out of the kitchen and into a rented facility in the Milwaukee suburb of Wauwatosa.

Woelbing's son Don joined the business in 1973, and introduced assembly lines to Carma Labs. In 1975, due to the product's success, a new production facility was built in the southwest suburb of Franklin; production at the same facility continues to the present day. It remains under the ownership of the founding family.

Carma Labs began producing the product in squeezable tubes in 1988. In 1989, it began producing it in stick form which had been the longtime form factor for ChapStick and Blistex, Carma's major competitors in the lip balm market.

Alfred died in 2001 at age 100. The company continued its expansion under the management of Alfred's son, Don, and grandsons, Paul and Eric. In 2002, mint-flavored Carmex lip balm (SPF 30) joined original Carmex lip balm in the product line, and Carmex lip balm became available throughout North America, Australia, Europe, Asia and Africa. During 2006, Carma introduced the DailyCare Carmex with SPF 15.

== Ingredients ==
In the United States, the active ingredient of Carmex lip balm is white petrolatum (45.30%). The inactive ingredients, in order of greatest used to least used in the product, are lanolin, beeswax, cetyl esters, paraffin, cocoa butter, camphor, menthol, salicylic acid, phenol, vanilln, and flavor. However, this formula varies slightly around the world. The use of phenol in cosmetics is prohibited in the European Union.

Salicylic acid is a non-steroidal anti-inflammatory drug (NSAID) almost identical to aspirin. In fact, aspirin's mechanism of action as an NSAID results from it being metabolized into salicylic acid. It is often incorrectly thought to be a drying agent; however, this is not true. Salicylic acid works as a keratolytic, comedolytic, and bacteriostatic agent, causing the cells of the epidermis to shed more readily, opening clogged pores and neutralizing bacteria within, preventing pores from clogging up again by constricting pore diameter, and allowing room for new cell growth.
