= EOS (company) =

American skincare company

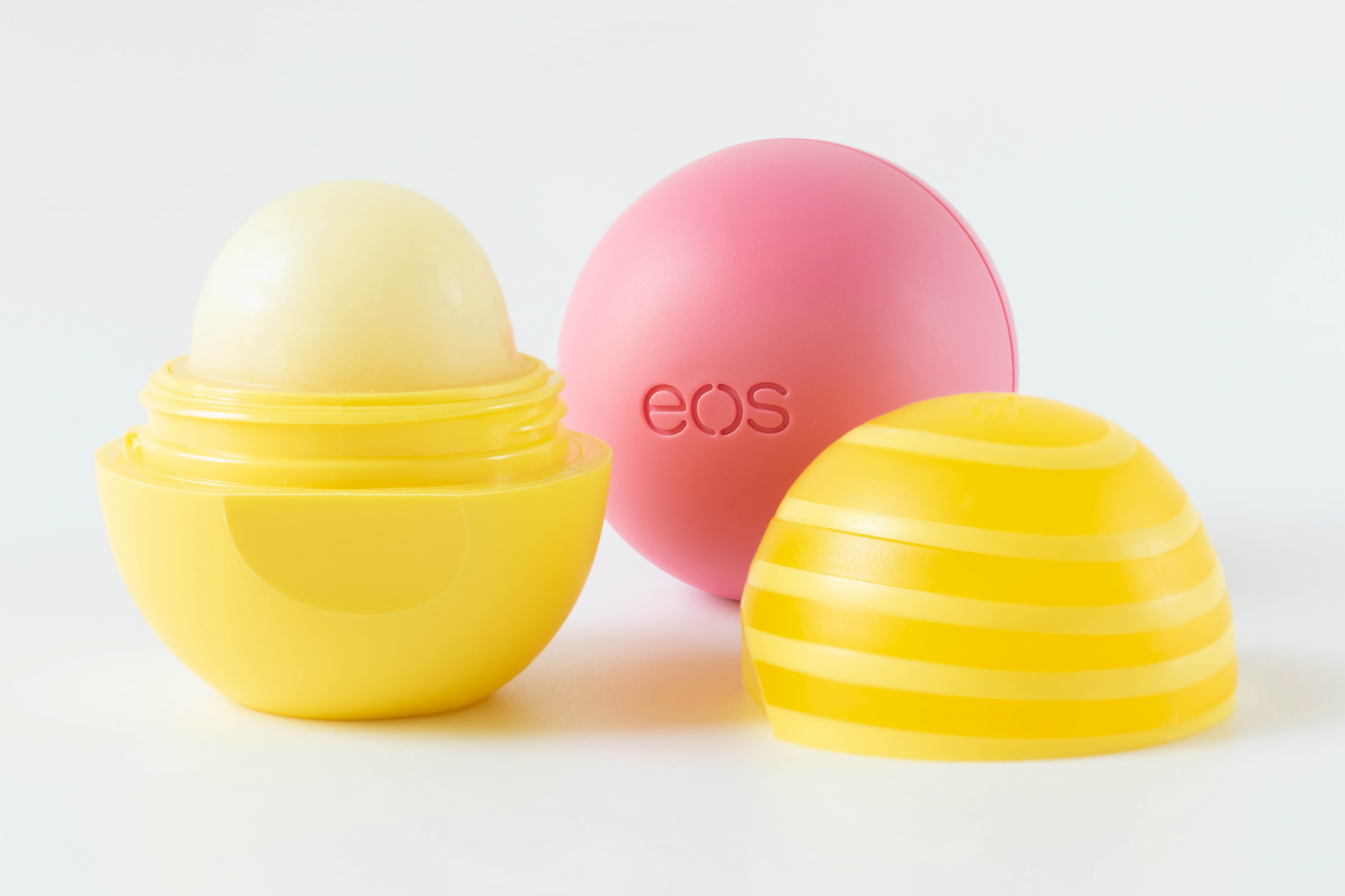
- Industry: Skincare
- Founded: 2007
- Founders: Jonathan Teller; Sanjiv Mehra; Craig Dubitsky
- Headquarters: New York City, U.S.
- Products: Lip balm, body lotion, shaving cream/oil, body mists/wash.
- Website: evolutionofsmooth.com

Evolution of Smooth (EOS) is a privately owned beauty and skincare company based in New York City. EOS was founded in 2007 by Jonathan Teller, Sanjiv Mehra, and Craig Dubitsky. The company makes a variety of body care products such as lip balm, lotion, and shaving cream. Its products are known for using natural and organic ingredients, as well as for their colorful, minimalist packaging.

== History ==
Jonathan Teller created the EOS lip balm in 2006. In 2015, EOS was reported to be the second highest-selling lip care in the world, with an estimated 11.5% of the market share in the United States at the time. The lip balms are sold at retail stores in 18 countries and online through the company's website.

In 2017, EOS sold nearly 2 million units per week globally.

== Controversy ==
Between August 6, 2014, and June 12, 2017, 126 complaints were filed to the U.S. Food & Drug Administration (FDA) by customers who experienced reactions to EOS lip balm.

In 2016, a class-action lawsuit was filed against EOS, claiming that the lip balm caused bleeding and blistering. The preliminary settlement for those affected was a reimbursement with products, cash, or more depending on their reactions to the product. According to Buzzfeed News reports, “Affected consumers are eligible to receive either $75 for verified medical expenses, a $15 cash award, $20 worth of EOS products, or up to $4,000 depending on their injuries."

Ultimately, EOS settled five proposed class action lawsuits. The final terms of the proposed EOS class action settlement were not disclosed, however, the company said it would include a warning on the lip balm packaging and the product website.

The company later published on social media that its products are safe to use, claiming their products are "hypoallergenic, dermatologist tested, made with the highest quality ingredients, meet or exceed all safety and quality standards set by our industry and are validated by rigorous safety testing conducted by independent labs". The company also placed safety tips on its packaging to warn consumers of potential irritation.

== Marketing ==
EOS products are known for using natural and organic ingredients as well as for their colorful, minimalist packaging and design targeted toward women. In its early days, EOS relied on endorsements from celebrities, such as Kim Kardashian and Miley Cyrus, who frequently posted about EOS products on social media. Consequently, Goldman Sachs included EOS in its list of top 50 brands "It Girls" love.

In March 2018, EOS launched an advertising campaign that provided free lip balm to customers of Kellogg's Special K products.
