= Charles Browne Fleet =

American pharmacist, inventor

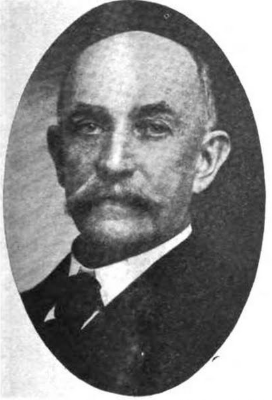
Charles Browne Fleet

Charles Browne Fleet (September 18, 1843 – May 12, 1916) was an American pharmacist and inventor of the laxative and chapstick. His company, C.B. Fleet, was founded in Lynchburg, Virginia, and still operates producing laxatives, douches, micro-enemas, and other products of the sort.

A native of King and Queen County, Virginia, Fleet studied at Columbian College until the advent of the American Civil War, at which point he enlisted in the Confederate Army. He then moved to Charlottesville, Virginia, living there for a time before moving to Lynchburg. He served as Secretary of the Virginia Pharmaceutical Association for twenty-three years.
