= Aquaphor =

Brand of skin care ointments

- Product type: Skin protectant ointment
- Current owner: Beiersdorf AG
- Introduced: 1925; 101 years ago
- Website: Official website

Aquaphor is a brand of over-the-counter (OTC) skin care ointments manufactured by Beiersdorf Inc., an affiliate of Beiersdorf AG.

The brand was introduced in the United States in 1925. In accordance with the Food and Drug Administration's OTC Skin Protectant Monograph, Aquaphor contains 41 percent petrolatum (petroleum jelly) as its active ingredient. It is used to temporarily protect minor cuts, scrapes, and burns, as well as chapped or cracked skin. The product line includes ointments for compounding, general skin therapy, lip repair, and baby care.

Aquaphor is used and recommended by health care professionals for minor post-operative wounds or defects.

== History ==
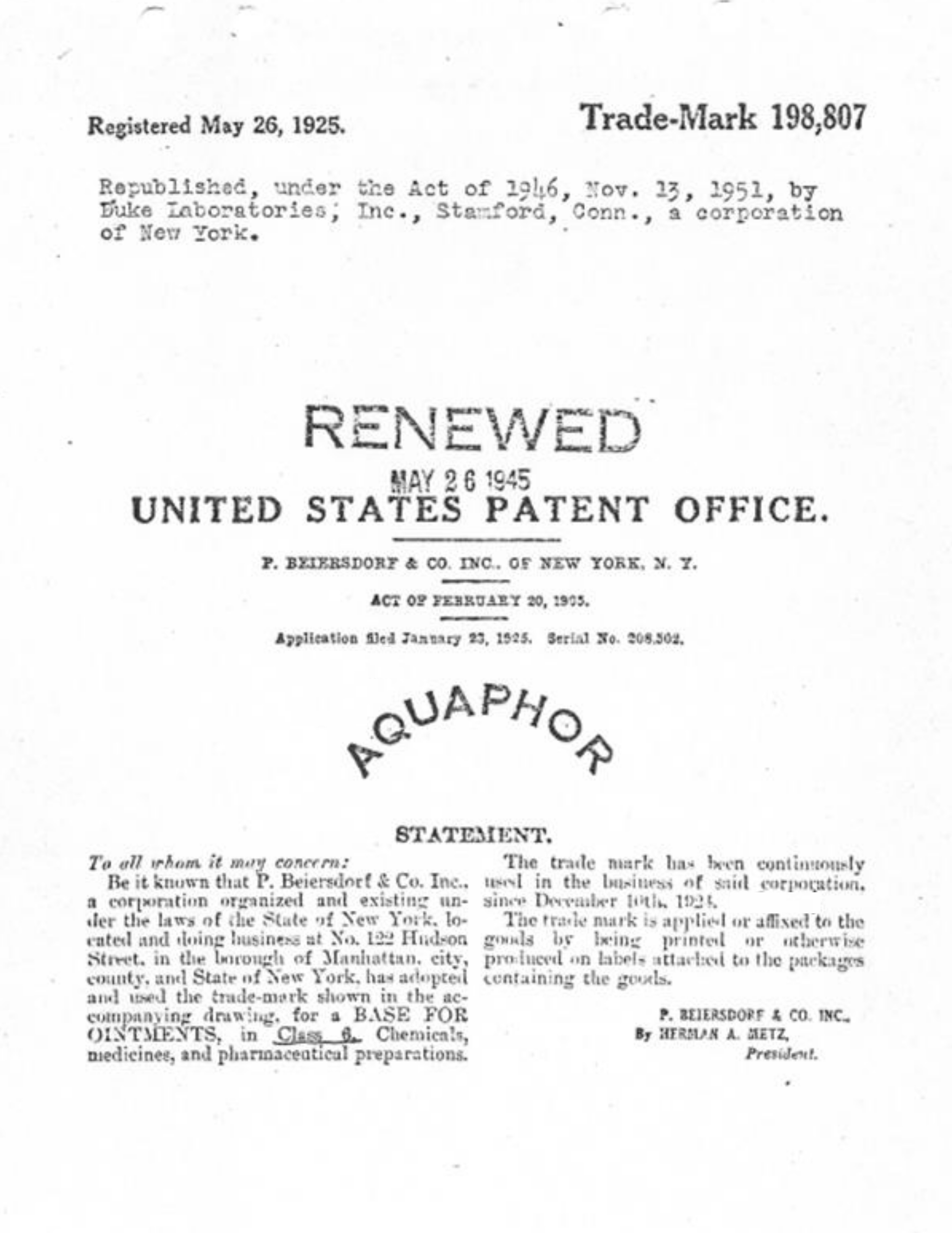
First US trademark for "Aquaphor", dated 26 May 1925

Aquaphor was developed in 1925 in the United States laboratories of Beiersdorf Inc. It was trademarked that year by Herman A. Metz, the company's president. In 1929, Beiersdorf sold the Aquaphor trademarks to Duke Laboratories to facilitate manufacturing in the country.

In 1936, Aquaphor's first product offering was sold to doctors, pharmacists and hospitals in 5 lb. containers. Production was discontinued during World War II but resumed by Duke Laboratories in 1960. At that time, 1 lb cans and 2 oz tubes were sold to medical professionals. Beiersdorf repurchased the trademarks from Duke Laboratories in 1973.

In 1982, the product was sold directly to consumers for the first time. The formulation was expanded in 1991 with the launch of "Advanced Therapy Healing Ointment", an addition to the original ointment. Beiersdorf further expanded the brand in the early 2000s, introducing baby products in 2003 and a lip repair line in 2011. In 2012, the brand launched globally in 25 other countries. In 2013, Aquaphor achieved the Good Housekeeping Seal.

== Properties and ingredients ==
In a study funded by Aquaphor's parent company, it was found that their "Healing Ointment" product was associated with (but did not cause) decreased redness around the wound but did not perform better than other products clinically.

Aquaphor is not comedogenic and does not contain any fragrances, preservatives, or dyes.

Unlike Vaseline (100% petrolatum), which is occlusive, Aquaphor (41% petrolatum) claims to form a semi-occlusive barrier on the skin. This theoretically enables the transmission of water and oxygen, which is important for wound healing and the formation of a protective moist healing environment. However, no studies have been conducted using this brand to test these healing claims.

=== Key ingredients ===
- Petrolatum: An active ingredient and OTC skin protectant, petrolatum forms an occlusive barrier on the skin and helps retain moisture.
- Mineral oil: A colorless, odorless, light oil, commonly obtained as a highly refined derivative of crude oil. Baby oil is a perfumed variety of mineral oil.
- Ceresin: A wax derived from the purification of the natural wax ozokerite.
- Lanolin alcohol: A subfraction of lanolin (wool wax) which imparts emulsifying and emollient properties. It is composed of cholesterol, other sterols, and free fatty acids. Moisturizers containing Cholesterol and fatty acid mixtures have been shown to provide skin benefits. Since this ingredient is sourced from wool from animals, this product is not suitable for vegans or vegetarians.
- Glycerin: A humectant that attracts and binds moisture in the stratum corneum, helping to keep it hydrated. It is commonly used as a moisturizing agent in lotions, creams, and cosmetics. Most glycerin used in products in the U.S. comes from animals. If it is natural glycerin, it will typically be labeled ‘plant derived’.
- Panthenol: Also known as pro-Vitamin B5. When applied topically, it has humectant properties and conditions the skin.
- Bisabolol: Derived from the Chamomile plant, bisabolol can have anti-inflammatory, anti-pruritic and healing effects.

== See also ==
- Vaseline
