= Lypsyl =

Lip balm brand

Lypsyl is a brand of moisturising lip balm owned by Lornamead. Marketing rights in the UK and Ireland are owned by Alliance Pharma since 2013. It is packaged in a small, cylindrical, twist action tube and is applied like a lipstick.

Lypsyl moisturiser comes in six varieties, namely Original, Peach, Strawberry, Lemon, Cherry, and Mint. There is also Lypsyl Sun, with a sun protection factor of 35 to protect lips from sun damage and Lypsyl Cold Sore Cream and Gel to treat and soothe cold sores.

Lypsyl is distributed in many countries, including Scandinavia and the UK. It is designed to protect, moisturize, and repair chapped or damaged lips, and to keep them hydrated and soft.

== Composition ==
Each Lypsyl lip balm contains Aloe vera and vitamin E.

A tube of Lypsyl Original is composed of the following: petroleum, paraffin, glyceryl stearate SE, paraffinum liquidum, zinc oxide, tocopheryl acetate, Aloe barbadensis, and "aroma".

A tube of Lypsyl Strawberry is composed of petrolatum, paraffin, glyceryl stearate, paraffinum liquidum, polysorbate 65, water, aroma, zinc oxide, tocopheryl acetate, Aloe barbadensis, citric acid, sodium saccharin, methylparaben, CI 16255, propylparaben, and CI 47005.
