= Paul Beiersdorf =

German pharmacist

Paul Carl Beiersdorf
- Born: 26 March 1836
- Died: 17 December 1896 (aged 60)
- Occupation: Pharmacist

Paul Carl Beiersdorf (26 March 1836 – 17 December 1896) was a German pharmacist from Neuruppin, Brandenburg. He was founder of Beiersdorf AG in Hamburg.

== Life ==
In 1880 he founded the Beiersdorf Company, a Hamburg pharmaceutical operation where he had close business ties to dermatologist Paul Gerson Unna. In 1882 Beiersdorf developed and patented a new type of medical plaster called Guttaperchapflastermulle (gutta-percha plaster gauze). The date of patent specification, 28 March 1882, is considered to be the founding date of Beiersdorf AG.

In 1890 he sold the company to pharmacist Oscar Troplowitz, who retained the company's name of "Beiersdorf". Today, Beiersdorf AG is a multi-national corporation that is based in Hamburg, and manufactures personal care products.
