= Paul Gerson Unna =

German physician and dermatologist (1850–1929)

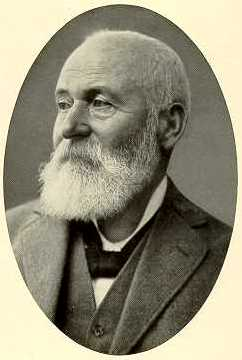
Paul Gerson Unna

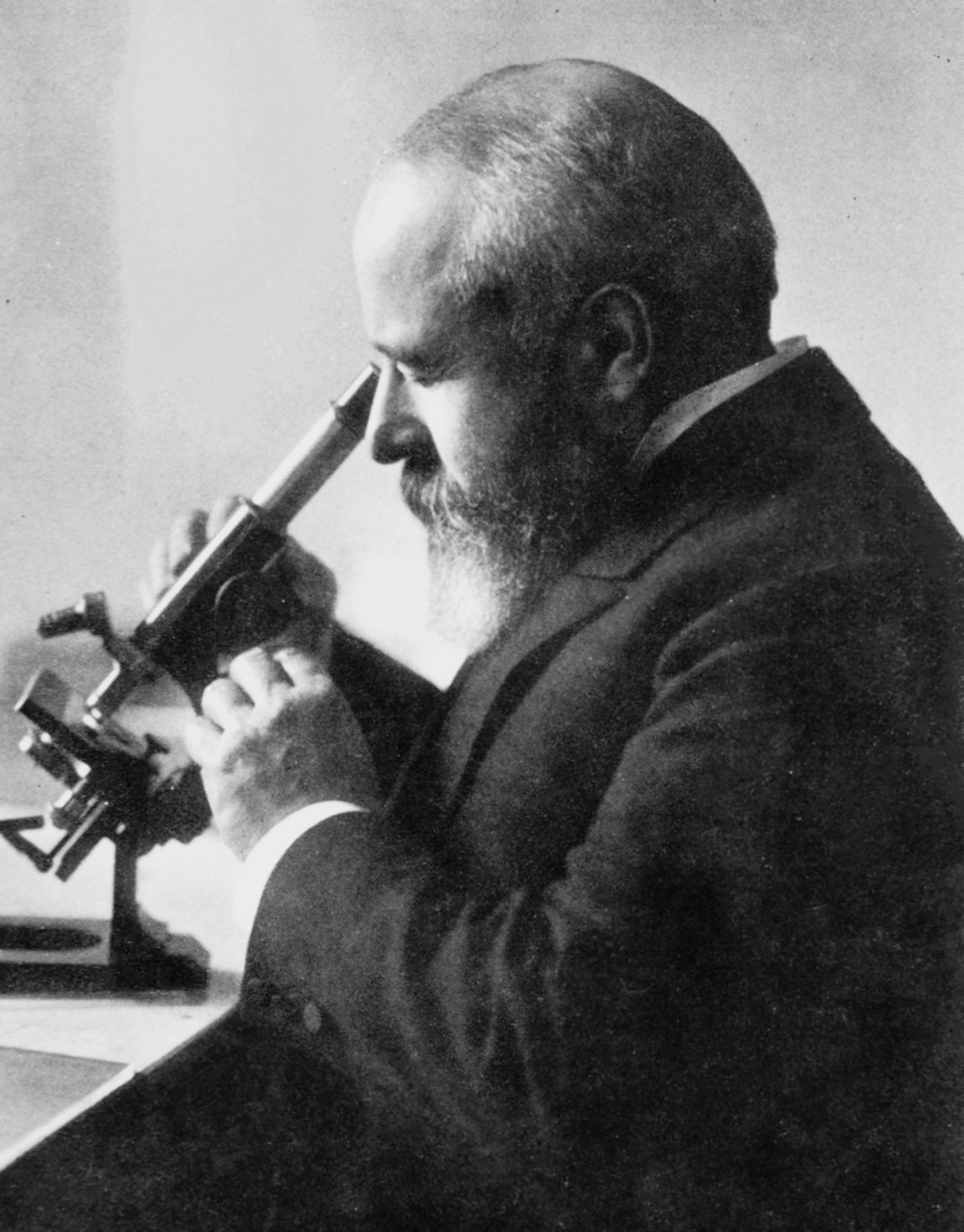
Paul Gerson Unna

Paul Gerson Unna (September 8, 1850, Hamburg – January 29, 1929, Hamburg) was a German physician specialized in dermatology and one of the pioneers in dermatopathology.

== Biography ==
Paul Unna was born to German Jewish parents Moritz Adolph Unna, a physician from Hamburg who was educated at the Gelehrtenschule des Johanneums and Ida Gerson, who descended from a long line of physicians. He began to study medicine at the University of Heidelberg, but had to interrupt it in order to fight in the Franco-Prussian War, where he was severely wounded. In 1871, he resumed his studies in Heidelberg and later went to the University of Leipzig, finally attaining a doctorate under Heinrich Wilhelm Waldeyer in Strasbourg. His doctoral work was on the subject of the histology and development of the epidermis, and was published in 1876. The thesis contained a set of new ideas and aspects that were met with hard criticism. They were accepted only after some corrections were made.

He went on to receive his training in dermatology in Vienna, where he worked in cooperation with Ferdinand von Hebra, Moritz Kaposi and Heinrich Auspitz, among others.

After his return to Hamburg, Unna started working in the clinical practice of his father, then in the Sankt Georg Hospital. Unna's main interest resided on dermatology: he opened his own practice for skin diseases in Hamburg in 1881, and later opened the Dermatologikum private dermatological hospital in Hamburg Eimsbüttel, so that he could concentrate entirely on the field, beginning in 1884. In that year, Unna published his first book, Histopathologie der Hautkrankheiten (Histopathology of Skin Diseases), which exposed the entire knowledge in the field at that time and which made him one of the most prominent dermatologists of his time. Besides describing all known skin diseases, Unna proposed new therapies. Among the innovations, in 1886 he proposed the use of ichthyol and resorcinol against skin diseases.

He coined the term acanthosis nigricans in 1889.

He investigated the biochemical processes of the skin and was the first to describe the stratum granulosum. In 1894 he introduced layer projection as a method for skin investigations.

In 1907 he received the title of professor from the Hamburg senate, and in the following year he became the chief physician of the Eppendorf hospital. In 1919 he became a professor at the University of Hamburg, receiving the first chair for dermatology.

In 1927 he described for the first time what was to be called Unna's disease, a chronic disease of the skin with seborrhea of the scalp and of the areas in the face and trunk that are rich in sebaceous follicles. Along with Arthur Thost, Unna–Thost syndrome is named after Unna; it is a rare hereditary skin disease affecting the soles and palms. Also, a compression gauze used to treat venous leg problems is named Unna's boot.

== Legacy ==
For many years Unna cooperated closely with the pharmacist Paul Beiersdorf. The street in Hamburg where the Beiersdorf company is located is named Unnastrasse in his honor.
