= Lanolin =

Yellow waxy substance secreted by the sebaceous glands of wool-bearing animals

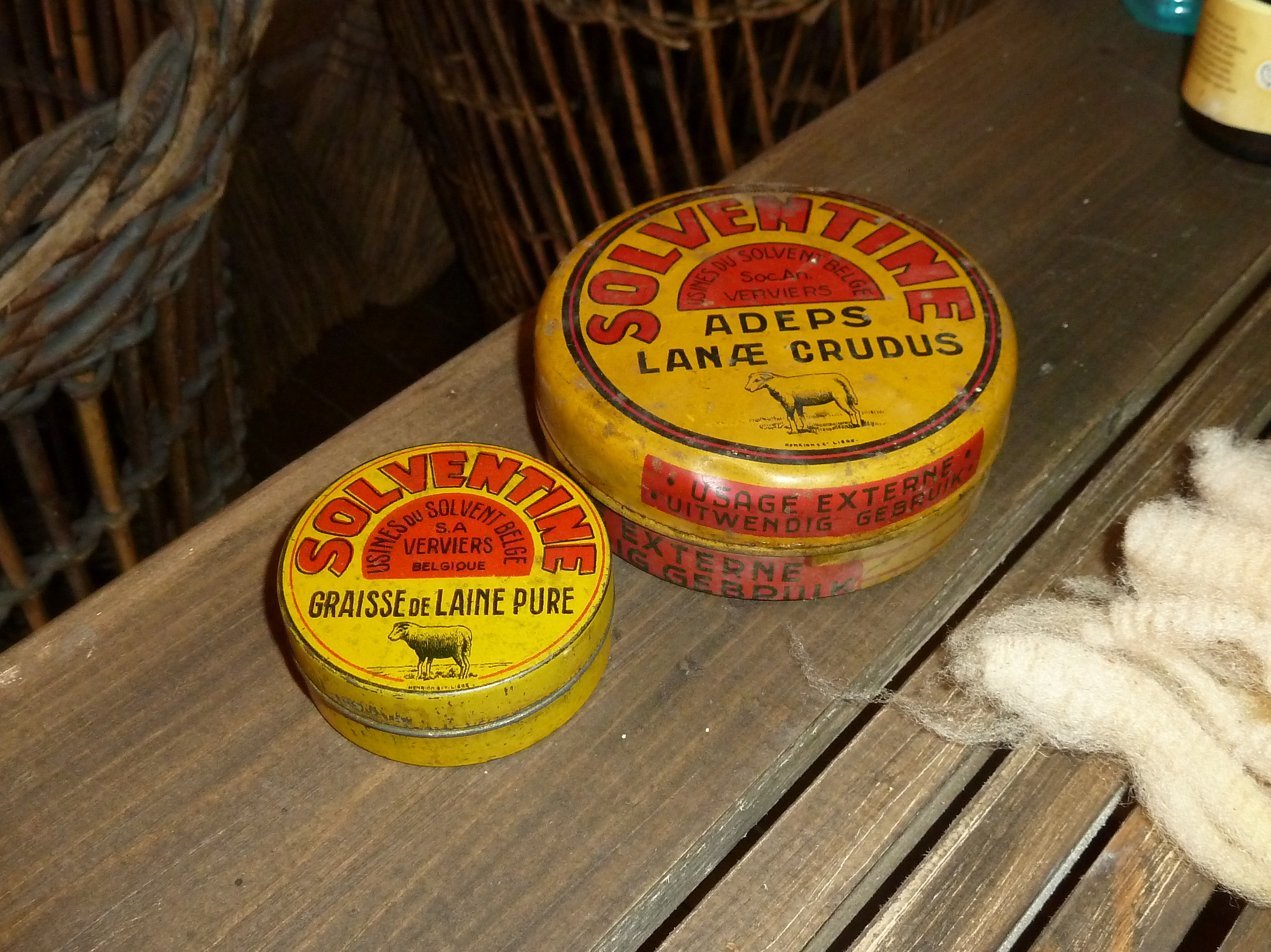
Wool fat tin (adeps lanae), at the Centre touristique de la Laine et de la Mode in Verviers, Belgium

Lanolin (from Latin lāna 'wool' and oleum 'oil'), also called wool fat, wool yolk, wool wax, sheep grease, sheep yolk, or wool grease, is a wax secreted by the sebaceous glands of wool-bearing animals. Lanolin used by humans comes from domestic sheep breeds that are raised specifically for their wool. Historically, many pharmacopoeias have referred to lanolin as wool fat (adeps lanae); however, as lanolin lacks glycerides (glycerol esters), it is not a true fat. Lanolin primarily consists of sterol esters instead. Lanolin's waterproofing property aids sheep in shedding water from their coats. Certain breeds of sheep produce large amounts of lanolin.

Lanolin in nature protects wool and skin from climate and the environment; it is also involved in skin (integumental) hygiene. Lanolin and its derivatives are used in the protection, treatment, and beautification of human skin.

== Composition ==
A typical high-purity grade of lanolin is composed predominantly of long chain waxy esters (approximately 97% by weight) with the remainder being lanolin alcohols, lanolin acids and lanolin hydrocarbons.

An estimated 8,000 to 20,000 different types of lanolin esters are present in lanolin, resulting from combinations between the different lanolin acids and alcohols; about 200 acids and 100 alcohols had been identified by 1986.

In addition to being useful itself, lanolin's complex composition of long-chain esters, hydroxyesters, diesters, lanolin alcohols, and lanolin acids makes it a starting point for the production of a whole spectrum of lanolin derivatives with wide-ranging chemical and physical properties. The main derivatisation routes include hydrolysis, fractional solvent crystallisation, esterification, hydrogenation, alkoxylation and quaternisation. Lanolin derivatives obtained from these processes are used widely in both cosmetics and skin treatment products.

Hydrolysis of lanolin yields lanolin alcohols and lanolin acids. Lanolin alcohols are a rich source of cholesterol, an important skin lipid, and are powerful water-in-oil emulsifiers; they have been used extensively in skincare products for over 100 years. Approximately 40% of the acids derived from lanolin are alpha-hydroxy acids (AHAs). The use of AHAs in skin care products has attracted much attention. Details of the AHAs isolated from lanolin can be seen in the table below.

Type of lanolic acid	Carbon chain length	Number identified
Alpha-hydroxy normal	C_{13}–C_{24}	12
Alpha-hydroxy iso	C_{13}–C_{23}	6
Alpha-hydroxy anteiso	C_{12}–C_{24}	7

== Production ==
Crude lanolin constitutes about 5–25% of the weight of freshly shorn wool. Wool from one Merino sheep produces about 250–300 ml (9–11 imp fl oz; 8–10 US fl oz) of recoverable wool grease. Lanolin is extracted by washing the wool in hot water with a special wool-scouring detergent to remove dirt, wool grease (crude lanolin), suint (sweat salts), and anything else stuck to the wool. The wool grease is continuously removed during this washing process by centrifuge separators, which concentrate it into a waxlike substance which melts at approximately 38 °C (100 °F).

== Applications ==
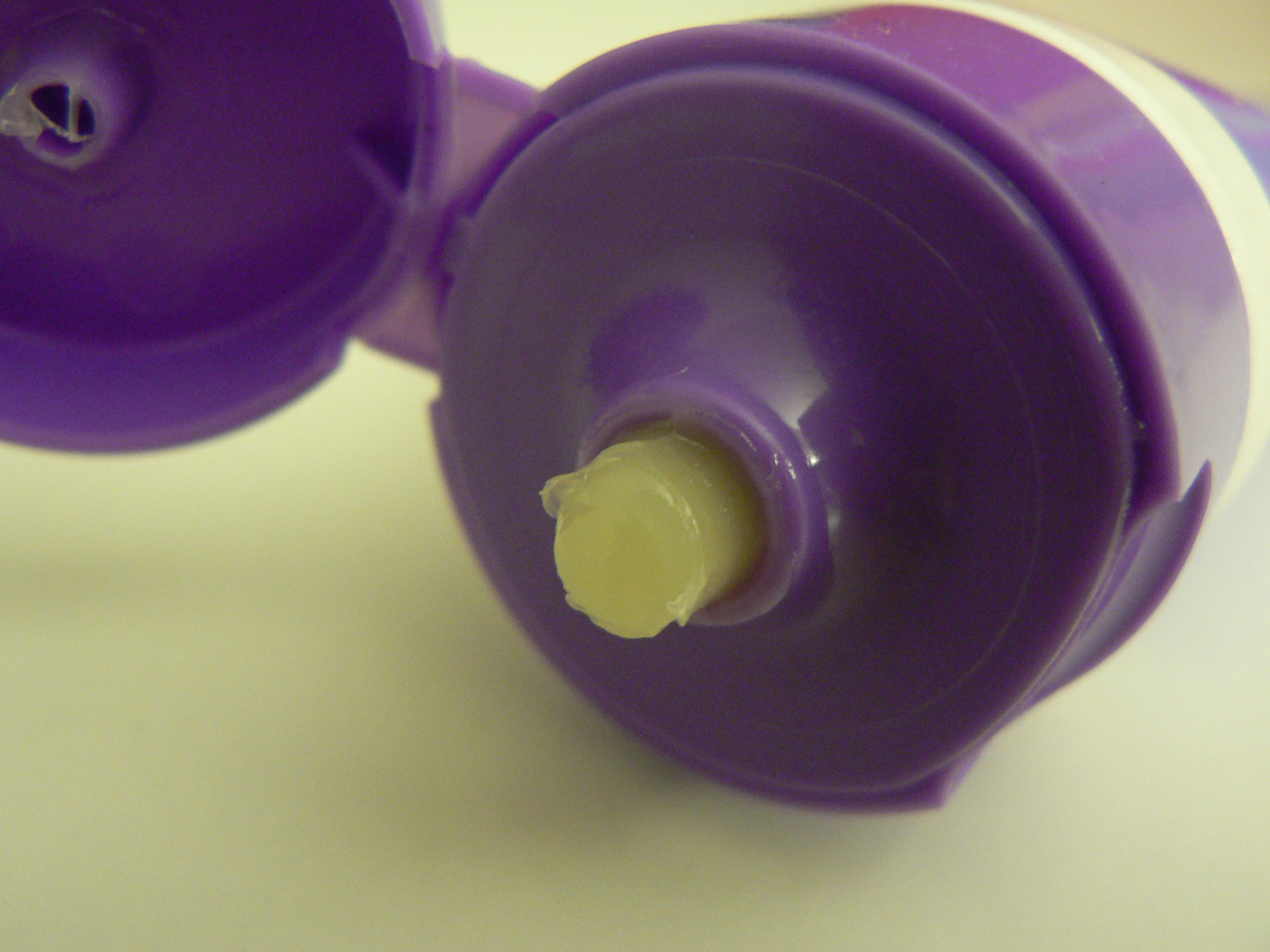
Lanolin ointment

Lanolin and its many derivatives are used extensively both for personal care (e.g. cosmetics, facial cosmetics, lip products) and healthcare (topical liniments). Lanolin is also used in lubricants, rust-preventive coatings, shoe polish, and other commercial products.

Lanolin is a relatively common allergen, causing what is often misunderstood as a wool allergy. However, allergy to a lanolin-containing product is difficult to pinpoint, and often different forms of lanolin may not cause an allergic reaction in the same person. Patch testing can be done if a lanolin allergy is suspected.

It is frequently used in protective baby skin treatment. It is also used for sore nipples from breastfeeding, but health authorities recommend alternative methods first, including nipple cleaning, improving baby positioning, and ultimately expressing milk by hand. Lanolin is reported to have soothing properties, but there is a lack of research.

Lanolin is used commercially in many industrial products ranging from rust-proof coatings to lubricants. Some sailors use lanolin to create slippery surfaces on their propellers and stern gear to which barnacles cannot adhere. Commercial products (e.g. Lanocote) containing up to 85% lanolin are used to prevent corrosion in marine fasteners, especially when two different metals are in contact with each other in the presence of saltwater. The water-repellent properties make it valuable in many applications as a lubricant grease where corrosion would otherwise be a problem.

7-Dehydrocholesterol from lanolin is used as a raw material for producing vitamin D_{3} by irradiation with ultraviolet light.

Baseball players often use it to soften and break in their baseball gloves—shaving cream with lanolin is popularly used for this.

Anhydrous liquid lanolin, combined with parabens, has been used in trials as artificial tears to treat dry eye. Anhydrous lanolin is also used as a lubricant for brass musical instrument tuning slides.

Lanolin can also be applied to woollen garments to make them water- and dirt-repellent, such as for cloth diaper covers.

Lanolin is used in lip balm products such as Carmex. It can irritate the lips of some people.

Lanolin is sometimes used by people on continuous positive airway pressure therapy to reduce irritation with masks, particularly nasal pillow masks that often create sore spots in the nostrils.

Lanolin is a popular additive to moustache wax, particularly 'extra-firm' varieties.

Lanolin is used as a primary lubricating component in aerosol-based brass lubricants when reloading ammunition. It is mixed warm 1:12 with ethanol, usually about 99% pure, which acts as a carrier which evaporates quickly after application, leaving a thin film of lanolin which protects against brass seizing in resizing dies.

Lanolin is used as a lubricant for leather and fur, and in polishes and protective coatings for shoes and leather goods.

Lanolin, when mixed with ingredients such as neatsfoot oil, beeswax and glycerol, is used in various leather treatments, for example in some saddle soaps and in leather care products.

== Standards and legislation ==
In addition to general purity requirements, in the US lanolin must meet official requirements for permissible levels of pesticide residues. The Fifth Supplement of the United States Pharmacopoeia XXII published in 1992 was the first to specify limits for 34 named pesticides. A total limit of 40 ppm (i.e. 40 mg/kg) total pesticides was stipulated for lanolin of general use, with no more than 10 ppm of any individual pesticide.

A second monograph also introduced into the US Pharmacopoeia XXII in 1992 was entitled 'Modified Lanolin'. Lanolin conforming to this monograph is intended for use in more exacting applications, for example on open wounds. In this monograph, the limit of total pesticides was reduced to 3 ppm total pesticides, with none present at over 1 ppm.

In 2000, the European Pharmacopoeia introduced pesticide residue limits into its lanolin monograph. This requirement, which is generally regarded as the new quality standard, extends the list of pesticides to 40, and imposes even lower concentration limits.

Some very high-purity grades of lanolin surpass monograph requirements. New products obtained using complex purification techniques produce lanolin esters in their natural state, removing oxidative and environmental impurities resulting in white, odourless, hypoallergenic lanolin. These ultra-high-purity grades of lanolin are ideally suited to the treatment of dermatological disorders such as eczema and on open wounds.

Lanolin attracted attention owing to a misunderstanding concerning its sensitising potential. A study carried out at New York University Hospital in the early 1950s had shown that about 1% of patients with dermatological disorders were allergic to the lanolin used at the time. By one estimate, not differentiating between the general healthy population and patients with dermatological disorders exaggerated the sensitising potential of lanolin by 5,000–6,000 times.

The European Cosmetics Directive, introduced in July 1976, contained a stipulation that cosmetics which contained lanolin should be labelled to that effect. This ruling was challenged immediately, and in the early 1980s, it was overturned and removed from the directive. Despite only being in force for a short period of time, this ruling did harm both to the lanolin industry and to the reputation of lanolin in general. The Cosmetics Directive ruling only applied to cosmetics, not to the many hundreds of lanolin's different uses in dermatological products for the treatment of compromised skin conditions.

Modern analytical methods have revealed lanolin possesses a number of important chemical and physical similarities to human stratum corneum lipids; the lipids which help regulate the rate of water loss across the epidermis and govern the hydration state of the skin.

Cryogenic scanning electron microscopy has shown that lanolin, like human stratum corneum lipids, consists of a mass of liquid crystalline material. Cross-polarised light microscopy has shown the multilamellar vesicles formed by lanolin are identical to those formed by human stratum corneum lipids. The incorporation of bound water into the stratum corneum involves the formation of multilamellar vesicles.

Skin bioengineering studies have shown the duration of the emollient (skin smoothing) action produced by lanolin is very significant, and lasts for many hours. Lanolin applied to the skin at 2 mg/cm^{2} has been shown to reduce roughness by about 35% after one hour and 50% after two hours, with the overall effect lasting for considerably more than eight hours. Lanolin is also known to form semiocclusive (breathable) films on the skin. When applied daily at around 4 mg/cm^{2} for five consecutive days, the positive moisturizing effects of lanolin were detectable until 72 hours after final application. Lanolin may achieve some of its moisturizing effects by forming a secondary moisture reservoir within the skin.

The barrier repair properties of lanolin have been reported to be superior to those produced by both petrolatum and glycerol. In a small clinical study conducted on volunteer subjects with very dry (xerotic) hands, lanolin was shown to be superior to petrolatum in reducing the signs and symptoms of dryness and scaling, cracks and abrasions, and pain and itch. In another study, a high-purity grade of lanolin was found to be significantly superior to petrolatum in assisting the healing of superficial wounds.
