= List of Unilever brands =

This is a list of brands owned by the British multinational consumer goods company Unilever.

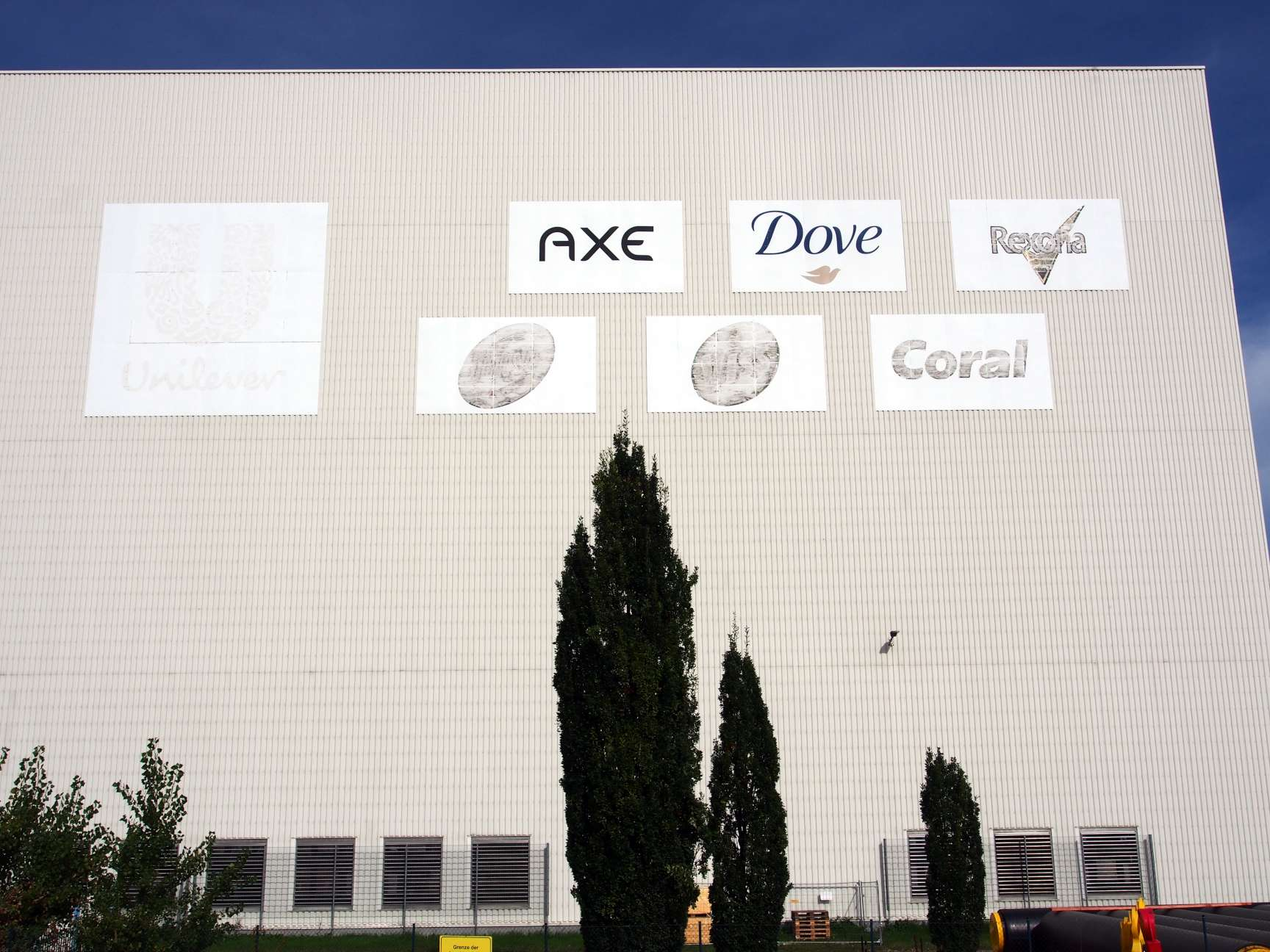
Warehouse with logos of AXE, Dove, Rexona, Viss, Domestos, Coral

== Food and drink ==
=== Condiments and extracts ===
- Amino – food products (Poland)
- Amora – French mayonnaise and dressings (France, Belgium and Morocco)
- Aromat – seasoning (South Africa, Sweden, Switzerland, Netherlands)
- Best Foods – mayonnaise, sandwich spreads, peanut butter and salad dressings
- Beseda – tea bags (Russia)
- Bovril – beef extract
- Brooke Bond – tea bags (India, Nepal, Indonesia)
- Calvé – sauces, ketchup, mustard, mayonnaise, peanut butter (Italy, Netherlands, Spain)
- Chirat – pickled vegetables (pickled onions, pickled cucumbers, pickled mixes), sauces (top down in the squeeze bottles, sachets, glass jars and glass bottles), vinegars and salad dressings (Kressi), olives, mustard (top down in the squeeze bottles, sachets), capers and corn on the cob, mayonnaise (top down in the squeeze bottles, tubes, sachets), tomato ketchup (top down in the squeeze bottles, sachets) (Switzerland)
- Colman's – mustard, condiments, packet sauces, OK Fruity Sauce (UK)
- Continental – side dishes (Australia, New Zealand)
- Fanacoa – mayonnaise, mustard, ketchup (Argentina and for export to Latin America)
- Fruco – ketchup, mayonnaise and condiments (Colombia)
- Globus – mayonnaise, mustard, ketchup and condiments (Hungary)
- Hellmann's – mayonnaise, ketchups, mustard, sauces, salad dressings
- Kecap Bango – sweet soy sauce in Indonesia
- Kissan – ketchups, squashes and jams (India)
- Knorr (Knorr-Suiza in Argentina, Royco in Indonesia and Kenya, Continental in Australia, outside Japan) – sauces, stock cubes, ready-meals, meal kits, ready-soups, frozen food range
- Kuner – mayonnaise (top down in the squeeze bottles, sachets, glass jars, tubes), sauces (top down in the squeeze bottles, sachets, glass jar) (Austria)
- Lady's Choice – mayonnaise, peanut butter and sandwich spreads (Philippines, Malaysia)
- Kystee – seasoning, drinks and foods (Philippines)
- Lao Cai – seasoning
- Maille – French mustard
- Marmite – yeast extract spread (except in Australia and New Zealand, called Our Mate)
- Robertson's – spices/seasoning (South Africa)
- Royco – stock cubes, non-MSG stock (Indonesia, Kenya)
- Saga – tea bags (Poland, Czech Republic, Hungary, Slovakia, Estonia, Latvia, Lithuania)
- Salsa Lizano – Costa Rican condiment
- Sir Kensington's – ketchup, mustard, mayonnaise, ranch, vinaigrettes (US, Canada)
- Slotts – mustard (Sweden)
- Tortex – ketchup (Poland)
- Turun sinappi – mustard (Finland/Sweden)

=== Other foods ===
- Bagel Bagel – pretzels/snacks (Israel)
- Knorr (Knorr-Suiza in Argentina and Mexico, Royco in Indonesia and Kenya, Continental in Australia) – sauces, stock cubes, ready-meals, meal kits, ready-soups, frozen food range (except Japan)
- Kuner – mayonnaise (top down squeeze bottles, sachets, glass jars, tubes), sauces (top down in the squeeze bottles, sachets, glass bottles) (Austria)
- Kefli – snacks (Israel)
- Klik – candy (Israel)
- Maizena – cornstarch
- Mãe Terra – Brazilian natural and organic food business
- Chirat – pickled vegetables (pickled onions, pickled cucumbers, pickled mixes), sauces (top down squeeze bottles, sachets, glass jars and glass bottles), vinegars and salad dressings (Kressi), olives, mustard (top down squeeze bottles, sachets), capers and corn on the cob, mayonnaise (top down squeeze bottles, tubes, sachets), tomato ketchup (top down squeeze bottles, sachets) (Switzerland)
- Patit – crackers (Israel)
- Pfanni – German potato mixes (Germany)
- Pot Noodle – cup noodle
- Pot Rice – instant rice
- Sealtest – milk products
- Telma – breakfast cereal (Israel)
- Unilever Food Solutions – professional markets (food service)

=== Beverages ===
- Boost – malted milk powder (India, acquired from GlaxoSmithKline)
- Brooke Bond — tea (India, Nepal, and Indonesia)
- Bru – instant coffee (India)
- Buavita – fruit juice (Indonesia, acquired from Ultrajaya)
- Horlicks – malted milk powder (outside the UK, acquired from GlaxoSmithKline)
- Jif – lemon and lime juice
- Liquid I.V – food supplement for hydratation
- T2 Ice tea

== Home care ==
- All – laundry detergent (except the United States)
- Ala – laundry detergent (Argentina and North/Northeast Brazil)
- Baba (East Europe)
- Badin – fabric softener (Israel)
- Bailan – detergent (Taiwan)
- Biotex – laundry detergent
- Breeze – laundry detergent (Philippines [discontinued in 2003 and reintroduced in 2013], Singapore, Malaysia and Thailand)
- Blueair – air purification systems
- Brilhante – laundry detergent (Brazil)
- Cif – cleaning products (Jif in Australia, New Zealand and the Middle East; Viss in Germany)
- Coccolino – softener (Hungary, Italy, Croatia, Poland, Romania) (Yumoş in Turkey)
- Comfort – fabric softener
- Coral / Korall – laundry detergent
- Domestos (Vim in Bangladesh, Canada, India, Pakistan and Vietnam; Domex in the Philippines, India, Pakistan and Sri Lanka) – bleach (Australia, Bulgaria, Czech Republic, France, Germany, Hungary, Indonesia, Israel, Italy, Poland, Romania, Russia, South Africa, Spain, Turkey and the United Kingdom)
- Deja – laundry detergent (Ecuador)
- Dero – laundry detergent (Romania)
- Dixan – laundry detergent (Italy)
- Lysoform – home care (Italy)
- Minerva – laundry and dishwasher detergents (Brazil)
- Molto – fabric softener (Indonesia)
- Neutral – laundry detergent
- Omo (Australia, Switzerland, Liechtenstein, Vietnam, South Africa, Morocco, The Netherlands, Norway, Brazil, Turkey and Chile) – laundry detergent
- Persil – this brand name is primarily operated by Henkel, but Unilever owns the rights to use the Persil name in Malaysia, Singapore, Ireland, the United Kingdom, France and New Zealand. It sells its own premium detergents under this brand, based on the Omo formula. They are not the same formulation as Henkel's Persil products, although they may occupy the same market position.
- Quix – dishwashing liquid (Chile)
- Radiant – laundry detergent (Australia and New Zealand)
- Rin – laundry detergent (India, Bangladesh, Pakistan)
- Rinso (except the United States)
- Robijn – fabric softener and laundry detergent (Netherlands)
- Skip – laundry detergent
- Snuggle – fabric softener (South Korea and Taiwan)
- Sun – dishwasher detergent
- Sunlight (discontinued in the Philippines in 2001 as laundry detergent and reintroduced in 2015 as dishwashing liquid)
- Super Pell – floor cleaning fluid (Indonesia)
- Surf – laundry detergent (worldwide) and fabric conditioner (Philippines only)
- Surf Excel – laundry detergent (India, Pakistan, Bangladesh and Sri Lanka)
- Via – dishwasher detergent (Sweden)
- Viso – laundry detergent (Vietnam and Indonesia)
- Vixal – porcelain cleaner (Indonesia)
- Wheel – detergent (India, Bangladesh)
- Wipol – carbolic floor cleaner (Indonesia)

== Beauty, well-being and personal care ==
- AHC
- Andrelon
- Aviance – beauty products
- Axe – deodorant, shower gel, body spray (Lynx in the UK, Ireland and Australia)
- Ayush (India)
- Baby Dove – soaps, lotions, shower gels
- Badedas – Bath & shower gels
- Block & Glow (formerly Block & White) – brightening lotion (Philippines)
- Brisk – hair-styling products for men (Southeast Asia, North America)
- Camay – beauty soap
- Citra – women's hand and body lotion, beauty soap, and scrubs (Indonesia, Thailand, Malaysia and the Middle East)
- Clear (Linic in Portugal, Ultrex in Greece) – anti-dandruff, scalp care shampoo and conditioner (China, Southeast Asia, Australia, Romania, Pakistan, Philippines, Poland, South Africa, Hungary, United States, Canada, Latin America, Turkey)
- Clinic – dandruff shampoo
- Clinic Deodorant – shampoo, deodorant, shower gel
- Close-Up – toothpaste (except the United States)
- Cream Silk – conditioner (Philippines)
- Dawn (S.A) – lotion products
- Dermalogica (USA) – skincare and spa products
- Dimension (Southeast Asia, South Asia, Middle East, North America, South America)
- Dove Men+Care – shampoo, deodorant, body sprays, shower gel
- Dove Nutritive Solutions – Oxygen & Nourishment, Straight & Silky, Hair Fall Rescue+, Intense Repair, Nourishing Oil Care
- Dove – skin care, hair care, and deodorant
- Dove Spa
- Dr. Kaufmann – sulfur soap (Philippines)
- Dusch Das – shower gels and deodorants (Germany)
- Eskinol – women's facial wash and cleanser (Philippines)
- Fissan – foot powder baby skin care products
- FDS – skin care range
- Fluocaril - toothpaste
- Gessy (Brazil) – soap
- Glow & Lovely – skin lightening product (available in India, Malaysia, Indonesia, Singapore, Brunei and Timor Leste)
- Good Morning – soap (Egypt)
- Hazeline (China, Vietnam)
- Hijab Fresh – body lotion for hijab wearers (Indonesia)
- Hourglass Cosmetics (USA)
- Indulekha Shampoo and oil
- K18 – Haircare range
- Kate Somerville Skincare – Skincare range developed by Hollywood esthetician Kate Somerville
- Korea Glow – skin care range (Indonesia)
- Lakmé cosmetics
- Lever 2000 soap
- Lifebuoy – rubbing alcohol (Philippines)/soap
- Liril - soap (India)
- Living Proof – Prestige Hair Care Brand
- Linic – dandruff shampoo (Portugal)
- Love Beauty & Planet – vegan hair and body care
- Lux – women's soap, shower gel, and lotions (Camay in the Philippines, Caress in the United States)
- Master – men's facial wash and cleanser (Philippines)
- MedCare – hospitalar hygiene products (Worldwide, launched first in Brazil)
- Melé – skincare brand targeting melanin-rich skin
- Mentadent – toothpaste (except for North America)
- Mist – soap (Egypt)
- Nameera – halal skincare range (Indonesia)
- Neutral – Hygiene products
- Nubian Herritage - personal care
- Nyakio - facial care
- Organics – shampoo and conditioner (Elida Beauty)
- Onnit – healthcare
- Paula's Choice – Clean and Clinical beauty (USA)
- Pears Transparent Soap
- Pepsodent – dental (outside of the United States) (P/S in Vietnam)
- Pinuk – body wash, shampoo, and conditioner (Israel)
- Prodent – toothpaste
- Pure Line (Middle East)
- Radox – shower gels and bubble bath
- Regenerate – toothpaste
- Rexona (Degree in the United States & Canada; Sure in the United Kingdom, Ireland and India; Shield in South Africa; Rexena in Japan) – deodorant
- Sahaja – cleaning products for Muslims (Indonesia)
- Schmidt's Naturals – deodorants and soaps
- Seventh Generation – home and personal care products including bobble
- Shea Moisture – textured hair care
- Signal – toothpaste
- Simple – skin and body care range
- SR – toothpaste
- St Ives – hand and body care
- Suave (Outside the United States)
- Sunsilk (Sedal in Spanish-speaking Latin American countries, Seda in Brazil, Elidor in Turkey; Hazeline in China) – shampoo and conditioner (discontinued in the United States and Canada in 2007)
- Tatcha – Luxury skincare brand acquired on 10 June 2019 for close to $500 million
- Thermasilk – shampoo and conditioner
- Tholl – skin care
- TRESemmé – hair care range (Argentina, Australia, Brazil, Canada, Chile, Denmark, Finland, India, Indonesia, Mexico, Norway, New Zealand, Philippines, South Africa, Spain, Sweden, Thailand, Vietnam, the United Kingdom and the United States)
- V Wash feminine wash (India; acquired from Glenmark)
- Vaseline – body lotion, shower gel, deodorant (Vasenol in Portugal, Brazil, Italy, Spain and Mexico)
- Vibrance – shampoo and conditioner
- Vim (Middle East)
- Vinólia – soap (Brazil)
- Vitakeratin – hair treatment (Philippines)
- VO5 – hair care/styling (except the United States)
- White Beauty – skin lightening cream
- Williams – men's care
- Wild – refillable deodorant
- Xedex
- Zendium – toothpaste
- Zhonghua – toothpaste (China)
- Zwitsal – baby care range (Netherlands and Indonesia)

== Former brands ==
In 2003, Unilever announced the strategic decision to sell off the Dalda brand in both India and Pakistan. In 2003, Bunge Limited acquired the Dalda brand from Hindustan Unilever Limited for reportedly under ₹1,000,000,000 (equivalent to ₹4.0 billion or US$42 million in 2026). On 30 March 2004, Unilever Pakistan accepted an offer of ₹1,330,000,000 (equivalent to ₹5.1 billion or US$53 million in 2026) for the sale of its Dalda brand and related business of edible oils and fats to the newly incorporated company Dalda Foods (Pvt.) Limited. On 16 January 2014, Unilever Philippines sold the Royal pasta brand to Philippine company RFM Corporation for around ₱2.1 billion (US$42.64 million).

In 2018, Unilever spun-off their margarine and spreads division and sold it to KKR, forming Upfield (now called the Flora Food Group). In 2021, they split a handful of 'non-core' beauty brands into a standalone unit called Elida Beauty, which they later sold to investment firm Yellow Wood Partners in 2023. Also in 2021, their tea division split into a unit called Ekaterra and sold to CVC Capital Partners. In December 2025, Unilever demerged their ice cream business into the standalone Magnum Ice Cream Company.
