= Unilever Philippines =

Regional subsidiary of the British multinational company

Unilever Philippines, Inc.
- Trade name: Unilever Philippines
- Formerly: Philippine Refining Company (1927–1993); Unilever Philippines (PRC), Inc. (1993–1997)
- Type: Subsidiary
- Industry: Consumer goods
- Predecessor: California Manufacturing Company (1955–2000) (Note: California Manufacturing Company was a joint venture between Ajinomoto and CPC International. The company was acquired by Unilever in 2000.)
- Founded: 1927; 99 years ago
- Headquarters: 7/F Bonifacio Stopover Corporate Center, 31st Street corner 2nd Avenue, Bonifacio Global City, Taguig, Metro Manila, Philippines
- Area served: Philippines
- Key people: Fredy Ong (President and CEO)
- Products: Home and personal care; Foods and beverages
- Revenue: ▲ ₱2.87 million (2024)
- Number of employees: 2,000 (2024)
- Parent: Unilever
- Subsidiaries: Unilever-RFM Ice Cream, Inc. (Note: Joint venture with RFM Corporation.)
- Website: unilever.com.ph

Unilever Philippines, Inc. is the Philippine subsidiary of British multinational consumer goods company Unilever. It is based in Bonifacio Global City, Taguig since 2016. It is a manufacturer of laundry detergents and soaps, shampoos and hair conditioners, toothpastes, deodorants, skin care products, household cleaners, and toilet soaps with an annual sales of over 40 billion pesos. It employs over 1,000 people nationally. It is the largest polluter in the Philippines.

Aside from Unilever Philippines, other Unilever subsidiaries in the country include Unilever RFM Ice Cream, Inc. (formerly, Selecta Walls, Inc.) and California Manufacturing Company, Inc. (Unilever Bestfoods).

Unilever Philippines serves as part of Unilever plc to produce, manufacture and supervise Unilever brands (like Surf, Close-Up, Clear, among others) in the Philippine market. To maintain the needs of mass production of most of the products, the company also imports Unilever products from neighboring countries such as Malaysia, Indonesia, Thailand and Vietnam.

In 2023, Fredy Ong served as the new chairman and CEO of Unilever Philippines, replacing Benjie Yap.

== History ==
Unilever Philippines, Inc. was established in 1927 as Philippine Refining Company (PRC). The company began as an oil miller which at its peak produced nearly 100,000 tons of coconut oil annually. The quickly ventured beyond oil milling - margarine production in the 1930s, non-soap detergents, shampoos and toothpaste in the 1960s and 1970s and sulphonation technology and cogeneration power plant in the 1980s. The 1990s saw the company focusing on several improvements in the environment front one of which was the introduction of the first 100% biodegradable detergent bar in the Philippines.

== Logo ==
In 1993, the company's name was formally changed from Philippine Refining Company (PRC) to Unilever Philippines (PRC), Inc., with a matching gold and platinum icon and a silver triangle to mark the name change. "Total Quality - Paglilingkod namin sa inyo" was the first tagline of the relaunched firm. In 1994, the PRC logo changed from gold and platinum to Unilever blue to denote its membership as part of the Unilever family.

Unilever changed the logo into the then large U logo used by the company's other international divisions in 1997, with a handwritten typeface and color blue icon, retaining the "Total Quality" slogan. The logo had been in use until July 2004.

The company started using the current Unilever corporate logo starting July 2004, which was designed for the company by the brand consultancy Wolff Olins. It is composed of 25 icons woven together to create a U shape.

== Marketing ==
From 1998 to 2009, almost every TV commercial of any Unilever brand has an outro with the company logo and a voiceover that says: "From Unilever." The 2004 logo originally had a slogan "Adds vitality to life" that has been in use from July 2004 to 2009. Later, the Unilever logo will appear at the upper-left or right of the screen at the end of every commercial since 2006 which are in the form of peeling from 2006 to 2012, flipping ribbon from 2011 to 2020, and upward dice since 2020.

== Brands ==
=== Current brands ===
- Axe
- Best Foods
- Block & Glow (formerly known as Block & White, acquired from Sara Lee Philippines in 2010)
- Breeze
- Cif (formerly Jif)
- Clear
- Close-Up
- Cream Silk
- Domex
- Dove
- Eskinol (acquired from Sara Lee Philippines in 2010)
- Fissan (acquired from Sara Lee Philippines in 2010)
- Knorr
- Lady's Choice
- Lifebuoy
- Lipton (joint venture with PepsiCo/Pepsi Philippines)
- Love Beauty & Planet
- Master (acquired from Sara Lee Philippines in 2010)
- Pepsodent
- Pond's
- Rexona
- Sunsilk
- Surf
- Suave
- Toni&Guy
- TRESemmé
- Unilever Pureit
- Vaseline
- Vitakeratin

=== Former brands ===
- Angel Face
- Alsa
- Blue Clinic Shampoo
- Block & White (renamed: Block & Glow since 2023 to)
- CMC
- Comfort
- Dimension Multi-V (now: Rave Multi-V from 1997 to 2001 Also Countries Asia of India)
- Dr. Kaufmann (acquired from Sara Lee Philippines in 2010)
- Impulse
- Jif (now: Cif)
- Liqui-Fresh
- Lux
- Milkrema
- Mazola
- Maizena
- Karo
- Organics
- Rave (now: Dimension 2-in-1 Vitaflex from 1996 to 2000 Also Countries Asia of Indonesia & Vietnam)
- Rinso
- Royal Pasta (sold to RFM Corporation in 2014)
- Royco
- Selecta Ice Cream (joint venture with RFM Corporation from 1999 to 2025, sold to The Magnum Ice Cream Company in 2025 now: Kwality Wall's from India)
- Signal
- Sunlight
- Superwheel
- Skippy
- Simple
- Timotei
- Tempo
- Unilever Food Solutions
- Wheel
