= Ameer Shahul =

Indian environmentalist and author

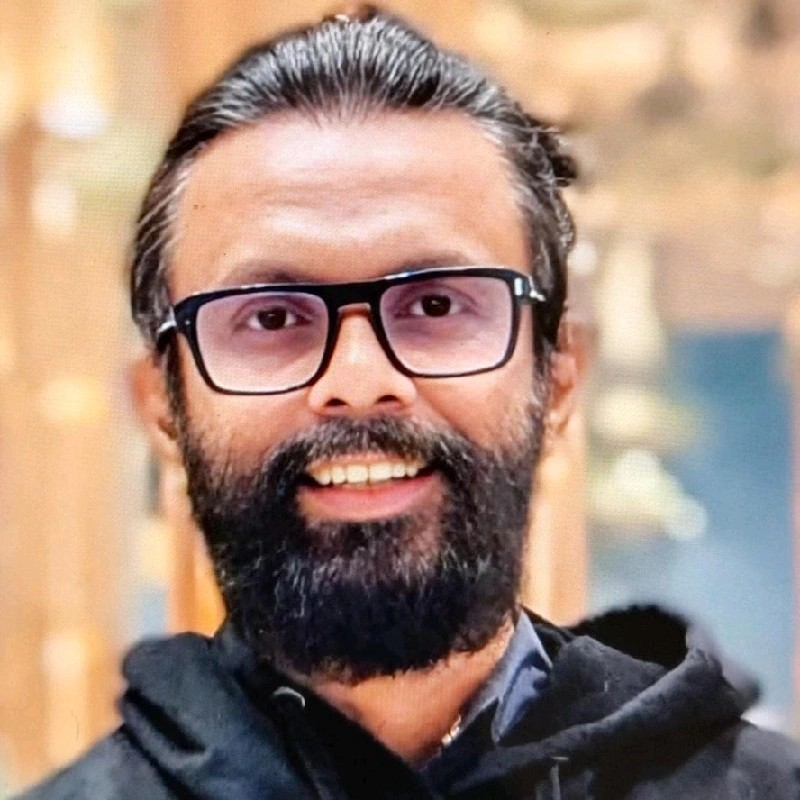
- Born: Pangode, Kerala, India
- Education: Steinbeis-Hochschule Berlin (MBA), Cochin University of Science and Technology (MSc), St John's College, Anchal, University of Kerala (BSc)
- Occupations: Author, Environmentalist
- Notable work: Heavy Metal: How a Global Corporation Poisoned Kodaikanal
- Website: www.ameershahul.com

Ameer Shahul is an Indian author and environmentalist who is known for his work against Unilever in Kodaikanal mercury poisoning. His first non-fiction book titled Heavy Metal: How a Global Corporation Poisoned Kodaikanal was published by Pan Macmillan in 2023. Heavy Metal won the '2024 Book of the Year' award from the Green Literature Festival, under the 'Green Business' category. The book was longlisted for the prestigious Tata Literature Live! Literary Awards 2023 under the Best Non-Fiction First Book category. His second book Vaccine Nation: How Immunization Shaped India (Macmillan), dealing with India's two centuries of vaccine research and vaccination journey, released in August 2025, was shortlisted for the Atta Galatta best non-fiction book award of the Bangalore Literature Festival, 2025.

His third book The Silent Syndicate: How Big Finance is Destroying India's Healthcare was published by Hachette India in July 2026.

== Environmentalist ==
Shahul worked with Greenpeace since 2002 on a campaign against mercury pollution by Unilever in Kodaikanal, industrial pollution committed by the FMCG company in the hill station of Tamil Nadu, known as Kodaikanal mercury poisoning. He led the public affairs groups and ex-workers to force the company collect 290 tonnes of mercury waste disposed in and around the factory site and send back to the United States for permanent retirement in 2003. Shahul along with campaigner Navroz Mody led environmental and local community groups in lobbying for remediation of the site, and initiated an investigation by the Department of Atomic Energy of Government of India, which found that the mercury levels in the atmosphere of Kodaikanal was up to 2640 times more than normal conditions. Shahul also led a team of activists and volunteers to spook the annual general body meeting of Hindustan Unilever in Mumbai in 2003 and 2004, raising the issue.

He campaigned against the practices of ship breaking in Indian shores for hazardous waste disposal by Western shipping industry, and against ground water exploitation and heavy metal waste dumping by Coca-Cola in Kerala known as Plachimada Coca-Cola struggle. He also brought to notice the worst incident of a state owned company continuing to manufacturing the globally banned DDT.

== Author ==
In 2023, Pan Macmillan published his book titled, Heavy Metal: How a Global Corporation Poisoned Kodaikanal. Deccan Herald described the book as 'a blunt and bold account of a tragedy', while Malayala Manorama termed it as the gripping take on an industrial tragedy, and of green resistance. Business Line described the book as 'a good pointer to be on our guard and save the environment.'

The Financial Express (India) called it a case study on corporate and regulatory failures, while The New Indian Express described it as an exceptional book that offers a comprehensive and compelling account of not just the disaster, but also its aftermath. The Indian Express described the book as a ‘crisp cinematic account of corporate greed and the struggle for justice in India.’ Open (Indian magazine) said ‘that it took Unilever more than 15 years to compensate affected workers is a reminder of the humongous costs of such mistakes’.

In 2025, Macmillan Publishers released his second book titled, Vaccine Nation: How Immunization Shaped India. The book received positive reviews from critics and public health experts. The Indian Journal of Medical Research described the book as "compelling, meticulously researched, and highly readable", praising its evidence-based and historically grounded account of vaccination in India.

The Hindu described the book as a "remarkable chronicle" of India's vaccine journey, noting that it captures the scientific, political and social forces that shaped the country's immunisation programme while making a complex subject accessible to general readers. The Financial Express described the book as "a salient contribution to public health literature in India", saying Shahul "painstakingly" documents more than a century of vaccine history and weaves it into a coherent narrative that could become a reference for policymakers, public health practitioners and students of healthcare.

Business Standard wrote that Shahul "does an admirable job of uncovering compelling" stories behind India's vaccination programme, calling the book "a fascinating portrait of a journey that has so far remained largely untold and overlooked". The book was also noted for presenting India's vaccine history through the broader themes of science, public health, ethics and nation-building.Open (Indian magazine) described Vaccine Nation as a meticulously researched chronicle of India's vaccine history that brings together science, politics and public health into a compelling narrative.

The Tribune said the book offers readers interested in the moral, historical and political underpinnings of vaccination "insight and perspective". Scroll.in wrote that the book tells "a broader story about Indian science itself", exploring how vaccine development was shaped by the intersection of health, politics and power. Indian Pediatrics described the book as a comprehensive account of India's immunisation journey in a review published in the journal. Shaastra called the book "a compelling story of how India emerged as the global hub of vaccines", praising its integration of scientific, political and historical narratives.

His third book is The Silent Syndicate: How Big Finance Is Destroying India's Healthcare, a non-fiction published by Hachette India in July 2026. The book is about the invasion of private equity and foreign investments into India's healthcare sector.

The book received multiple reviews in India. Deccan Herald called the book as a timely one cautioning the nation about the consequences of the flow of foreign capital into healthcare. Business Standard said the book was an investigation into the ownership change unfolding in India's healthcare sector and its relationship with private equity and global finance. Outlook praised the book’s reporting and said the examination of private-equity ownership histories, pharmaceutical patents, lobbying, patient-assistance programmes and healthcare data was praiseworthy.

Mint (newspaper) saw the book as an "absorbing and meticulously sourced read,” but questioned whether the evidence fully supported its conclusion that foreign capital was "destroying" Indian healthcare. Frontline (magazine) suggested that the book opened a Pandora’s box, tracing "how global private equity has turned hospitals and pharmacies into profit machines".

== Awards ==
- Heavy Metal: How a Global Corporation Poisoned Kodaikanal won the "2024 Book of the Year" award in the "Green Business" category at the Green Literature Festival Book Awards.
- Heavy Metal was longlisted for the Tata Literature Live! Literary Awards 2023 in the "Best Non-Fiction First Book" category.
- Vaccine Nation: How Immunization Shaped India was shortlisted for the Atta Galatta–Bangalore Literature Festival Book Prize 2025 in the "Best Non-Fiction" category.

== See also ==
- Kodaikanal mercury poisoning
- Plachimada Coca-Cola struggle
- Heavy Metal: How a Global Corporation Poisoned Kodaikanal
