= Vaccine Nation: How Immunization Shaped India =

2025 book by Ameer Shahul

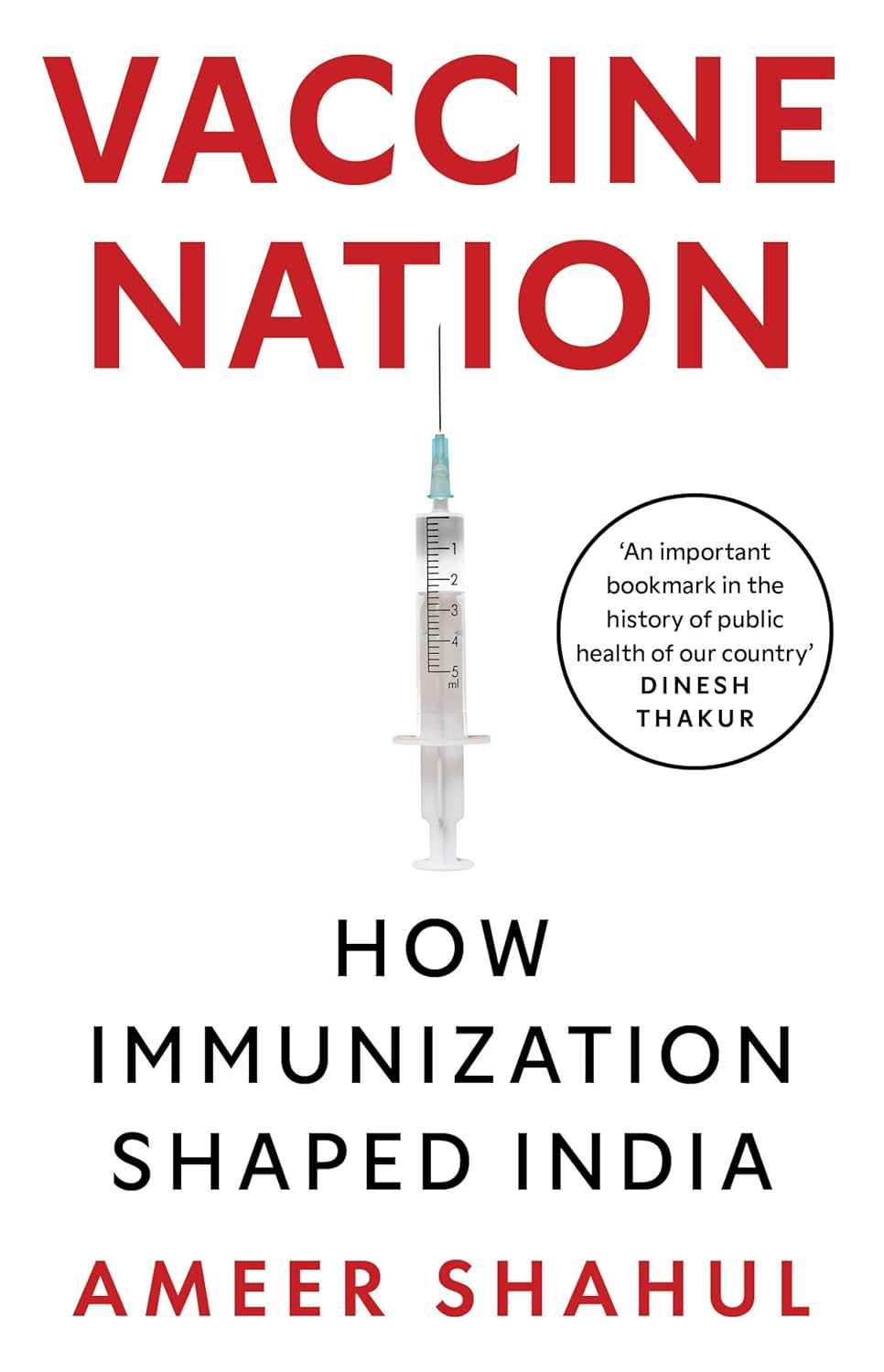
- Author: Ameer Shahul
- Language: English
- Subject: Vaccination, public health, history of medicine
- Genre: Non-fiction
- Publisher: Pan Macmillan
- Publication date: August 23, 2025
- Publication place: India
- Media type: Print (hardcover & paperback), e-book
- Pages: 478–504
- ISBN: 9789361133060

Vaccine Nation: How Immunization Shaped India is a 2025 non-fiction book by Indian author and environmentalist Ameer Shahul. Published by Macmillan Publishers, it traces the evolution of vaccine research and immunization in India, from the colonial period to the contemporary phase when the country emerged as a global vaccine manufacturing hub. The book was short-listed at the Bangalore Literature Festival, 2025 among the best non-fiction books of the year for the Atta Galatta award.

== Background ==
The book is the author's second major work after Heavy Metal: How a Global Corporation Poisoned Kodaikanal (2023), which examined Kodaikanal mercury poisoning and corporate accountability in India. The author is an Indian writer who works on public health, environment, and public policy.

== Reception ==
Vaccine Nation received positive reviews from Indian media and some academic journals. Some critics highlighted its narrative depth, research rigour, and interdisciplinary scope. The Hindu described the book as “well-researched” and priased for its ability to balance storytelling with factual accuracy, while Business Standard called it “an epic account of exciting achievements and innovation that captures a story still unfolding". The Indian Journal of Medical Research described the book as "compelling, meticulously researched, and highly readable", praising its evidence-based and historically grounded account of vaccination in India.

Some reviewers praised the book for its historical scope and its ability to connect figures and events across time.The Financial Express (India) noted that the book brings together key figures in India’s vaccine history—such as Waldemar Haffkine, Sahib Singh Sokhey, and Jacob John—within a single narrative space. The New Indian Express praised its scientific grounding and narrative clarity, and observed that it tells the untold story of India’s rise as a major producer of affordable vaccines. The Tribune (India) highlighted its relevance in the post-COVID-19 context, describing it as a valuable backstory for understanding health systems, vaccine diplomacy, and hesitancy. Open (Indian magazine) described the work as a “meticulously-researched chronicle” of India’s vaccine history and a useful resource for students and researchers.

Prominent Indian digital outlet Scroll.in noted that "Vaccine Nation" underscores how vaccine development is shaped not only by science but also by political, social, and economic forces. A review in Indian Pediatrics, journal of Indian Academy of Pediatrics described it as a “comprehensive and engaging account” of India’s immunization transformation. Indian Health Magazine Happiest Health characterised the work as extending beyond history to reflect India’s public-health ethos. Science magazine brought out by IIT Madras Shaastra termed it “a richly detailed account of India’s scientific and vaccine ecosystem.”

Excerpts from Vaccine Nation were published by Deccan Herald, Mint (newspaper), and Article-14 highlighting the book’s historical narrative and policy insights into India’s vaccine ecosystem.

In an interview with Frontline (magazine), Shahul discussed the political economy of vaccines, the role of public institutions, and the challenges of equitable access in global health systems.

== See also ==
- Vaccination
- Public health in India
- Serum Institute of India
