= The Silent Syndicate =

The Silent Syndicate: How Big Finance Is Destroying India's Healthcare'
- Author: Ameer Shahul
- Language: English
- Subject: Health policy, public health, financialisaton of health
- Genre: Non-fiction
- Publisher: Hachette
- Publication date: July 23, 2026
- Publication place: India
- Media type: Print (hardcover), e-book
- Pages: 312
- ISBN: 9357314016

The Silent Syndicate: How Big Finance Is Destroying India's Healthcare is a 2026 non-fiction book by Indian author Ameer Shahul, published by Hachette India in July 2026. The book deals with the role of global private equity and investments in India's healthcare sector.

== Overview ==
The Silent Syndicate is about the changing ownership and the growing financing patterns of India's private healthcare sector, since economic liberalisation in 1991. It explores the interests of private equity and foreign institutional investments in Indian hospitals, diagnostic centres, medical-device companies, pharmaceutical businesses, pharmacies, digital-health platforms and health insurers.

The central theme of the book is financialisation of healthcare and it also looks at how decision-making of healthcare delivery and pricing have shifted from doctors and public healthcare system to foreign investors and corporate boards. The author uses the term silent syndicate to describe what he presents as an underlying network of global financial interests influencing various segments of the healthcare system.

The book also discusses drug patents, access to expensive medicines, patient-assistance programmes and lobbying by global pharmaceutical lobbies in India. It examines the compulsory licensing dispute involving Bayer's cancer medicine Nexavar. The book also talks about medical data generated by hospitals, diagnostic laboratories, pharmacies and digital-health platforms, and poses questions about its ownership, commercial use and protection.

== Reception ==
The book received reviews in several major Indian media outlets.

In its review, Deccan Herald said the book was a timely volume cautioning the nation about the consequences of the flow of foreign capital into healthcare. Business Standard described the book as an investigation into the ownership change unfolding in India's healthcare sector and its relationship with private equity and global finance. Outlook called out the book’s reporting as one of its strengths and highlighted Shahul's examination of private-equity ownership histories, pharmaceutical patents, lobbying, patient-assistance programmes and healthcare data.

Mint (newspaper) described the book as an "absorbing and meticulously sourced read" and praised its mapping of private-equity investment across healthcare sectors. However, it also questioned whether the book's evidence fully supported its conclusion that foreign capital was "destroying" Indian healthcare. The Financial Express (India) noted that the book warns readers of "global capital circling India’s healthcare, and increasingly taking ownership, and profit becoming their top priority". The review credited Shahul with bringing these subjects together in a single account, but it questioned whether the book conclusively demonstrated the relationship asserted by its subtitle.

Frontline (magazine), in its review, suggested that the book opened the Pandora’s box of Indian healthcare, tracing "how global private equity has turned hospitals and pharmacies into profit machines". Health portal Nivarana described the book as an examination of how foreign investment has influenced hospitals, diagnostics, pharmaceuticals, medical devices and insurance.

Scroll.in and Article-14 published excerpts from the book in July 2026.

== Author ==
Ameer Shahul is an author and columnist who writes for The Hindu, The Indian Express, Deccan Herald and Frontline (magazine) The Silent Syndicate is his third book, following Heavy Metal: How a Global Corporation Poisoned Kodaikanal (2023) and Vaccine Nation: How Immunization Shaped India (2025).
