= Deepak Malghan =

Indian economist and activist (b. 1974)

Prof Deepak Malghan
- Born: 1974 (age 51–52)
- Citizenship: Indian
- Occupations: Professor, Activist
- Organisation: Indian Institute of Management, Bangalore
- Works: Citius, Altius, Fortius – History of How the World Became Efficient
- Movement: Corporate Ethics, Environment Protection
- Partner: Hema Swaminathan
- Children: 1

Professor Deepak Malghan is an Indian ecological economist, social activist and author. He advocates for business ethics and transparency at work and against environmental degradation. He is professor in public policy at Indian Institute of Management, Bangalore. He is an adjunct professor at Ashoka Trust for Ecology & Environment.

== Activism ==
Much after the Kodaikanal mercury poisoning controversy erupted and settled, Malghan wrote a letter to students of his institute in 2018 urging them to dis-invite Hindustan Unilever during campus placement, which created controversy.

Malghan has argued that social diversity at workplace can improve accountability and transparency. He accused his own institute Indian Institutes of Management of becoming elitist, and not having adequate representation from the underprivileged strata of society. He demanded changes in human resources policies at top management institutes, stating that these institutes have been misusing their autonomy for self-aggrandizement. He protested against the extra income paid to IIM professors for official work such as conducting admission interviews. He made several RTI queries to obtain the pay details of top IIM officials.

IIM Bangalore issued a censure order to him, directing him to retract his e-mails sent to students. Malghan retracted his statement under protest. His fellow faculty members objected to his activities, saying it would hamper campus placement at management institutes.

== See also ==
- Indian Institute of Management Bangalore
- Hindustan Unilever
