= Bed Head =

Brand of haircare products

Bed Head by TIGI
- Product type: Haircare, Nail products
- Current owner: Evermark
- Country: United States
- Introduced: 2003; 23 years ago
- Markets: United States
- Previous owners: Unilever (2003–2023)
- Website: www.bedhead.com

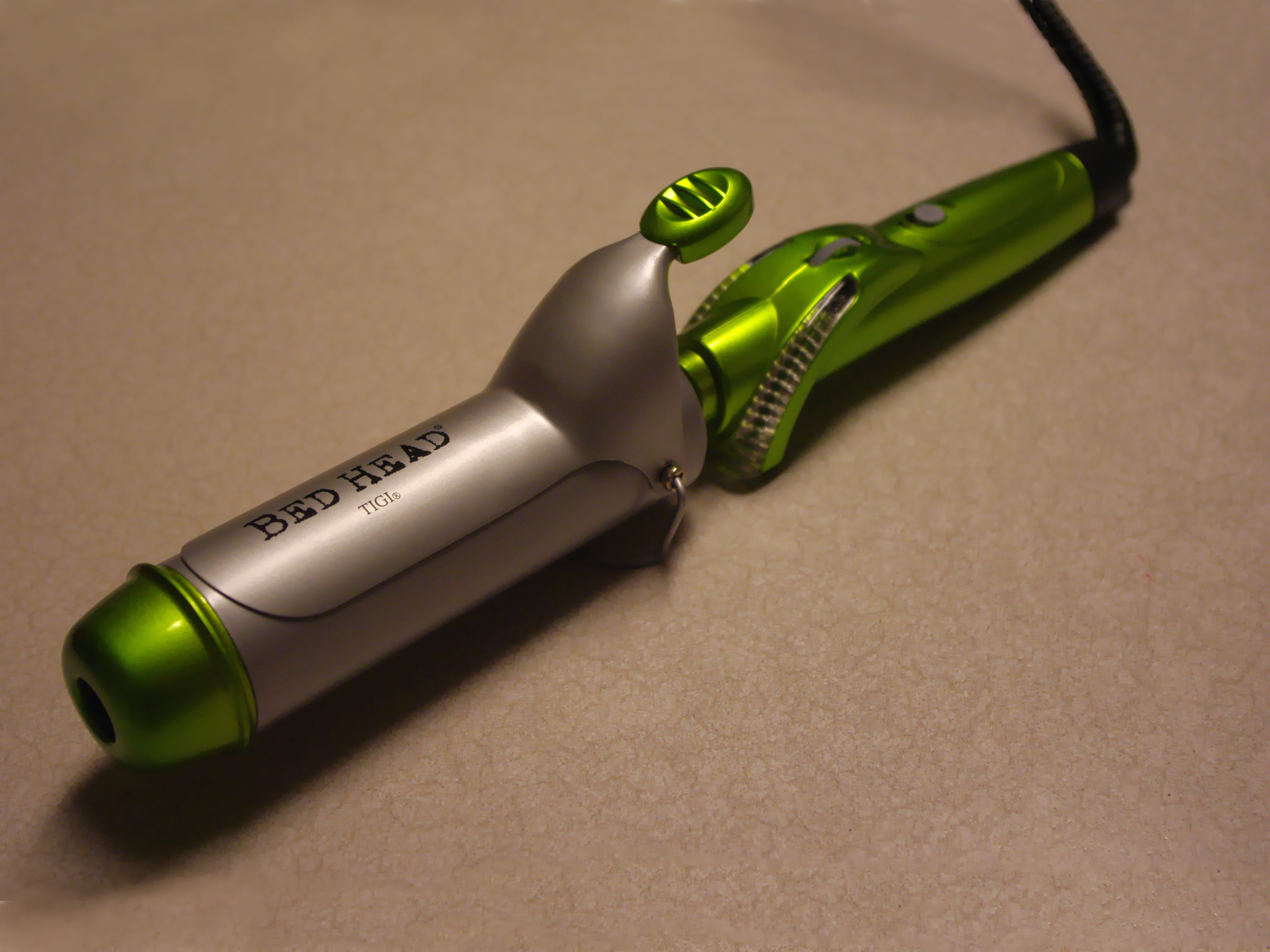
A 1 3/4" Bed Head curling iron.

Bed Head is a line of haircare and nail products created by Toni & Guy and distributed by Evermark under the TIGI brand, who have been producing the line since its inception. Other products produced under the Bed Head name have been distributed by the Helen of Troy company since May 2007.

The cosmetics line was first produced in 2003. In 2009, Unilever acquired TIGI, including the Bed Head brand. In 2021, TIGI was one of the brands spun-off by Unilever into the standalone company Elida Beauty.

== Advertising ==
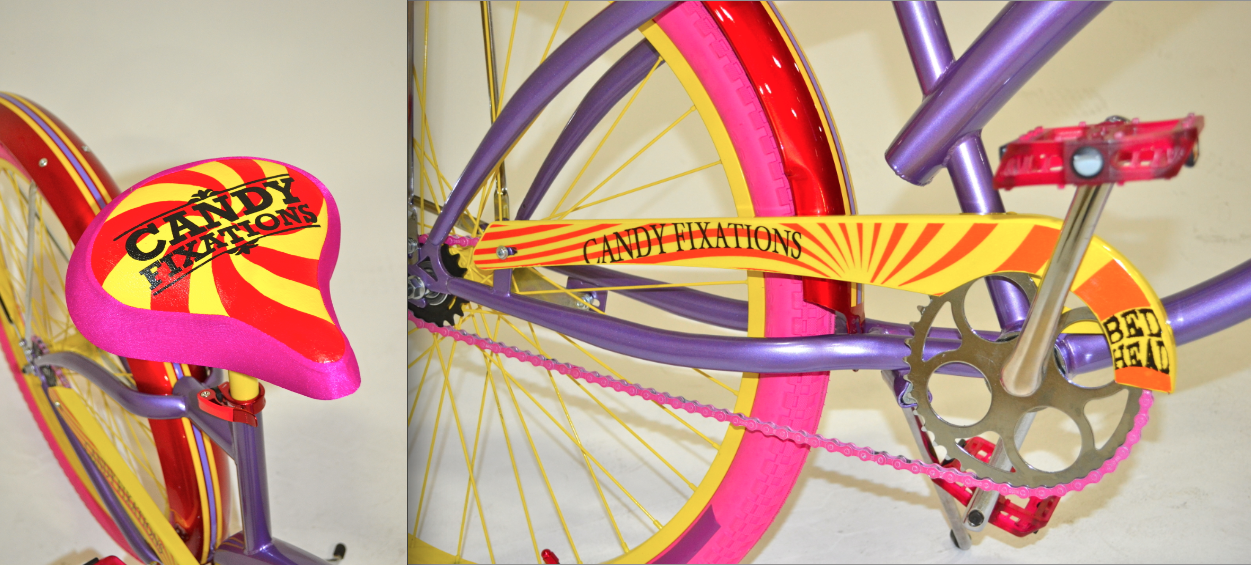
Villy Custom Fashion Bicycles for TIGI hair products, Candy Fixation

In July 2007, the product line was chosen to be used by the Dallas Cowboy Cheerleaders. Before starring in the American TV show Passions, actor Adrian Bellani was a spokesperson and model for the products.

Starting in 2011, Bed Head partnered up with Villy Custom to build custom luxury fashion bikes for their brand.

== Counterfeits ==
In March 2003, the producers of the products and Health Canada issued a notice about counterfeit products being sold in Canada. The recalled products said to contain Enterobacter gergoviae or Burkholderia cepacia, which may cause infections if applied to the eyes. This case, along with others, was one motivation to toughen the intellectual property laws in Canada at the time.
