= Surf Excel =

Washing powder brand by Unilever

- Product type: Laundry detergent
- Current owner: Unilever
- Produced by: Hindustan Unilever; Unilever Sri Lanka; Unilever Pakistan
- Introduced: 1996; 30 years ago
- Related brands: OMO, Breeze, Skip
- Markets: South Asia except Nepal

Surf Excel is a washing powder brand that is currently as the counterpart brand of OMO detergent in the India, Pakistan, Bangladesh and Sri Lanka markets.
