= Arce Dairy =

Philippine dairy company

Arce Foods Corporation
- Industry: Food
- Founded: 1995; 31 years ago
- Founder: Mauro Arce
- Headquarters: Quezon City, Philippines
- Area served: Philippines, Hong Kong, Middle East
- Products: Carabao milk-based ice cream
- Owners: Arce family
- Website: arcedairy.com

Arce Foods Corporation (Note: Stylized as ArceFoods and ArceDairy), also known as Arce Dairy Ice Cream, is a Philippine dairy company which manufactures and sells carabao milk-based ice cream.

== History ==
=== Origin and Selecta ice cream ===
The history of Arce Dairy Ice Cream dates back to 1935 when couple Ramon and Carmen Arce established their first dairy plant in 1935 in Novaliches (in current Quezon City) which was then still a rural area. Ramon was a stenographer for President Manuel L. Quezon and often brought carabao milk to his American friends, and Carmen made the milk into ice cream. Due to popular demand, prior to the World War II, an ice cream making machine was bought from the Americans. The machine was used to develop the family's first ice cream recipe.

The ice cream was later on sold under the Selecta as part of the couple's restaurant business.

The second dairy plant was established in 1952 in Balintawak. The formula of the carabao's milk ice cream which would be later be associated with the contemporary Arce Dairy brand was guided by the palate of Mauro Arce, the youngest son of Ramon and Carmen Arce. In January 1990, the RFM Corporation acquired Selecta from the Arces. However the Arces retained the original plant and the corporation which owned Selecta.

RFM shifted the base of Selecta ice cream products from carabao's milk to cow's milk.

=== ArceDairy ice cream ===
After the non-compete clause of the sale expired, Mauro ARce revived the family ice cream business under the Arce Foods Corporation in 1995.

By 2019, business has been managed by members of the third to fourth generation of the Arce family.

== Products ==
Arce Dairy became known for selling ice cream produced from carabao's milk rather than cow's milk. In 2019, Arce Dairy has more than 40 flavors with vanilla, mantecado and avocado being the primary flavors. Its ice cream cone line is called "Drummies".

As of 2019, supermarkets are reportedly the biggest customers of Arce Dairy. The company also sells to hotels, schools and cafés in the Philippines. It also export products to Hong Kong, Japan, Qatar and the United Arab Emirates, Qatar as of the same period.
