= Unilever Sri Lanka =

Regional subsidiary of British multinational company

- Industry: Consumer goods
- Predecessor: Lever Brother Ceylon Limited (1938–1991); Unilever Ceylon (1991–1996)
- Founded: 1938; 88 years ago
- Headquarters: Colombo, Sri Lanka
- Area served: Worldwide
- Key people: Carl Cruz (Chairman)
- Products: Skin care; personal care; cleaning agents; drinks; food; toothpaste; baby food; pet food; chewing gum; pharmaceutical and consumer health care; pregnancy test
- Brands: Lipton Ceylon; Lux; Surf Excel; Sunsilk; Marmite; Knorr; Lipton Ice Tea; Bru coffee; Clear; Dove; Lifebuoy; Signal; Close-Up; Fair & Lovely; Comfort; Sunlight; Domestos; Astra margarine; Rin
- Number of employees: 1,900 (2020)
- Parent: Unilever
- Subsidiaries: Brooke Bond Ceylon (Pvt) Limited; Ceytea (Pvt) Limited; Lever Brothers (Exports and Marketing) (Pvt) Limited; Maddema Trading Company (Pvt) Limited; Unilever Sri Lanka Limited; Unilever Lipton Ceylon Limited
- Website: unilever.com.lk

Unilever Sri Lanka is a Sri Lankan consumer goods company located in Colombo. It is wholly owned by Unilever, a British multinational consumer goods company. Its products include food, beauty products, personal care, pharmaceuticals, and baby products. Unilever Sri Lanka was established in 1938 as Lever Brother Ceylon Limited. In 1972, it was renamed Unilever Sri Lanka. The company has been ranked as Most Valuable and Strongest Brand and Most Respected Entity. The company has over two dozen brands that are market leaders in Sri Lanka since the 1940s. Unilever operates from a factory complex in an industrial zone of Horana since 2012. About 96% of the company's products are manufactured locally, and more than twenty of its brands are exported outside Sri Lanka.

== Awards ==
Unilever Sri Lanka's largest factory facility, in Horana, is ISO 9001-certified. It manufactures up to 200 products, covering fourteen brands. In 2015, the company won the SLIM Brand Excellence award. Unilever Sri Lanka has developed a plastic-free, environmentally friendly packaging system. It was awarded the first eco-friendly baby product SLS certification in 2020.

== Unilever Sri Lanka brands ==
Unilever Sri Lanka-manufactured brands
Brand name	Product type	Sales (US$)
Signal	Oral hygiene	
Dove	Skin care, hair care	
Lux	Women's soap, shower gel	
Pond's	Beauty products	
Rexona	Antiperspirant deodorant	
Axe	Deodorant, shower gel, body spray	
Lifebuoy	Soap	
Clear	Anti-dandruff shampoo	
Fair& Lovely	Skin-lightening cosmetic	
Pears	Baby soap, face wash	
Sunsilk	Hair care	
Sunlight	Dishwashing detergent	
Lipton	Tea, iced tea	320,000,000 (2012)
Knorr	Food	
Close-Up	Toothpaste	
Astra	Margarine	
Rin	Laundry detergent	

== See also ==
- List of food companies
- List of largest companies in Sri Lanka
