= Cosmos Bottling Corporation =

Defunct Philippine soft drink manufacturer

- Formerly: Philippines; Manila Aerated Water Factory (1918–1941); Manila-Cosmos Aerated Water Factory (1945–1968); Cosmos Bottling Company (1968–1978); Hong Kong; Cosmos Aerated Water Co. Ltd. (1947–1966)
- Company type: Subsidiary
- Founded: 1918; 108 years ago
- Founder: Wong Ning
- Defunct: 2007; 19 years ago
- Fate: Acquired by San Miguel Corporation and The Coca-Cola Company under Coca-Cola Bottlers Philippines Inc.
- Area served: Philippines; Hong Kong
- Products: Soft drink
- Parent: Independent (1918–1989); RFM Corporation (1989–2001); Coca-Cola Botttlers Philippines Inc./San Miguel Brewery (2001–2007)

Cosmos Bottling Corporation (CBC) was a soft drink manufacturer in the Philippines. Cosmos was founded in 1918 by Wong Ning and is the manufacturer and distributor of Pop Cola, Sarsi, and Cheers.

== History ==
Cosmos Bottling Corporation was founded as the Manila Aerated Water Factory at 735 Misericordia St., Sta. Cruz, Manila (now 735 Tomas Mapua St.) in 1918 by Wong Ning, a Guangdong native who migrated to the Philippines. He was later arrested and killed by the Japanese during World War II. Post-war 1945, Wong Ning's eldest son, Dr. Henry Gao-Hong Wong, revived Manila Aerated Water Factory as Manila-Cosmos Aerated Water Factory. They later expanded their operations in Hong Kong in 1947 as the Cosmos Aerated Water Co. Ltd., where they also became popular in Hong Kong. In 1970, Henry Wong suffered a stroke due to a brain tumor and died at the age of 53; his successor is an outsider of the family, William Ma Padua. A decade later, William suffered a mild heart attack in one of his visits to the United States, marking his resignation from his position, and Hubert Wong, the late predecessor's brother, took over the position.

Their first products were Macos Softdrinks which offer Orange, Root Beer, Sarsaparilla, and Lemonada variants while in Hong Kong, offers Cream Soda, Mulberry, Grape and Pineapple. Macos was rebranded as Cosmos in the later years which rose their popularity with one of their flagship product, Cosmos Sarsaparilla. Cosmos Sarsaparilla was again rebranded as Sarsi in 1966. The latter also applies to Cosmos Orange when it was rebranded as Sunta in 1972. Pop Cola was later introduced in 1975, and Cheers in the 1980s, which later became the indirect successor of Sunta.

In 1989, the Wong Family sold their beverage business to RFM Corporation. After the acquisition, the then-newly acquired Cosmos released a series of television advertisements under the "Bagong Tunog" campaign, and for its brands, Pop Cola's "Bilib sila sa Pinoy", Cheers' "Buhay Bulilit", and the most iconic Sarsi "Angat sa Iba" campaign, which earned the title of 1989 Creative Guild TV Ad of the year.

In the following years, Cosmos' sales rapidly grew and competed against major soda manufacturers. In 1995, Cosmos signed a licensing agreement with American soft drink maker, Jolt Cola to manufacture and distribute the brand in the Philippines. In 1996, Cosmos acquired the local franchise of RC Cola from Union Ajinomoto Inc. of the late Leonardo Ty. They also signed a licensing agreement with Sunkist Growers Inc. to produce Sunkist in the Philippines. Jaz Cola was acquired by Cosmos from the late Augusto "Boboy" Syjuco Jr. a few months later in the same year. Cosmos had a joint venture with P.T. Tirta Investama for the manufacture and export of Aqua in the Philippines.

San Miguel Corporation and Coca-Cola Bottlers Philippines Inc. acquired Cosmos Bottling Corporation and its brands from RFM Corporation in 2001. Following by the acquisition, all the licenses to produce and distribute Jolt Cola, RC Cola, and Sunkist were terminated.

== Brands ==
- Aqua
- Cheers Cherry
- Cheers Crista
- Cheers Golden Apple
- Cheers Lemon
- Cheers Orange
- Cosmos Sarsaparilla
- Jaz Cola (regional brand, specifically for the Visayas and Mindanao market)
- Jolt Cola
- Pop Cola
- RC Cola
- Sarsi
- Diet Pop Cola
- Diet Sarsi
- Sparkle
- Sunkist
- Sunta

== See also ==
- Pop Cola Panthers
