= Hindustan Unilever =

Indian consumer goods company pvt ltd

Hindustan Unilever Limited
- Type: Public company
- Traded as: BSE: 500696; NSE: HINDUNILVR; BSE SENSEX constituent; NSE NIFTY 50 constituent
- ISIN: INE030A01027
- Industry: Fast-moving consumer goods
- Predecessor: Indian Vanaspati Manufacturing Company (1931–1956); Lever Brothers India Limited (1933–1956); United Traders Limited (1935–1956); Hindustan Lever Limited (1956–2007)
- Founded: 1933; 93 years ago
- Headquarters: Mumbai, Maharashtra, India
- Key people: Priya Nair (CEO and MD)
- Products: Foods; cleaning agents; personal care; skin care; dietary supplements; protein supplements
- Revenue: ▲₹694 billion (US$7.2 billion) (2026)
- Operating income: ▲₹150 billion (US$1.6 billion) (2026)
- Net income: ▲₹151 billion (US$1.6 billion) (2026)
- Total assets: ▼₹798 billion (US$8.3 billion) (2026)
- Total equity: ▼₹487 billion (US$5.1 billion) (2026)
- Number of employees: 26,667 (2025) (including 18,465 workers)
- Parent: Unilever (61.90%)
- Website: www.hul.co.in

Hindustan Unilever Limited (HUL) is an Indian fast-moving consumer goods company, headquartered in Mumbai. It is a subsidiary of the Anglo-Dutch company Unilever. Its products include foods, beverages, cleaning agents, personal care products and other consumer staples.

The company was established in India in 1931 as Hindustan Vanaspati Manufacturing Co. Following a merger of constituent groups in 1956, it was renamed Hindustan Lever Limited. The company was renamed again in June 2007 as Hindustan Unilever Limited.

Hindustan Unilever has been at the helm of a lot of controversies, such as dumping highly toxic mercury-contaminated waste in regular dumps, contaminating the land and water of Kodaikanal. (See: Kodaikanal mercury poisoning). The British-Dutch company also faced major flak for an advertising campaign covering the Hindu pilgrimage site at Kumbh Mela in a negative light, calling it a "place where old people get abandoned," a move that was termed racist and insensitive.

In December 2018 HUL announced its acquisition of GlaxoSmithKline India's consumer business for US$3.8 billion in an all-equity merger deal with a 1:4.39 ratio. However, the integration of GSK's 3,800 employees remained uncertain as HUL stated there was no clause for retention of employees in the deal. In April 2020, HUL completed its merger with GlaxoSmithKline Consumer Healthcare (GSKCH India) after completing all legal procedures.

== Presence ==
Hindustan Unilever's corporate headquarters are located in Andheri, Mumbai. The campus is spread over 12.5 acres of land and houses over 1,600 employees. The Campus is designed by Mumbai-based architecture firm Kapadia Associates.

The company's previous headquarters were located in Backbay Reclamation, Mumbai at the Lever House, where it was housed for more than 46 years.

The Hindustan Unilever Research Centre (HURC) was set up in 1966 in Mumbai, and Unilever Research India in Bangalore in 1997. In 2006, the company's research facilities were brought together at a single site in Bangalore.

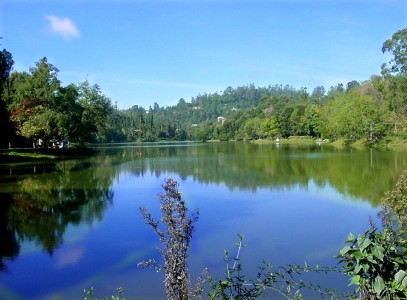
Kodaikanal Lake, one of the most popular tourist attractions in South India, was contaminated following Unilever's illegal dumping of mercury.

== Controversies ==
=== Mercury pollution ===
In 2001 a thermometer factory in Kodaikanal run by Hindustan Unilever dumped glass contaminated with mercury and selling it to scrap merchants. Protests by local NGOs and Greenpeace lead to the shutting of the factory in March 2001. The issue has since snowballed into a controversy impacting the reputation of the company and led to a series of regulatory and legal confrontations. The issue was eventually resolved in 2016 through an out of court settlement between the company and the affected ex-workers.

== Awards ==
In 2014, Hindustan Unilever Limited received Porter Prize for Creating Shared Value, awarded by the Institute for Competitiveness, India. It ranked number one on the Forbes list of ‘Most Innovative Companies’ globally for 2014. It also received an award as a 'Conscious Capitalist of the Year' at the 2013 Forbes India Leadership Awards. Unilever was named the fourth most respected company in India in a survey conducted by Business World in 2013.

In a 2015 Nielsen campus track-business school survey, Hindustan Unilever was among the top employers of choice for B-school students graduating that year. It has often been called a 'Dream Employer' for application by B-School students in India. In 2012, it was recognised as one of the world's most innovative companies by Forbes. With a ranking of number 6, it was the highest ranked FMCG company.

HUL is one of the country's largest exporters; it has been recognised as a Golden Super Star Trading House by the Government of India.

== Brands and products ==
HUL is the market leader in Indian consumer products with presence in over 20 consumer categories such as soaps, tea, detergents and shampoos among others with over 700 million Indian consumers using its products. Sixteen of HUL's brands featured in the Nielsen Corporation Brand Equity list of 100 Most Trusted Brands Annual Survey (2014), carried out by Brand Equity, a supplement of The Economic Times.

=== Food ===
- Annapurna salt and Atta (formerly known as Kissan Annapurna)
- Boost chocolate Drink mix
- Bru and Sunrise coffee powder
- Brooke Bond (3 Roses, Taj Mahal, Taaza, Red Label) tea
- Kissan squashes, ketchups, juices and jams
- Lipton leaf tea, ice tea
- Knorr soups & meal makers, Ketchups, Readymade Sauces and soupy noodles
- Kwality Wall's frozen desserts (sold in 2025)
- Hellmann's mayonnaise
- Magnum (ice cream)
- Cornetto Ice cream cones
- Horlicks (Health Drink supplements)

=== Homecare ===
- Active wheel detergent
- Cif cream cleaner
- Comfort fabric softeners
- Domex disinfectant/toilet cleaner
- Love & Care wash care
- Nature Protect disinfectant surface cleaner
- Rin detergents and bleach
- Sunlight detergent and colour care
- Surf Excel detergent and gentle wash
- Vim dishwash
- Magic – Water Saver

=== Personal care ===
- Aviance Beauty Solutions
- Axe deodorant, aftershave lotion and soap
- Lever Ayush Therapy ayurvedic health care and personal care products
- International Breeze
- Brylcreem hair cream and hair gel
- Clear anti-dandruff hair products
- Clinic Plus shampoos and oils
- Close-Up toothpastes
- Dove skin & hair care range: bar, lotions, creams and anti-perspirant deodorants
- Denim shaving products
- Dermalogica
- Elle 18
- Find Your Happy Place
- Glow and Lovely, skin lightening cream
- Hamam soaps
- Indulekha Ayurvedic soaps, shampoos, hair oils
- Lakmé beauty products and salons
- Lifebuoy soaps, Hand Sanitizers and handwashes
- Liril 2000 soap
- Lux soap, body wash and deodorant
- Nature Protect
- Pears soap, body wash
- Pepsodent toothpastes
- Pond's talcs and Cosmetics
- Rexona Deodarants
- Sunsilk shampoo
- Sure anti-perspirant
- V Wash feminine wash
- Vaseline petroleum jelly, skincare lotions
- TRESemmé
- TIGI

== See also ==
- Brooke Bond Taj Mahal Tea House, Hindustan Unilever's first tea house restaurant
- Dalda, vegetable cooking oil brand started by HUL
- Kodaikanal mercury poisoning
