= Jane Wurwand =

Scottish businesswoman

- Born: Edinburgh, Scotland
- Occupations: Founder, Dermalogica Co-Chair, Wurwand Foundation and FOUND/LA
- Spouse: Raymond Wurwand

Jane Wurwand is the founder of Dermalogica, an American personal care company.

== Early life ==
Born and raised in the United Kingdom, Wurwand’s first job was as a “Saturday Girl” sweeping hair cuttings off the floor at a local salon in the neighborhood where she grew up. After working up to a “shampoo girl” and continuing her career in skin therapy and cosmetics, Wurwand became a licensed instructor. Her next role was for US firm Redken, launching its skincare brand in South Africa – a job that involved travel to the United States. By then, Wurwand was dating her now-husband, Raymond Wurwand, a South African business school graduate who sold equipment to the skin care industry. The two moved to Marina Del Rey in Los Angeles in 1983.

== Career ==
=== International Dermal Institute (IDI) ===
After arriving in Los Angeles, Wurwand founded the International Dermal Institute, where she began offering $10 skin care classes to fellow cosmetologists. During this time, Wurwand set out to develop products free of common skin irritants, including lanolin, SD alcohol, mineral oil, artificial colors and fragrances. This was inspired by student requests as well as a lack of existing products that Jane Wurwand could use on her skin, which experienced dermatitis and chronic eczema.

=== Dermalogica ===
On the heels of IDI, Wurwand founded Dermalogica in 1986. The company was acquired by Unilever in 2015 As of 2013, Dermalogica has trained more than 100,000 skin therapists around the globe. With a global distribution to over 100 countries and 35 concept spaces, Dermalogica can be found in locations that span North America, Europe, Asia, Australia, Africa, and the Middle East; the concept spaces and/or hybrid learning centers worldwide are dedicated to bringing consumer and professional education, professional treatments and retail sales together under one roof.

=== Dermalogica Foundation and FITE ===
In 2011, Wurwand launched Financial Independence Through Entrepreneurship (FITE), which works with Kiva to provide small loans to women entrepreneurs in more than 68 countries. Through its global FITE initiative, Dermalogica has created vocational training programs and more than 75,000 loans for women to start or grow a business. FITE also sponsors the UN Foundation’s work on innovation and entrepreneurship.

=== Skin In The Game ===
In 2021, Jane published her first book, Skin in the Game, with Harper Collins.

== Philanthropy ==
In November 2018, Wurwand her husband Raymond started Wurwand Foundation, a private family foundation in Los Angeles. Their signature initiative, FOUND/LA, supports local entrepreneurs, offering funding, mentorship, unique incubator programs and educational resources to those business owners who have been underserved or overlooked by traditional systems.

Since 2010, Wurwand has been a member of the Clinton Global Initiative, and is part of their Women and Girls Action Committee. In 2011, Wurwand spoke before the United Nations (UN) as the keynote speaker regarding the FITE mission to fund 25,000 women-owned small businesses worldwide, championed by Ban Ki-Moon, Secretary-General for the UN, and returned to the UN in 2012 to addresses the role of business in empowering women. Wurwand serves as a special advisor to the UN Foundation’s Global Entrepreneurs Council, supporting their work with the UN to advance women and girls. Wurwand also works with the Network for Teaching Entrepreneurship and the National Association of Women’s Business Owners, which named Wurwand “Business Woman of the Year” in Los Angeles in 2009. Wurwand also mentors graduate students and serves on the Board for the Price Center for Entrepreneurial Studies at The Anderson School of Business Management UCLA. Wurwand was appoint by President Obama as a Founding Member of The Presidential Ambassadors for Global Entrepreneurship (PAGE), a collaboration between American entrepreneurs, the White House, the Department of Commerce, and interagency partners.

== Awards ==
In May 2012, Wurwand was named CEO/Business Owner of the Year by the Los Angeles Business Journal, as part of the publication’s annual recognition program, Women Who Make a Difference. In addition to receiving a CEW Achiever Award in 2014, Wurwand was awarded the 2016 Legend of Beauty Award by Beauty Industry West. Wurwand is also a 2016 Presidential Ambassador for Global Entrepreneurship. In 2018 she was honored with the Lifetime Achiever Award by CEW. Wurwand has been named one of the “30 World Changing Women” by Conscious Media Company. Wurwand was made a Fellow of the City and Guilds of London Institute, one of only 500 in the Master Guilds 1,000 year history. In 2023, Jane Wurwand was named one of Forbes "50 over 50" influential business, lifestyle, and entrepreneur leaders on their US list.
