= Zendium =

Brand of toothpaste marketed by Unilever

Zendium is a brand of toothpaste marketed by Unilever in Austria, Belgium, Croatia, Czech Republic, Denmark, France, Germany, Hungary, Italy, the Middle East, the Netherlands, Norway, Sweden, Slovakia and Switzerland.

== History ==
Zendium was introduced in the Netherlands in 1976, its formula being based on the enzyme research of Henk Hoogendoorn.

As of 2007, zendium's market share in Denmark was about 37%.

== Ingredients ==
The active ingredients in Zendium are:

- Enzymes: amyloglucosidase, glucosidase, lactoperoxidase, glucose oxidase and lysozyme.
- Sodium fluoride
- Colostrum
- Lactoferrin
- Potassium thiocyanate
- Sodium fluoride
- Zinc gluconate
- Abrasive: Hydrated silica
- Surfactant: Steareth-30

The supporting ingredients in Zendium are:

- Carrageenan
- Citric acid
- Disodium phosphate
- Glyceril
- Hydrated silica
- Sodium benzoate
- Sorbitol
- Steareth-30
- Water
- Xanthan gum

The flavours and colours in Zendium are:

- Aroma
- Sodium Saccharin
- CI 77891

Unlike many types of toothpaste, Zendium products do not contain the foaming agent sodium lauryl sulfate (SDS or NaDS, where D means dodecyl). The lack of SLS protects the mucous membranes and is believed to reduce the risk of aphthous ulcers. In addition, since Zendium does not contain SLS or similar foaming agents, it can be used together with chlorhexidine.
