= Theron T. Pond =

American pharmacist

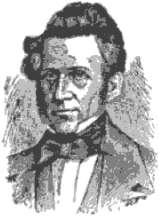
- Born: Theron Tilden Pond; August 20, 1800; Augusta, New York
- Died: February 22, 1852 (aged 51); Utica, New York
- Occupation: Businessman
- Spouse: Sarah Mary Van Ranst (m. 1831)
- Children: 4

Theron Tilden Pond (August 20, 1800 – February 22, 1852) was an American pharmacist and businessman, credited as the founder of the T. T. Pond company, which he co-founded along with several associates in 1849.

== Biography ==
Theron T. Pond was born in Augusta, New York on August 20, 1800.

He married Sarah Mary Van Ranst in 1831, and they had four children.

He developed "Pond's Extract", to be used as a "healing tea", from the bark of witch hazel. This was used as a topical salve for wounds and purported remedy for numerous other ailments. Though he was the founder of the company, he could not hold on to it for long and sold it soon. The company he founded was incorporated with the name Pond's Extract Company in 1914. Pond's Cream is currently produced by Unilever.

Pond died in Utica, New York on February 22, 1852.
