= Kodaikanal mercury poisoning =

Environmental contamination incident in India

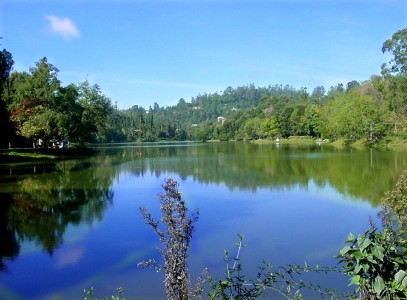
Kodaikanal Lake, the most popular tourist attraction in South India, is also contaminated

Kodaikanal mercury poisoning is a proven case of mercury contamination at the hill station of Kodaikanal, Tamil Nadu, India by Hindustan Unilever in the process of making mercury thermometers for export around the world. The exposé of the environmental abuse led to the closure of the factory in 2001 and opened up a series of issues in India such as corporate liability, corporate accountability and corporate negligence.

== Mercury pollution in Kodaikanal ==
The mercury contamination in Kodaikanal originated at a thermometer factory owned by Hindustan Unilever. Unilever acquired the thermometer factory from cosmetics maker Pond's India Ltd. Pond's moved the factory from the United States to India in 1982 after the plant owned there by its parent, Chesebrough-Pond's, had to be dismantled following increased awareness in developed countries of polluting industries. In 1987, Pond's India and the thermometer factory went to Hindustan Unilever when it acquired Cheseborough-Pond's globally.

The factory imported mercury from the United States, and exported finished thermometers to markets in the United States and Europe. Around 2001, a number of workers at the factory began complaining of kidney and related ailments. Public interest groups such as Tamil Nadu Alliance Against Mercury (TNAAC) alleged that the Company had been disposing mercury waste without following proper protocols. In early 2001, public interest groups unearthed a pile of broken glass thermometers with remains of Mercury from an interior of part of the shola forest, which they suspected could have come from the company. In March, a public protest led by local workers' union and international environmental organisation Greenpeace forced the company to shut down the factory. Soon the company admitted that it did dispose of mercury contaminated waste. The company said in its 2002 annual report and its latest Sustainability Report that it did not dump glass waste contaminated with mercury on the land behind its factory, but only a quantity of 5.3 metric tonnes of glass containing 0.15% residual mercury had been sold to a scrap recycler located about three kilometers from the factory, in breach of the company procedures. Quoting a report prepared by an international environmental consultant, Unilever said there was no health effect on the workers of the factory or any impact on the environment. This is hotly contested by a book published by Pan MacMillan in 2023, Heavy Metal: How a Global Corporation Poisoned Kodaikanal, authored by veteran journalist-tuned-public policy leader Ameer Shahul.

== Reverse dumping ==
Once the factory was shut down, public interest groups demanded the return of the remaining mercury waste to the United States for recycling, remediation of the factory site, and address of the health complaints of the workers. Local groups and workers' union under the leadership of Greenpeace, represented to the company, regulatory bodies, and the government, besides initiating legal action against the company.

Greenpeace campaigner Ameer Shahul led the public affairs groups and workers collaboration in forcing the Company to collect 290 tonnes of dumped mercury waste from the shola forest and send back to the United States for recycling in 2003. This was widely hailed by the media as 'reverse dumping'. Later Greenpeace campaigners Ameer Shahul and Navroz Mody led the groups in lobbying for remediation of the site and initiated an investigation by the Department of Atomic Energy of Government of India, which found that the free mercury level in the atmosphere of Kodaikanal was 1000 times more than what is found in normal conditions. Analysis of water, sediment and fish samples collected from Kodaikanal Lake by a team of scientists of the Department of Atomic Energy showed elevated levels of mercury four years after the stoppage of mercury emissions. A series of scientific studies have also been carried out by Governmental and non-governmental organisations to determine the extent of damage caused to the environment and to the people who were exposed to mercury in the factory.

== Remediation of the site ==
Greenpeace and workers' unions continued to mount pressure on the company to take responsibility for the dumping crimes it had committed and for meddling with a pristine environment. They asked the regulatory bodies to prosecute the company. With these demands, public interest groups led by Greenpeace campaign head Shahul spooked the annual general body meeting of Hindustan Unilever in 2004. Consequently, the company began working with the regulatory body Tamil Nadu Pollution Control Board (TNPCB) to remediate the soil, de-contaminate and scrap the thermometer-making equipment at the Kodaikanal site. The company appointed National Environmental Engineering Research Institute (NEERI) to finalise the scope for remediation, which was vehemently opposed by environmentalists. In 2006, the plant, machinery and materials used in thermometer manufacturing at the site were decontaminated and disposed of as scrap to industrial recyclers. In the following year, NEERI conducted trials at the factory for remediation of the contaminated soil on site, and recommended a remediation protocol of soil washing and thermal retorting. These were hotly contested by environmental groups under the leadership of Nityanand Jayaraman. Ultimately, the Tamil Nadu Pollution Control Board (TNPCB) recommended a remediation standard of up to 20 mg/kg of mercury concentration in soil, which means 95% of the samples analysed after the remediation process should be of less than 20 mg/kg. Consequently, pre-remediation work started in May 2009.

Public interest groups contested the soil clean-up criteria and alleged that TNPCB is helping Unilever clean up to lower standards to cut costs. The acceptable mercury level being suggested by TNPCB is at least 20 times higher than what Unilever would have been required to do if they had caused the same contamination in the United Kingdom, where they are based. They also called for transparency and public participation in the process of deciding the levels of clean-up and in the process of clean-up.

== Workers' health problems ==
After the shut down of the factory, the health specialists from Bangalore-based Community Health Centre conducted a survey among the former workers of the factory. It found that former workers of the factory had visible signs of mercury poisoning such as gum and skin allergy and related problems, 'which appeared to be due to exposure to mercury'.

The company claims that comprehensive occupational safety and health systems existed at the Kodaikanal factory prior to its closure in 2001. Internal monitoring within the factory and external audits carried out by statutory authorities during the operations of the factory showed that there were no adverse health effects to the workers on account of their employment at the factory. It says there had been a comprehensive medical examination conducted by a panel of doctors using a questionnaire developed by Mine Safety and Health Administration (MSHA) of the United States Department of Labor; a study by the Certifying Surgeon from the Inspectorate of Factories; an assessment by P N Viswanathan of Indian Institute of Toxicology Research (IITR); a study by Tom van Teuenbroek of TNO; and a study by IITR, formerly known as Industrial Toxicology Research Centre(ITRC) as directed by a Monitoring Committee set up by the Supreme Court of India.

The company says its conclusions of its occupational health surveillance were also endorsed by the All India Institute of Medical Sciences (AIIMS) and the National Institute of Occupational Health (NIOH).

In February 2006, a group of ex-employees of the factory approached the Madras High Court seeking directions for conducting a fresh health survey and providing economic rehabilitation. A year later, the Madras High Court constituted a five-member expert committee, with representatives from ITRC, AIIMS and NIOH to decide whether the alleged health conditions of the workers and their families were related to mercury exposure, and recommend whether there was need for a new health study. The Committee after examining the ex-workers, questioning the Hindustan Unilever Limited (HUL) officials and after a visit to the factory in October 2007 submitted its report suggesting that there is "no sufficient evidence to link the current clinical condition of the factory workers to the mercury exposure in the factory in the past". Accepting the report, the Madras High Court ruled out the need for any fresh health study. In the meantime, the Ministry of Labour and Employment, which is also a respondent in the case before the Madras High Court conducted a detailed study by a team comprising experts from various fields found that there is prima facie evidence to suggest that not only the workers of the factory, but even the children of the workers, have suffered because of exposure to mercury. The Ministry submitted its report to the Madras High Court in 2011. It also recommended setting up a Board to examine the extent of damage or disability suffered by workers and their children because of exposure to mercury, and based on the assessment of the Board workers can approach the Employment Compensation Commissioner to seek compensation.

Following the release of Sofia Ashraf's 'Kodikanal Won't', a protest against corporate pollution, the song racked up significant attention, prompting a personal response from the CEO of Unilever in 2015. The video was followed by an aggressive social media campaign, calling for a boycott of the company's products. Ashraf's song brought attention to the demands of swift mercury clean-up and compensation to the 1,045 workers affected by the poisoning. The song was popularly deamed as underscoring the power of social media and mainstream traction to hold corporations accountable, demanding justice to the affected groups and communities.

In March 2016, Hindustan Unilever entered into an out of court settlement with its ex-employees to provide "undisclosed" ex-gratia payment, in addition to long-term health and well-being benefits, to 511 of its former workers of the thermometer factory who were exposed to toxic mercury vapour. Accordingly, the ex-employees withdrew the 'class action litigation' before the Madras High Court and the High Court of Justice, London.

=== Toxic Racism ===
The long-term effects of the mercury poisoning created greater conversations on global toxic racism within the country. In Mukul Kumar's, "Environmental Racism and the Global Political Ecology of Industrial Disasters", the author exemplifies toxic racism within the broader framework of global environmental inequality using the Kodikanal mercury poisoning case. The relocation of mercury thermometer production from New York to India in the 1980s reflects a trend of transferring hazardous industries to the Global South as the Global North tighten their environmental standards. A detailed report by the Ministry Ministry of Labour and Employment, found that racial and ethnic minorities in Kodikanal, including Adivasi and Dalit communities, were disporoportionately exposed to illness, disability and death. Furthermore, an imbalance between genders is highlighted by Shweta Narayan, in which the responsibility of a child born with a disability, due to the mercury poisoning, was borne primarily by the woman or both were turned away from the husband's family.
