= Selecta (dairy products) =

Filipino dairy products brand

- Logos of Selecta ice cream (left) and Selecta milk (right)
- Product type: Ice cream, UHT milk, margarine
- Current owner: RFM Corporation
- Produced by: RFM Corporation (milk products); Magnum RFM Ice Cream, Inc. (ice cream products)
- Country: Philippines
- Introduced: 1933; 93 years ago
- Previous owners: Arcecon Dairy, Inc. (1933–1990)
- Tagline: Sarap ng Sama-Sama (transl. "It's Delicious Being Together"; ice cream brand only, 2022–present)
- Website: https://www.selectaphilippines.com/ (ice cream brand and products)

Selecta is a Filipino dairy products brand owned by RFM Corporation (PSE: RFM). Its milk business is operated by RFM Corporation, while its ice cream business is operated under a joint-venture with Unilever Philippines, Inc. (known as Magnum RFM Ice Cream, Inc.), and serves as the Philippine branch of Unilever's Heartbrand line of ice cream.

== History ==
The brand's beginnings can be traced back to 1933 when Ramón Arce started pasteurizing carabao milk near his home in Novaliches (then a part of Caloocan), where carabaos were in abundance. Arce would establish his first dairy plant in 1935. Unilever RFM Ice Cream, Inc. would cite the brand's foundation year as 1948. Arce began selling and distributing fresh milk in bottles using the Selecta brand name to residences, restaurants and offices. Soon after, Arce and his wife, Carmen, would come up with their own ice cream recipe made from carabao milk. These products became the foundation of the family's Selecta business, which later included the Selecta restaurants and bakery. The Selecta business was continued by Arce's children after his retirement in 1950. It would establish its Balintawak dairy plant in 1952. By the 1970s, Selecta's carabao milk based ice cream and fresh milk became available in supermarkets. Its milk was packaged in glass bottles while its ice cream was packaged in gold colored tin containers.

In January 1990, RFM Corporation acquired the Selecta trademark from Arcecon Dairy Products, Inc. (successor-in-interest to the Selecta business) and established Selecta Dairy Products, Inc. to take over the production of Selecta ice cream. Under RFM ownership, the recipe of Selecta ice cream was improved and aggressively marketed, posing a serious challenge to then market leader, Magnolia. With its success, its ice cream recipe would eventually shift to cow's milk. Much later, the gold colored tin containers would be changed to gold colored plastic tubs. RFM also introduced its own Selecta milk products which were made from cow's milk.

In January 1995, the family of Mauro Arce, the youngest son of Ramón and Carmen Arce, revived the Arce family's ice cream business under a new name, Arce Dairy. Its ice cream would continue to be made from the former Selecta Balintawak dairy plant using carabao milk and packaged in gold colored tin containers, reminiscent of the original Arce-era Selecta ice cream.

In February 1999, RFM entered into a joint-venture with Unilever Philippines to take over the production and marketing of the Selecta ice cream business. For this purpose, Selecta Walls, Inc. was established. The company would later be renamed to Unilever RFM Ice Cream, Inc. With the establishment of The Magnum Ice Cream Company in 2025, the joint venture was renamed to Magnum RFM Ice Cream, Inc. The Selecta milk business continues to be operated directly by RFM Corporation.
