= Dermalogica =

American company

Dermalogica Inc.
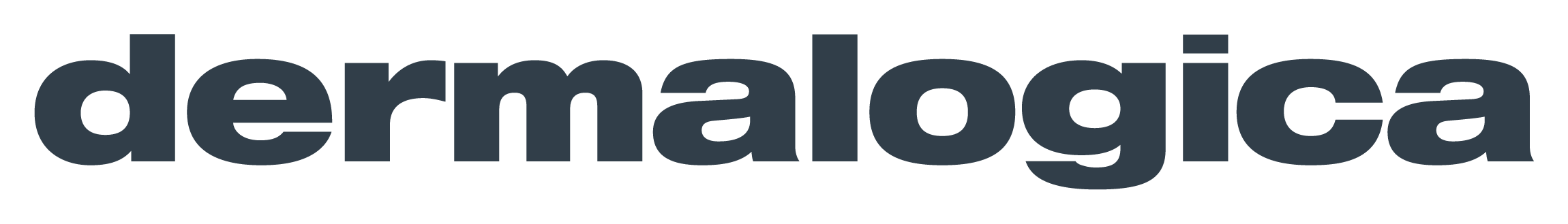
- Type: Subsidiary
- Industry: Personal care • education
- Founded: 1986; 40 years ago
- Founders: Jane Wurwand; Ray Wurwand
- Headquarters: Carson, California, United States
- Key people: Aurelian Lis (CEO)
- Products: Skin care
- Owner: Unilever
- Website: www.dermalogica.com

Dermalogica is an American personal care company headquartered in Carson, California. Its products include cleansers, exfoliants, toners, masques, eye treatments, and moisturizers, as well as an acne treatment line for teens. Dermalogica has primary operations in the United States, the United Kingdom, Canada, Australia, India, Pakistan, and Ireland, and is sold in more than 80 countries worldwide.

As of August 1, 2015, Dermalogica, Inc. operates as a subsidiary of Unilever.

== History ==
In 1983, Jane Wurwand, a tenured skin therapist and licensed instructor, arrived in Los Angeles, following a brief time in South Africa. Approximately six months earlier, her then-boyfriend (now-husband) South African Raymond Wurwand took a job as a sales representative for a company selling equipment to the skin care industry. Together, they hosted skin therapy classes in the company’s showroom to educate students and promote the equipment. Following the success of their educational programs, Jane and Ray Wurwand created a business plan to continue their courses. By the end of 1983, the couple had launched the school that became the first International Dermal Institute (IDI) in Marina Del Rey. Two years later, Wurwand set out to develop products free of common skin irritants, including lanolin, SD alcohol, mineral oil, artificial colors, and fragrances. This was inspired by student requests, as well as a lack of existing products that Jane Wurwand could use on her skin, which experienced dermatitis and chronic eczema.

Dermalogica was created and premiered in 1986 as a skin care line, sold in concept spaces and in authorized salons, spas, and beauty supply stores. As of 2013, Dermalogica has more than 100,000 trained skin therapists around the globe and 22 concept spaces in North America, Europe, Asia, Australia, Africa, and the Middle East; the concept spaces and/or hybrid learning centers worldwide are dedicated to bringing consumer and professional education, professional treatments, and retail sales together under one roof. Dermalogica continues to operate The International Dermal Institute (IDI), a provider of postgraduate skin care education. With 38 postgraduate training centers and 45 international affiliates, IDI trains more than 75,000 professional skin therapists every year. IDI is also responsible for the research and development of Dermalogica treatments and products.

== Controversy ==
In 2011, The Sunday Times published an article called "The Woman Who Started a Cult," referring to the brand's cult-like following and Germany's suspicion that Dermalogica was affiliated with Scientology. In the article, Jane Wurwand said, "We had to sign a document declaring we had never been affiliated with Scientology, because there were all these people smiling, saying the same thing so enthusiastically. They assumed we did a form of brainwashing. I suppose I can see why — we do talk about Dermalogica like a tribe on a mission."

== Awards and media ==
Dermalogica has won awards and been recognized by publications, including InStyle, Harper's Bazaar, New Woman, Beauty LaunchPad, Cosmetic Executive Women (CEW), Allure, American Spa, American Salon, Shecky's, Life & Style, The UK Beauty Awards, Vogue, Guild Awards of Excellence, and CoolBrands.
