= Lady's Choice =

Philippine condiment brand

- The logo of Lady's Choice.
- Product type: Condiment
- Current owner: Unilever
- Produced by: Unilever Philippines
- Country: Philippines
- Introduced: 1955; 71 years ago
- Markets: Philippines, Malaysia and Singapore
- Previous owners: California Manufacturing Company (Note: A joint venture between Ajinomoto and CPC International.)
- Ambassadors: Sharon Cuneta; Sarah Geronimo; Kris Aquino; Dimples Romana; Jose Mari Chan; Iya Villania; Drew Arellano
- Tagline: Bring out the Best (1968–1979); You've Got to be the Best/You'll Always Be The Best (1980–2013); Your Highest Pleasure (2002–2004); The Friedelicious Dip (2004–2006); Oh, the choices you can make! (2006–2007); Mom, you'll always be the best. (2013–2022); Real Meat, Real Love (2013–2014); Malaman-Linamnam (2014–2018); Meaty Busog-Sarap! (2022–present)
- Website: www.ladyschoice.com.ph

Lady's Choice is a spread and salad dressing condiment brand owned by Unilever. The brand was introduced in 1955 by California Manufacturing Company (CMC).

In 2000, Unilever Philippines acquired California Manufacturing Company from Ajinomoto and CPC International as a result of Unilever's acquisition of Bestfoods Corporation.

== Products ==
=== Current ===
- Lady's Choice Real Mayonnaise
- Lady's Choice Sandwich Spread
- Lady's Choice Salad Dressing
- Lady's Choice Ham Spread
- Lady's Choice Tuna Spread
- Lady's Choice Bacon Spread
- Lady's Choice Chicken Spread
- Lady's Choice Strawberry Jam (available in Malaysia and Singapore)
- Lady's Choice Choco Stripe Peanut Spread (available in Malaysia and Singapore)
- Lady's Choice Grape Stripe Peanut Spread (available in Malaysia and Singapore)
- Lady's Choice Caesar Dressing
- Lady's Choice Thousand Island Dressing
- Lady's Choice Ranch Dressing
- Lady's Choice Creamy Peanut Butter
- Lady's Choice Sweet & Creamy Peanut Butter
- Lady's Choice Super Chunk Peanut Butter

=== Former ===
- Lady's Choice Alsa Gulaman
- Lady's Choice Alsa Flan
- Lady's Choice Alsa Syrup
- Lady's Choice Alsa Ginatang Mais
- Lady's Choice Alsa Ginatang Munggo
- Lady's Choice Alsa Ginatang Sago
- Lady's Choice Margarine
- Lady's Choice Mixed Pickles
- Lady's Choice Fruit Preserves
- Lady's Choice Fruit Jelly
- Lady's Choice Fruit Juice Drink
- Lady's Choice Spaghetti
- Lady's Choice Spaghetti Meat Sauce
- Lady's Choice Pure Corn Oil
- Lady's Choice Pure Soya Oil
- Lady's Choice Banana Tomato Blend Ketchup
- Lady's Choice Meat Tenderizer
- Lady's Choice Black Pepper
- Lady's Choice Curry Powder
- Lady's Choice White Pepper
- Lady's Choice Flavor All Seasoning
- Lady's Choice Salt
- Lady's Choice Vienna Sausage
- Lady's Choice Roast Beef Spread
- Lady's Choice Liver Spread
