= Shaastra =

Annual technical festival of the Indian Institute of Technology Madras

Shaastra is the annual technical festival of the Indian Institute of Technology Madras (IITM), Chennai, India. The Sanskrit word ‘Shaastra’ means a subject of study/branch of knowledge and the festival accordingly consists of various engineering, science and technology competitions, summits, lectures, video conferences, exhibitions, demonstrations and workshops. The festival is traditionally held over four days and four nights during the first week of January. It has so far seen twenty six editions, having started in its current avatar in the year 2000. Shaastra attracts participation from all over India, and seeks to provide collegiate students with a platform to showcase their scientific and engineering talents. Shaastra is entirely student managed and is the first such event in the world to be ISO 9001:2015 certified for implementing a Quality Management System. It is one of Asia's largest completely student-run techno-managerial festivals.

== History ==
In 1996, Prof. R Natarajan took over as director and instituted several committees to study several ways of improving IIT Madras. One of his committees, the committee on new mechanisms of Teacher Learning Interactions, was tasked with coming up with ways of inspiring students. This committee, headed by Prof. Ajit Kumar Kolar, came up with a suggestion to create a technology festival in IIT Madras. On the behest of Prof. U R Rao, chairman of the board of governors of the institute, in 1997, several students came together and staged 'Pragmaa', a technical festival, in 1997, and then in 1999.

Students applied for and took on the role of Coordinators for various events. A set of colleges around the country was targeted and the amount required to run the event was raised through sponsorship agreements. The first edition of Shaastra was thus planned and took place starting 9 March 2000. Since then, Shaastra has continued to expand year by year, and has established itself as one of the premiermost technical fest in India. The 2020 edition of Shaastra, was held in January, with the theme 'Parsec to Planck'. The 2020 edition of Shaastra saw prominent speakers including Dr. V.K. Saraswat, Suresh Prabhu, Robin Li, Arunachalam Muruganathan and Dr. C. Rangarajan. The last two editions of Shaastra, in 2021 & 2022, were held completely virtually keeping in mind the pandemic restrictions. These editions featured several prominent speakers gracing the fest, including Dr. Shashi Tharoor, Dr. Raghuram Rajan, Ms. Carolina Marin & Dr. John L. Hennessy.
