= Breeze detergent =

Brand of laundry detergent manufactured by Unilever

Breeze
- Product type: Laundry detergent
- Current owner: Unilever
- Country: United States
- Introduced: 1947; 79 years ago
- Related brands: OMO, Surf Excel, Skip
- Markets: Worldwide

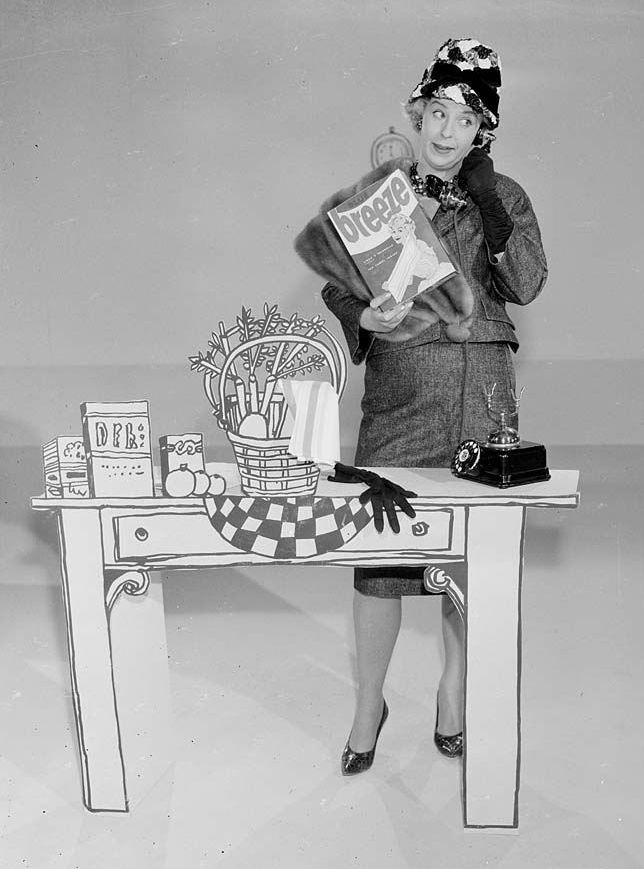
Filming a Breeze advertisement in 1960

Breeze is a brand of laundry detergent manufactured by Unilever that is currently marketed as the counterpart of OMO detergent for the Philippines, Singapore, Malaysia and Thailand markets.

== History ==
Breeze was introduced by Lever Brothers Company in the United States in 1947 as a soapless cleansing agent. In April 1947, Breeze was launched in six cities in the Midwestern United States. The product had a capital investment of $2,000,000.

Breeze began with an advertising campaign in seventeen newspapers, covering six markets. The Federal Advertising Agency was responsible for advertising coordination. In 1956, a box of king-size Breeze was offered with a free Cannon Mills Company bath towel and a fifty-cent voucher for buying, in Albuquerque, New Mexico.

A commercial aired nationally as part of the CBS Television Network program Love is a Many Splendored Thing in December 1967 also featured the "free towel with every box" offer, and this commercial can be seen online on various websites such as the Internet Archive.
