= Wheel (detergent) =

Brand of laundry detergent

- Product type: Laundry detergent
- Current owner: Unilever
- Country: Philippines
- Introduced: 1952; 74 years ago
- Markets: India, Bangladesh

Wheel is a brand of laundry soap and detergent owned by Unilever. The brand was introduced in the Philippines in 1952 as a laundry soap by Philippine Refining Company (now Unilever Philippines) under the brand name Superwheel. The brand was introduced in India in 1985 as a laundry detergent by Hindustan Unilever Limited.
