= Villy Custom =

American bicycle brand

- Industry: Bicycles
- Founded: 2009; 17 years ago
- Founder: Fleetwood Hicks
- Headquarters: Dallas, Texas
- Area served: United States
- Products: Bicycles and accessories
- Website: villycustoms.com

Villy Custom is an American lifestyle brand specializing in a luxury custom fashion designed cruiser bicycles for adults. Based in Dallas, the company was founded and is privately owned by entrepreneur Fleetwood Hicks, a former menswear fashion designer, and health enthusiast, and it was chosen by Entrepreneur Magazine as one of the 100 Most Brilliant Business Ideas of 2010. The company also aired in season 3 of ABC's show Shark Tank according to WFAA

== History ==
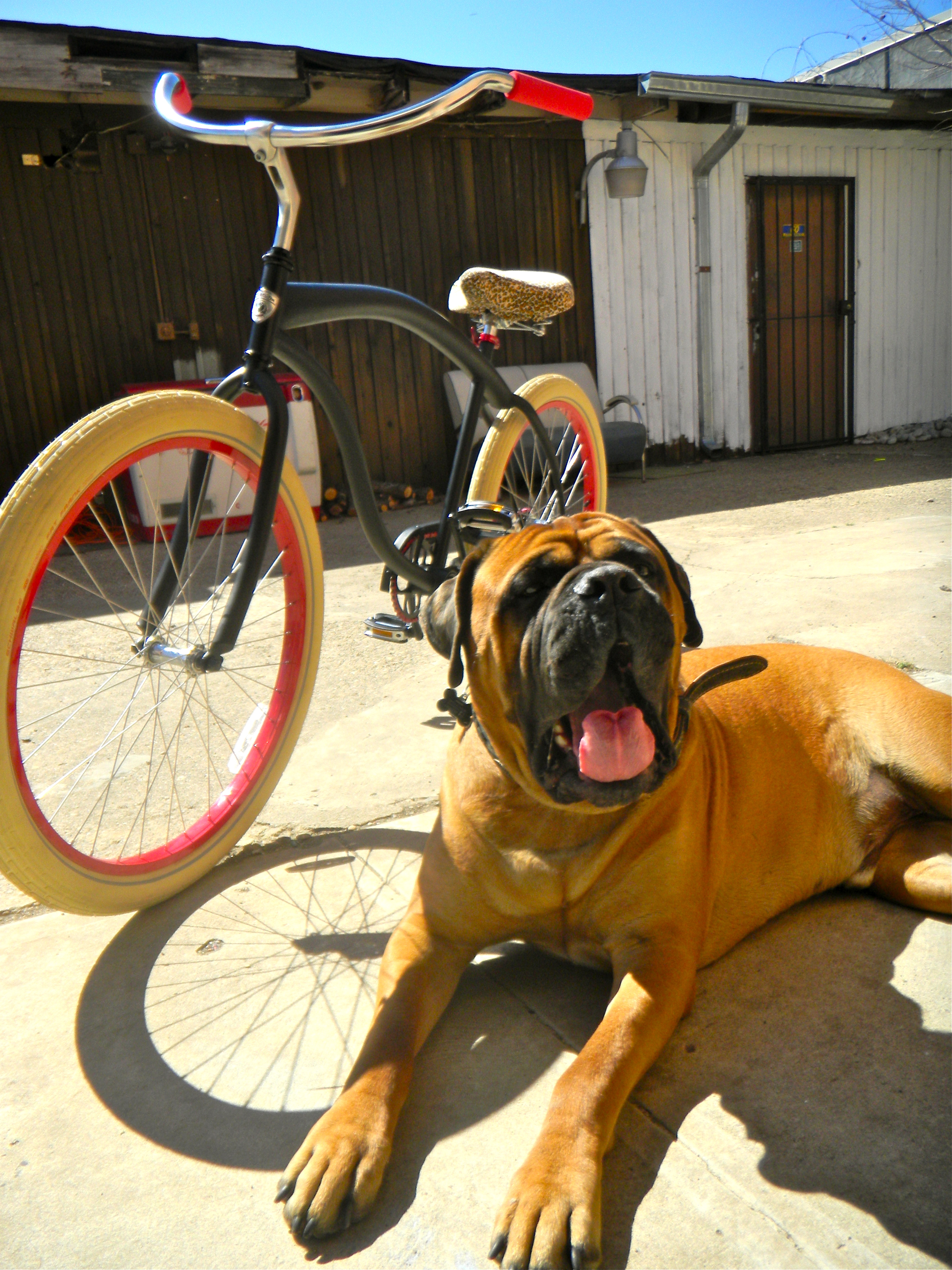
DeVille "Villy", Villy Custom Mascot

In 2006, Hicks discovered beach cruiser bikes riding on Venice Beach while in Los Angeles on a business trip. After renting a beach cruiser for a scheduled one-hour ride, he brought the rental back six hours later and was hooked. Relishing the simplicity, comfort, and style of the bike and the fact that you could wear street clothes and look stylish riding. Two years later, Villy Custom was founded in 2008 and began as a brick-and-mortar retail store (selected by Daily Candy as “Sweetest Things” 2009). Specializing in sales of Felt Cruisers, Hawk Classic Cruiser bikes, specialty accessories, and apparel. After experimenting with minor bike customizations, Hicks realized he could infuse fashion, texture, and unique color combinations to create a luxury fashion bicycle company that is customizable. The icon of the brand is the owner's bullmastiff dog, named DeVille. The brand is known for its unexpected product features, such as powder-coated handlebars, neck stems, seat posts, seat post clamps, fender braces, seat hardware, and wheels in a multitude of colors.

== Innovation ==
Villy Custom is a “fashion” brand of cruiser bike. Villy Custom uses an e-commerce platform with a 3D Flash-based user interface, allowing customers to change, add and remove features and colors. In June 2010, Entrepreneur magazine awarded Villy Custom with one of the 100 Most Brilliant Business Ideas of the year.

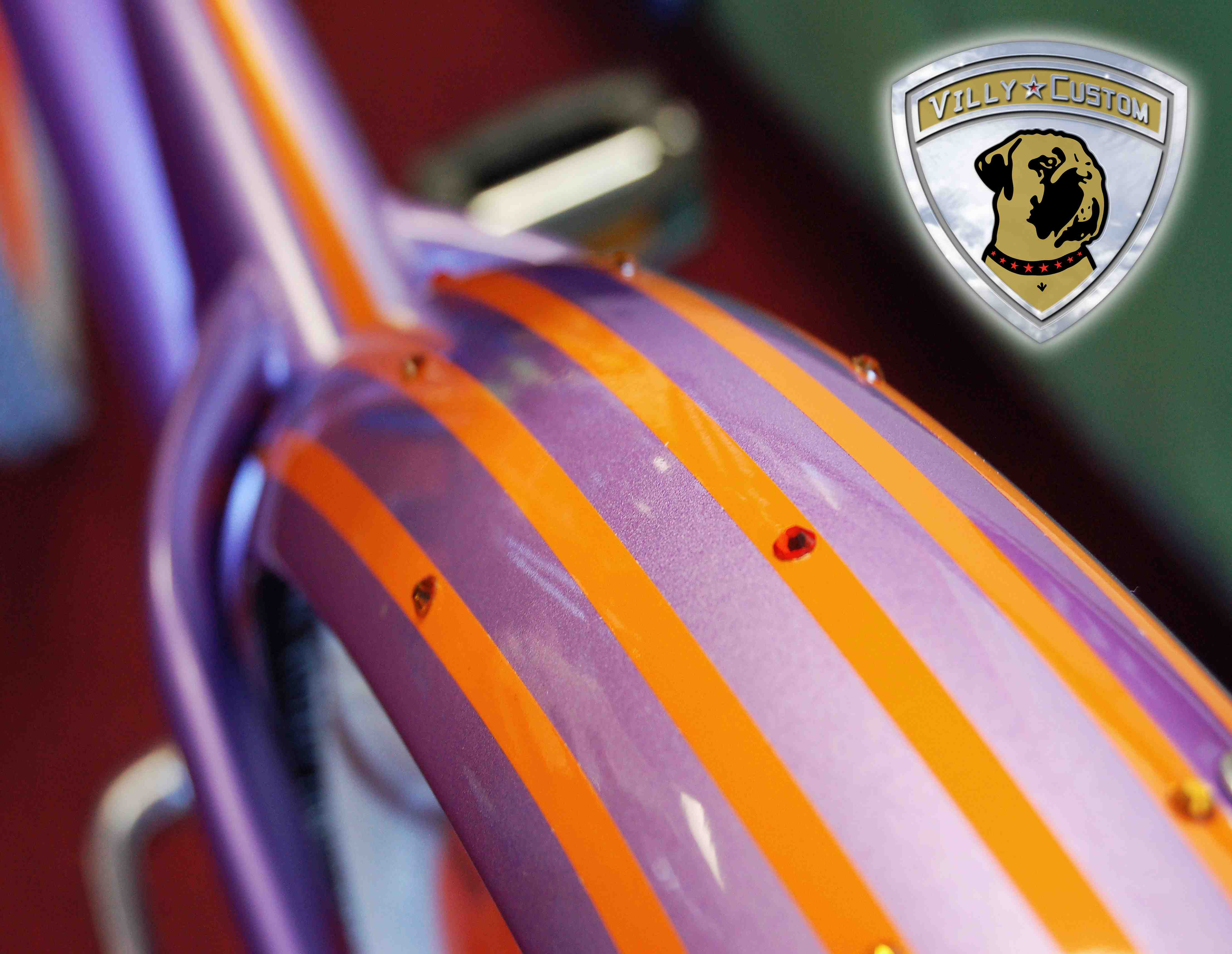
Orange Villy Custom fender

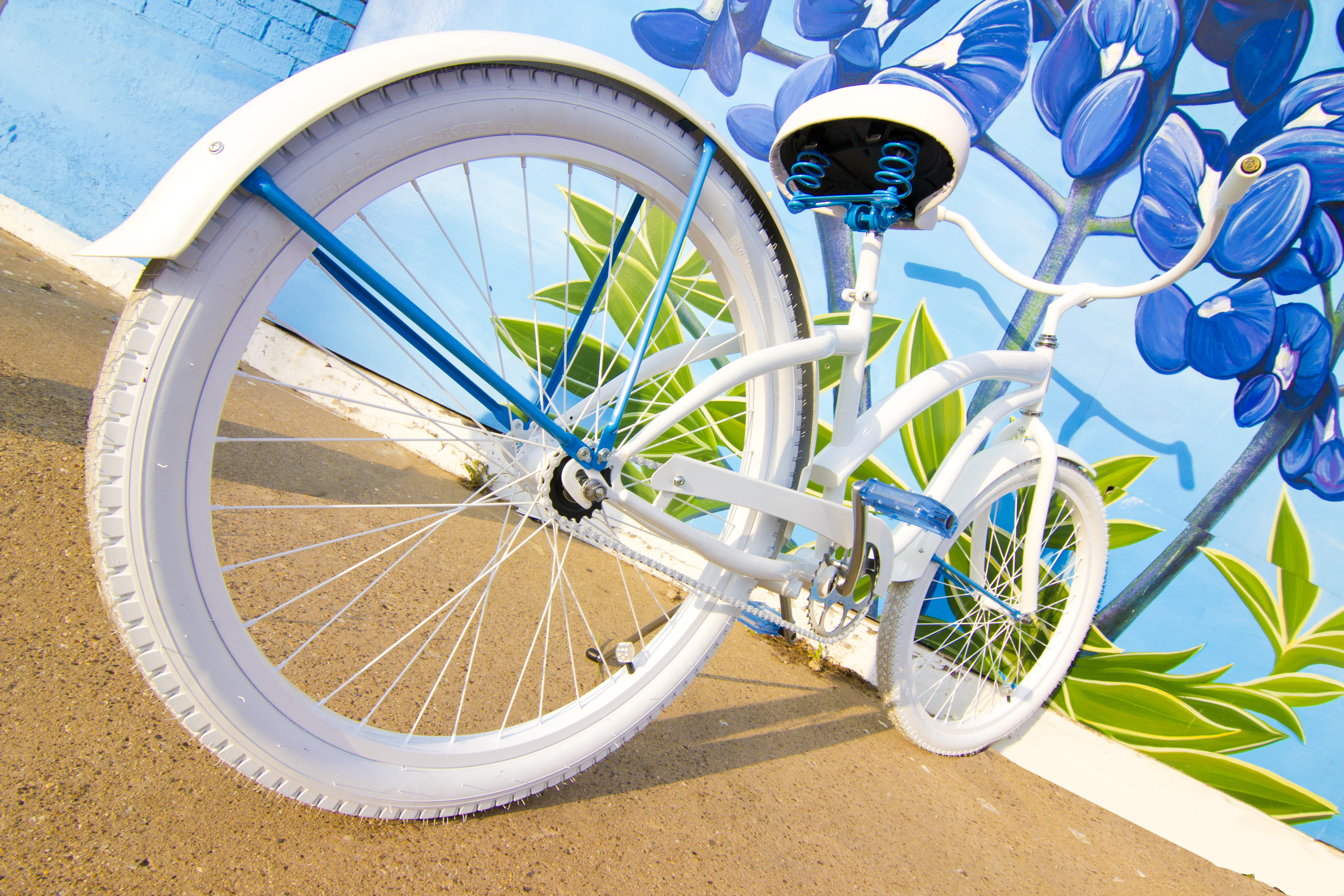
One of Villy's Elite Edition bicycles

== Company headquarters ==
The company's warehouse and assemblage facility is located in downtown Dallas, Texas. Villy Custom also has a few bicycles showcased at the Omni Dallas Hotel.

== Mentions in the press ==
1. Selected by Entrepreneur magazine as one of the 100 Most Brilliant Business Ideas for 2010 (June 2010 edition)
2. Feb 2011 featured on national T.V. by NBC's First Look
3. Full feature by the Dallas Morning News as the Sunday “Entrepreneur” feature (Sept. 2010) business section
4. AOL National feature story
5. Modern Luxury magazine (April 2011 issue, Page 121)
