= Evermark =

American personal care company

- Type: Private
- Industry: Personal care products
- Predecessors: Elida Beauty; Suave Brands Company
- Founded: 2023; 3 years ago (as Suave Brands Company)
- Headquarters: Hackensack, New Jersey, U.S.
- Area served: Worldwide
- Key people: Daniel Alter (CEO)
- Products: ChapStick, Q-Tips, Suave, Pond's
- Owner: Yellow Wood Partners LLC

Evermark is an American personal care company formed in January 2026 by the merger of Elida Beauty and the Suave Brands Company, both of which were owned and managed by private equity firm Yellow Wood Partners.

== History ==
=== Suave Brands Company ===
In February 2023, Unilever sold the North American ownership of the Suave brand to Yellow Wood Partners, a private equity firm which focuses exclusively on investing in the consumer market. Suave Brands Company was then established as a standalone portfolio company, with Unilever retaining the rights to the brand internationally.

In January 2024, Haleon sold the rights to the ChapStick brand to Suave Brands Company for $150 million.

=== Elida Beauty ===
In April 2021, Unilever established Elida Beauty as a standalone beauty business, which owned and managed a number of the company's non-core heritage brands including Brut, Q-tips, Noxema, TIGI, VO5, Pond's, and Elida.

In December 2023, Elida Beauty was sold to Yellow Wood Partners following their acquisition of Suave earlier in the year. Reliance Consumer Products, a subsidiary of Indian conglomerate Reliance Industries, would purchase the Brylcreem, Matey, Badedas, and Toni & Guy brands from Elida Beauty in January 2026.

== Brands ==
- Alberto Balsam
- Brut
- Caress
- ChapStick
- Impulse
- Monsavon
- Noxzema
- Pond's
- Q-Tips
- St Ives
- Suave (North America only)
- Tigi
  - Bed Head
- Timotei
- VO5
