= Heavy Metal: How a Global Corporation Poisoned Kodaikanal =

2023 book by Ameer Shahul

- Cover of the 1st edition
- Author: Ameer Shahul
- Language: English
- Subject: Industrial pollution
- Genre: Non-fiction
- Publisher: Pan Macmillan in India
- Publication date: 10 February 2023
- Publication place: India
- Media type: Print (hardcover)
- Pages: 416 pp (First Edition)
- ISBN: 978-9390742660

Heavy Metal: How a Global Corporation Poisoned Kodaikanal is a non-fiction book by Indian author Ameer Shahul, published by Pan Macmillan in February 2023.

The book is about the environmental issues faced by the local population in the Indian hill station of Kodaikanal after Mercury poisoning from a thermometer-making factory which is widely known as Kodaikanal mercury poisoning. It narrates the unfolding of the accident and the consequences over a period of time, and the confrontations and litigations by the local community with the polluter Unilever, pursued with the help of local, national and global environmentalists.

Heavy Metal won the 'Book of the Year' award in 2024 from the Green Literature Festival, under the 'Green Business' category. The book was also longlisted for the Tata Literature Live! Literary Awards 2023 under the Best Non-Fiction First Book category.

== Background ==
In March 2001, a large quantity of mercury waste was uncovered at a local scrapyard in Kodaikanal, Tamil Nadu by local environmentalists, the source of which was soon traced to the nearby factory of Unilever. The Hindustan Unilever (HUL) thermometer plant had been letting out mercury vapours into the atmosphere and disposing of mercury-laden waste to local scrap dealers. The local community, aided by Greenpeace, forced Unilever to shut down the factory and clean up the scrapyard site. Many workers of the factory complained of illnesses in the following years, and by some accounts, 28 people died, after alleged exposure to the toxic heavy metal, mercury at the workplace.

The efforts to cleanup the factory site moved from the Madras High Court, to the National Green Tribunal and ultimately concluded with an order from the Supreme Court of India in 2019. A long legal battle pursued by the ex-workers of the factory ended with a sealed out-of-court settlement in 2016. Heavy Metal: How a Global Corporation Poisoned Kodaikanal chronicles this incident and its aftermath from the author's perspective as a Greenpeace campaigner.

== Reception ==
The book was launched in India by Erik Solheim, the former executive director of United Nations Environment Programme and former Norway Environment Minister in Chennai on March 25, 2023.

In a review, the Hindu Business Line suggested that the Kodai case can be 'a good pointer to be on our guard and save the environment'. The book is a compelling read and Shahul must be commended for documenting an eminently forgettable environmental blot that had a tragic impact on people’s health. It was also positively reviewed by The Indian Express, Open magazine, Malayala Manorama, Financial Express (India), Hindustan Times, and The New Indian Express.
