= Hydrated silica =

Chemical compound

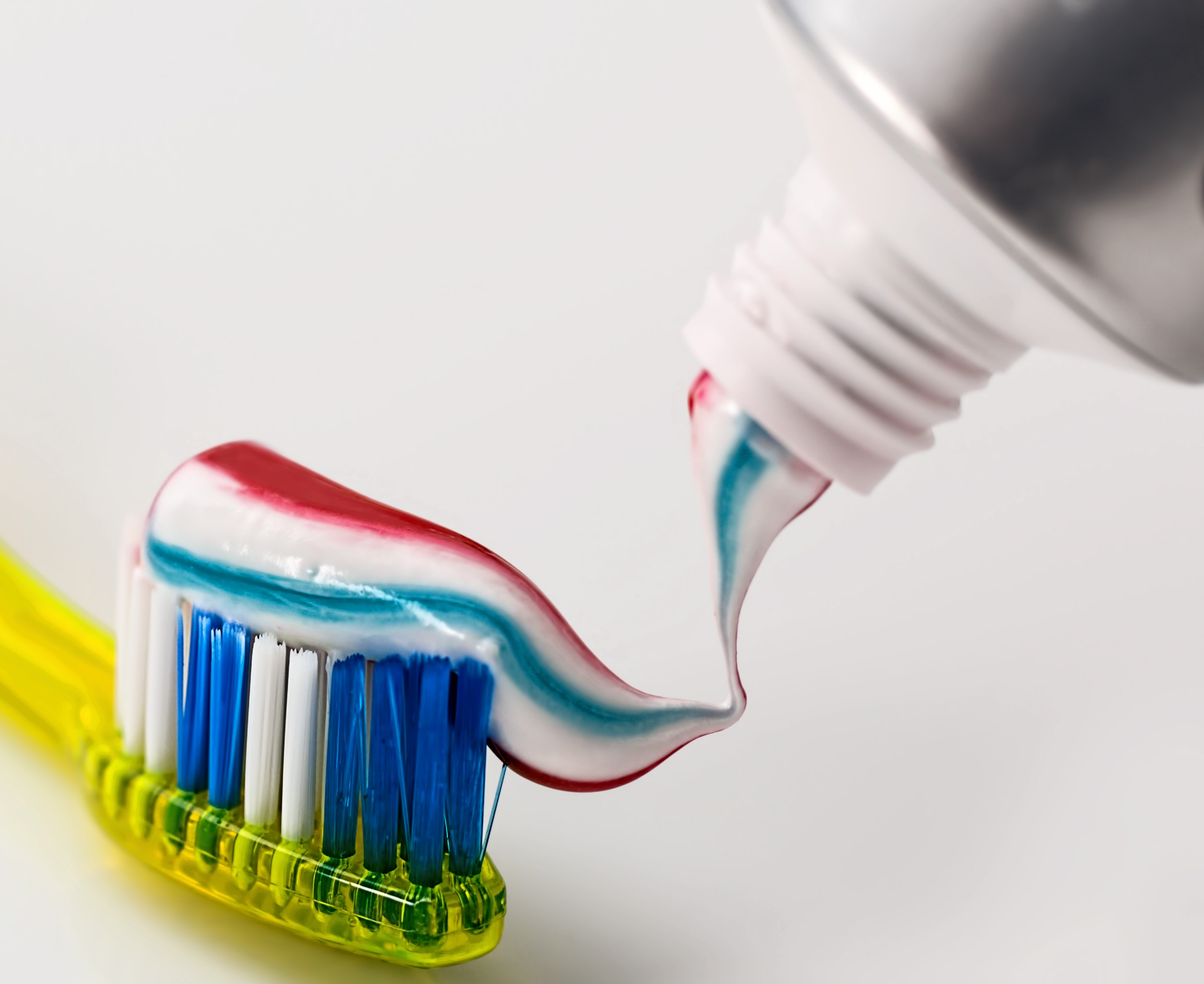
Hydrated silica is a primary ingredient in modern toothpastes, serving as a high performance abrasive during cleaning.

Hydrated silica is a form of silicon dioxide, which has a variable amount of water in the formula. When dissolved in water, it is usually known as silicic acid. It is found in nature as opal, and in the cell walls of diatoms – hence is found in diatomaceous earth. It is also synthetically manufactured for use in toothpaste as an abrasive to assist in cleaning. Hydrated silica can be dehydrated to produce silica gel, which is used as a desiccant. It is also used in various paints and varnishes and in the production of beer.

== Use in toothpaste ==
Diatomaceous earth, originally mined as "tooth powder" is a naturally occurring hydrated silica. As a fine gel abrasive, frequently combined with softer calcium carbonate (from chalk) it helps to remove plaque. Milled to a slightly larger size, the grains are more aggressive and are used in tooth bleaching formulations. Hydrated silica is a useful abrasive in toothpastes because it does not chemically interact with other active ingredients, especially sodium fluoride.

== Nature ==
Hydrated silicas can form in nature through biotic processes primarily involving benthic microorganism activity in the oceans. However, there are several abiotic processes that form hydrated silicas, such as precipitating out of solution, forming a diagenetic alteration product, or replacing pre-existing minerals in sedimentary rocks.

In its pure form, as manufactured for toothpaste, it is an odorless, tasteless, white, gelatinous substance, which is chemically inert. One of the primary industrial methods to acquire hydrated silica is through a sol-gel process.

Hydrated silicas can be categorized into three main categories based on differences in crystallinity:

1. Hydrated silicate glass (Lowest crystallinity)
2. Opal
3. Microcrystalline quartz (Highest crystallinity)

One of the most common ways to detect and identify hydrated silicas in laboratory is through near infrared and thermal infrared spectroscopy.

== Chemical formula ==
Chemical Formula:

SiO_{2} · nH_{2}O
1 SiO_{2} + 1 H_{2}O → H_{2}SiO_{3}
1 SiO_{2} + 2 H_{2}O → H_{4}SiO_{4} [also known as Si(OH)_{4}]
2 SiO_{2} + 1 H_{2}O → H_{2}Si_{2}O_{5}
2 SiO_{2} + 3 H_{2}O → H_{6}Si_{2}O_{7}
3 SiO_{2} + 2 H_{2}O → H_{4}Si_{3}O_{8}
3 SiO_{2} + 4 H_{2}O → H_{8}Si_{3}O_{10}
4 SiO_{2} + 1 H_{2}O → H_{2}Si_{4}O_{9}

Hydrated silicas exhibit a trend of decreasing bonded water molecules as the crystallinity of the silica molecule increases, with microcrystalline quartz's typically containing the least water content and macrocrystaline quartz having negligible water.

== Flame retardant ==
Hydrated silica compounds, such as hydrated silica aluminate (HSA), can be combined with traditional flame retardants, such as magnesium hydroxide and aluminium hydroxide, to increase their effectivity. A hydrated silica compound's effectiveness as a flame retardant is dependent upon the presence of chemically bonded transition metals, commonly iron and titanium.

== Safety ==
Hydrated silica is listed by the US Food and Drug Administration as "Generally Recognized as Safe."
