= Sir Kensington's =

American food brand owned by Unilever

- Type: Subsidiary
- Industry: Food processing
- Founded: 2010; 16 years ago
- Founders: Mark Ramadan; Scott Norton; Brandon Child; Win Bennett
- Fate: Acquired by Unilever
- Headquarters: New York City, New York, United States
- Area served: North America
- Key people: Mark Ramadan (ex-CEO & co-founder); Scott Norton (CEO & co-founder); Brandon Child (co-founder); Win Bennett (co-founder)
- Products: Condiments
- Website: www.sirkensingtons.com

Sir Kensington's is an American food company with headquarters in New York City, New York. It was founded by Mark Ramadan, Scott Norton, Brandon Child, and Win Bennett. The company produces Non-GMO Project Verified condiments including ketchup, mustard, mayonnaise, ranch dressing, and "Fabanaise", a vegan mayo whose name is a portmanteau of the substitute ingredient aquafaba and mayonnaise which it mimics.

On April 20, 2017, Unilever announced its acquisition of Sir Kensington's. The company remains independently led and managed as a wholly owned subsidiary.

== Background ==
Sir Kensington's Ketchup was first created in 2008 by Scott Norton, Mark Ramadan, Brandon Child, and Win Bennett. After two years of development, the product was commercially launched, featuring less sugar and salt than standard ketchup, and no high-fructose corn syrup. The brand is named after a fictitious British merchant, who they created as a mascot to represent the company's "quirky sensibility". In an interview with Bond Street, Ramadan said, "Sir Kensington was the character we created that reflected the never-ending search for something better. By making him British, it was sort of tongue-in-cheek, in that Americans look to the British for fancy things like high tea and scones."

In May 2010, Ramadan and Norton became the company's first full-time employees. That year, they sold 10,000 jars in stores including Dean & DeLuca and Williams Sonoma. Since then, the company has expanded to offer Non-GMO Project verified and USDA-certified organic products including mayonnaise, mustard, and vegan mayonnaise. The company financed its early growth by raising $8.5 million from a Belgian private equity firm named Verlinvest and other individual investors.

== Products ==
In 2010, Sir Kensington's launched its first product: ketchup. The ketchup is packaged in glass and plastic bottles of various sizes. It offers "classic" and "spicy" ketchup varieties.

The company introduced mayonnaise in May 2013, producing in classic, avocado oil, organic, Sriracha, chipotle, special sauce, and dijonnaise varieties. It also offers mustard in spicy brown, dijon, yellow, and honey mustard varieties, as well as ranch dressing in classic, avocado oil, buffalo, and pizza flavors.

In 2016, the company launched "Fabanaise", a vegan mayonnaise, made with a natural egg replacement, called aquafaba. Aquafaba is the brine water that naturally occurs when cooking chickpeas.

== Awards and recognition ==
Sir Kensington's Fabanaise received the 2017 FABI award at the National Restaurant Association show in Chicago, Illinois. as well as the 2017 NEXTY award at Expo West for product innovation.

The brand was awarded the Sofi award at the Fancy Food Show in 2015 for Special Sauce, and was a 2016 finalist for Chipotle Fabanaise. Sir Kensington's Spicy Brown Mustard and Yellow Mustard have won Gold medal and Silver medals respectively at the Worldwide Mustard Competition organized by the National Mustard Museum.

== Fries of New York ==
In November 2014, Sir Kensington's created a pop-up French fry museum, entitled Fries of New York. The exhibition featured 100 French fries from New York City restaurants preserved in resin alongside materials on the history of French fries and accompanying condiments.

== Acquisition ==
On April 20, 2017, Unilever announced its acquisition of Sir Kensington's for an undisclosed sum.
