= Suave (brand) =

Brand of personal care products

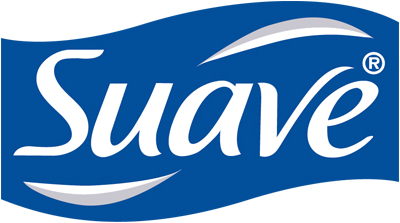
- Product type: Personal care
- Current owner: Evermark; (2023–present; North America); Unilever; (international)
- Country: United States
- Introduced: 1937; 89 years ago
- Markets: United States, Argentina, Mexico, Canada, Brazil
- Previous owners: Helene Curtis Industries, Inc.; Unilever (1996–2023; North America)
- Website: www.suave.com

Suave is a brand name based in Chicago, Illinois, used by the Unilever company in the United States, Argentina, Brazil, Mexico and Canada. Targeting discount stores, the brand represents more than 100 products, including shampoo, lotions, soaps and deodorant.

On May 9, 2023, the brand's North American rights were acquired by Yellow Wood Partners LLC and became controlled through a new entity, Suave Brands Company (SBC). Unilever still holds rights to the brand internationally.

== History ==
Suave is a company that was started by National Mineral Company in the United States in 1937 as a hair tonic. The brand was later acquired by Helene Curtis Industries, Inc. which, in the 1970s, started expanding the Suave name beyond hair care into other areas. The brand targeted discount stores and grew its offerings to more than 100 products including shampoo, lotions, soaps and deodorant.

In 1996, Helene Curtis—and thus, Suave—was acquired by Unilever. Currently [when?] based in Chicago, the brand name is currently [when?] being used in the countries of the United States, Argentina, Brazil, Mexico and Canada.
