= RFM Corporation =

Philippine food and beverage company

- Formerly: Republic Flour Mills, Inc. (1957–1977)
- Type: Public
- Traded as: PSE: RFM
- Industry: Food processing, beverages
- Founded: August 16, 1957; 69 years ago
- Founder: Salvador Z. Araneta; José N. Concepcion, Sr; B.J. Server; Albino Z. SyCip; Zoilo Alberto; Francisco D. Gamboa; Edward Miller Grimm; Leonardo Eugenio; David SyCip; Charles Parsons
- Headquarters: RFM Corporate Center, Pioneer Street, Mandaluyong, Metro Manila, Philippines
- Area served: Worldwide
- Key people: José María A. Concepcion III (Chairman, President and CEO); Ernest Fritz Server (Vice Chairman)
- Products: Wheat flour, cake mixes, pasta, UHT milk, ice cream, non-alcoholic beverages
- Revenue: ▲ ₱20.681 billion (2023)
- Operating income: ▲ ₱1.643 billion (2023)
- Net income: ▲ ₱1.266 billion (2023)
- Total assets: ▲ ₱23,008 billion (2023)
- Total equity: ▲ ₱14,613 billion (2023)
- Number of employees: 523 (2024)
- Subsidiaries: Unilever-RFM Ice Cream, Inc. (Note: Joint venture with Unilever, through its Philippine subsidiary.); Interbake Commissary Corporation; Filipinas Water Bottling Company; RFM Insurance Brokers, Inc. Rizal Lighterage Corporation
- Website: rfmfoods.com

RFM Corporation (PSE: RFM) is a publicly listed food and beverage company in the Philippines. RFM is a manufacturer of flour and flour-based products, milk, juice drinks, and ice cream. As of June 2013, RFM had an asset base of P12 billion and a total market capitalization of P17.1 billion.

== History ==
Its founders included Salvador Z. Araneta, José N. Concepcion Sr., B.J. Server, Albino Z. SyCip, Zoilo Alberto, Francisco D. Gamboa, Edward Miller Grimm, Leonardo Eugenio, David SyCip and Charles "Chick" Parsons. In 1973, RFM entered into an exclusive licensing agreement with Swift & Company to use the brand "Swift" for its meat processing business (in 1987, RFM purchased ownership rights for its exclusive use in the Philippines). For the next 15 years, RFM concentrated on growing its established core businesses and also introduced other grocery products, such as cake mixes, hotcake mixes, and ingredient mixes.

As it entered the 1990s, RFM began acquiring of a number of local companies and established partnerships with foreign companies.

In 1994, RFM divested its interest in hog operations and the poultry operations became known as Swift Foods Inc. (SFI). In 1995, RFM Properties and Holdings, Inc. was established to consolidate RFM's real estate assets as well as break into the property development business.

Between 1995 and 2000, RFM briefly ventured into noodle manufacturing, tuna processing, bakeshop business with the acquisition of the Rolling Pin trademark, food franchising (Little Caesars Pizza and Dairy Queen) and thrift banking (Consumer Bank).

In 1999, RFM formed a partnership with Unilever (through its Philippine subsidiary) to produce Selecta ice cream under the joint-venture company, Selecta Walls Inc., (now Unilever-RFM Ice Cream Inc.).

In 2001, RFM sold its soft drink subsidiary Cosmos Bottling Corporation ("Pop Cola" brand) to Coca-Cola Bottlers Philippines Inc. (now known as Coca-Cola Beverages Philippines Inc.), from San Miguel Corporation and The Coca-Cola Company. Cosmos continued to be listed in the Philippine Stock Exchange until 2013. Thus, unfortunately making sure that Cosmos didn't get to see its centenary which would have happened in 2018.

In 2003, RFM spun off Swift Foods Inc., which formerly operated RFM's Swift poultry business, to become a separately owned company.

By the end of the first decade of the 2000s, RFM significantly reduced its holdings in Philtown Properties, Inc. after 66% of the outstanding shares were declared as property dividends in 2008 and 15% in 2009.

== Recent developments ==
In November 2012, RFM sold its Swift processed meat business to the Pacific Meat Company, Inc. (now Century Pacific Food, Inc.) RFM said the transaction's total value could reach between P800 million and P850 million.

In January 2014, RFM acquired the Royal pasta brand from Unilever Philippines for $47.8 million (around P2.1 billion). RFM's Fiesta brand was then the top pasta brand in the Philippines, while the Royal brand came second.

== Brands ==
Bulk flour:

- Republic Special
- Cinderella
- Altar Bread
- Milenyo
- Hi-Pro Majestic
- Señorita

Cake mixes:

- White King

Pasta:

- Fiesta
- Royal

Beverages:

- Sunkist juice

Refrigerated margarine:

- Butterfresh

Ice cream (Unilever-RFM Ice Cream Inc.; joint-venture with Unilever Philippines):

- Selecta
- Selecta Cornetto
- Selecta Magnum

UHT Milk:

- Selecta
- Selecta Moo

== Corporate social responsibility ==
RFM Foundation Inc. is the social development arm of the company. Among its notable projects are the Ten Outstanding Students of the Philippines and Project Pagsulong.

The Ten Outstanding Students of the Philippines seeks to honor students who made excellent academic performances and their contributions to society.

Project Pagsulong invites young Filipinos to form a team and come up with innovative business ideas good enough to stand against proposals from other teams, as well as viable enough to provide real-life solutions for alleviating poverty.

== See also ==
- Pop Cola Panthers
