= Lux (soap) =

Beauty brand marketed by Unilever

- Product type: Personal care
- Current owner: Unilever
- Produced by: Hindustan Unilever; Unilever Sri Lanka; Unilever Pakistan; Unilever Bangladesh Limited
- Country: United Kingdom
- Introduced: 1899; 127 years ago
- Markets: Worldwide
- Website: lux.com

Lux is a global personal care brand developed by Unilever.

Lux is marketed primarily in South Asian countries, such as India, Bangladesh, Pakistan, Sri Lanka and Nepal. It is also marketed in Malaysia, Brazil, Japan, Thailand, the Middle East and South Africa.

== History ==
=== Origins and history ===
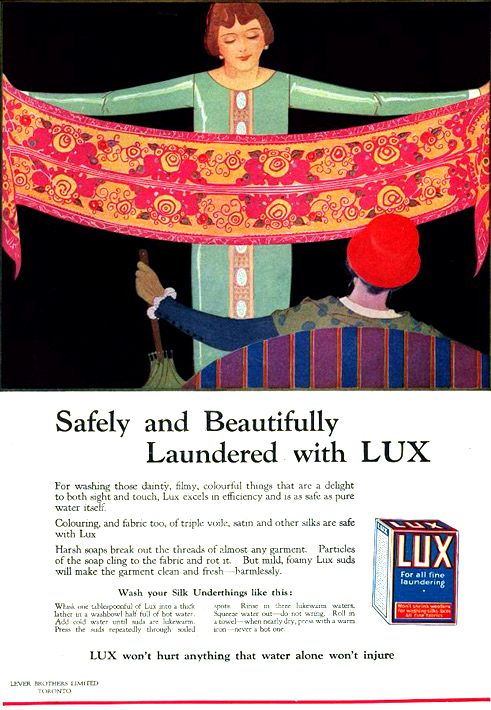
Lux Print ads – Early 20s

The brand was founded by the firm Lever Brothers, now known as Unilever, in 1899.

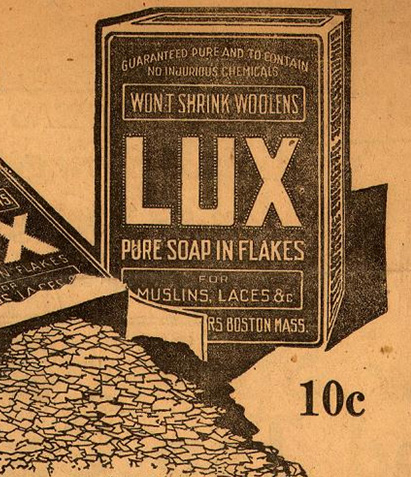
Lux beginnings

=== Advertising history ===
Lux Soap was introduced to America in 1925 by the Lever Brothers. It was a white soap packaged in pastel colors designed to be comparable to the finer French soaps, but more affordable. Once Lux Soap began its national campaign in 1926, it was also advertised for men and children. The Thompson agency began a campaign in 1928 to get endorsements from Hollywood actresses by sending 425 actresses cases of Lux Soap. It received 414 endorsements in return, leading them to claim that 9 out of 10 stars in Hollywood use Lux Soap. Among the actresses who participated in the campaign was Louise Brooks, whose ads ran between 1928 and 1931.

In 1933, advertisements claimed that Lux Soap was used by 686 out of 694 more well-known actresses. Lux Soap's Hollywood campaign along with its many other advertising efforts, would assist Lux Soap in becoming a worldwide leader in soap sales. As the focus of advertising shifted from the use of Hollywood starlets to a focus on everyday women, Lux Soap declined in sales and was removed from the shelves in the 1990s. Lever Brothers shifted their focus to another soap, Dove.

Lux Soap followed Colonial Great Britain to Zimbabwe, Africa, in the 1920s, but it took until the mid-20th century before Africans became familiar with toilet soap, and few used it. In the 1940s Lever Brothers began mass advertising for Lux, introducing their product as a soap associated with glamour and intelligence, and started using existing advertisements of international celebrities endorsing their products. Lever Brothers began to offer different colored bars other than white and used depictions of African people with slogans that insinuated intelligent people used only Lux Soap. In the 1960s and 1970s Lux Soap advertising shifted back to emphasizing glamour but this time used local models and singers instead of international stars.

== See also ==
- Lux Radio Theatre
