= Corporate accountability =

Financial or societal consequences for company activity

Corporate accountability is the acknowledgement and assumption of responsibility for the consequences of a company's actions. It can be defined in narrowly financial terms, e.g. for a business to meet certain standards or address the regulatory requirements of its business activities. Corporate accountability may also be applied more broadly, such as expectations for a publicly traded company to be accountable to its employees and local community rather than focusing exclusively on earning profits in the short-term for the benefit of its shareholders.

== See also ==
- Environmental, social and corporate governance
- Corporate social responsibility
- Corporate crime
