= Pond's =

Beauty product brand

- Product type: Beauty products
- Current owner: Evermark
- Country: United States
- Introduced: 1846; 180 years ago
- Markets: Worldwide
- Previous owners: Unilever
- Website: www.ponds.com

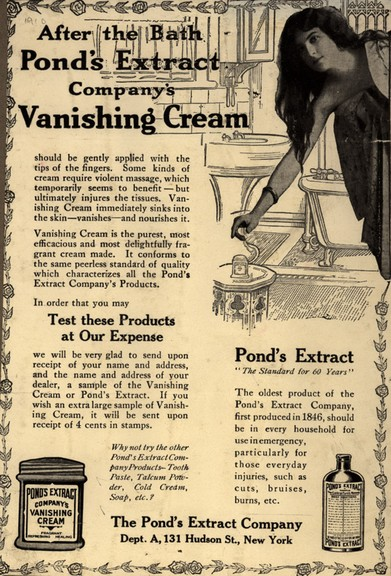
Pond's print advertisement for vanishing cream, 1910

Pond's is an American brand of beauty and health care products, currently owned by Evermark.

== History ==
Pond's Cream was invented in the United States as a patent medicine by pharmacist Theron T. Pond (1800–1852) of Utica, New York, in 1846. Pond created an extract from witch hazel that he discovered could heal small cuts and other ailments. The product was named Golden Treasure. After Pond died, it would soon be known as Pond's Extract.

In 1849, the T. T. Pond Company was formed with Pond and other investors. Soon after, he sold his portion of the company because of failing health. He died in 1852. In 1914, the company was incorporated under the name Pond's Extract Company.

The company then moved to Connecticut, establishing its manufacturing center there. Later it moved its sales office to New York City.

In 1886, Pond's began to advertise nationally. It advertised under the name of Pond's Healing until 1910.

By the 20th century, the company's main emphasis was selling cosmetics products. Pond's Vanishing Cream and the Pond's Cold Cream marked the entrance of Pond's products into the facial care industry. Today Pond's products are sold around the world. The largest markets are in Spain and in Asia, including India, Japan and Thailand.

=== 1910s ===
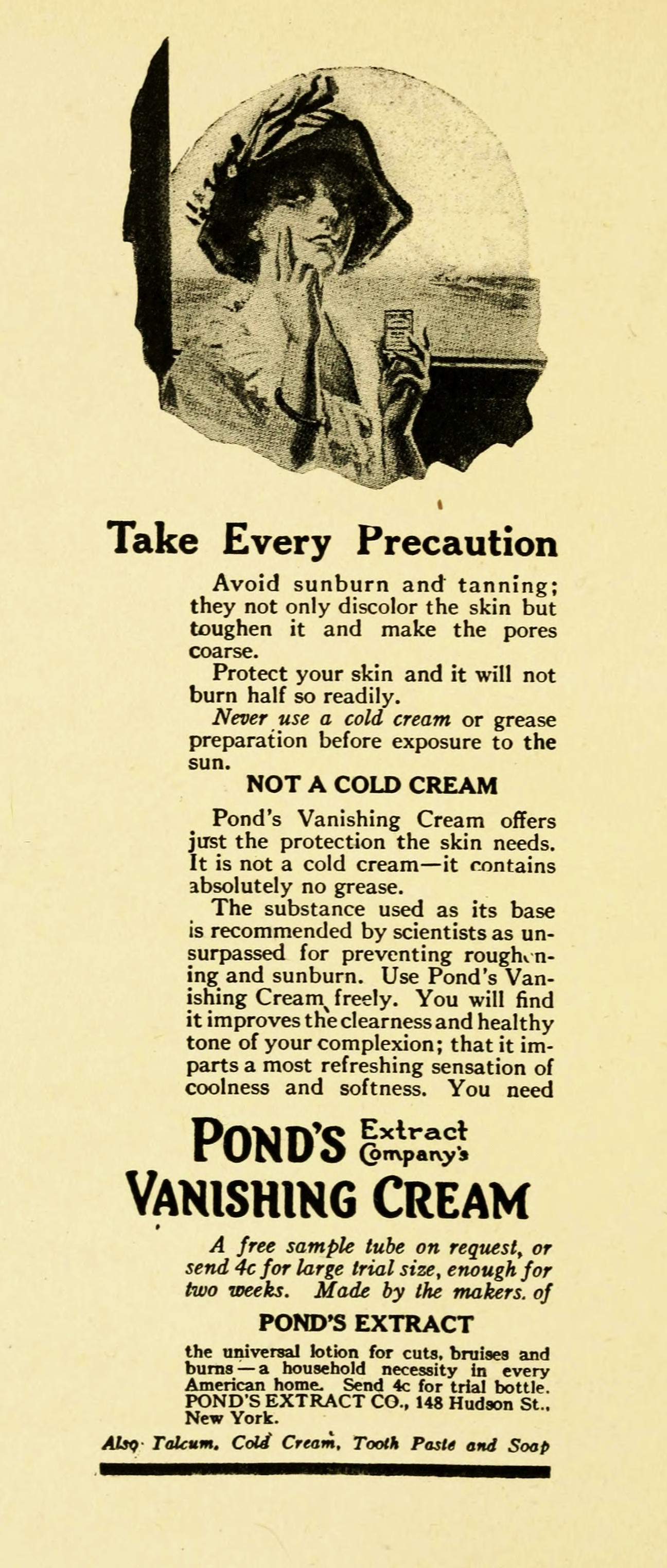
1917 advertisement

By 1910, Pond's was a well-established brand among Americans. Concentrating mostly on their vanishing cream, the Pond's company began an ad campaign that would become popular because of the celebrities involved in it. Pond's Healing took a back seat to Pond's Vanishing Cream, as Pond's Healing and Pond's Cold Cream would be announced in small print under the Pond's Vanishing Cream advertisements.

By 1914, mentions of Pond's Healing were taken off the ads, and the Pond's company began to advertise Pond's Vanishing Cream and Pond's Cold Cream together, making sure to explain each cream's different purposes on the new ads. One such ad line read, "Every normal skin needs these two creams."

As a result of the new campaign, Pond's Vanishing Cream had a 60% increase in sales during 1915, and Pond's Cold Cream had a 27% increase.

=== 1920s–1940s ===
By 1922, sales of the products had gone down, as many believed that such an easily available product could not perform as well as other, fancier products. The Pond's Company responded by seeking testimonials from royalty, politicians, and people of high-class stature and placing ads in chic magazines such as Vogue. In 1923, for example, Queen Marie of Romania visited the United States and enjoyed Pond's product so much that in 1925 she wrote to the company requesting more. Her letter was, in turn, used for advertisement, and Her Majesty joined the list of celebrities who had sponsored the products. Around the time of her U.S. visit, the Pond's Company began to place samples of their products with their magazine ads and to use the brand mascots of "Peter Ponds" and "Polly Ponds". The marketing strategies proved successful, as sales of the Pond's facial creams went up again.

"Peter" and "Polly Ponds" disappeared from the company's ad campaigns after 1925.

During the Depression Era of the 1930s, the company's business, like many others, slowed. The company added a face powder called Angel Face, first marketed in 1946.

=== Company mergers ===
Pond's Company was merged in 1955 with the Chesebrough Manufacturing Company, whose brand held a good percentage of the facial care field. With this merger, Pond's creams became sisters with Cutex nail polish and Matchabelli perfumes. With Chesebrough in command, Pond's creams became available at many supermarkets across the United States. The creams' bottles consisted of small, glass bottles with a round cap. The bottles were recognizable by their distinctive colors, usually in green, blue or white. The bottle design is still in use by the Pond's brand.

In 1987, the Chesebrough Manufacturing Company, popularly known as Chesebrough-Ponds, was acquired by the Anglo-Dutch company Unilever, giving Pond's creams a more international reach. In 2021, Unilever spun a number of non-core beauty brands including Pond's into a standalone business called Elida Beauty.
