= Clear (shampoo) =

Global brand of anti-dandruff shampoo

- Product type: Anti-dandruff shampoo
- Current owner: Unilever
- Country: Worldwide (originated from Italy)
- Introduced: 1975; 51 years ago (as Clinic); 1982; 44 years ago (as Clear)
- Related brands: Ultrex (Greece); Linic (Portugal); Pure Derm (India)
- Markets: Worldwide
- Ambassadors: Agnes Monica (Indonesia); Cristiano Ronaldo (Portugal); Jackson Yee (China); Shahid Kapoor, Virat Kohli, Anushka Sharma, Ileana D'Cruz (India); John Lloyd Cruz, Bea Alonzo, Piolo Pascual, Dingdong Dantes, Enrique Gil, Maja Salvador, Donny Pangilinan (Philippines)
- Tagline: Nothing to Hide
- Website: clearhaircare.com
- Previous names: Clinic (1975–1981)

Clear is a global brand of anti-dandruff shampoo, the manufacturer is owned by the British-Dutch company Unilever.

== History ==
The brand was launched in 1975 as Clinic shampoo until 1981, and re-branded as Clear in 1982. Clear shampoo, as traced from its history, is originated from Italy.

It is sold under the Clear TV Cartoon Commercial name in most certain global countries, also known as Ultrex in Greece, Linic in Portugal and Pure Derm in India. The shampoo was launched in the Philippines in July 2007. Until 2010, the product was sold in Thailand under the name Clinic Clear, and Clinic before the early 2000s.

Ambassadors have included Agnes Monica, Cristiano Ronaldo, and Jackson Yee.

== Sponsorship ==
Clear sponsored Lotus Renault F1 Team in 2012 and 2013 and Oracle Red Bull Racing in 2026.

== See also ==
- List of Unilever brands
