= Peroxynonanoic acid =

Identifiers
| CAS Number | 3058-35-3 |
| 3D model (JSmol) | Interactive image |
| ChemSpider | 8373415 |
| PubChem CID | 10197915 |
| CompTox Dashboard (EPA) | DTXSID80436626 |
- InChI: InChI=1S/C9H18O3/c1-2-3-4-5-6-7-8-9(10)12-11/h11H,2-8H2,1H3 Key: YPHMCUWNPAXYOX-UHFFFAOYSA-N
- SMILES: CCCCCCCCC(=O)OO

Properties
| Chemical formula | C_{9}H_{18}O_{3} |
| Molar mass | 174.24 g·mol^{−1} |
- Except where otherwise noted, data are given for materials in their standard state (at 25 °C [77 °F], 100 kPa). Infobox references

Peroxynonanoic acid (also peroxypelargonic acid) is a peroxycarboxylic acid. It is formed from precursor compounds contained in detergents and acts as a bleach.

== Properties ==
Peroxynonanoic acid crystallizes in the monoclinic crystal system in the space group P21/c with the lattice parameters a = 23.49 Å; b = 4.80 Å, c = 9.64 Å and β = 106.0° as well as four unit cells.

== Use ==
Peroxynonanoic acid acts as a bleaching agent in detergents but is not contained in the detergent itself; it is only formed during the washing process. Hydroperoxide ions, for example from sodium perborate, react with an activator to form peroxycarboxylic acid, which acts as the actual bleaching agent, achieving satisfactory results at lower temperatures than with sodium perborate alone. The main activators used are tetraacetylethylenediamine, which produces peroxyacetic acid (mainly in Europe), and sodium nonanoyloxybenzenesulfonate, which produces peroxynonanoic acid (mainly in America and Asia).
