= Sodium nonanoyloxybenzenesulfonate =

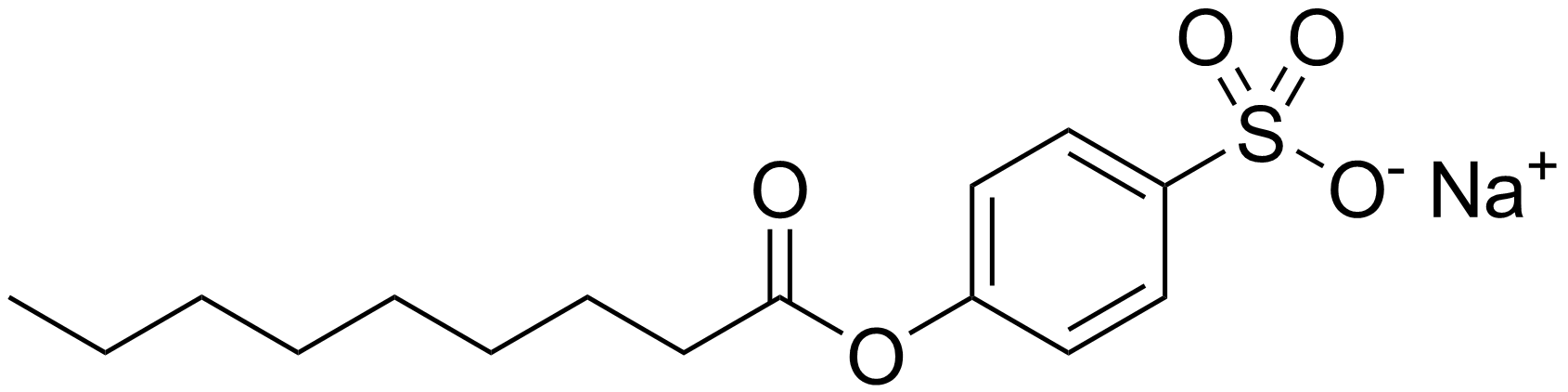

Names
- Preferred IUPAC name Sodium 4-(nonanoyloxy)benzene-1-sulfonate
- Other names 4-Sulfophenyl nonanoate sodium salt; Sodium p-nonanoyloxybenzenesulfonate; p-(Nonanoyloxy)benzenesulfonic acid sodium salt; p-Sodiosulfophenyl nonanoate

Identifiers
| CAS Number | 89740-11-4 |
| 3D model (JSmol) | Interactive image |
| Abbreviations | NOBS |
| ChemSpider | 152449 |
| PubChem CID | 174822 |
| UNII | 642JLH7JVI |
| CompTox Dashboard (EPA) | DTXSID4029064 |
- InChI: InChI=1S/C15H22O5S.Na/c1-2-3-4-5-6-7-12-15(16)20-13-10-8-9-11-14(13)21(17,18)19;/h8-11H,2-7,12H2,1H3,(H,17,18,19);/q;+1/p-1 Key: QSKQNALVHFTOQX-UHFFFAOYSA-M; InChI=1/C15H22O5S.Na/c1-2-3-4-5-6-7-12-15(16)20-13-10-8-9-11-14(13)21(17,18)19;/h8-11H,2-7,12H2,1H3,(H,17,18,19);/q;+1/p-1 Key: QSKQNALVHFTOQX-REWHXWOFAO
- SMILES: [Na+].O=C(Oc1ccccc1S([O-])(=O)=O)CCCCCCCC

Properties
| Chemical formula | C_{15}H_{21}NaO_{5}S |
| Molar mass | 336.38 g·mol^{−1} |
- Except where otherwise noted, data are given for materials in their standard state (at 25 °C [77 °F], 100 kPa). verify (what is ?) Infobox references

Sodium nonanoyloxybenzenesulfonate (NOBS) is an important component of laundry detergents and bleaches. It is known as a bleach activator for active oxygen sources, allowing formulas containing hydrogen peroxide releasing chemicals (specifically sodium perborate, sodium percarbonate, sodium persulfate, and urea peroxide) to effect bleaching at lower temperatures.

== Synthesis ==
NOBS is formed by the reaction of nonanoic acid (or its esters) with phenol followed by aromatic sulfonation using SO_{3} to form a sulfonic acid at the para-position.

== Bleach activation ==
NOBS was developed by Procter & Gamble in 1983 and was first used in American laundry detergents in 1988. NOBS is the main bleach activator used in the U.S.A. and Japan. Compared to TAED, which is the predominant bleach activator used in Europe, NOBS is efficient at much lower temperatures. At 20 °C NOBS is 100 times more soluble than TAED in water. When attacked by the perhydroxyl anion (from hydrogen peroxide), NOBS forms peroxynonanoic acid (a peroxy acid) and releases the leaving group sodium 4-hydroxybenzene sulfonate, which is an inert by-product.

== See also ==
- Tetraacetylethylenediamine (TAED) – another commonly-used bleach activator
