= Detergent (disambiguation) =

A detergent is a surfactant with cleaning properties in dilute solutions.

Detergent may also refer to:

- Biological detergent, a laundry detergent that contains enzymes
- Laundry detergent, a cleaning agent for laundry
- The Detergents, a 1960s musical group
