= Laundry wastewater =

Wastewater from the laundry process

Wastewater comes out of the laundry process with additional energy (heat), lint, soil, dyes, finishing agents, and other chemicals from detergents. Some laundry wastewater goes directly into the environment, due to the flaws of water infrastructure. The majority goes to sewage treatment plants before flowing into the environment. Some chemicals remain in the water after treatment, which may contaminate the water system. Some have argued they can be toxic to wildlife, or can lead to eutrophication.

== General influences of laundry wastewater ==
As of 2023, the United States has 2,538 industrial laundry facilities which may discharge an average of 400 m^{3} of wastewater every day. Annually, about 5.11 km^{3} laundry wastewater is produced.

=== Treatment of laundry wastewater ===
There are several parameters in the evaluation of laundry wastewater: temperature, pH-value, suspended substances, Cl_{2}, sediment substances, total nitrogen, total phosphorus, nitrogen ammonia, chemical oxygen demand(COD), biochemical oxygen demand(BOD_{5}), anionic surfactants.

=== Chemicals in detergents ===
Several common detergent ingredients are surfactants, builders, bleach-active compounds and auxiliary agents. The surfactants can be classified into anionic, cationic and nonionic surfactants. The most widely used surfactant linear alkylbenzene sulfonate (LAS) is an anionic surfactant. In builders, sodium triphosphate, zeolite A, sodium nitrilotriacetate (NTA) are the most important substances. Bleach-active compounds are usually sodium perborate and sodium percarbonate. Enzymes and fluorescent whitening agents are added into detergents as auxiliary agents.

== Mechanism ==
=== Environmental harm of surfactants ===
Surfactants are surface active agents, as they have both hydrophilic and lipophilic properties and are widely used in various washing process. With the lipophilic tails, surfactants are biologically active. Anionic surfactants have the ability of binding to bioactive macromolecules like enzymes, DNA, peptides, causing changes of surface charge and the folding of polyp eptide chain(structure o different. Cationic surfactant can bind to the inner membrane of bacteria, and by this way disorganize the bacteria through their long alkyl chain. Nonionic surfactants are able to bind to both proteins and phospholipid membrane, leading to leakage of low molecular mass compounds by increasing the permeability of membranes and vesicles. This may result in serious damage in cells or even cell death.

==== LAS and its biodegradation ====
Linear alkylbenzene sulfonate (LAS) with the formula of C_{12}H_{25}C_{6}H_{4}SO_{3}Na, also known as sodium dodecylbenzene sulfonate, is the most widely used anionic surfactant in laundry detergent because it has minimal environmental impact for its readily biodegradation.

A complete biodegradation under aerobic conditions consists of two steps, primary biodegradation and ultimate biodegradation. The first step begins from the terminal carbon in the alkyl chain as omega-oxidation, which can start from one or both ends, then is followed by beta-oxidation. After the first step the residual is sulfophenyl(di)carboxylates (SP(d)Cs), a large molecule which can be involved in the second step. The second step occurs only when the required bacteria exist. The ring cleavage of benzene and the further desulphonation of the mono- and dicarboxylic sulphophenyl acids happen. After the two-step biodegradation, LAS is degraded into carbon dioxide, water, inorganic salts and residual biomass. During the biodegradation, several specific bacteria and oxygen are required in both omega-oxidation of the alkyl chain and the benzene ring cleaving process, so this biodegradation can only happen in aerobic conditions. In anaerobic conditions in treatment process, LAS shows no change. Researchers also prove that biodegradation process is restricted in 20–40 mg/L and even inhibited at a higher concentration, which leads to the incomplete biodegradation of LAS in sewage treatment plants.

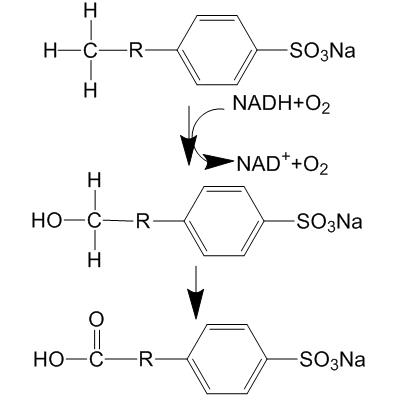
Omega-oxidation of LAS biodegradation

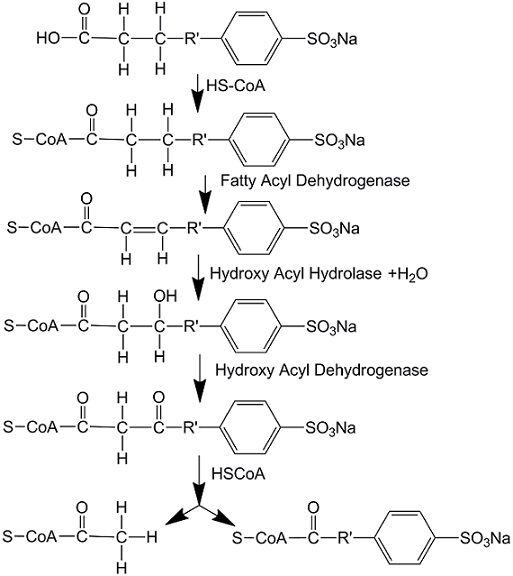
Beta-oxidation of LAS biodegradation

=== Harm of builders to the environment ===
Builders in detergents are water softeners, which can remove calcium and magnesium ions by complexation or precipitation in hard water which contains high levels of calcium and magnesium.

Sodium triphosphate, with a formula of Na_{5}P_{3}O_{10}, is a largely used builder in laundry detergents, which can lead to eutrophication caused by phosphorus (P). P is needed for energy transfer, the formation of DNA, RNA and many other intermediary metabolites. Only P in orthophosphate can be assimilated by autotrophs, other P compounds like sodium triphosphate can be chemically or enzymatically hydrolyzed to orthophosphate. The mechanism is shown below.

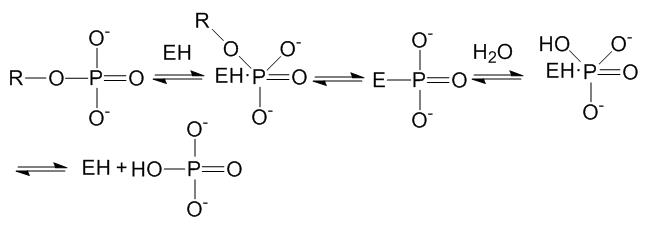
Degradation of sodium triphosphate with enzyme

Excessive phosphorus can make for excessive production of autotrophs, like algae and cyanobacteria, leading to eutrophication in an inorganic nutrient pathway. Nutrient enrichment in lakes and reservoirs results in the microscopic floating plants, algae and formation of dense mats of larger floating plants that can produce oxygen by photosynthesis. When they die and sink to the bottom, they consume oxygen in decomposition. Bacteria thriving in this process consume oxygen. With the depletion of oxygen, fishes die and anaerobic bacteria produce methane, hydrogen sulfide and ammonia, which can destroy the ecosystem.
