= Environmental impact of cleaning products =

Environmental impacts of cleaning products entail the consequences that come as a result of chemical compounds in cleaning products. These cleaning products can contain chemicals that have detrimental impacts on the environment or on people.

== Chemicals & their impact ==
=== Alkylphenol ethoxylates ===
Alkylphenol ethoxylates (APEs) are widely used in household products such as detergents and all-purpose cleaning products. They are found in 55% of the household cleaning market. They are susceptible to microbial or photochemical degradation into alkylphenols, some of which can be hormone-mimicking compounds.

=== Triclosan ===
Triclosan (TCS) is a common households anti-bacterial and anti-fungal agent found in soaps, detergents, and other disinfectants. Of household products that contain TCS, 96% of the volume is eventually discarded down the drain. Thus, TCS is mostly found in aquatic environments, and levels have been tested throughout the US to determine the amounts that are present in the environment. The most notable levels of TCS were found in wastewater (up to 26.2 μg concentration) and extremely high in biosolids found in sewage sludge (up to 35,000 μg concentration). After this wastewater is treated, significant levels of up to 2.7 μg concentration of TCS are still found in water. TCS poses an environmental threat due to its environmental accumulation and persistence, as it is impossible to be removed in its entirety. Overall, TCS is found in 57.6% of all rivers and streams tested throughout the US. In addition, TCS levels are transferred through the water into marine life. Other chemicals that come as a bi-product of TCS are known as degradation products. During wastewater treatment, Methyltriclosan (MTCS) is produced as a result of methylation of TCS, which is not biodegradable and incredibly persistent throughout the environment. In addition, the transformation of TCS during manufacturing leads to the production of dioxins into aquatic habitats. Dioxins have been proven to cause cancer as well as immense developmental issues in almost every vertebrate species. Most notably, TCS has been found in aquatic snails and algae, with levels tested of 500μg kg−1 and 1400μg kg−1. Similarly, MTCS has also been found to bioaccumulate in species, and in aquatic snails and algae, they were tested to have 1200μg kg−1. Thus, the presence of triclosan in the water can pose immense threats to aquatic life as it bioaccumulates.

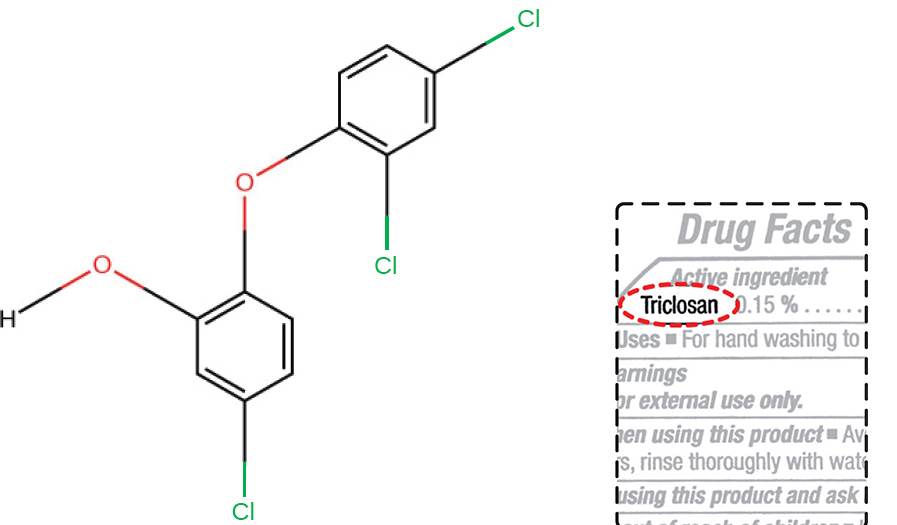
Triclosan chemical structure & common labeling.

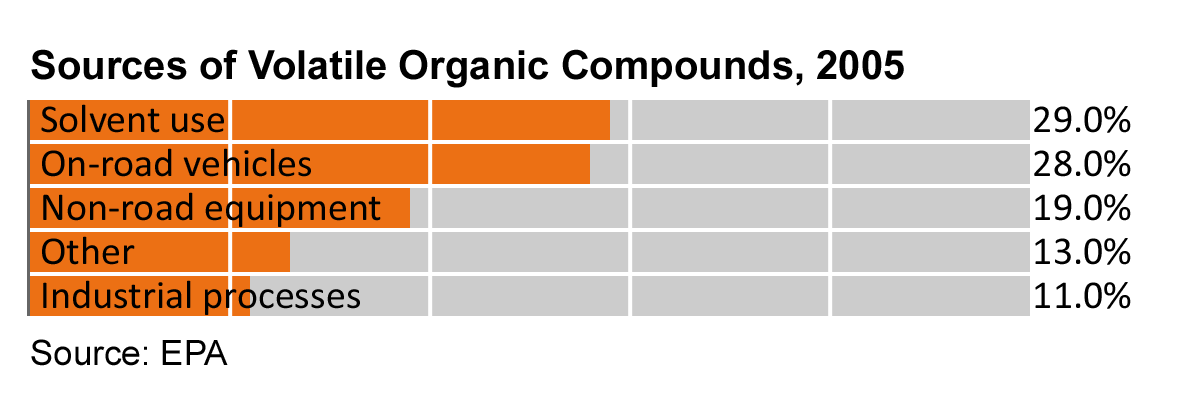
Sources of volatile organic compounds. "Solvent use" is the source that originates from cleaning chemicals.

=== Propellant Gas ===
Products that are packaged in aerosol cans contain a chemical known as propellant gas. Almost always, this propellant gas is called chlorofluorocarbons (CFCs). CFCs have been proven to damage the ozone layer and caused the ozone hole. Thus, in 1996, CFCs were banned directly as a result of the detrimental environmental impacts. This ban came as a result of The Montreal Protocol of 1989, which called for action to reduce and eliminate ozone-depleting substances. Following the ban of CFCs, aerosols are now filled with hydrocarbon or compressed gasses, which have been linked to cause VOCs, which are associated with smog and air pollution.

=== Phosphates ===
Phosphates are commonly used as a detergent in a wide array of cleaning products. The most prevalent form of phosphates that are found in household cleaners is pentasodium triphosphate (PTSP). PTSP and other phosphates are unable to be fully removed during wastewater treatment. It has been linked to eutrophication, which entails excessive growth of algae, which absorbs all of the oxygen in the water. Due to lack of oxygen, all aquatic life forms ranging from plants to marine animals will die. Eutrophication is a very serious environmental hazard that can rapidly destroy marine ecosystems, making it impossible for aquatic life to survive in the future.

=== Government regulation in the US ===
In terms of regulation, the Environmental Protection Agency (EPA) has headed the regulatory advancements in recent years. For example, in 1976, the Toxic Substances Control Act (TSCA) was passed. This act called for restrictions on some chemicals, mandatory ingredient reporting, and testing requirements. Some of the chemicals that were restricted included polychlorinated biphenyls (PCBs), asbestos, lead-based paint, and radon. Section 4 of this act called for testing of chemicals to determine any detrimental impacts that could come as a result. A sector of the EPA focused on "compliance monitoring," which ensures that companies are following the guidelines that have been put in place by the TSCA. PCBs have been found in de-dusting agents, so the TCSA has proven important in the mitigation of this chemical in household cleaning. However, the TSCA is primarily focused towards industrial application of chemicals.

In 1972, the Clean Water Act was passed, which regulates the wastewater standards and water quality expectations. This act led to the implementation of the EPA's National Pollutant Discharge Elimination System (NPDES), which requires permits in order to discharge pollutants into the water. This allows for a much stricter regulation regarding the quantities of pollutants that can be discarded.

== Environmentally benign chemical alternatives ==
Alternative cleaning chemicals can be utilized in households without compromising its ability to clean effectively. The EPA has provided criterion for avoiding environmentally detrimental chemicals in household cleaning. They suggest choosing products with a low VOC content, biodegradability, and those that utilize renewable resources

With the aim of decreasing net efficiency, some brands of laundry detergent have been reformulated for use with cold water. By allowing the consumer to use cold water rather than hot, each load cuts back significantly on energy costs. The EPA suggests using products that are designed for use in cold water to conserve energy.

=== 2-Butoxylethanol, ethylene glycol monobutyl ether (EGBE) ===
2-Butoxyethanol is a common glycol ether used as a solvent in carpet, hard-surface, glass, and oven cleaners owing to its surfactant properties. It is a relatively cheap, volatile solvent of low toxicity. It has the further advantage of not bioaccumulating.

== See also ==
- Best available technology
- Environmental effects of laundry wastewater
- Green cleaning
- Marine pollution - Human impacts
- Trisodium phosphate
- Teeth cleaning twig
- Sustainability
- bioaccumulation
