= Skip (detergent) =

Brand of laundry detergent

- Product type: Laundry detergent
- Current owner: Unilever
- Country: France
- Introduced: 1959; 67 years ago
- Markets: France; Spain; Portugal; Greece; Cyprus; Argentina; South Africa

Skip is a brand of laundry detergent manufactured and marketed by Unilever in France, Spain, Portugal, Greece, Cyprus, Argentina and South Africa. In the past it was also marketed in Germany, but it was discontinued in 2009. It is Unilever's top-of-the-line detergent brand in the countries where it is marketed, and features a splodge-like logo similar to British Persil.

== History ==
The brand was first introduced in 1959 in France, by the Lever Brothers company, as a low-suds washing powder specially designed for automatic washing machines. During the 1960s it was also introduced in other European countries such as Spain, Portugal and Greece. Since the 1970s it also contains enzymes in its formula, being a biological detergent. In 1978 it became the first detergent powder to contain TAED bleach activators (marketed as TETRAED B).

Today the range includes detergents in various forms such as powder, liquid, gel, tablets and pods. It also includes products for clothing that needs special care such as wool, silk, and black clothes. Its formula is similar to British Persil Bio or European Omo.
