= Oxyper =

Coated and stabilised sodium carbonate peroxyhydrate

Oxyper is a Solvay coated and stabilised sodium carbonate peroxyhydrate (or sodium percarbonate) which combines the properties of sodium carbonate and hydrogen peroxide. It is an odorless, crystalline, white powder used, when dissolved in water, in cleaning and bleaching applications and as a beer keg and line cleaner. It is a brand name of the Solvay S.A. Corporation, headquartered in Brussels.
