= Destruction of medical waste =

Medical waste can be treated and disposed of using a variety of methods depending on the waste type, infrastructure, and environmental regulations.

- High-temperature incineration
- Microwave Destruction
- MagnetGas System
- Sterilization
  - Electron beam (E-beam)
  - Steam sterilization (autoclaving)
  - Chemical disinfection

== High-temperature incineration ==
Incineration is a widely employed method for the disposal of hazardous medical waste. This process involves burning waste at approximately 900 °C, followed by a secondary combustion phase where the resulting gases are exposed to temperatures exceeding 1,200 °C for a duration of 0.5 to 2 seconds. Subsequently, these gases undergo filtration to reduce emissions. However, if not managed correctly, incineration has the potential to release harmful substances into the environment, including dioxins, furans, and heavy metals.

== Sterilization ==
Various methodologies exist for the sterilization of infectious waste, with steam sterilization, commonly referred to as autoclaving, being the predominant technique employed in developed nations. These sterilization methods are considered to be environmentally safer alternatives when compared to traditional incineration practices.

=== Steam sterilization (Autoclaving) ===
This methodology employs high-pressure saturated steam as a means to eliminate pathogens effectively. Following the sterilization process, the waste undergoes shredding, which leads to a considerable reduction in volume. This approach is regarded as cost-effective and demonstrates markedly lower emissions in comparison to traditional incineration methods.

=== Electron beam (E-beam) ===
The methodology in question employs accelerated high-energy electrons to induce disruptions in microbial DNA structures. This process demonstrates considerable efficacy in the inactivation of pathogenic organisms; however, it necessitates the utilization of costly and specialized apparatuses, which restricts its broader applicability within various settings.

=== Chemical disinfection ===
The described method entails the application of disinfectants, including chlorine, formaldehyde, and peracetic acid, to effectively neutralize pathogenic microorganisms. This technique is predominantly utilized for the treatment of liquid waste, yet it poses significant risks to occupational safety and environmental health if not managed with due diligence. Proper protocols and safety measures must be adhered to in order to mitigate potential hazards associated with the use of these chemical agents.See also

- Medical waste
- Autoclave
- Waste management
- Hazardous waste
