= Björn Borg (disambiguation) =

Björn Borg (born 1956) is a Swedish tennis player.

Björn Borg may also refer to:

- Björn Borg (swimmer) (1919–2009), Swedish swimmer
- Björn Borg (brand), underwear brand named after the tennis player
