= Bleach activator =

Class of chemical compounds

tetraacetylethylenediamine (TAED)

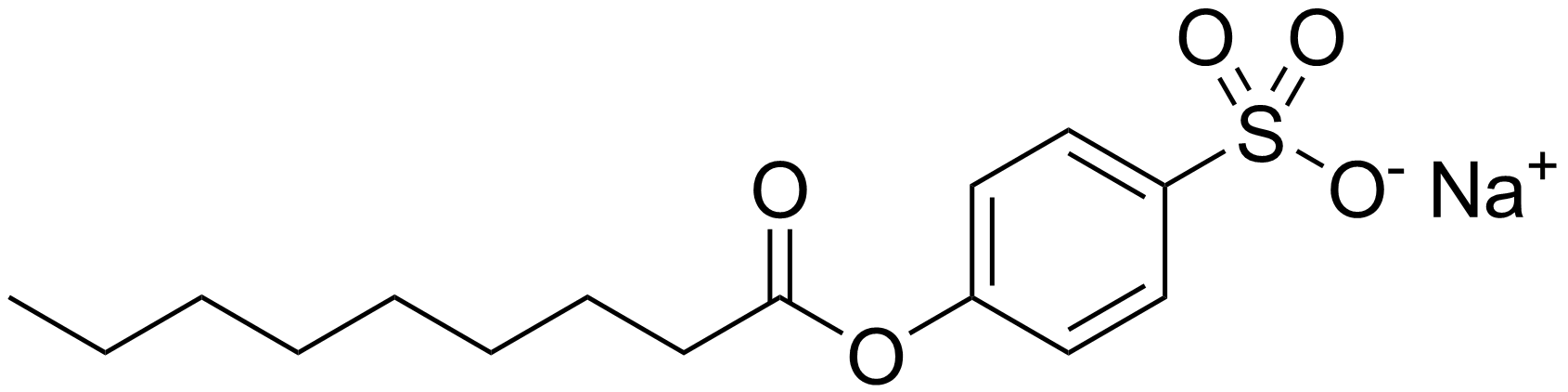
sodium nonanoyloxybenzenesulfonate (NOBS)

Bleach activators are compounds that enable bleach to work effectively at a lower wash temperature than would otherwise be required. Bleaching agents, typically peroxides, are usually sufficiently active only at or above 60 °C. Bleach activators lower the threshold by reacting with hydrogen peroxide in aqueous solution to form peroxy acids. Peroxy acids are more effective bleaching agents than hydrogen peroxide below 60 °C, but are too unstable to be stored in their active form and therefore must be generated in situ.

The most common bleach activators used commercially are tetraacetylethylenediamine (TAED) and sodium nonanoyloxybenzenesulfonate (NOBS). NOBS is the main activator used in the United States and Japan; TAED is the main activator used in Europe.

== Structure and properties ==
Bleach activators are typically made up of two parts: the peroxy acid precursor and the leaving group; and are modified by altering these parts. The peroxy acid precursor affects the bleaching properties of the peroxy acid: determining the activity, selectivity, hydrophobic/hydrophilic balance and oxidation potential. The leaving group influences the solubility, perhydrolysis rate and storage stability of the activator.

== Mechanism of activation ==
Bleach activation is also known as perhydrolysis. Persalts are inorganic salts that are used as hydrogen peroxide carriers (examples include sodium percarbonate and sodium perborate). Persalts and bleach activators are included together in powder laundry detergents that contain bleach. In the wash, both compounds dissolve in the water. When dissolved in water, the persalt releases hydrogen peroxide (e.g. from sodium percarbonate):

2Na_{2}CO_{3}∙3H_{2}O_{2} → 2Na_{2}CO_{3} + 3H_{2}O_{2}

In a basic wash solution, hydrogen peroxide loses a proton and is converted to the perhydroxyl anion:

H_{2}O_{2} ⇌ H^{+} + HO_{2}^{−}

The perhydroxyl anion then attacks the activator, forming a peroxy acid:

HO_{2}^{−} + RC(O)X → X^{−} + RC(O)O_{2}H

The overall reaction of TAED (1) with 2 equivalents of hydrogen peroxide gives diacetylethylenediamine (2) and 2 equivalents of peracetic acid (3):

Only the perhydroxyl anion, and not the hydrogen peroxide molecule, reacts with the bleach activator. In aqueous solutions, the hydroxide ion is also present, but owing to the greater nucleophilicity of the perhydroxyl anion, it will react preferentially. Once formed, the peroxy acid can act as a bleach.

== Economics ==
The consumption of bleach activators in 2002 was approximately 105,000 tonnes. Consumption, however, is stagnant or declining due to cost pressures on detergents and the advance of liquid detergent formulations (which contain no bleach and bleach activators). The relatively high cost of conventional bleaching systems restrict their spread in emerging markets, where cold water is used for washing and photobleaching by sunlight is widespread, or the use of sodium hypochlorite solution is common (as in the US).

There remains considerable potential in Europe for more active bleach activators due to the significant potential energy savings achievable by washing at lower temperatures, but their higher activity must not be accompanied by greater damage to textile dyes and fibers. In addition to stain bleaching in laundry, the disinfecting and deodorizing effects of bleach/activator combinations also play an important role. Therefore, they are also used in dishwashing detergents and denture cleaners.

== Examples ==
Typical bleach activators are essentially N- and O-acyl compounds that form peroxyacids upon perhydrolysis (meaning hydrolysis by hydrogen peroxide from the bleach, persalts). For example, TAED produces in the wash liquor bleach-active peroxyacetic acid or from DOBA peroxydodecanoic acid. In all cases, the activator is chemically reacted according to the degree of contamination in the laundry and thus "consumed".

The literature describes a variety of active N-acyl compounds, such as tetraacetyl glycoluril and other acylated saturated nitrogen-containing heterocycles, such as hydantoins, hydrotriazines, diketopiperazines, etc., as well as acylated imides and lactams. A disadvantage of these compounds compared to the standard compound TAED is their usually poorer economic and ecological performance.

In addition to the acylated phenol derivatives NOBS, LOBS and DOBA (negatively charged in the aqueous medium), further bleach-active O-acyl compounds are described, for example tetraacetylxylose or pentaacetylglucose. DOBA, commonly used in Japan, is characterized by good biodegradability and greater effect on a number of microorganisms compared to TAED. Both work together synergistically. Furthermore, nitriles, such as cyanopyridine and cyanamides, cyanomorpholine and in particular cyanomethyl trialkyl/arylammonium salts are known bleach activators (the latter, the so-called nitrile quats, are present in aqueous solution as cations).

$$\left[\ce{R^2 - \overset{\displaystyle R^1 \atop |}\underset{| \atop \displaystyle R^3}{N+}-CH2-CN} \right]\ce{X-}$$

Nitrile quats are active in bleaching even at temperatures around 20 °C and act via peroxoimino acids that are formed intermediately from peroxo compounds. These decompose to the corresponding quaternary amides, which react with the help of hydrogen peroxide to the corresponding, readily biodegradable betaines. A disadvantage of nitrile quats is the poor biodegradability of the original substances and their often pronounced hygroscopicity, which, however, can be reduced by suitable counterions.

Other new bleaching systems have been developed, especially for washing at lower temperatures and room temperature and for use in liquid detergent formulations:

- New and more active peroxyacids, such as phthalimidoperoxyhexanoic acid (PAP)

PAP Structure

- Peracid boosters that form highly reactive intermediates with peracids (such as cyclic sulfonimines as precursors of reactive oxaziridines) or sugar-based ketones that form bleach-active dioxiranes with hydrogen peroxide
- Bleach catalysts, which form as stable transition metal complexes (of metals such as manganese, iron, cobalt, etc.) with persalts bleaching-active oxygen species even at temperatures below 30 °C. They exceeds the activity of the standard compound TAED by almost 100 times. Such complexes offer enormous economic (lower detergent volume, less packaging, lower transport costs) and environmental benefits (low washing temperature, low wastewater pollution). Particularly interesting are bleaching catalysts of the second generation, which already form bleaching-active species with atmospheric oxygen, i.e. they can mimic the active sites of natural mono- or dioxygenases. However, in 1994, the launch of a first generation manganese complex by Unilever in the UK was a commercial failure. As a result, consumers' confidence in bleach catalysts has been shaken on a sustained basis. The only use of bleach catalyst/persalt combinations to date (2017) are used in dishwashing detergents.
