= Peracetic acid =

Peracetic acid or percidine
Peroxyacetic acid
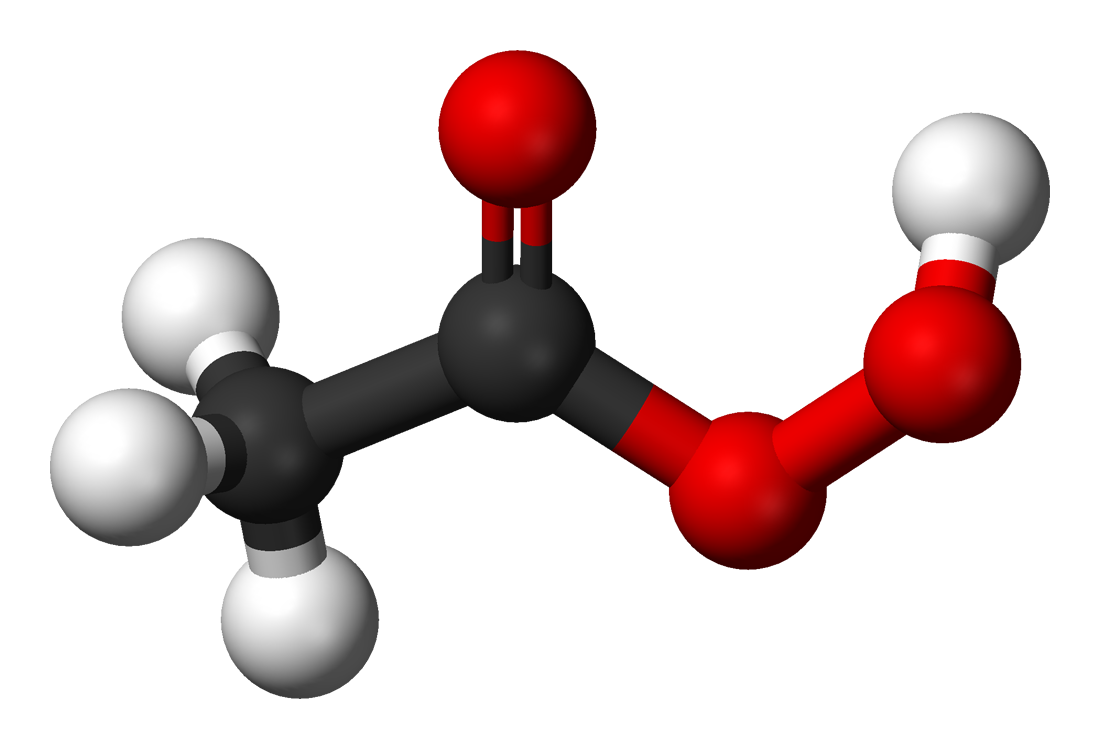
Peroxyacetic acid

Names
- Preferred IUPAC name Ethaneperoxoic acid
- Other names Peroxyacetic acid Acetic peroxide Acetyl hydroperoxide Proxitane; Percidine

Identifiers
CAS Number	79-21-0
3D model (JSmol)	Interactive image
Abbreviations	PAA
ChEBI	CHEBI:42530
ChEMBL	ChEMBL444965
ChemSpider	6336
ECHA InfoCard	100.001.079
EC Number	201-186-8
KEGG	D03467
PubChem CID	6585
RTECS number	SD8750000
UNII	I6KPI2E1HD
UN number	3107 3105
CompTox Dashboard (EPA)	DTXSID1025853
- InChI: InChI=1S/C2H4O3/c1-2(3)5-4/h4H,1H3 Key: KFSLWBXXFJQRDL-UHFFFAOYSA-N; InChI=1/C2H4O3/c1-2(3)5-4/h4H,1H3 Key: KFSLWBXXFJQRDL-UHFFFAOYAD
- SMILES: CC(=O)OO

Properties
Chemical formula	CH_{3}CO_{3}H
Molar mass	76.05 g/mol
Appearance	Colorless liquid
Density	1.0375 g/mL
Melting point	0 °C (32 °F; 273 K)
Boiling point	105 °C (221 °F; 378 K) (25 °C at 1.6 kPa)
Acidity (pK_{a})	8.2
Refractive index (n_{D})	1.3974 (589 nm, 20 °C)
Viscosity	3.280 cP

Pharmacology
ATCvet code	QG51AD03 (WHO)

Hazards
- GHS labelling
Pictograms	(GHS02: Flammable) (GHS05: Corrosive) (GHS07: Exclamation mark) (GHS09: Environmental hazard)
Signal word	Danger
Hazard statements	H226, H242, H302, H312, H314, H332, H400
Precautionary statements	P210, P220, P233, P234, P240, P241, P242, P243, P260, P264, P270, P271, P273, P280, P301+P312, P301+P330+P331, P302+P352, P303+P361+P353, P304+P312, P304+P340, P305+P351+P338, P310, P312, P321, P322, P330, P363, P370+P378, P391, P403+P235, P405, P411, P420, P501
NFPA 704 (fire diamond)	3 2 2 OX
Flash point	40.5 °C (104.9 °F; 313.6 K)
- Except where otherwise noted, data are given for materials in their standard state (at 25 °C [77 °F], 100 kPa). verify (what is ?) Infobox references

Peracetic acid (also known as peroxyacetic acid, or Percidine) is an organic compound with the formula CH_{3}CO_{3}H. This peroxy acid is a colorless liquid with a characteristic acrid odor reminiscent of acetic acid. It can be highly corrosive.

Peracetic acid is a weaker acid than the parent acetic acid, with a pK_{a} of 8.2.

== Production ==
Peracetic acid is produced industrially by the autoxidation of acetaldehyde:

O_{2} + CH_{3}CHO → CH_{3}CO_{3}H

Peracetic acid is conventionally prepared by combining acetic acid and hydrogen peroxide with homogeneous acid catalysts (e.g., sulfuric acid), which facilitate the reaction and achieve equilibrium between the reagents and product:

H_{2}O_{2} + CH_{3}CO_{2}H ⇌ CH_{3}CO_{3}H + H_{2}O

While it is feasible to create peracetic acid by combining consumer-grade vinegar (5% acetic acid) and hydrogen peroxide (3%) without an acid catalyst, the low concentration of reagents will result in a slow reaction rate at room temperature. Extrapolating from published reaction rates, the time to equilibrium is estimated to be on the order of weeks.

As an alternative, acetyl chloride and acetic anhydride can be used to generate a solution of the acid with lower water content.

Peracetic acid is also generated in situ by some laundry detergents. This is achieved by the action of bleach activators, such as tetraacetylethylenediamine and sodium nonanoyloxybenzenesulfonate, upon hydrogen peroxide formed from sodium percarbonate in water. The peracetic acid is a more effective bleaching agent than hydrogen peroxide itself. PAA is also formed naturally in the environment through a series of photochemical reactions involving formaldehyde and photo-oxidant radicals.

Peracetic acid is always sold in solution as a mixture with acetic acid and hydrogen peroxide to maintain its stability. The concentration of the acid as the active ingredient can vary.

== Uses ==
The United States Environmental Protection Agency first registered peracetic acid as an antimicrobial in 1986 for indoor use on hard surfaces. Use sites include agricultural premises, food establishments, medical facilities, and home bathrooms. Peracetic acid is also registered for use in dairy and cheese processing plants, on food processing equipment, and in pasteurizers in breweries, wineries, and beverage plants. It is also applied for the disinfection of medical supplies, to prevent biofilm formation in pulp industries, and as a water purifier and disinfectant. Peracetic acid can be used as a cooling tower water disinfectant, where it prevents biofilm formation and effectively controls Legionella bacteria. Nu-Cidex is the trade name for a brand of antimicrobial peracetic acid.

In the European Union, peroxyacetic acid was reported by the EFSA after submission in 2013 by the US Department of Agriculture.

Decontamination kits for cleaning fentanyl analogues from surfaces (as used by many police forces, amongst others) often contain solid peracetyl borate, which mixes with water to produce peracetic acid.

=== Epoxidation ===
Although less active than more acidic peracids (e.g., m-CPBA), peracetic acid in various forms is used for the epoxidation of various alkenes (Prilezhaev reaction). Useful applications are for unsaturated fats, synthetic and natural rubbers, and some natural products such as pinene. A variety of factors affect the amount of free acid or sulfuric acid (used to prepare the peracid).

== Safety ==
Peracetic acid is a strong oxidizing agent and severe irritant to the eyes, skin, and respiratory system. The U.S. Environmental Protection Agency published the following Acute Exposure Guideline Levels (AEGL):

eight-hour TWA AEGL	Definition	mg/m^{3}	ppm
1	The concentration at which the general population will experience transient and reversible problems, such as notable discomfort, irritation, or certain asymptomatic non-sensory effects.	0.52	0.17
2	The concentration that results in irreversible or other serious, long-lasting adverse health effects or an impaired ability to escape.	1.6	0.52
3	The concentration that results in life-threatening health effects or death.	4.1	1.3

== See also ==
- Diacetyl peroxide
- Disinfectant
- Hydroxyl
- Organic peroxide
- Peroxy acid
- Trifluoroperacetic acid
