= Björn Borg (brand) =

Swedish fashion company

- Type: Public
- Traded as: Nasdaq Nordic: BORG
- ISIN: SE0015811807
- Industry: Apparel, retail
- Founded: 1989; 37 years ago
- Founders: Björn Borg; Anders Arnborger; Louise Hildebeck
- Headquarters: Solna, Sweden
- Area served: Worldwide
- Key people: Henrik Bunge (CEO); Jens Nyström (CFO)
- Products: Apparel, undergarments, etc.
- Services: Retailing
- Revenue: SEK 705.2 million (2020)
- Operating income: SEK 33.7 million (2020)
- Website: bjornborg.com

Björn Borg AB is a Swedish apparel fashion brand named after the former professional tennis player of the same name.

== History ==
The company was formerly named World Brand Management (WBM), and has stores in seven European countries, with Sweden and the Netherlands being the most important ones. New markets are Germany and the United Kingdom.

WBM has since 1997 an exclusive trademarks license for the name Björn Borg, which gives them the rights to produce, market and sell Björn Borg products in all countries. It bought full rights to the trademark at the end of 2006 for $18 million. It was after this deal, WBM changed its name to Björn Borg in 2017. The main products are in the category of underclothes, shoes, purses, glasses and perfume.

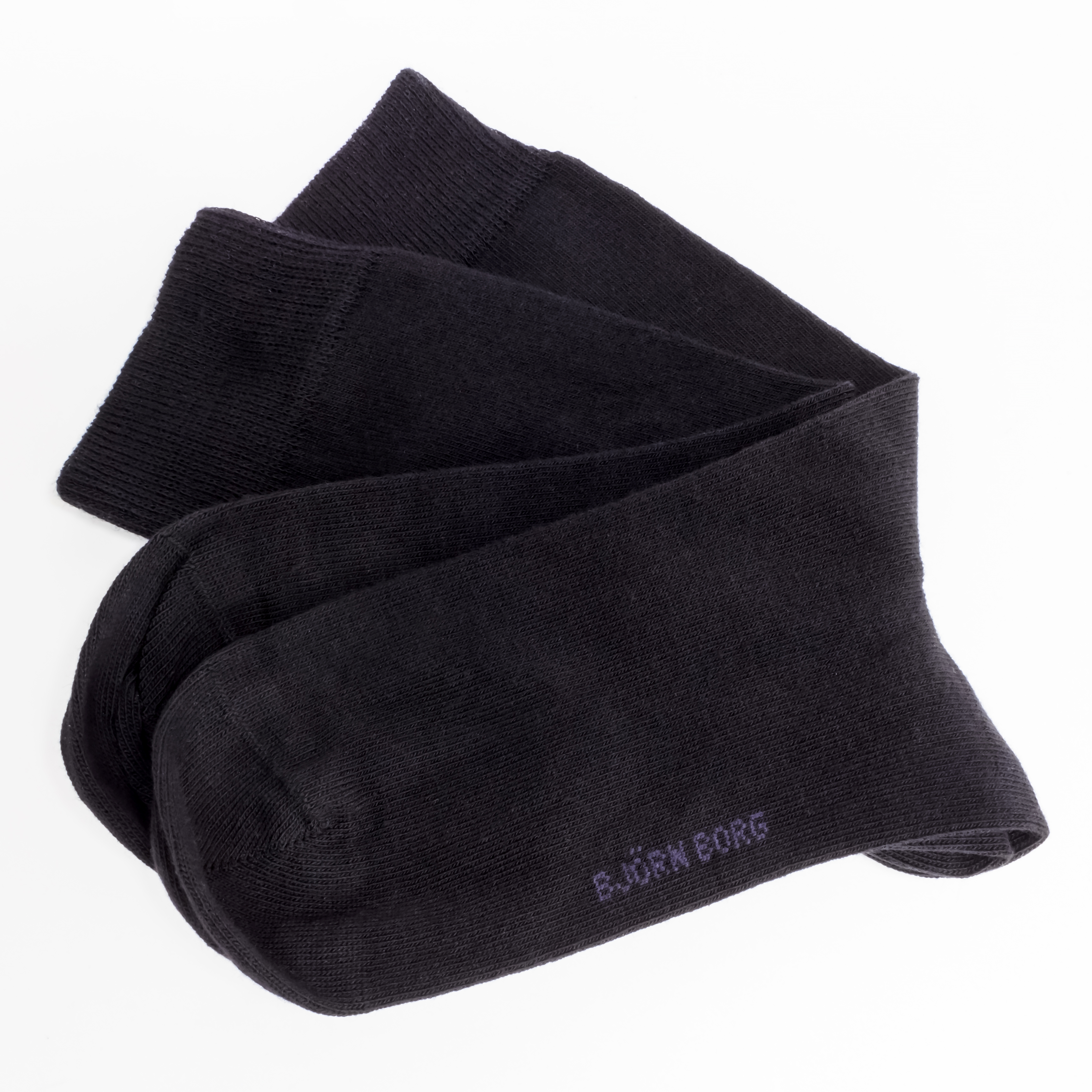
A pair of black Björn Borg cotton socks.

The biggest Björn Borg product is underclothes.

In 2015, the company released an advergame in collaboration with Isbit Games called First Person Lover. It is a first-person shooter in which the player can customize themselves in Björn Borg branded clothing and fight using "love weapons".

== Environmental record ==
On 13 August 2008, the Swedish newspaper Göteborgs-Posten reported finding high levels of the environmental estrogen nonylphenol ethoxylate (NPE) in Björn Borg underwear. Two pairs of black Björn Borg underwear, purchased from two different stores, were found to have concentrations of 860 mg NPE/kg and 490 mg of NPE/kg, respectively. At the time, NPE had already been forbidden for use within the European Union because of environmental concerns, but imports of products that used NPE during manufacture were allowed. The Swedish Textile Importers Association had recommended against the use of nonylphenol ethoxylates, and had recently proposed a limit of 250 mg of NPE/kg of textiles, whereas the Swedish Society for Nature Conservation and the Svenskt Vatten (sv) (Sweden's municipal water service company) recommend a limit of 20-50 mg NPE/kg. Annacarin Modin, Product Manager at Björn Borg AB, was quoted as indicating that the company complied with the regulations of the Textile Importers, and that their own analysis of randomly-selected batches of underwear showed an NPE content of 120-200 mg NPE/kg.

Currently (June 2017), Björn Borg AG is committing to eliminating substances of very high concern under the EU's REACH legislation (chemicals that could potentially be harmful, but are not yet proven to be so) from its supply chain, with particular focus on phthalates, fluorocarbons, and alkylphenol ethoxylates including nonylphenol ethoxylate. In 2020, Björn Borg moved its headquarters to Frösundavik in Solna municipality.
