= Peracetyl borate =

Chemical compound

Peracetyl borate is a chemical combining peracetic acid crystallised with acetic acid and sodium tetrahydroxyborate. (Na_{2}B_{4}O_{5}(OH)_{4}.•CH_{3}COOH•2CH_{3}COO_{2}H.

When it reacts with water, peracetic acid is released.

Peracetyl borate is used to decontaminate biological and chemical warfare agents, and opioid contamination. It works by forming N-oxides that do not have the same physiological effect. It is found in a commercial product called Dahlgren Decon.
