= Acute Exposure Guideline Levels =

Acute Exposure Guideline Levels (AEGLs) set levels of chemical concentration that pose a defined level of risk to humans (the general population, including susceptible individuals). These levels are used in preventing and responding to disasters. These guidelines are ascertained for one, short exposure (with a maximum of eight hours) by the air. The AEGL values are determined for varying times of exposure, such as ten minutes, thirty minutes, one hour, four hours and eight hours.

The AEGL values describe the expected effects of inhalation exposure to certain compounds (airborne concentrations in ppm or mg/m^{3}). Each AEGL is determined by different levels of a compound's toxicological effects, based on the 4 Ds: detection, discomfort, disability and death. There are three levels of AEGL-values: AEGL-1, AEGL-2 and AEGL-3. AEGL-1 is the airborne concentration above which notable discomfort or irritation could be experienced. However, the effects are not disabling and reversible once exposure stops. AEGL-2 is the airborne concentration above which irreversible or other serious, long-lasting adverse health effects or an impaired ability to escape could be experienced. AEGL-3 is the airborne concentration above which life-threatening health effects or death could be experienced. An example is shown below for chlorine gas AEGLs:

AEGLs for chlorine (in ppm)
| | Description | 10 min | 30 min | 60 min | 4 hours | 8 hours |
|---|---|---|---|---|---|---|
| AEGL-1 | discomfort, irritation no life threatening effects | 0.50 | 0.50 | 0.50 | 0.50 | 0.50 |
| AEGL-2 | long lasting health issue | 2.8 | 2.8 | 2.0 | 1.0 | 0.71 |
| AEGL-3 | life threatening effects or death | 50 | 28 | 20 | 10 | 7.1 |

In this example, several trends can be observed. First, as one moves from AEGL-1 to AEGL-3, the concentrations increase, based on the dose predicted to produce the respective effects (discomfort/irritation vs disability vs death). Second, as one moves from shorter exposures to longer (left to right in the same row), the overall concentration allowed decreases due to the effects of cumulative dose. This is not always the case for all values, however, not all toxicological effects are dose-dependent and sometimes only depend on air concentration.

== Why are AEGLS important ==
Acute Exposure Guidelines Levels (AEGLs) are important instruments for safeguarding public health during infrequent, unintentional release of dangerous airborne compounds. They establish quantitative criteria for when anyone, including elderly, children, and those with health issues, may begin to experience negative health impacts from short-term exposure.

=== Primary factors for their relevance ===
1. Emergency Preparedness and Response
2. Health Protection for All populations
3. Clear, actionable guidance
4. Consistent and transparent development
5. Risk Assessment and planning
6. Public Awareness and Communication

Emergency planners, responders and regulators all throughout the world use AEGLs to direct their operations during chemical spills, industrial disasters, and transportation accidents. They help to designate evacuation zones, shelter-in-place orders and safety precautions. They are meant to protect the general public, with particular emphasis on vulnerable subpopulations such as infants, the elderly and those suffering from asthma or other conditions. This ensures the vulnerable people are not overlooked during disaster preparedness. AEGLs are detected in ppm or mg/$m^2$, enabling real-time decision-making. They are classified into three severity levels (AEGL-1, AEGL-2, and AGEL-3) and five exposure lengths ( 10 minutes, 30 minutes, one hour, four hours and eight hours) allowing for tailored responses. To promote scientific rigor and public transparency, the United States Environmental Protection Agency and the national academics use formal, peer-reviewed procedures for producing AEGLs. This consistency builds trust between responders and the public. They play an important role in risk assessments for fixed facilities and transportation carriers, assisting in the development of disaster preparedness plans, preventative methods, and real time response. AEGLs provide a consistent language for communicating chemical risks during crises, assisting the public in determining when and what protective measure should be implemented.

== History/Development ==
Over 2,000 people died as a result of the 1984 methyl isocyanate leak in Bhopal, India, while numerous others had permanent lung and eye damage. One methyl isocyanate canister was the source of the leak. The necessity for governments to detect dangerous compounds and assist local communities in dealing with them was brought to the attention of the world by this and previous unintentional or deliberate chemical releases of airborne compounds, the AEGL program was created to offer advice for disaster preparedness programs and emergency responder.

The National Advisory Committee for Acute Exposure Guideline Levels for Hazardous Substances was formed in November 1995 to identify, Evaluate and interpret toxicology and other scientific data as well as to develop acute exposure guideline (AEGLs) for high-priority, acutely toxic chemicals. The committee is made up for government and non-government scientists from both and internationals arena. The committee's 15-year effort resulted in AEGLs that are utilized globally for emergency response operations by the commercial sector and all levels of government. This was a significant achievement because it prevented private sector and separate federal and stage agencies from adopting their own acute exposure guideline levels, which may have led to the publishing and use of disparate values and possibly caused confusion and controversy.

The National Academy of Sciences, which is now known as the National Academies, released "Guidelines for Development Community Emergency Exposure levels for Hazardous substances in June 1993.

The US EPA is one of the agencies that sets the AEGLs

Using this process, EPA created the idea of a working committee and asked state and federal agencies as well as business sector groups to support and participate in the creation of a joint committee to set exposure guideline levels. Usually known as the AEGL committee, the national advisory council for the development of acute exposure guidelines levels for hazardous substances was a federal advisory council. At its inaugural meeting in June 1996, it established AEGL values for at least 273 of the 329 substances on the AEGL priority chemical list and discussed over 300 chemicals. The AEGL committee's charter expired in October 2011 and its most recent meeting took place in April 2010. The AGEL program at EPA continues to function and collaborates with the National Academies to publish final AEGLs, despite the AEGL committee's work coming to an end. Throughout its existence, the AEGL committee established the benchmark for a novel and successful approach to creating a single, superior scientific product that is needed by several federal, state, and private sector organizations.

== Provisional Advisory Levels ==
Provisional Advisory Levels (PALs) for biotoxins in drinking water and air, chemical warfare agents, and priority hazardous industrial chemicals. 108 in order to support emergency response and decision-making, the PALs program aims to offer exposure values for these agents. These values will also be used as criteria to determine reuse and temporary re-entry into affected regions. Natural disaster, subversive actions, and transport are just a few of the circumstances that could call for the employment of PALs .The EPA advises using AEGLs for inhalation exposures to pollutants lasting less than 24 hours because the shortest exposure duration for PAL is 24 hours. PALs are a tiered risk system that forecast the chance of injury as exposure time and dose increase. By expanding the AEGL architecture to incorporate longer inhalation exposure periods and the oral exposure route, PALs offer more context for risk evaluation. Based on the severity of anticipated health effects, risk levels (PAL 1, PAL 2, and PAL 3) are determined for each of the 24-hour, 30-day and 90-day PALs.

- PAL 1: Represents the assumed continuous exposure concentration of a chemical in water or air over which the general population may have minor physiological reactions or changes from baseline of particular biomarkers. It is not anticipated that concentrations at or below the PAL 1 values will have a negative impact on health. The overall population, including all ages and sensitive subpopulations, may have increasingly detrimental consequences as concentrations above the PAL 1 value rise.

== See also ==
- Immediately dangerous to life or health
- Lethal dose
