= Phthalimidoperoxycaproic acid =

Names
- Preferred IUPAC name 6-(1,3-Dioxo-1,3-dihydro-2H-isoindol-2-yl)hexaneperoxoic acid

Identifiers
| CAS Number | 128275-31-0 |
| 3D model (JSmol) | Interactive image |
| ChemSpider | 8036120 |
| ECHA InfoCard | 100.101.039 |
| EC Number | 410-850-8 |
| PubChem CID | 9860421 |
| UNII | 5OEJ6FAL6C |
| CompTox Dashboard (EPA) | DTXSID60155848 |
- InChI: Key: UZJGVXSQDRSSHU-UHFFFAOYSA-N; InChI=1S/C14H15NO5/c16-12(20-19)8-2-1-5-9-15-13(17)10-6-3-4-7-11(10)14(15)18/h3-4,6-7,19H,1-2,5,8-9H2
- SMILES: C1=CC=C2C(=C1)C(=O)N(C2=O)CCCCCC(=O)OO

Properties
| Chemical formula | C_{14}H_{15}NO_{5} |
| Molar mass | 277.276 g·mol^{−1} |

Hazards
- GHS labelling
| Pictograms | (GHS02: Flammable) (GHS05: Corrosive) (GHS09: Environmental hazard) |
| Signal word | Danger |
| Hazard statements | H242, H318, H400 |
| Precautionary statements | P210, P220, P234, P273, P280, P305+P351+P338, P310, P370+P378, P391, P403+P235, P411, P420, P501 |
- Except where otherwise noted, data are given for materials in their standard state (at 25 °C [77 °F], 100 kPa). Infobox references

Phthalimidoperoxycaproic acid (ε- or 6-(phthalimido)peroxyhexanoic acid, abbreviated as PAP) is a synthetic organic peroxy acid derived from caprolactam and phthalic anhydride. The compound is mainly used as a preformed bleaching agent, alternatively to or together with hydrogen peroxide, in moderate laundry conditions of pH and temperature. It is also used as a tooth whitening agent. PAP is a white odorless crystalline powder at room temperature. It is slightly soluble in water and a strong oxidizer.
