= Phosphates in detergent =

Phosphates in detergent refers to the use of phosphates as an ingredient in a detergent product. The advantage of using phosphates in a consumer laundry detergent or dishwashing detergent is that they make detergents more efficient by chelating calcium and magnesium ions. The disadvantage of using phosphates is that they remain in wastewater and eventually make their way to a natural body of water. While phosphates are low toxicity, they instead cause nutrient pollution and feed the algae. This leads to eutrophication and harmful algal bloom.

Many countries have banned the use of phosphates in detergent, including the United States and countries of the European Union.

== Regulation ==
In 1977 the United States Environmental Protection Agency published a position paper advocating for a phosphate ban in detergents.

States including Maine, Florida and Indiana in the United States began restricting or banning phosphates in laundry detergent in the early 1970s, culminating in a nationwide voluntary ban in 1994. In July 2010, 17 states followed up with bans on its use in automatic dishwasher detergent.

In 2004, the European Union introduced regulations to require biodegradability in all detergents.

In 2011 the European Commission announced that the European Parliament had ordered a ban of phosphates in consumer laundry detergent by June 2013 and a ban in dishwasher detergent by January 2017.

Australia began phasing out the use of phosphates in its detergents in 2011, with an all-out ban expected to take effect in 2014.

Canada banned some phosphates in detergent in 2011.

Italy started phasing out phosphates in the 1980s.

Pursuant to findings published in 2006 by the Shenkar College of Engineering and Design indicating that liquid detergents are "much more environment-friendly" than powdered detergents, Israel's Ministry of the Environment began recommending that consumers prefer liquid detergent over powdered ones "for laundry which is not heavily stained."

Discussion of banning phosphates from detergents in the United States started because of pollution of the Great Lakes. Seventeen US states have partial or full bans on the use of phosphates in dish detergent, and two US states (Maryland and New York) ban phosphates in commercial dishwashing. In 1983 there was a corruption scandal in which industry sought to influence government regulators regarding the ban.

By the late 2000s, some dishwashing detergents still contained phosphorus, which several U.S. states had restricted or banned for use in dishwashing detergents.

== Environmental impact ==
Phosphates have low toxicity in the environment but cause nutrient pollution, a major water quality problem in many watersheds. Phosphates in water cause eutrophication of algae which creates conditions favorable to formation of harmful algal blooms. These blooms prevent light and oxygen from getting into the water, leading to the death of organisms in the ecosystem.

Studies have revisited the question of whether existing household phosphate bans are effective in reducing phosphorus concentration in waterways, and subsequent algal blooms. A 2014 case study of Vermont phosphate policies around Lake Champlain showed that while the bans reduced the phosphate contribution by treated wastewater from households to five percent of the total contribution, phosphate levels did not decline and in fact increased slightly, due primarily to increased contributions of similar magnitudes from stormwater runoff and agricultural sources. As a result, algal blooms have continued to worsen.

Most dishwasher detergent contains complex phosphates, as they have several properties that aid in effective cleaning. However, the same chemicals have been removed from laundry detergents in many countries as a result of concerns raised about the increase in algal blooms in waterways caused by increasing phosphate levels (see eutrophication).

Phosphorus that runs into freshwater lakes and rivers can cause algal blooms. Phosphate-free detergent reduces the amount of phosphate that wastewater treatment plants must clean up.

From the 1960s–2010s the standard way to determine the amount of phosphate in water has been using colorimetry. It is possible to use optical sensors for measurements, which could be easier and cheaper, but this is not a common practice.

== Uses ==
Sodium tripolyphosphate was an excellent builder used in laundry detergent powders. However, due to issues of biodegradability many countries have banned the use of phosphates in detergents. Manufacturers are using substitutes such as EDTA and other biodegradable chemicals instead.

Phosphates bind calcium and magnesium ions to prevent 'hard-water' type limescale deposits. They can cause ecological damage, so their use is starting to be phased out. Phosphate-free detergents are sold as eco-friendly detergents.

In the 21st century phosphates began to be reduced in percentage terms as an ingredient, leading to a New York Times report that said "low- or phosphate-free dishwasher detergents it tested, including those from environmentally friendly product lines that have been on the market for years, none matched the performance of products with phosphates".

== Society and culture ==
=== History of discussion ===
There was a conflict between industry which wanted to continue to use phosphates and advocates of banning who wanted to preserve water quality.

In the 1960s scientists recognized that phosphates in water caused eutrophication. There was disagreement at that time about whether water with high phosphate came to have the chemical because of somehow being polluted with it. By the 1970s it was established that high phosphate levels in water were a consequence of pollution. Discussion began about how to respond to the effects of phosphates as a pollutant in both fresh and marine water.

=== Marketing ===
In the USA, detergent companies claimed it is not cost effective to make separate batches of detergent for the states with phosphate bans, although detergents are typically formulated for local markets. Most have voluntarily removed phosphates from all dishwasher detergent. According to The Washington Post, phosphorus keeps "minerals from interfering with the cleaning process and prevent food particles from depositing again on dishes." According to Time magazine, "One reason detergent makers have been using large amounts of phosphorus is that it binds with dirt and keeps it suspended in water, allowing the other cleaning agents to do their best work. Phosphorus is especially important in regions with hard water because the presence of lots of minerals can interfere with cleaning agents."

=== Marketplace response ===
Product testing by Consumer Reports found that new detergent formulations without phosphates, but with chemicals such as sodium citrate, polyacrylates, polycarboxylates, and tetrasodium etidronate did not wash dishes as well but were satisfactory replacement products. Similarly, testing found that phosphate bans in laundry detergent led to newer products which did not clean clothes as well but still could compete with the older products containing phosphate.

A 1973 paper in psychology predicted a consumer response from the perspective of removing a behavioral freedom.
