= Detergent enzymes =

Biological enzymes that are used as laundry detergents

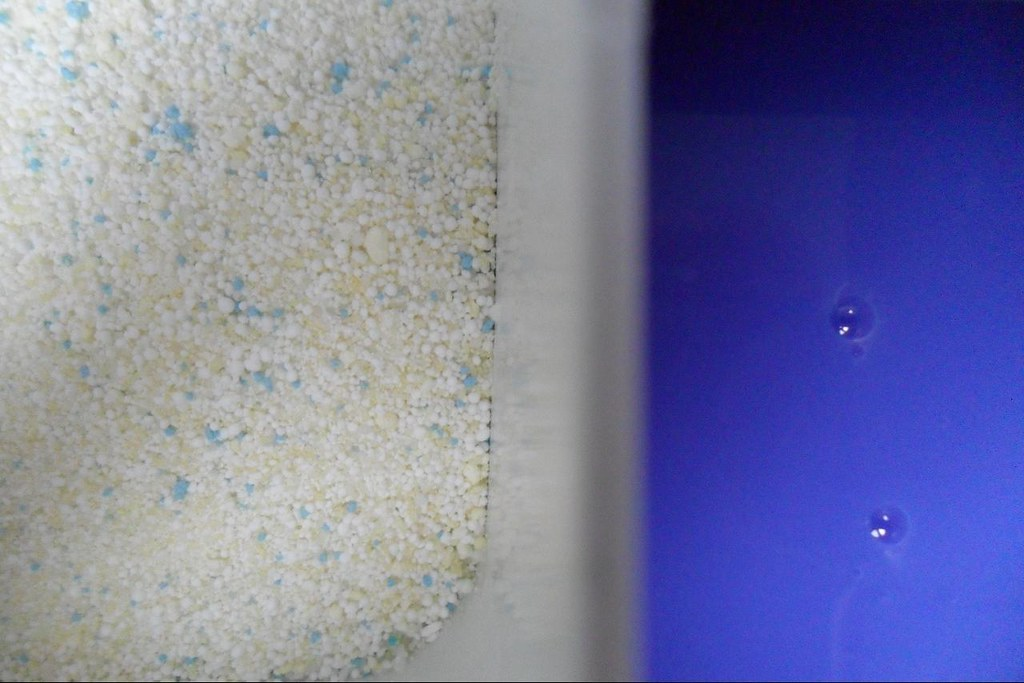
Detergent powder containing enzymes

Detergent enzymes are biological enzymes that are used with detergents. They catalyze the reaction between stains and the water solution, thus aiding stain removal and improving efficiency. Laundry detergent enzymes are the largest application of industrial enzymes.

They can be a part of both liquid and powder detergents.

== History ==
Otto Röhm introduced the use of enzymes in detergent by using trypsin extracted from the tissues of slaughtered animals. Röhm's formula, though more successful than German household cleaning methods, was considered unstable when used with alkali and bleach. In 1959, yields were improved by microbial synthesis of proteases.

== Properties ==
Laundry enzymes must be able to function normally in a wide array of conditions: water temperatures ranging from 0 to 60 °C; alkaline and acidic environments; solutions with high ionic strength; and the presence of surfactants or oxidizing agents.

== Types ==
The six classes of enzymes found in laundry detergent include proteases, amylases, lipases, cellulases, pectate lyases, and mannanases. They break down proteins (e.g. in blood and egg stains), starch, fats, cellulose (e.g. in vegetable puree), pectin, and mannans (e.g. in bean gum stains) respectively. All living organisms produce such enzymes, as they are essential to biological life. They are primarily used to digest food. The enzymes found in cleaning products are primarily extracted from bacteria and fungus.

One common bacteria that is used in industrial production of laundry enzymes is Bacillus subtilis, which produces the protease subtilisin.

== Merits ==
=== Household energy savings ===
For stain removal, conventional household washing machines use heated water, as this increases the solubility of stains. However, heating the water to the required temperature uses a considerable amount of energy; energy usage can be reduced by using detergent enzymes which perform well in cold water, allowing low-temperature washes and removing the need for heated water.

=== Delicate materials ===
Clothes made of delicate materials such as wool and silk can be damaged in high-temperature washes, and jeans and denim can fade due to their dark dyes. Low-temperature washes with detergent enzymes can prevent this damage, meaning that consumers can buy clothes from a wider range of materials without worrying about damaging them during washing.

=== Leather manufacturing ===
The leather industry was historically considered noxious due to the leather-making process. The traditional procedure involved soaking animal hides in a mixture of urine and lime to remove unwanted hairs, flesh and fat, then kneading them in dog or pigeon feces with bare feet. The subsequent discharge and refuse disposal was severely hazardous to both human health and the environment because of the high amounts of concentrated sulfide and chromium in the effluence.

This method was eventually discarded by the industry in the early 20th century following Röhm's discovery, replaced by a more eco-friendly process involving detergent enzymes. Consequently, hazardous sodium sulfide (used to remove animal hair from hides) usage is lessened by 60%, while water usage for soaking and hair cutting is lowered by 25%. Additionally, toxic pollution and emissions have been reduced by 30%. These enzymes have never completely substituted the industrial chemicals. Nevertheless, the working conditions, wastewater quality, and processing times have been greatly improved.

=== Replacement for phosphate and synthetic surfactants ===
Increased legislation has led to a limit on the laundry detergent industry's use of environmentally-unfriendly synthetic surfactants and phosphate salts. In a bid to produce more environmentally-friendly products, several detergent manufacturers have increased their use of enzymes in the production process in combination with lower concentrations of the surfactants and phosphates. These biologically active enzymes include bacteria, yeast, and mushrooms, which produce less chemical pollution and decompose certain toxicants.

=== Improved stain removal ===
Enzymes can remove stains that other laundry detergent additives cannot.

=== Reduced toxicity ===
Relative to other laundry additives, enzymes have a better safety profile.

== Public concerns ==
=== Damage to delicate materials ===
In contrast to the benefits of low-temperature washing, a study of the effects of detergent enzymes on untreated knit and woolen fabrics showed damage proportional to both soaking time and the enzyme concentration.

=== Skin allergy and testing ===
Consumers' responses to detergent enzymes have varied. It is reported that some Philippine consumers who are used to laundering by hand slightly suffered from powder detergents, which mainly consisted of laundry enzyme formulations. As a result, it was thought that laundry enzymes have the potential to increase the likelihood of getting occupational type 1 allergic responses. However, a large-scale skin prick test (SPT) containing 15,765 volunteers with 8 different types of detergent enzymes found that the allergy reaction is extremely rare among the public, with only 0.23% showing a reaction. The issue in Filipino consumers is believed to be the rushed hand-laundering method. After various tests with several volunteers worldwide, it is found that exposure to laundry enzymes leads to neither skin allergy (Type I sensitization) nor skin erosion.
