= Tetraacetylethylenediamine =

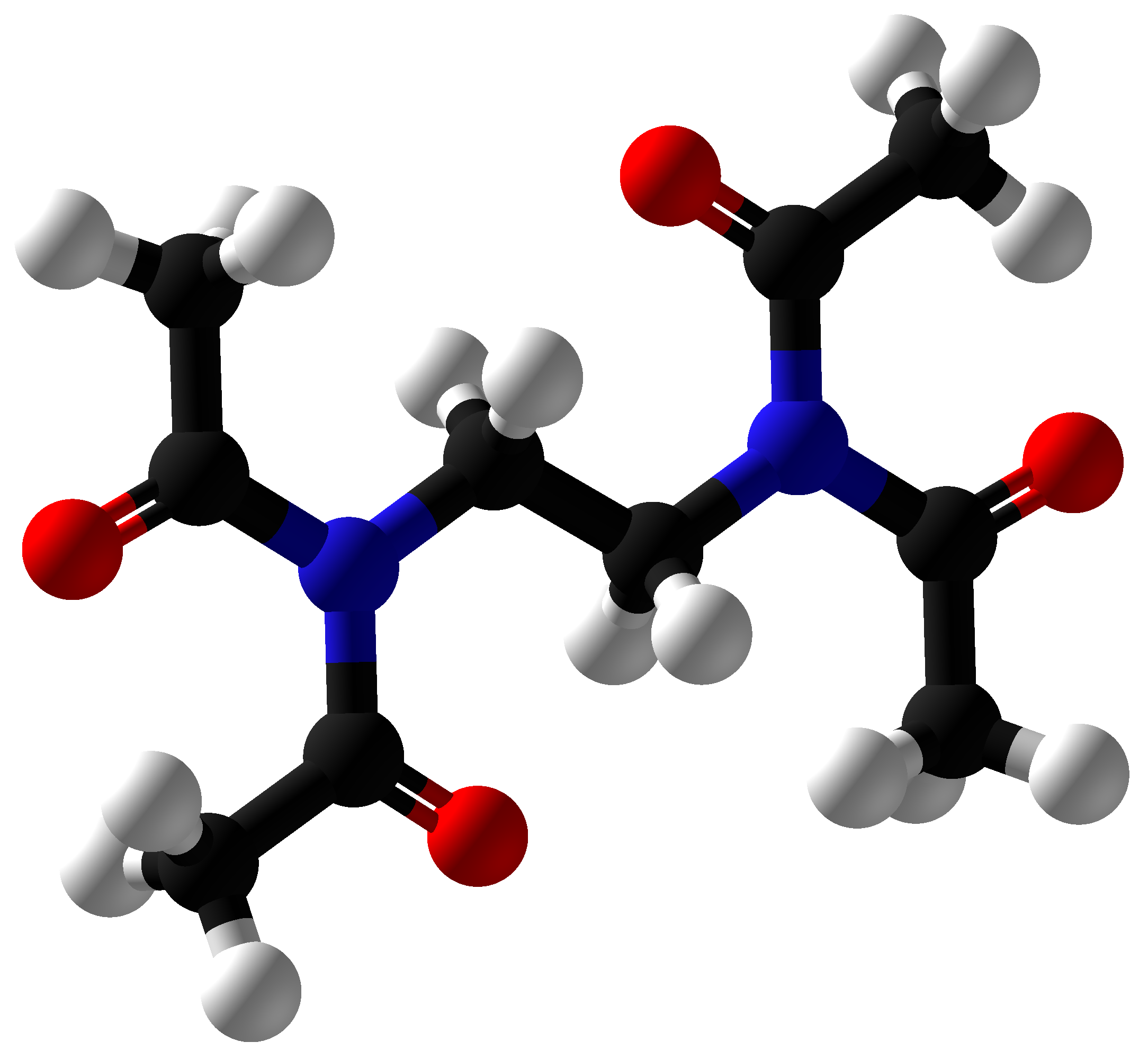

Names
- Preferred IUPAC name N,N′-(Ethane-1,2-diyl)bis(N-acetylacetamide)
- Other names TAED, N,N′-ethylenebis(diacetamide)

Identifiers
CAS Number	10543-57-4
3D model (JSmol)	Interactive image
ChemSpider	59725
ECHA InfoCard	100.031.009
PubChem CID	66347
UNII	P411ED0N2B
CompTox Dashboard (EPA)	DTXSID5040752
- InChI: InChI=1S/C10H16N2O4/c1-7(13)11(8(2)14)5-6-12(9(3)15)10(4)16/h5-6H2,1-4H3 Key: BGRWYDHXPHLNKA-UHFFFAOYSA-N; InChI=1/C10H16N2O4/c1-7(13)11(8(2)14)5-6-12(9(3)15)10(4)16/h5-6H2,1-4H3 Key: BGRWYDHXPHLNKA-UHFFFAOYAK
- SMILES: O=C(C)N(C(C)=O)CCN(C(C)=O)C(C)=O

Properties
Chemical formula	C_{10}H_{16}N_{2}O_{4}
Molar mass	228.248 g·mol^{−1}
Appearance	Colorless solid
Density	0.9 g/cm^{3}
Melting point	149 to 154 °C (300 to 309 °F; 422 to 427 K)
Solubility in water	0.2 g/L (20 °C (68 °F))
- Except where otherwise noted, data are given for materials in their standard state (at 25 °C [77 °F], 100 kPa). verify (what is ?) Infobox references

Tetraacetylethylenediamine, commonly abbreviated as TAED, is an organic compound with the formula (CH_{3}C(O))_{2}NCH_{2}CH_{2}N(C(O)CH_{3})_{2}. It is a white solid commonly used as a bleach activator in laundry detergents and in the production of paper pulp. TAED is synthesized through the acetylation of ethylenediamine.

== Use and mechanism of action ==
TAED is an important component of laundry detergents that use "active oxygen" bleaching agents. Active oxygen bleaching agents include sodium perborate, sodium percarbonate, sodium perphosphate, sodium persulfate (Na_{2}S_{2}O_{8}), and urea peroxide (CO(NH_{2})_{2}·H_{2}O_{2}) . These compounds release hydrogen peroxide (H_{2}O_{2}) during the wash cycle, but the release of hydrogen peroxide is low when these compounds are used at temperatures below 45 °C (113 °F). TAED and hydrogen peroxide react to form peracetic acid, a more efficient bleach, allowing lower temperature wash cycles, around 40 °C (104 °F). TAED was first used in a commercial laundry detergent in 1978 (Skip by Unilever). Currently, TAED is the main bleach activator used in European laundry detergents and has an estimated annual consumption of 75 thousand metric tons (83 thousand short tons).

=== Perhydrolysis ===
TAED reacts with alkaline peroxide via the process called perhydrolysis releasing of peracetic acid. The first perhydrolysis gives triacetylethylenediamine (TriAED) and the second gives diacetylethylenediamine (DAED):

TAED typically provides only two equivalents of peracetic acid, although four are theoretically possible. Competing with perhydrolysis, TAED also undergoes some hydrolysis, which is an unproductive pathway.

== Preparation ==
TAED is prepared in a two-stage process from ethylenediamine and acetic anhydride. The process is nearly quantitative.

== Properties ==
Powdered TAED is stabilized by granulation with the aid of the sodium salt of carboxymethylcellulose (Na-CMC), with the granules sometimes colored blue or green. Despite the relatively low solubility of TAED in cool water, (1 g/L at 20 °C (68 °F)), the granulate dissolves rapidly in the washing liquor.

The peroxyacetic acid formed has bactericidal, virucidal and fungicidal properties, thereby enabling TAED with percarbonate to disinfect and deodorize.

== Ecology ==
Tetraacetylethylenediamine is mostly non-toxic and easily biodegradable. TAED and its byproduct DAED have low aquatic ecotoxicity. TAED shows a very low toxicity in all exposure routes, is practically non-irritating effect on skin and eye, and does not give any indication of skin sensitization. It is not mutagenic and not teratogenic. TAED, TriAED and DAED are all completely biodegradable and substantially removed during wastewater treatment.
