= Sodium perborate =

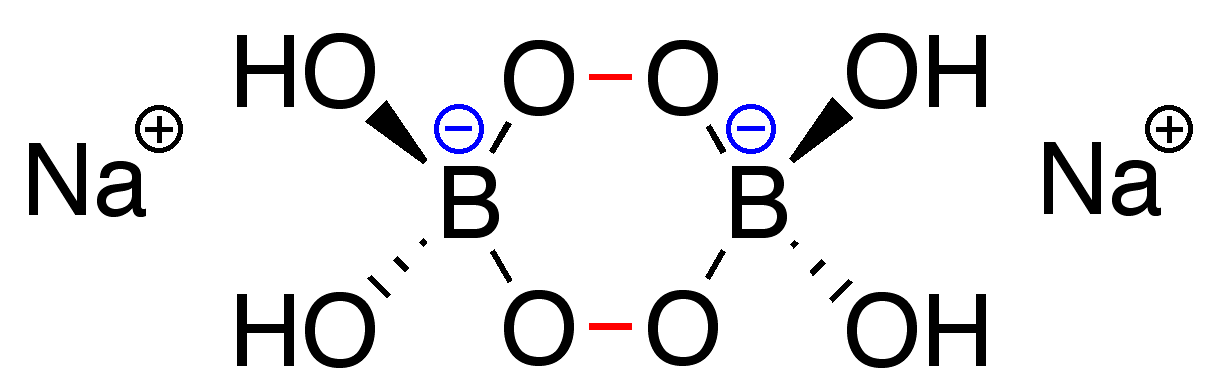
- Perborate unit in the "monohydrate"

Names
- Other names Sodium peroxoborate, PBS-1 ("monohydrate"), PBS-4 ("tetrahydrate")

Identifiers
CAS Number	7632-04-4; 10332-33-9 ("monohydrate"); 10486-00-7 ("tetrahydrate")
3D model (JSmol)	Interactive image
ChEBI	CHEBI:30178
ChemSpider	4574023
ECHA InfoCard	100.035.597
EC Number	231-556-4
PubChem CID	5460514
RTECS number	SC7350000
UNII	Y52BK1W96C; Y9UKD0XE6F ("monohydrate"); 822HSQ655R ("tetrahydrate")
UN number	1479
- InChI: InChI=1S/B2H4O8.2Na/c3-1(4)7-9-2(5,6)10-8-1;;/h3-6H;;/q-2;2*+1 Key: JBUKJLNBQDQXLI-UHFFFAOYSA-N; InChI=1/B2H4O8.2Na/c3-1(4)7-9-2(5,6)10-8-1;;/h3-6H;;/q-2;2*+1 Key: JBUKJLNBQDQXLI-UHFFFAOYAG
- SMILES: [Na+].[Na+].O[B-]1(OO[B-](O)(O)OO1)O

Properties
Chemical formula	NaBO_{3}·nH_{2}O
Molar mass	99.815 g/mol ("monohydrate"); 153.86 g/mol ("tetrahydrate")
Appearance	White powder
Odor	Odorless
Melting point	63 °C (145 °F; 336 K) ("tetrahydrate")
Boiling point	130 to 150 °C (266 to 302 °F; 403 to 423 K) ("tetrahydrate", decomposes)
Solubility in water	2.15 g/(100 mL) ("tetrahydrate", 18 °C)

Pharmacology
ATC code	A01AB19 (WHO)

Hazards
NFPA 704 (fire diamond)	1 1 0
Flash point	Non-flammable
Safety data sheet (SDS)	ICSC 1046
- Except where otherwise noted, data are given for materials in their standard state (at 25 °C [77 °F], 100 kPa). verify (what is ?) Infobox references

Sodium perborate are chemical compounds with chemical formula [Na^{+}]_{2}[B_{2}O_{4}(OH)_{4}]^{2−}(H_{2}O)_{x}. Commonly encountered salts are the anhydrous form (x = 0) and as a hexahydrate (x = 6). These two species are sometimes called, respectively, "monohydrate" or PBS-1 and "tetrahydrate" or PBS-4, after the historic assumption that NaBO_{3} would be the anhydrous form). Both the anhydrous and hexahydrate salts are white, odorless, water-soluble solids.

Peroxyborates are widely used in laundry detergents, as one of the peroxide-based bleaches.

Sodium perborate was first obtained in 1898, independently, by Sebastian Tanatar and by P. Melikoff and L. Pissadewsky; the researchers prepared sodium perborate by treating sodium borate with a solution of hydrogen peroxide and sodium hydroxide, but Tanatar also obtained sodium perborate by electrolysis of a solution of sodium borate.

== Structure ==
Unlike sodium percarbonate, the peroxyborates are not adducts of hydrogen peroxide. Rather, they contain a peroxyborate anion [(B(OH)_{2}OO)_{2}]^{2−}, which consists of a cyclic −B−O−O−B−O−O− core with a pair of hydroxy groups bonded to each boron atom. The ring adopts a chair conformation. The hexahydrate has the formula Na_{2}H_{4}B_{2}O_{8}·6H_{2}O, that is, Na_{2}H_{16}B_{2}O_{14} or NaH_{8}BO_{7}.

The anhydrous compound is commonly but incorrectly called a "monohydrate" with the historical but misleading formula NaBO_{3}·H_{2}O. Instead, a more descriptive formula is Na_{2}[(HO)_{2}B]_{2}(O_{2})_{2}. Likewise, the hexahydrate is usually called "tetrahydrate" and formulated as NaBO_{3}·4H_{2}O. Both forms are white, odorless, water-soluble solids. The "monohydrate" and the "tetrahydrate" are the commercially important forms.

A true tetrahydrate Na_{2}H_{4}B_{2}O_{8}·4H_{2}O, traditionally known as the "trihydrate", is also known but has no industrial significance. There is a CAS number for each of the three traditional "hydrates", the three "peroxyborate" versions of each (interpreted as a hydrogen peroxide adduct) and the poorly defined "anhydrate" NaBO_{3}, a total of seven.

== Chemistry ==
Sodium perborate hydrolyzes (i.e. breaks down in contact with water), producing hydrogen peroxide and borate.

This reaction proceeds through formation of a boron-hydroperoxide which enters an equilibrium with boric acid B(OH)_{3}, hydrogen peroxide H_{2}O_{2}, the hydroperoxyl anion ^{−}OOH, and the tetrahydroxyborate anion [B(OH)_{4}]^{−}:

[B(OH)_{3}(OOH)]^{−} ⇌ B(OH)_{3} + HO^{−}_{2}
B(OH)_{3} + HO^{−}_{2} + H_{2}O ⇌ [B(OH)_{4}]^{−} + H_{2}O_{2}

As the concentration of the solution increases, other peroxoborate species become significant. With excess H_{2}O_{2}, the anions [B(OH)_{2}(OOH)_{2}]^{−}, [B(OH)(OOH)_{3}]^{−}, and eventually [B(OOH)_{4}]^{−} appear. At high borate concentrations, the sodium perborate with a dimeric anion crystallizes out, due to its relatively low solubility.

The "monohydrate" form dissolves faster than the "tetrahydrate" and has higher heat stability; it is prepared by heating the "tetrahydrate". The commercial "anhydrate", or Oxoborate, is prepared by further heating of the "monohydrate" and is believed to consist of sodium borate and an uncharacterized boron–oxygen radical.

== Preparation ==
Sodium perborate is manufactured by reaction of borax Na_{2}B_{4}O_{7} and sodium hydroxide NaOH to give sodium metaborate NaBO_{2}, which is then reacted with hydrogen peroxide to give hydrated sodium perborate:

Na_{2}B_{4}O_{7} + 2 NaOH → 4 NaBO_{2} + H_{2}O
2 NaBO_{2} + 2 H_{2}O_{2} → Na_{2}B_{2}O_{4}(OH)_{4}

A surfactant may be added to control crystal size.

It may also be produced in the electrolysis of an aqueous solution containing borax, sodium carbonate and sodium bicarbonate (potassium dichromate is added to improve yield along with sodium silicate). A copper pipe is used as a cathode and platinum for the anode, the current being 6 amperes at 7 to 8 volts, and the temperature 10 °C.

== Uses ==
Sodium perborate serves as a stable source of active oxygen in many detergents, laundry detergents, cleaning products, and laundry bleaches. It is a less aggressive bleach than sodium hypochlorite and other chlorine-based bleaches, causing less degradation to dyes and textiles. Sodium perborate releases oxygen rapidly at temperatures greater than 60 °C. Addition of the activator, typically tetraacetylethylenediamine (TAED), makes it active at lower temperatures (40–60 °C).

The compound has antiseptic properties and can act as a disinfectant. It is also used as a "disappearing" preservative in some brands of eye drops.

=== Dental use ===
Sodium perborate monohydrate is quickly hydrolyzed into hydrogen peroxide and borate on contact with water. A 1979 double-blind crossover study suggests that hydrogen peroxide, which is released during the use of this product, may prevent or retard colonization and multiplication of anaerobic bacteria, such as those that inhabit oral wounds.

Sodium perborate is also present in some tooth bleaching formulas for non vital root treated teeth. The compound is inserted in the root canal and left in place for an extended period of time to allow it to diffuse into the tooth and bleach stains from the inside out. However, this use has been banned in the European Union.

=== Organic synthesis ===
Sodium perborate is also used as an oxidizing reagent in organic synthesis. For example, it converts thioethers into sulfoxides and sulfones. Another use of sodium perborate in organic synthesis is as a convenient alternative to H_{2}O_{2}, for example in the 2 step conversion of an aryl halide to a phenol (the first step is a Miyaura borylation).

Oxidation of Boronate with sodium perborate

== Safety ==
In the European Union, sodium perborate, like most other inorganic boron compounds, was classified as "carcinogenic, mutagenic, or toxic for reproduction" (CMR), category 1B of Regulation (EC) 790/2009, as a result of being included in Part 3 of Annex VI of the regulation 1272/2008 on Classification, Labelling and Packaging (CLP) of substances and mixtures. As a result, their use has been automatically banned in cosmetic products in the EU, in any concentration, starting 1 December 2010. That extends to the use of perborates for tooth whitening.

== Brands ==
=== Bocasan ===
Bocasan was an oral wound cleanser manufactured in the United Kingdom by Knox Laboratories Ltd of London from 1960–1975, before being rebranded as an Oral-B product

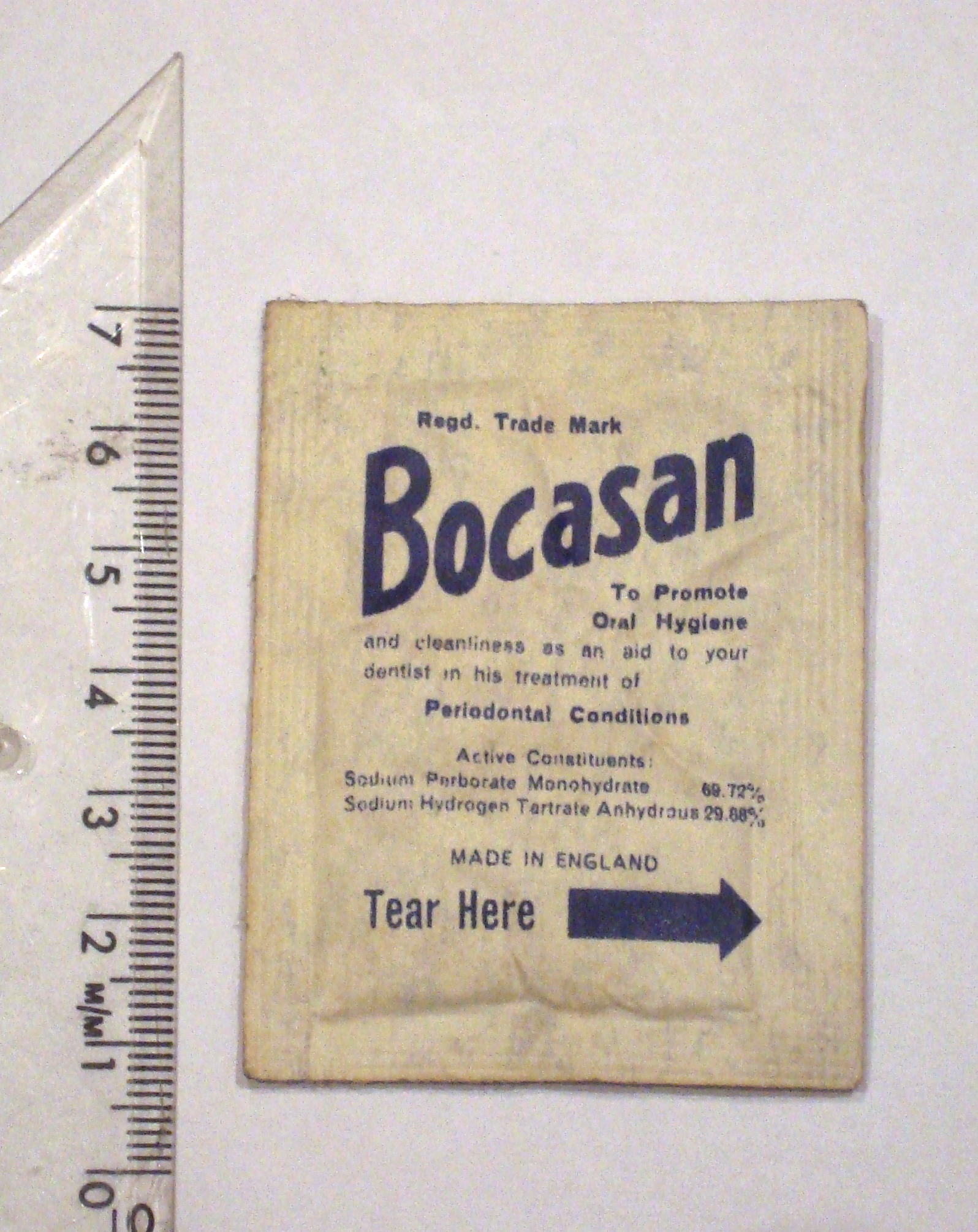
Bocasan dental rinse front

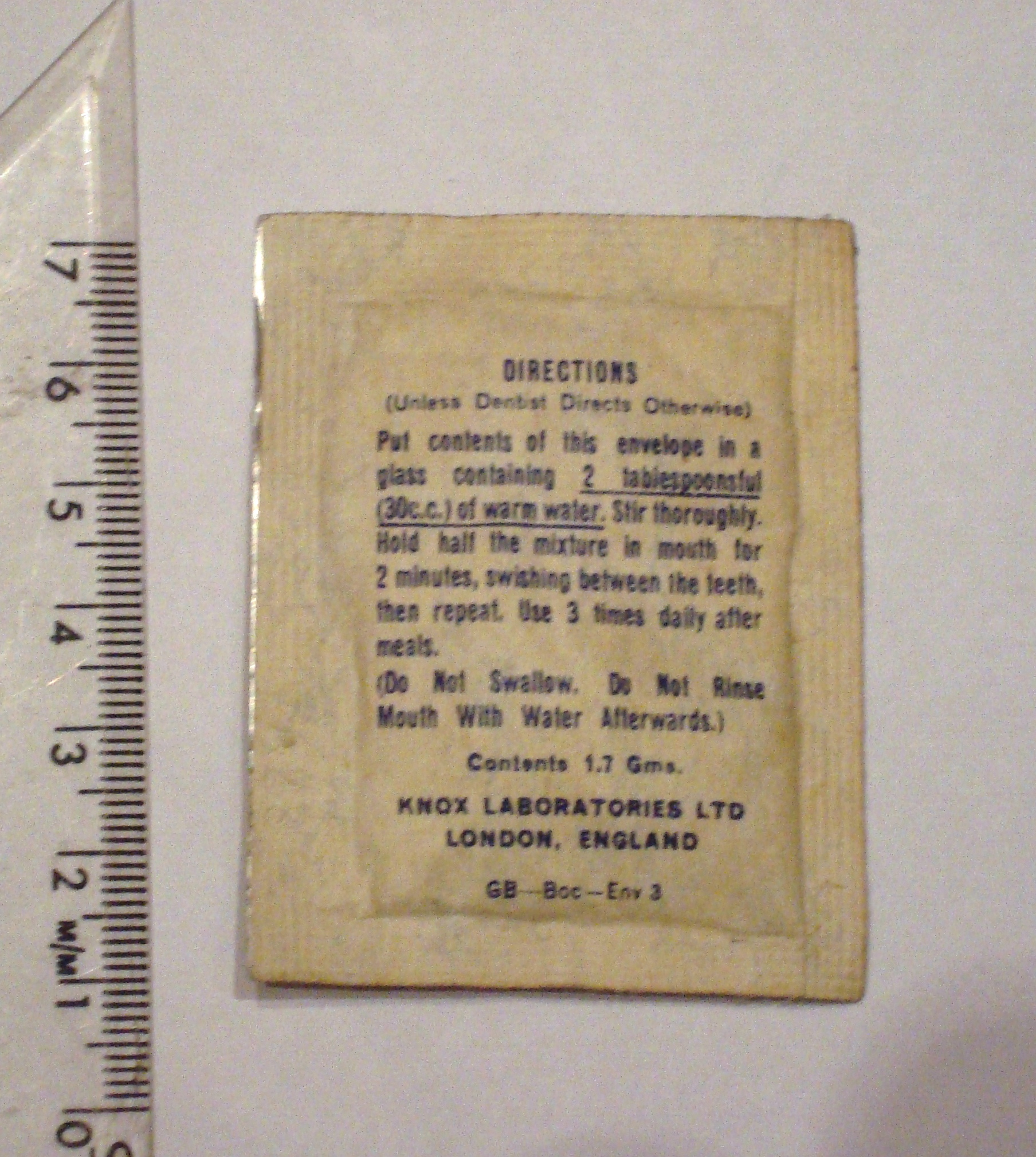
Bocasan dental rinse back

Production of Bocasan appears to have ceased by 2003. A similar product, Amosan was available for a period before also ceasing production in 2010. As of 2013, a Dutch pharmacy offers the same formulation under the name Bikosan

It was used to aid treatment, in adults or children over 5 years old, of periodontal conditions such as canker sores, denture irritation, orthodontic irritation, or after dental procedures.

Bocasan was packaged in a 1.7 gram envelope, and contained 69.72% sodium perborate monohydrate and 29.68% sodium hydrogen tartrate anhydrous. To use, the contents were dissolved in 30 cubic centimetres of warm water. Half the amount was swilled around the mouth for two minutes and discarded, and the procedure repeated with the remainder. Treatment was recommended three times a day after meals.

A 1979 double-blind crossover study suggests that hydrogen peroxide, which is released during the use of this product, may prevent or retard colonization and multiplication of anaerobic bacteria, such as those that inhabit oral wounds. A small (n=12) 1998 RCT shows that Bocasan combined with chlorhexidine mouthwash is better than chlorhexidine alone in preventing plaque. A further study (n=28) shows that Bocasan reduces the staining associated with chlorhexidine.

==== Drug facts ====
- Active ingredient: Sodium perborate monohydrate
- Inactive ingredients: Sodium hydrogen tartrate
- Purpose: Oral cleanser
- Normal use: Use up to three times daily, after meals or as directed by a dentist

=== Amosan ===
Amosan Oral Antiseptic Rinse, 2014

Amosan is an oral antiseptic rinse. It contains 68.635% sodium perborate monohydrate by weight. Sold as a powder customarily packaged in 1.7g envelopes, it reconstitution with warm water, after which it is used as a mouth rinse. It is used to aid in the prevention of, as well as speed the recovery from canker sores, denture irritation, orthodontic irritation, and oral injuries or after dental procedures.

==== History ====
Amosan was originally made by Oral-B; a mention of the powder appeared in the February 6, 1970 Federal Register. Between 2005 and 2010, Amosan was manufactured in Belgium and sold under the Oral-B brand, belonging to Procter & Gamble after its 2005 acquisition of Gillette. In December 2010, its use was banned in the EU, as the product is based on borate, which the union considers "carcinogenic, mutagenic, or toxic for reproduction".

Vintage Brands Limited began manufacturing and selling Amosan Oral Antiseptic Rinse in 2014 because many consumers were disappointed that it was no longer available. Product review pages on Amazon and public comment forums elsewhere indicate a high level of frustration with the discontinuation by users who could find no effective alternative treatment.

In April 2012, it was reported that Shoppers Drug Mart in Canada had produced a comparable product under their house brand: 'Life Brand Oral Wound Cleanser'. Also, Jean Coutu and Rexall has their own house brand versions.

== See also ==
- Amosan
- Sodium percarbonate
- Persil
