= Laundry detergent =

Type of detergent used for cleaning laundry

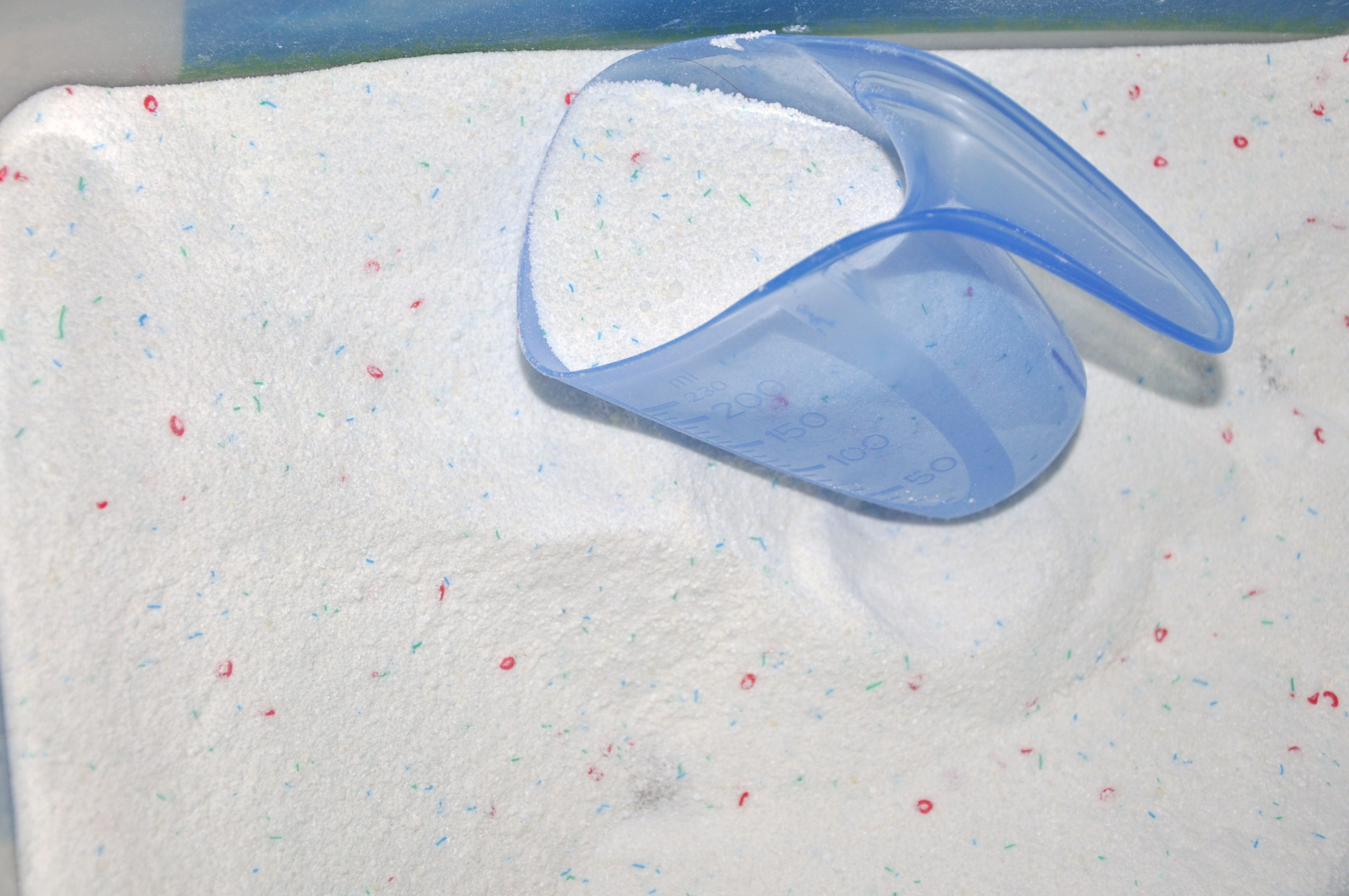
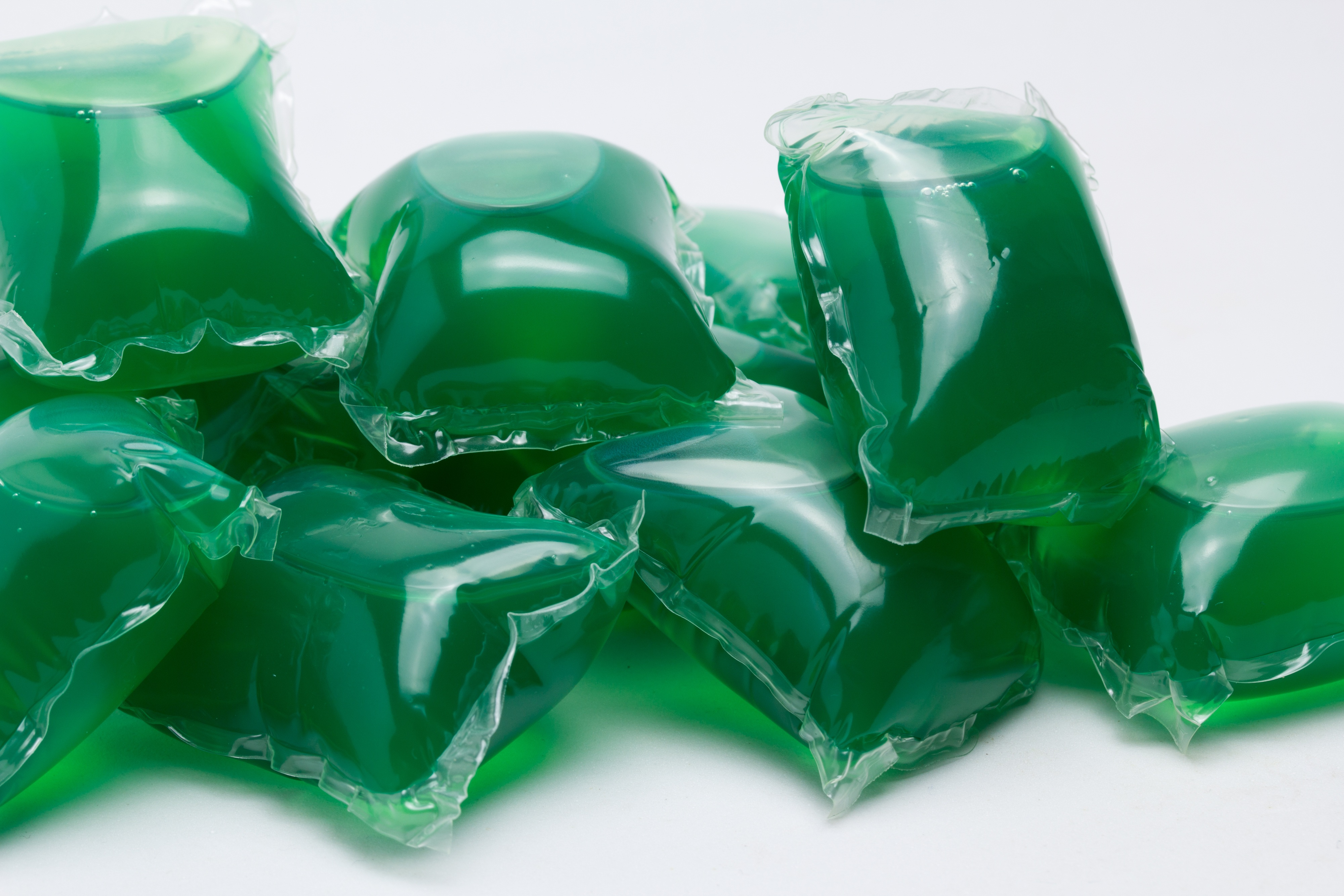
The two forms of laundry detergent: powder and liquid

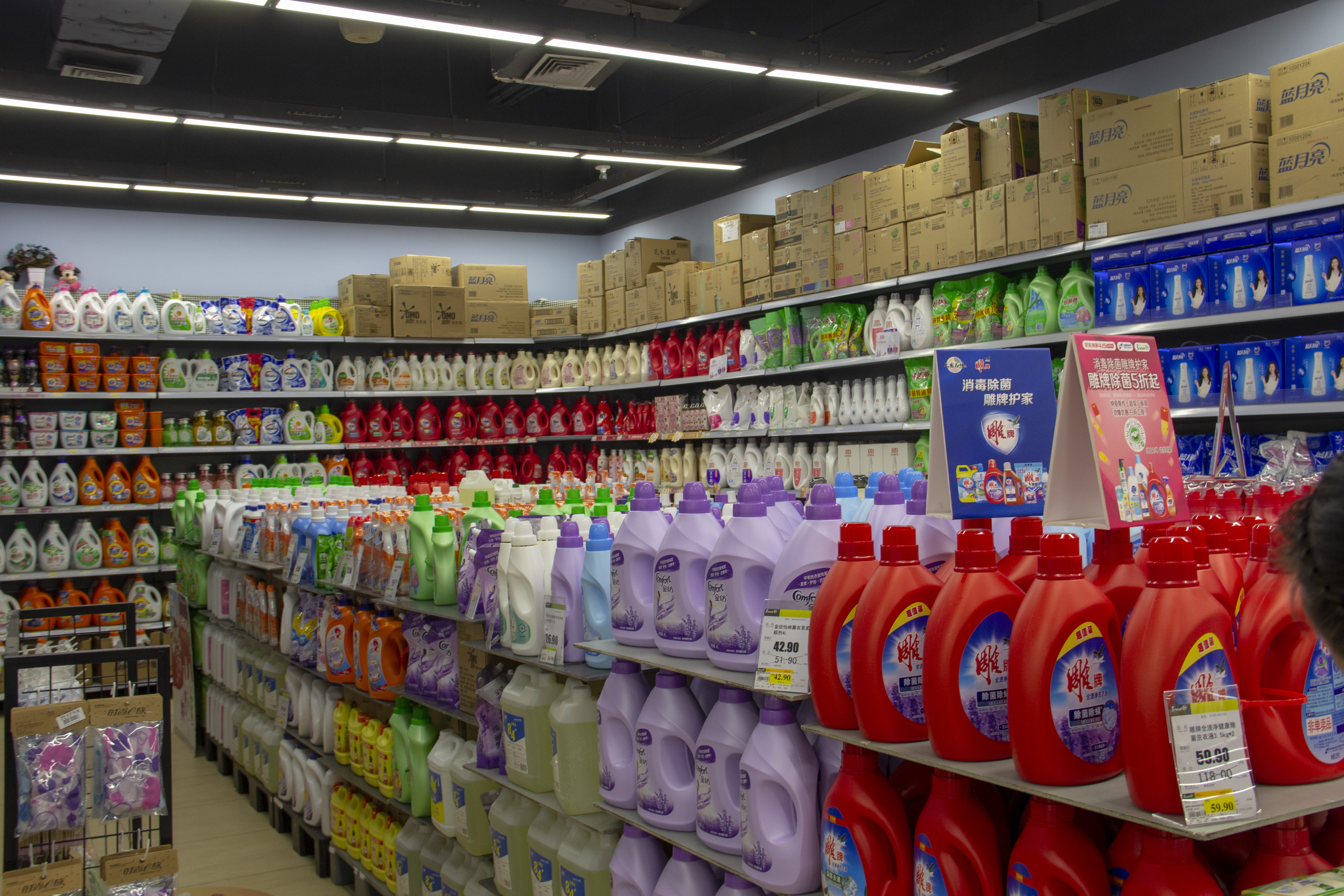
Liquid laundry detergents in a Chinese supermarket, April 2020

Laundry detergent is a type of detergent (cleaning agent) used for cleaning dirty laundry (clothes). Laundry detergent is manufactured in powder (washing powder) and liquid form.

While powdered and liquid detergents hold roughly equal share of the worldwide laundry detergent market in terms of value, powdered detergents are sold twice as much compared to liquids in terms of volume.

== History ==
FEWA, an early laundry detergent from Germany

From ancient times, chemical additives were used to facilitate the mechanical washing of textile fibers with water. The earliest recorded evidence of the production of soap-like materials dates back to around 2800 BC in ancient Babylon.

German chemical companies developed an alkyl sulfate surfactant in 1917, in response to shortages of soap ingredients during the Allied Blockade of Germany during World War I. In the 1930s, commercially viable routes to fatty alcohols were developed, and these new materials were converted to their sulfate esters, key ingredients in the commercially important German brand FEWA, produced by BASF, and Dreft, the U.S. brand produced by Procter & Gamble. Such detergents were mainly used in industry until after World War II. By then, new developments and the later conversion of aviation fuel plants to produce tetrapropylene, used in household detergents production, caused a fast growth of domestic use in the late 1940s.

== Soils ==
Washing laundry involves removing mixed soils from fiber surfaces. From a chemical viewpoint, soils can be grouped into:

- Water-soluble soils such as sugars, inorganic salts, urea, and perspiration.
- Solid particulate soils such as rust, metal oxides, soot (carbon black), carbonates, silicates, and humus.
- Hydrophobic soils such as animal fats, vegetable oils, sebum, mineral oil, and grease.
- Proteins such as blood, egg, milk, and keratin from skin. These require enzymes, heat or alkali to hydrolyze and denature them into smaller parts before they can be removed by the surfactants.
- Bleachable stains such as wine, coffee, tea, fruit juices, and vegetable stains. Bleaching is an oxidation reaction which turns the colored substance into a colorless one, which either stays on the fabric or may be easier to wash out.

Soils difficult to remove are pigments and dyes, fats, resins, tar, waxes, and denatured protein.

== Components ==
Laundry detergents may contain builders (50% by weight, approximately), surfactants (15%), bleach (7%), enzymes (2%), soil antideposition agents, foam regulators, corrosion inhibitors, optical brighteners, dye transfer inhibitors, fragrances, dyes, fillers and formulation aids.

=== Builders ===
Builders (also called chelating or sequestering agents) are water softeners. Most domestic water supplies contain some dissolved minerals, especially in hard water areas. The metal cations present in these dissolved minerals, particularly calcium and magnesium ions, can react with surfactants to form soap scum which is much less effective for cleaning and can precipitate onto both fabric and washing machine components. Builders remove mineral ions responsible for hard water through precipitation, chelation, or ion exchange. In addition, they help remove soil by dispersion.

The earliest builders were sodium carbonate (washing soda) and sodium silicate (waterglass). In the 1930s phosphates (sodium phosphates) and polyphosphates (sodium hexametaphosphate) were introduced, continuing with the introduction of phosphonates (HEDP, ATMP, EDTMP). While these phosphorus-based agents are generally non-toxic they are now known to cause nutrient pollution, which can have serious environmental consequences. As such they have been banned in many countries, leading to the development of phosphorus-free agents, such as polycarboxylates (EDTA, NTA), citrates (trisodium citrate), silicates (sodium silicate), gluconic acid and polyacrylic acid; or ion exchange agents like zeolites.

Alkali builders may also enhance performance by changing the pH of the wash. Hydrophilic fibers like cotton will naturally have a negative surface charge in water, whereas synthetic fibers are comparatively neutral. The negative charge is further increased by the adsorption of anionic surfactants. With increasing pH, soil and fibers become more negatively charged, resulting in increased mutual repulsion. The optimum pH range for good detergency is 9–10.5. Alkalis may also enhance wash performance via the saponification of fats.

Builder and surfactant work synergistically to achieve soil removal, and the washing effect of the builder may exceed that of the surfactant. With hydrophilic fibers like cotton, wool, polyamide and polyacrylonitrile, sodium triphosphate removes soil more effectively than a surfactant alone. It is expected that when washing hydrophobic fibers like polyesters and polyolefins, the effectiveness of the surfactant surpasses that of the builder, however this is not the case.

=== Surfactants ===
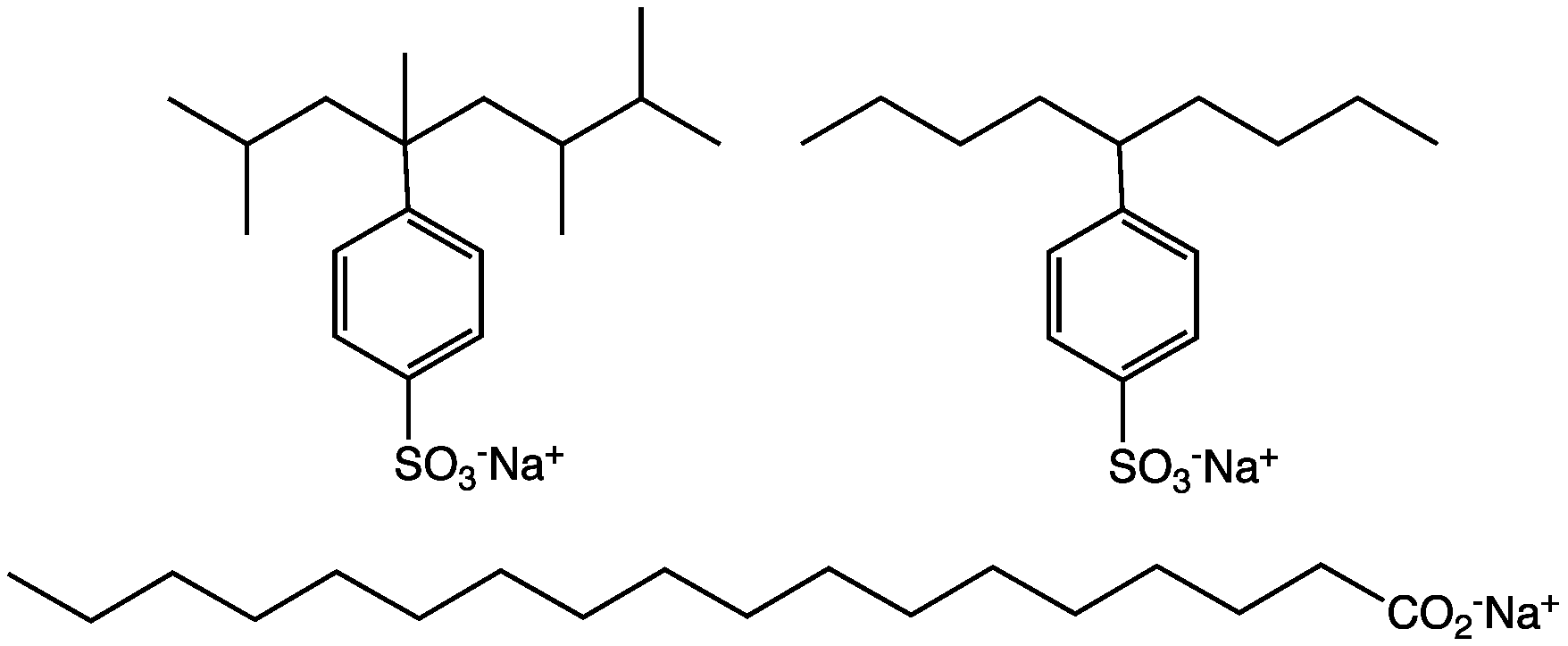
Anionic surfactants: branched alkylbenzenesulfonate, linear alkylbenzenesulfonate, and a soap.

Surfactants are responsible for most of the cleaning performance in laundry detergent. They provide this by absorption and emulsification of soil into the water and also by reducing the water's surface tension to improve wetting.

Laundry detergents contain mostly anionic and non-ionic surfactants. Cationic surfactants are normally incompatible with anionic detergents and have poor cleaning efficiency; they are employed only for certain special effects, as fabric softeners, antistatic agents, and biocides. Zwitterionic surfactants are rarely employed in laundry detergents mainly for cost reasons. Most detergents use a combination of various surfactants to balance their performance.

Until the 1950s, soap was the predominant surfactant in laundry detergents. By the end of the 1950s so-called "synthetic detergents" (syndets) like branched alkylbenzene sulfonates had largely replaced soap in developed countries. Due to their poor biodegradability these branched alkylbenzenesulfonates were replaced with linear alkylbenzenesulfonates (LAS) in the mid-1960s. Since the 1980s, alkyl sulfates such as SDS have found increasing application at the expense of LAS.

Since the 1970s, nonionic surfactants like alcohol ethoxylates have acquired a higher share in laundry detergents. In the 1990s, glucamides appeared as co-surfactants, and alkyl polyglycosides have been used in specialty detergents for fine fabrics.

=== Bleaches ===
Despite the name, modern laundry bleaches do not include household bleach (sodium hypochlorite). Laundry bleaches are typically stable adducts of hydrogen peroxide, such as sodium perborate and sodium percarbonate; these are inactive as solids but will release hydrogen peroxide upon exposure to water. The main targets of bleaches are oxidisable organic stains, which are usually of vegetable origin (e.g. chlorophyll, anthocyanin dyes, tannins, humic acids, and carotenoid pigments). Hydrogen peroxide is insufficiently active as a bleach at temperature below 60 °C (140 °F), which traditionally made hot washes the norm. The development of bleach activators in the 1970s and 1980s allowed for cooler washing temperatures to be effective. These compounds, such as tetraacetylethylenediamine (TAED), react with hydrogen peroxide to produce peracetic acid, which is an even more effective bleach, particularly at lower temperatures.

=== Enzymes ===
The use of enzymes for laundry was introduced in 1913 by Otto Rohm. The first preparation was a pancreatic extract obtained from slaughtered animals, which was unstable against alkali and bleach. Only in the latter part of the century with the availability of thermally robust bacterial enzymes did this technology become mainstream.

Enzymes are required to degrade stubborn stains composed of proteins (e.g., milk, cocoa, blood, egg yolk, grass), fats (e.g., chocolate, fats, oils), starch (e.g., flour and potato stains), and cellulose (damaged cotton fibrils, vegetable and fruit stains). Each type of stain requires a different type of enzyme: proteases (savinase) for proteins, lipases for greases, α-amylases for carbohydrates, and cellulases for cellulose.

=== Other ingredients ===
Many other ingredients are added depending on the expected circumstances of use. Such additives modify the foaming properties of the product by either stabilizing or counteracting foam. Other ingredients increase or decrease the viscosity of the solution, or solubilize other ingredients. Corrosion inhibitors counteract damage to washing equipment. Dye transfer inhibitors prevent dyes from one article from coloring other items, these are generally polar water-soluble polymers such as polyvinylpyrrolidone, to which the dyes preferentially bind. Antiredeposition agents such as carboxymethyl cellulose are used to prevent fine soil particles from reattaching to the product being cleaned. Commercial or industrial laundries may make use of a laundry sour during the final rinse cycle to neutralise any remaining alkali surfactants and remove acid-sensitive stains.

A number of ingredients affect aesthetic properties of the item to be cleaned or the detergent itself before or during use. These agents include optical brighteners, fabric softeners, and colorants. A variety of perfumes are also components of modern detergents, provided that they are compatible with the other components and do not affect the color of the cleaned item. The perfumes are typically a mixture of many compounds, common classes include terpene alcohols (citronellol, geraniol, linalool, nerol) and their esters (linalyl acetate), aromatic aldehydes (helional, hexyl cinnamaldehyde, lilial) and synthetic musks (galaxolide).

== Market ==
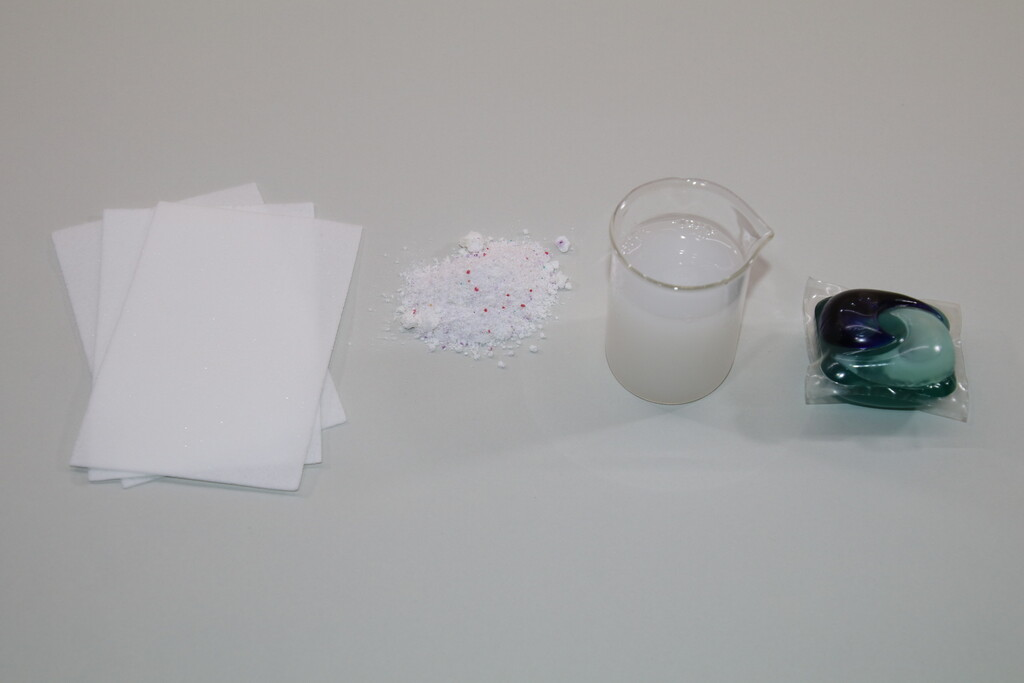
Laundry detergent: sheets, powder, liquid and pod.

Worldwide, while liquid and powdered detergents hold roughly equal market share in terms of value, powdered laundry detergent is more widely used. In 2018, sales of powdered detergent measured 14 million metric tons, double that of liquids. While liquid detergent is widely used in many Western countries, powdered detergent is popular in Africa, India, China, Latin America, and other emerging markets. Powders also hold significant market share in eastern Europe and in some western European countries due to their advantage over liquids in whitening clothes. According to Desmet Ballestra, designer and builder of chemical plants and detergent-making equipment, powdered detergents have a 30–35% market share in western Europe. According to Lubrizol, the powdered detergent market is growing by 2 percent annually.

== Environmental concerns ==
Phosphates in detergent became an environmental concern in the 1950s and the subject of bans in later years. Phosphates make laundry cleaner but also cause eutrophication, particularly with poor wastewater treatment.

A 2013 academic study of fragranced laundry products found "more than 25 VOCs emitted from dryer vents, with the highest concentrations of acetaldehyde, acetone, and ethanol. Seven of these VOCs are classified as hazardous air pollutants (HAPs) and two as carcinogenic HAPs (acetaldehyde and benzene)".

The EEC Directive 73/404/EEC stipulates an average biodegradability of at least 90% for all types of surfactants used in detergents. The phosphate content of detergents is regulated in many countries, e.g., Austria, Germany, Italy, the Netherlands, Norway, Sweden, Switzerland, United States, Canada, and Japan.

== See also ==
- Laundry detergent pod
- List of cleaning products
