= Sodium percarbonate =

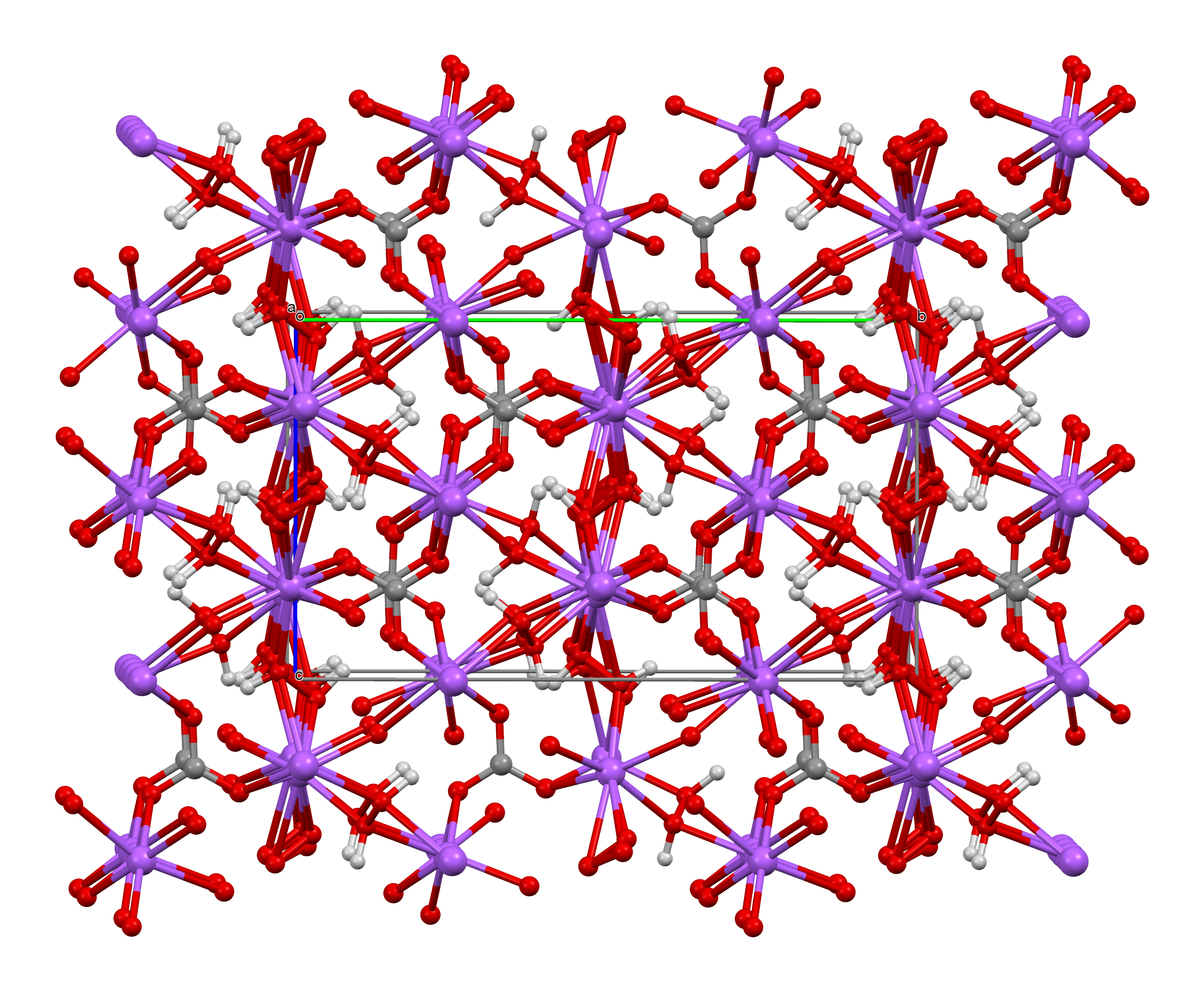
- Crystal structure at 100 K

Names
- IUPAC name sodium carbonate—hydrogen peroxide (2/3)
- Other names: Sodium carbonate peroxide; Sodium carbonate sesquiperhydrate; PCS; SPC; solid hydrogen peroxide; Sodium carbonate peroxyhydrate

Identifiers
CAS Number	15630-89-4
3D model (JSmol)	Interactive image
ChemSpider	140471
ECHA InfoCard	100.036.082
EC Number	239-707-6
PubChem CID	159762
RTECS number	FG0750000
UNII	Z7G82NV92P
UN number	3378
CompTox Dashboard (EPA)	DTXSID3029736
- InChI: InChI=1S/CH2O4.Na/c2-1(3)5-4;/h4H,(H,2,3);/q;+1/p-1 Key: MWNQXXOSWHCCOZ-UHFFFAOYSA-M; InChI=1S/CH2O4.Na/c2-1(3)5-4;/h4H,(H,2,3);/q;+1/p-1 Key: MWNQXXOSWHCCOZ-REWHXWOFAO; Key: MWNQXXOSWHCCOZ-UHFFFAOYSA-M
- SMILES: [Na+].[O-]C(=O)OO

Properties
Chemical formula	2 Na_{2}CO_{3} · 3 H_{2}O_{2}
Molar mass	157.009 g·mol^{−1}
Appearance	White solid
Density	2.01 g/cm^{3} at 20.4 °C (68.7 °F)
Solubility in water	150 g/L at 20 °C (68 °F)

Hazards
- GHS labelling
Pictograms	(GHS03: Oxidizing) (GHS05: Corrosive) (GHS07: Exclamation mark)
Signal word	Danger
Hazard statements	H272, H302, H318, H401
Precautionary statements	P210, P220, P264, P280, P301+P312+P330, P305+P351+P338+P310, P370+P378, P501
NFPA 704 (fire diamond)	2 0 0 OX
- Lethal dose or concentration (LD, LC)
LD_{50} (median dose)	1034 mg/kg (Oral, rat); >2000 mg/kg (Dermal, rabbit)

Related compounds
Other anions	Sodium carbonate; Sodium bicarbonate
Related compounds	Sodium perborate; Sodium persulfate
- Except where otherwise noted, data are given for materials in their standard state (at 25 °C [77 °F], 100 kPa). Infobox references

Sodium percarbonate or sodium carbonate peroxide is an inorganic compound with the formula 2 Na_{2}CO_{3} · 3 H_{2}O_{2}. It is an addition compound, specifically a co-crystal, formed by sodium carbonate ("soda ash" or "washing soda") and hydrogen peroxide (that is, a perhydrate). It is a colorless, crystalline, hygroscopic, and water-soluble solid. It is sometimes abbreviated as SPC. It contains 32.5% by weight of hydrogen peroxide.

The product is used in some eco-friendly bleaches and other cleaning products.

== History ==
Sodium percarbonate was first prepared in 1899 by the Russian chemist Sebastian Moiseevich Tanatar (7 October 1849 – 30 November 1917).

== Structure ==
At room temperature, solid sodium percarbonate has the orthorhombic crystal structure, with the Cmca crystallographic space group. The structure changes to Pbca as the crystals are cooled below about −30 °C (−22 °F).

== Chemistry ==
Dissolved in water, sodium percarbonate yields a mixture of hydrogen peroxide, sodium cations (Na^{+}), and carbonate (CO^{2−}_{3}).

2 Na_{2}CO_{3}·3 H_{2}O_{2} → 3 H_{2}O_{2} + 4 Na^{+} + 2 CO^{2−}_{3}

== Production ==
Sodium percarbonate is produced industrially by crystallization of a solution of sodium carbonate and hydrogen peroxide, with attention to the pH and concentrations. This method is also convenient for the laboratory preparation. Alternatively, dry sodium carbonate may be treated directly with concentrated hydrogen peroxide solution.

World production capacity of this compound was estimated at several hundred thousand tons for 2004.

== Uses ==
As an oxidizing agent, sodium percarbonate is an ingredient in a number of home and laundry cleaning products, including non-chlorine bleach products such as Oxyper, OxiClean, certain Tide laundry detergents, and Vanish.

Many commercial products mix a percentage of sodium percarbonate with sodium carbonate. The average "Oxy" product in the supermarket contains 35–40% sodium percarbonate with about 5% active oxygen when titrated.

Sodium percarbonate is also used as a cleaning agent in homebrewing.

Sodium percarbonate can be used in organic synthesis as a convenient source of anhydrous H_{2}O_{2}, in particular in solvents that cannot dissolve the carbonate but can leach the H_{2}O_{2} out of it. A method for generating trifluoroperacetic acid in situ for use in Baeyer–Villiger oxidations from sodium percarbonate and trifluoroacetic anhydride has been reported; it provides a convenient and cheap approach to this reagent without the need to obtain highly concentrated hydrogen peroxide.
