= List of Procter & Gamble brands =

Procter & Gamble (P&G) is an American multinational consumer goods corporation with a portfolio of brands.

== Brands with net sales of more than US$1 billion annually ==
As of 2015, the company stated it owned the following brands with net annual sales of more than $1 billion:

- Always menstrual hygiene products
- Ariel laundry detergent
- Bounty paper towels, sold in the United States and Canada
- Cascade dishwashing liquid
- Charmin bathroom tissue and moist towelettes
- Crest toothpaste
- Dawn dishwashing liquid
- Downy fabric softener
- Fairy washing up liquid
- Febreze odor eliminator
- Gain laundry detergents, liquid fabric softener, dryer sheets and dish washing liquid
- Gillette razors, shaving soap, shaving cream, body wash, shampoo, deodorant and anti-perspirant
- Head & Shoulders shampoo
- Ivory dishwashing liquid
- Joy dishwashing liquid
- Lenor fabric softener
- Luvs disposable diapers and moist towelettes
- Olay personal and beauty products
- Oral-B oral hygiene products
- Pampers & Pampers Kandoo and Luvs disposable diapers and moist towelettes. The 2014 Financial Report lists Pampers as Procter & Gamble's largest brand.
- Pantene haircare products
- SK-II beauty products
- Tide laundry detergents and products
- Vicks cough and cold products

== Brands by product type ==
=== Dishwashing ===
- Cascade dishwasher detergent
- Dawn dishwashing liquid
- Fairy washing-up liquid
- Gain dishwashing liquid
- Ivory dishwashing liquid
- Joy dishwashing liquid (outside the United States)

=== Menstrual hygiene ===
- Always pads and menstrual hygiene products
- Tampax tampons
- Whisper menstrual hygiene products

=== Haircare ===
- Ascend hair care products
- Aussie haircare (shampoos/conditioners/styling aids)
- Braun hair care and grooming products
- Frederic Fekkai hair care products sold
- Head & Shoulders shampoo
- Herbal Essences hair care products (formerly part of Clairol)
- Mielle hair care products
- Nicky Clarke hair products
- Pantene hair care products (purchased from Hoffmann-La Roche in 1985)
- Vidal Sassoon haircare products (purchased in 1984 from Vidal Sassoon)

=== Healthcare products ===
- Align probiotics
- Crest toothpaste
- Femibion (acquired from Merck Group)
- Fixodent denture adhesive
- Iliac/Nasivin (acquired from Merck Group)
- Metamucil laxative/fiber supplement (acquired G. D. Searle & Company in 1985)
- Neurobion (acquired from Merck Group)
- New Chapter dietary supplements
- Oral-B toothbrushes and other oral hygiene products
- Pepto-Bismol over-the-counter drug for minor digestive system upset (acquired as part of Norwich Eaton Pharmaceuticals in 1982)
- Prilosec OTC (licensed from AstraZeneca)
- Rolaids (acquired in 2024 from Lil' Drug Store Products)
- Sangobion (acquired from Merck Group)
- Scope mouthwash
- Seven Seas (acquired from Merck Group)
- Vicks cough and cold products

=== Household ===
- 9 Elements cleaning products
- Ace stain remover liquid/laundry detergent
- Ambi Pur air freshener
- Fairy (known as Dreft in the Netherlands and Yes in Sweden and Norway) dishwashing liquid, toilet soap, household soap, laundry detergent and dishwasher detergent
- Febreze odor control
- Flash cleaning products
- Jar dishwashing liquid and dishwasher detergent
- Mif (Russian: Миф) dishwashing liquid and dishwasher detergent
- Mr. Clean household cleaners
- Pampers disposable diapers
- Puffs tissues
- Luvs disposable diapers
- Safeguard soap
- Swiffer cleaning products
- Microban cleaning products
- Gala (Ukrainian: Гала) dishwashing liquid and dishwasher detergent

=== Laundry detergents ===
- Ariel laundry detergent
- Bold laundry detergent
- Bonux laundry detergent
- Bounce fabric-softener sheet for dryers
- Cheer laundry detergent
- Daz laundry detergent
- Dreft laundry detergent
- Era laundry detergent
- Fairy laundry detergent
- Gain laundry detergent, scent booster, fabric softener, dryer sheets.
- Ola laundry soap
- PMC laundry soap
- Tide laundry detergent (known as Dash in the Netherlands and Belgium)
- Lenor fabric softener
- Mif (Russian: Миф) laundry detergent
- Gala (Ukrainian: Гала) laundry detergent

=== Skin care ===
- Fresco bar soap
- Ivory bar
- Native deodorants, shampoos, body wash, skin care and hair care products
- Old Spice deodorants, anti perspirants, body wash, bar soap, aftershave, skin care and hair care products
- Secret antiperspirants and deodorants
- Olay body washes, beauty bar soap, lotions, face creams.

== Divested brands ==
Brands owned by Procter & Gamble in the past, but since divested:

- Actonel (pharmaceutical division was spun off into Warner Chilcott in 2009)
- Aleve, naproxen sodium (NSAID) drug, acquired by Bayer in 1997
- Asacol
- Attends line of incontinence and sanitary products. Sold to PaperPak in 1999.
- Biz originally an enzyme-based laundry pre-soak, later a detergent booster, then an all-fabric bleach, sold to Redox Brands in 2000
- Camay lightly scented bath soap, sold to Unilever in 2014/15.
- Chloraseptic throat medicine and lozenges sold to Prestige Brands.
- Cinch all-purpose glass and surface cleaner, was sold to Shansby Group, a San Francisco investment firm, later acquired by Prestige Brands.
- Clairol, formerly a personal products division of Procter & Gamble making hair coloring, hair spray, shampoo, hair conditioner, and styling products, sold to Coty on October 1, 2016
  - Balsam coloring brand (part of Clairol)
  - Natural Instincts hair coloring (part of Clairol)
  - Perfect Lights hair coloring (part of Clairol)
- Coast bar-soap brand sold to Dial Corporation in 2000 and is owned by High Ridge Brands. Dial is owned by Henkel.
- Comet, a long-time P&G brand of cleanser is owned by Prestige Brands
- Crisco (vegetable oil and shortening) sold to The J.M. Smucker Company then sold to B&G Foods
- Crush/Hires/Sun Drop carbonated soft drinks (sold to Cadbury Schweppes in late 1980s)
- Dantrium sold to JHP Pharmaceuticals and SpePharm
- Dash taken over by Dalli-Werke (dalli group)
- Dari Creme refrigerated margarine (Philippines), sold to San Miguel Corporation in 1994, under the Magnolia brand.
- Duncan Hines packaged cake mixes, sold to Aurora Foods (Pinnacle Foods) in 1998
- Duracell batteries sold to Berkshire Hathaway in 2016.
- Escudo (Safeguard soap in Mexico), sold to Kimberly-Clark in 2016.
- Fisher Nuts sold to John B. Sanfilippo and Son, Inc., in 1995
- Fit fruit and vegetable cleaning wash licensed to HealthPro Brands in January 2004
- Folgers coffee (except for its operations in Southeast Asia) was acquired by The J.M. Smucker Company based in Orrville, Ohio, in June 2008.
- Gleem toothpaste (still being made by P&G, merged into the Crest brand as Crest Fresh and White)
- Hawaiian Punch is owned by Keurig Dr Pepper
- Iams cat and dog foods, sold to Mars Incorporated in 2014.
- Infusium 23 (shampoos/conditioners) sold to Helen of Troy Limited's Idelle Labs unit in March 2009
- Jif (peanut butter) divested by Procter & Gamble in a spin-off to their stockholders, followed by an immediate merger with The J.M. Smucker Company in 2002
- Joy operations in the United States was sold to JoySuds LLC in September 2019.
- Lava sold to WD-40 in 1999
- Lilt Home Permanents, including "Push Button" Lilt, The First "Foam-In" Home Permanent In A Can. Sold To Schwartzkopf/DEP in 1987, later discontinued
- Max Factor (sold to Coty)
- Mayon cooking oil (Philippines)
- Millstone coffee was acquired by The J.M. Smucker Company as part of its Folger's coffee acquisition in Orrville, Ohio in June 2008, Discontinued since 2016.
- Monsavon soaps (France), sold to Sara Lee Corporation in 1998; owned by Unilever since 2009
- Noxzema skin cream and beauty products line sold to Alberto-Culver in 2008 (since owned by Unilever)
- Oxydol sold to Redox Brands in 2000; Oxydol was P&G's first popular laundry soap, then later became a laundry detergent after Tide was introduced in 1946.
- Perla laundry bar soap (Philippines), sold to SCPG Asia-Pacific Inc. in 2016
- Pert Plus was sold to Innovative Brands, LLC in July 2006.
- Prell shampoo sold to Prestige Brands International in 1999
- Primex shortening (sold to ACH in 2001)
- Pringles potato chips sold to Kellogg Company in June 2012
- Pur, brand of water filtration products. The brand was acquired from Recovery Engineering, Inc. in 1999 for approximately US$213 million. P&G sold Pur to Helen of Troy in January 2012 for an undisclosed amount.
- Royale (Canada) brand of toilet paper. The original product was merged into the Charmin brand; Irving Tissue then acquired the trademark and re-introduced the brand on its own products.
- Salvo brand of detergent tablets which was sold from around 1958 up to circa February 8, 1974-1978
- Spic and Span is owned by The Spic and Span Company, a division of Prestige Brands
- Star non-refrigerated margarine (Philippines), sold to San Miguel Corporation in 1994, under the Magnolia brand.
- Sunny Delight orange drink spun off in 2004.
- Sunshine margarine
- Sure anti-perspirant/deodorant line was sold in October 2006 to brand-development firm Innovative Brands
- Swisse the distribution rights of popular vitamin line were sold back to Swisse Wellness in 2017
- ThermaCare brand heat wraps sold to medical company Wyeth in 2008
- Thrill a peach-scented brand of dishwashing liquid, discontinued after 1976.
- Top Job all-purpose cleaner merged into the Mr. Clean brand in 1990
- Victor shortening
- Wash & Go haircare sold to Conter S.r.l. effective June 30, 2015
- Wella, Clairol, CoverGirl Makeup sold to Coty (2016)
- Whirl butter flavored oil (sold to ACH in 2001)
- White Rain shampoo/hair colour
- Wondra brand of hand lotion sold from 1976 to 1989.
- Zest deodorant body bar and body washes sold to High Ridge Brands Co. on January 4, 2011

== Discontinued brands ==
Brands owned by Procter & Gamble in the past, but since phased out:

- Banner, Summit, and White Cloud toilet tissues were merged with the company's best known bathroom tissue, Charmin. White Cloud was sold exclusively in Walmart stores in the U.S. before Kruger Products took over the brand and, with Walmart focusing on other brands, sold it in other stores
- Big Top, brand of peanut butter before Jif made its debut.
- Blossom, facial soap
- Bonus, brand of laundry detergent that had children's books or towels in every box; sold from 1940s to 1977.
- Citrus Hill, orange juice drink sold from 1983 to 1992
- Drene (a.k.a. Special Drene, Royal Drene), liquid shampoo. First shampoo made from synthetic detergent.
- Duz, powdered laundry soap and later, a powdered laundry detergent which had glassware and plates in each box; sold from 1920s to 1980.
- Encaprin, coated aspirin
- Fit, fruit and vegetable rinse, sold in the Philippines from 1998 to 2000.
- Fling, disposable dishcloth brand.
- Fluffo, golden yellow shortening sold mid-1950s to early 1960s.
- Fresco bath soap
- Gleem, toothpaste last made in 2014. Procter and Gamble plans to sell the Gleem formulation under the brand name Crest Fresh and White.
- Hidden Magic, hair spray, sold from circa 1964 to 1970.
- High Point instant decaffeinated coffee, which had Lauren Bacall in its commercials; produced from 1974 to 1986.
- Monchel, beauty soap
- Nutri Delight, an instant orange juice drink, sold in the Philippines from 1999 to 2000.
- OK, economy bar and packaged laundry soap.
- Rely, super-absorbent tampons in production from 1976 to 1980. It was pulled off the market during the TSS crisis of the early 1980s.
- Salvo, first concentrated tablet laundry detergent, which was discontinued c. February 8, 1974; later a dish detergent (sold in the U.S. 2004-2005; it is still sold in Latin America)
- Shasta, cream shampoo sold late 1940s-mid-1950s.
- Solo, liquid laundry detergent with fabric softener that was later merged into the Bold brand, and sold from 1979 to 1990.
- Star Soap and Star Naphtha Soap Chips
- Stardust, dry chlorine bleach (extensively test-marketed during the 1960s)
- Sunshine Margarine
- Swash, a range of laundry products and later a laundry appliance
- Teel, liquid dentifrice sold late 1930s to late 1940s.
- Tempo, brand of dry wipes, produced from 2000 to 2010.
- Tender Leaf, tea brand sold from 1940s to 1975.
- Thrill, dishwashing liquid last made in 1973
- Torengos, stackable, triangular-shaped, corn-based snack chip sold from 2001 to 2003
- Wondra lotion for dry skin. There were many formulas. (The first major brand to use "silicones") Sold from 1976 to 1989.
