= CR Brands =

CR Brands, Inc.
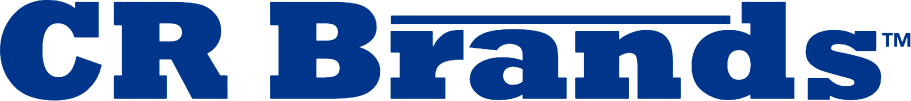
- Company type: Private
- Industry: Consumer goods
- Predecessor: Redox Brands; ChemPro, Inc.
- Founded: 2006; 20 years ago
- Founder: Richard Owen
- Defunct: March 2023; 3 years ago
- Fate: Chapter 7 bankruptcy
- Headquarters: West Chester, Ohio, U.S.
- Key people: Dan Mickelson (CEO)
- Products: Cleaning products
- Services: Private label
- Owner: Resilience Capital Partners
- Website: crbrandsinc.com

CR Brands, Inc. was an American private-label consumer goods company, owned by the Beachwood, Ohio-based Resilience Capital Partners. It was formed in 2006 by Allied Capital through a merger of two of its subsidiaries, Redox Brands and ChemPro, Inc. CR Brands was headquartered in the Cincinnati area (in West Chester, Ohio) and operated manufacturing facilities in Spartanburg, South Carolina. The company sold products under the Arm & Hammer and OxiClean brand names, which were licensed from Church & Dwight.

In March 2023, following the divestiture of its brands, it entered Chapter 7 bankruptcy and ceased operations.

== History ==
Allied Capital acquired ChemPro, Inc., a company founded by former Procter & Gamble employees that owned several former P&G brands including Oxydol, in March 2006. Allied then merged Redox and ChemPro, Inc., with the resulting company being renamed CR Brands. ChemPro's Chief Executive Officer retained the title through the merger with Richard Owen being named Chief Operating Officer. Manufacturing of the Redox brands would be moved to the ChemPro plants. The name "CR" was derived from the first initials of ChemPro and Redox.

In light of Allied Capital's financial difficulties, CR Brands was sold to Juggernaut Capital Partners LP in 2009. Juggernaut sold CR to Resilience Capital Partners' Resilience Fund III LP for undisclosed terms in September 2012.

In 2018, Resilience Capital announced that it had "brought in new leadership and implemented an ambitious growth plan that concentrated on growing the company’s differentiated niche brands". The same year, CR Brands sold the Mean Green brand and its U.S. and Canadian license for Roto-Rooter-branded drain care products to Medina, Ohio-based RPM International, owners of Rust-Oleum.

In 2019, the Oxydol brand was acquired by Fab+Kind Co.

In 2020, CR Brands sold its Biz and Dryel brands to Greenwood Village, Colorado-based Scott's Liquid Gold Inc. (SLG) for undisclosed terms.

The company filed for Chapter 7 bankruptcy liquidation on March 16, 2023. The company listed creditors of between 100 and 199, zero assets (the company had already spun off all its assets prior to the bankruptcy filing), and liabilities of $21.9 million in its bankruptcy petition, which was filed in the U.S. Bankruptcy Court in Cleveland.

== Brands ==
- Biz
- Oxydol
- Dryel
- Mean Green
- Pine Power
- Magnum Power

== See also ==
- ChemPro, Inc.
- Redox Brands
- Prestige Brands, also owns former P&G brands
