= Costikyan =

Costikyan is a surname. Notable people with the surname include:

- Barbara Costikyan (1928–2020), American food writer
- Edward N. Costikyan (1924–2012), American politician
- Greg Costikyan (born 1959), American game designer and science fiction writer
- Granger Kent Costikyan (1907–1998), American banker
