= Arthur C. Fatt =

- Born: Arthur Cornell Fatt; 1905
- Died: 1999 (age 94); Delray Beach, Florida
- Occupation: Advertising executive
- Spouse(s): Virginia Finder Gernsback (divorced); Barbara Cappeau (predeceased)
- Children: Barbara Costikyan; Marjorie Chester

Arthur C. Fatt (1905–1999) was an American advertising executive at the Grey Advertising Agency.

== Biography ==
Fatt was born in 1905. In 1921, he joined the Grey Advertising Agency founded by Lawrence Valenstein in 1917. The company's original focus was to publish direct mailings for the furrier industry which morphed into a magazine named Furs and Fashions. In 1925, the firm, renamed the Grey Advertising Agency, became a full-fledged advertising agency and differentiated itself from its competitors by using a team approach to advertising that closely worked with its customers and conducted extensive marketing research. Grey focused on developing a brand through pre-selling and building a market for it. Fatt served as the primary salesman while Valenstein served as administrator. In the 1930s the firm focused on soft goods. In the 1940s, the firm was billing $1 million per year. In 1947, after winning Gruen watch account, billings reached $10 million. In 1955, after winning the Block Drug account, Grey's billings reached $30 million. In 1956, Valenstein became chairman of the board and Fatt became president. In 1957, the firm developed the widely successful "Leaving now for Trenton, Philadelphia and Cucamonga!" campaign for Greyhound Bus with the tagline "Go Greyhound and leave the driving to us." Fatt was responsible for winning the accounts of Ford Motor Company, Procter & Gamble and Chock Full o' Nuts.

In 1961, billings reached $59 million and Valenstein became chairman of the executive committee; Fatt was named chairman and Herbert D. Strauss its president. In 1961, the firm expanded by opening an office in Los Angeles; and he expanded internationally by opening offices in London in 1962 and Japan in 1963. In 1964, billings reached $100 million. In 1965, the firm went public trading on the Nasdaq exchange and the firm also expanded into the use of psychographics (the analysis of consumer lifestyles). In 1966, Grey became one of the top 10 agencies in the U.S. In 1967, Strauss was named CEO and Edward H. Meyer, president. In 1969, Grey won the Kraft General Foods' Post cereal account and sales reached $230 million. In 1969, Strauss was named chairman and in 1970, Meyer was named CEO. In the 1970s, Grey was responsible for several popular ad campaigns including "Star Wars" toys for Kenner, aspirin and toothpaste for SmithKline, and Stove Top Stuffing for Kraft General Foods. In 1976, Fatt retired and was named founder/chairman.

He served as a director of the American Association of Advertising Agencies and the American Advertising Federation.

== Personal life ==
Fatt has been married twice. His first marriage to Virginia Finder Gernsback ended in divorce in 1946. His second wife, Barbara Cappeau, died in 1992. He has two daughters, Barbara Costikyan and Marjorie Chester. In 1977, his daughter Barbara, a freelance writer, married Democratic politician Edward N. Costikyan in a Unitarian ceremony. Fatt was of Jewish descent.
