= John Barry (WD-40) =

American businessman

- Born: John Steven Barry; 31 August 1924; Minneapolis, Minnesota
- Died: 3 July 2009 (aged 84)
- Education: University of Minnesota
- Occupation: Businessman

John Steven Barry (August 31, 1924 – July 3, 2009) was an American business executive who popularized WD-40, a water-displacing spray and solvent that had been created in the 1950s for use in the space program and spread its use in the consumer market.

== Early life and education ==
Barry was born in Minneapolis, Minnesota. He attended the University of Minnesota, from which he received a bachelor's degree in mechanical engineering. He was designated to participate in an officer's training program after enlisting in the United States Navy, as part of which he attended Columbia University and Harvard University. After his military service, he attended the MIT Sloan School of Management, earning a master's degree in business administration. He had been hired by 3M after graduation, but was called to active duty in the Navy during the Korean War.

== WD-40 ==
The product had originally been created by Rocket Chemical Company in 1953 as a degreasing and rust-preventing spray, with the name WD-40 coming from "water displacement, formulation successful in 40th attempt". One of its earliest users was Convair, which used the liquid to protect the outside of its SM-65 Atlas missiles. Norm Larsen, one of WD-40's creators, saw that Convair employees had found uses in their homes and started marketing the product in stores starting in 1958. Barry had no involvement in the company until he was hired in 1969 to succeed his father-in-law, Cy Irving, as its chief executive office and president, with one of his first actions being to rename the company WD-40 Company after its best-known product, reasoning that the company was not in the rocket business, after all.

Through creative marketing, Barry was able to significantly increase the product's market through additional advertising spending, improving the design of the product and its distinctive blue and yellow aerosol can, expanding sales into supermarkets to tap into impulse purchases and growing distribution from 1,200 wholesalers when he was hired to 14,000 within a decade in the United States and internationally. Barry was fond of using free product samples as a promotional tool, including 10,000 that were sent monthly to soldiers fighting in the Vietnam War to help maintain their weapons in the difficult climate. Barry steadfastly resisted the received wisdom that diversification was the optimal marketing strategy, resolutely keeping the company a one-product firm.

Though Barry acknowledged that other companies had products that were similar to his, he ensured that the firm jealously protected its trademark and that it never fully revealed the components used in its manufacture to the public. He refused to produce a private label version of the product for Sears, Roebuck and Company, emphasizing that at WD-40 "we are a marketing company" even if they "appear to be a manufacturing company". Company surveys showed that 80% of American households had the product, using it for the standard squeaky hinges and road tar removal, to ungluing tongues stuck to frozen metal and removing a python from under a bus.

Barry stepped down as president and CEO in September 1990 and was succeeded by Gerald C. Schleif. Barry left his role as chairman of the board in September 2000, and was followed in the post by Daniel W. Derbes. Sales grew from $2 million in 1970, his first full year at the company, to $90 million in 1990 and $317 million in the year before his death.

== Personal ==
Barry died at age 84 on July 3, 2009, due to pulmonary fibrosis in a skilled nursing center in La Jolla in San Diego, California. He was survived by his wife, the former Marian A. Irving; a daughter, Deborah B. Faneros of Camarillo, California, two sons, Stephen A. Barry of Escondido and Randy P. Barry of San Diego, and four grandsons.
