= Herbert D. Strauss =

Advertising executive

- Born: Herbert D. Strauss; April 21, 1909
- Died: March 17, 1973 (age 63); St. Thomas, U.S. Virgin Islands
- Education: B.A University of Pennsylvania
- Occupation: Advertising executive
- Children: 2
- Parent: Sarann Eisner

Herbert D. Strauss (1909–1973) was an American advertising executive at the Grey Advertising Agency.

== Biography ==
Strauss was born to a Jewish family on April 21, 1909. In 1931, he graduated with a B.A. in economics from the University of Pennsylvania's Wharton School. In 1932, he joined The next year he joined the Riggs Optical Company, a subsidiary of Bausch & Lomb, in Chicago as advertising manager.

In 1939, he joined the Grey Advertising Agency (founded by Lawrence Valenstein and Arthur C. Fatt) and as an account executive. Grey differentiated itself from its competitors by using a team approach to advertising that closely worked with its customers and conducted extensive marketing research. and focused on developing a brand through pre-selling and building a market for it. In the 1940s, the firm was billing $1 million per year. In 1947, after winning Gruen watch account, billings reached $10 million. In 1955, after winning the Block Drug account, Grey's billings reached $30 million. In 1956, Valenstein became chairman of the board and Fatt became president. In 1957, the firm developed the widely successful "Leaving now for Trenton, Philadelphia and Cucamonga!" campaign for Greyhound Bus with the tagline "Go Greyhound and leave the driving to us." and won the Ford Motor Company, Procter & Gamble and Chock Full o' Nuts accounts. In 1961, billings reached $59 million and Valenstein became chairman of the executive committee; Fatt was named chairman and Strauss its president. As president, Strauss presided over the national and international expansion of the agency. In 1961, the firm opened an office in Los Angeles; and in 1962 the firm opened an office in London and in 1963 in Japan. In 1964, billings reached $100 million. In 1965, the firm went public trading on the Nasdaq exchange and the firm also expanded into the use of psychographics (the analysis of consumer lifestyles). In 1966, Grey became one of the top 10 agencies in the U.S. In 1967, Strauss was named CEO and chairman; and Edward H. Meyer, president. In 1969, Grey won the Kraft General Foods' Post cereal account and sales reached $230 million. In 1969, Strauss was named chairman and in 1970, Meyer was named CEO. In the 1970s, Grey was responsible for several popular ad campaigns including "Star Wars" toys for Kenner, aspirin and toothpaste for SmithKline, and Stove Top Stuffing for Kraft General Foods. In 1973, Strauss died of a heart attack.

Strauss served as a director of the American Association of Advertising Agencies, the National Outdoor Advertising Bureau, and Better Business Bureau of New York.

== Personal life ==
Strauss was married to Sarann Eisner; they had two children, Richard Burnham and Barbara McIntire. Strauss died on March 17, 1973, of a heart attack at his home in St. Thomas, U.S. Virgin Islands.
