= Valenstein =

Valenstein Is a surname. Notable people with the surname include:

- Elliot Valenstein (1923–2023), American psychologist, Historian of Psychiatry
- Lawrence Valenstein (1899–1982), American advertising executive
