= Redox (disambiguation) =

Redox (reduction–oxidation reaction) is a chemical reaction in which the oxidation states of atoms are changed.

Redox may also refer to:

- RedoxOS, an operating system written in the Rust programming language
- Redox Brands, a former company established in Ohio, US
- REDOX, a.k.a. Hexone, an obsolete method of nuclear reprocessing

== See also ==
- Redox titration, a type of titration based on a redox reaction between the analyte and titrant
