= Denorex =

Denorex can refer to:

- a brand of Coal tar
- a brand of dandruff shampoo, originally manufactured by Procter & Gamble alongside Prell
