= DirectBuy =

American home furnishings buying club

- Company type: Private
- Founded: 1971
- Founder: James L. Gagan
- Headquarters: Merrillville, Indiana
- Key people: James L. Gagan, Founder; Justin Yoshimura, Chairman; Joe Picciano, CEO
- Products: Home furnishings, electronics, accessories
- Revenue: ▲US$ 56.4 million (July 2016)
- Owner: CSC Generation
- Number of employees: 340 (Feb. 2017)
- Website: directbuy.com

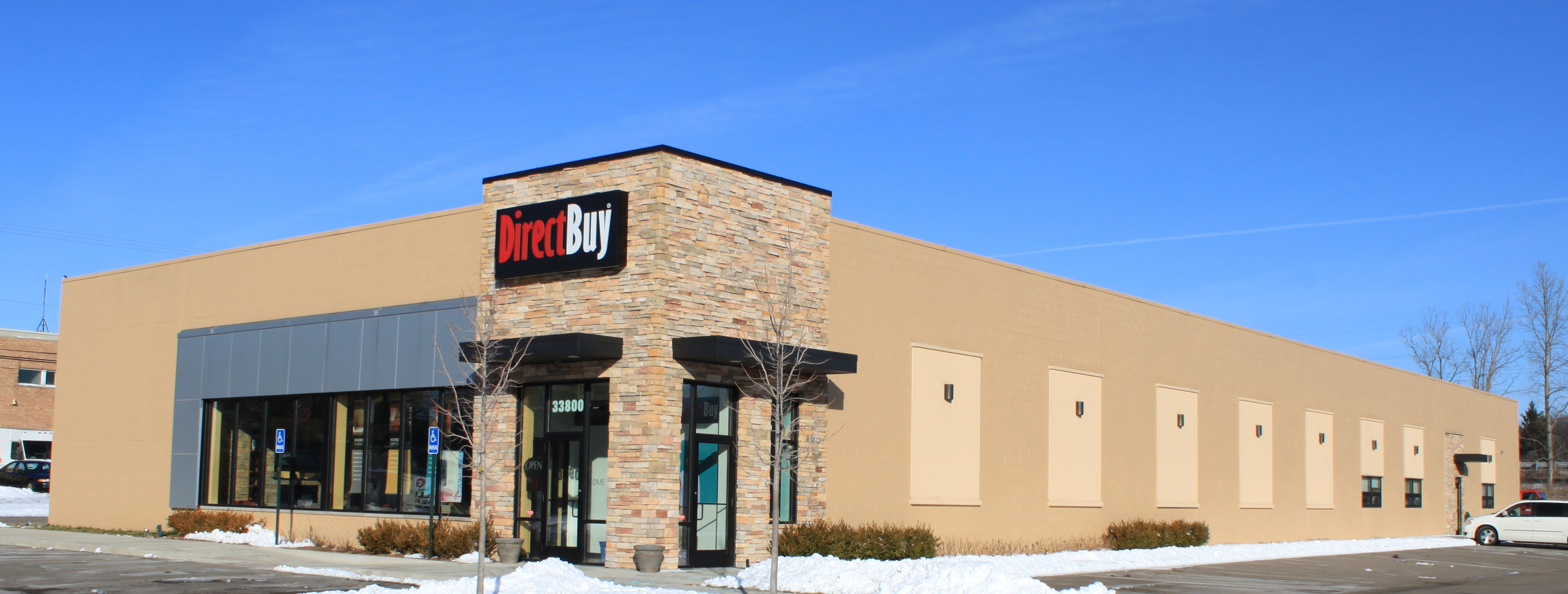
DirectBuy showroom, Farmington, Michigan, 2012.

DirectBuy is an American membership buying service headquartered in Merrillville, Indiana. Members pay a fee, which entitles them to buy products at a discount, directly from the manufacturer and its authorized suppliers. Product categories include home furnishings, home improvement, entertainment, outdoor, flooring, and accessories.

== History ==
=== Early years ===
DirectBuy was founded as United Consumers Club in 1971 in Merrillville, Indiana, by James L. Gagan. It grew substantially over the years, as it franchised; at its height, the buying club had over a million members, with a peak of 167 showroom locations across North America. The first Canadian franchise was founded in 1996. The company changed its name to DirectBuy in 2004.

DirectBuy was ranked No. 4 in the Entrepreneur 2007 Franchise 500 in "Miscellaneous Services."

=== New ownership, bankruptcy filing and reorganization ===
United Consumers Club remained the holding company for DirectBuy until December 19, 2007, when DirectBuy was acquired for $550 million by private equity firm Trivest, and Allied Capital Corporation, with $83 million to support the buyout.

On November 1, 2016, with approximately $185 million in debt, DirectBuy filed for Chapter 11 bankruptcy. By then, the company had closed all 160 of its franchised showrooms, and had shifted from its store-based model to a focus on e-commerce. In February 2017, Austin, Texas-based private equity firm CSC Generation, an affiliate of Chinese private equity firm China Science and Merchants Capital Management, acquired DirectBuy in a bankruptcy deal.

In January 2018, DirectBuy acquired the Sears Canada parts and warranty business, creating a new warranty membership for DirectBuy members who hold extended warranties from Sears and had been left without coverage on their appliances when Sears went out of business. Also in January 2018, after having closed all but six of its showrooms, DirectBuy began opening new scaled-down brick-and-mortar clubs, with the first opened in Houston, Texas, and plans to open around 24 in the next two years. The Texas location would later close, and none of the 24 stores would be opened due to low sales. That month, the company announced that it is looking to acquire small furniture stores in cities where it has members. On October 16, 2023, DirectBuy filed for bankruptcy for the second time in seven years.

== Membership terms ==
Starting in 2016, DirectBuy began to shift from its store-based model to a focus on e-commerce. Also in 2016, the company expanded beyond home products into electronics, sporting goods, and travel. As of February 2017, DirectBuy has approximately 200,000 members in the US. As of January 2018, the annual membership rates have been reduced to about $1,000 for the first year and $300 per year after that, although the company must be contacted to provide the exact rates.

Prior to 2016, membership costs varied by franchise location, typically costing between $4,000 and $7,000 for a standard three-year membership and then around $200 per year for ensuing years. Customers were pressured to decide at the time of the open house visit, before leaving the showroom, whether to join DirectBuy after receiving a presentation of services in which they could purchase home furnishings and other household items "at the same prices that the retailers pay." In return for paying the membership fee, members were able to purchase home furnishing items directly from manufacturers or authorized suppliers. In 2013, the company launched a new website, added trial memberships, and began touting a more transparent, customer-friendly style. It also began offering travel deals, launching DirectBuy Travel in 2014.

A 2007 review by Consumer Reports stated, "the lack of price transparency makes it hard to evaluate whether you'll save by joining DirectBuy. But even if you were to save 25 percent on purchases after joining, you'd need to spend more than $20,000 just to recoup your membership fee. DirectBuy might save you money if you're furnishing a house from scratch or doing a major renovation" but "since you can't shop around beforehand, you'll be joining blind." Consumer Reports also found that prices for items such as electronics were, in some instances, higher than available from online retailers; the "deep discounts" were found on flooring and high-end furniture. Despite the high fees, DirectBuy reported that 75% of its customers renewed their memberships in 2009.

== Legal issues ==
=== Lawsuit ===
West Virginia Attorney General Darrell McGraw filed suit January 26, 2011, in Kanawha County Circuit Court against DirectBuy Inc., its local franchise and the company's president alleging it engages in unlawful, coercive, deceptive, and high-pressure sales practices. The suit also alleged that DirectBuy pressures consumers with its "now or never" tactic, that anyone who leaves the premises without joining the club will be banned from joining forever. This threat is false, misleading, and unconscionable according to the Attorney General.

=== Cease and desist letter ===
Attorneys for DirectBuy issued a cease and desist letter to consumer blog infomercialscams.com for "unwarranted and defamatory attacks" posted about DirectBuy by visitors to the blog and asked that the comments be immediately removed. Though the DirectBuy attorney forbade the letter to be posted online, citing ownership of the copyright to the letter as justification, Public Citizen posted the letter on its website along with a response.
