= Herbert Strauss =

Herbert Strauss may refer to:

- Herbert A. Strauss (1918–2005), German-American historian
- Herbert D. Strauss (1909–1973), American businessman
- Herbert L. Strauss (1936–2014), German-American chemist
