= ChemPro =

American consumer goods company

ChemPro, Inc.
- Industry: Consumer goods
- Founded: 1990; 36 years ago
- Defunct: 2006
- Fate: Merge
- Successor: CR Brands
- Headquarters: Spartanburg, South Carolina, U.S.
- Products: Cleaning products
- Number of employees: 75

ChemPro, Inc. was a consumers goods company based in Spartanburg, South Carolina. The corporation made branded and private label heavy-duty household cleaning products sold through dollar store, mass and grocery channels.

== History ==
ChemPro was founded in 1990 by Clayton Jones. Clayton Jones invented Mean Green Super Strength Cleaner and Degreaser which is marked internationally. Allied Capital acquired ChemPro in March 2006 for 99.2 million dollars. Allied then merged Redox Brands and ChemPro, Inc., with the resulting company being renamed CR Brands.

== Brands ==
- Mean Green
- Pine Power
- Magnum Power

== See also ==
- Redox Brands
- CR Brands
