= Jerome I. Elkind =

American electrical engineer and computer scientist

- Other name: Jerry Elkind
- Known for: Computer science
- Spouse: Linda Valenstein

Academic background
- Education: Massachusetts Institute of Technology
- Influences: J. C. R. Licklider

Jerome Elkind is an American electrical engineer and computer scientist. In 1988 he was co-founder of the Lexia Institute.

== Biography ==
Elkind was educated at the Massachusetts Institute of Technology, earning his undergraduate degree in 1951 and Sc.D. in 1957. He went on to join BBN Technologies and participated for them in the 1960 Symposium on Principles of Self-Organization. He then was appointed head of the Computer Science Laboratory at Xerox's Palo Alto Research Center (1971-8). Here he held budgetary responsibility for new projects. He also worked with Bob Taylor on the Xerox Alto. He went on to become Vice President of Systems Integration at Xerox.

== Personal life ==
In 1959, he married engineer Linda Starr Valenstein, daughter of advertising executive Lawrence Valenstein in a Jewish ceremony in Scarsdale.
