= Summer's Eve =

American feminine hygiene brand

- Product type: Feminine hygiene
- Current owner: Prestige Consumer Healthcare
- Produced by: C.B. Fleet Company
- Country: United States
- Introduced: 1972; 54 years ago
- Markets: United States; Canada; Australia; and other international markets
- Website: summerseve.com

Summer's Eve is an American brand of feminine hygiene products that is produced by the C.B. Fleet Company, a subsidiary of Prestige Consumer Healthcare.

== Controversial ads ==
A Summer's Eve ad in the August 2010 issue of Woman's Day featured eight steps a woman should take before asking for a raise, the first being to use their product to douche. The New York Times questioned the ad, resulting in the company apologizing for it and stating they would not run it again.

A 2011 TV ad featured different-colored hands mimicking talking vaginas, and was titled "Hail to the V". Comedian Stephen Colbert parodied the ads on The Colbert Report by advertising products that target men's "deeply troubling genitals", called Autumnal Afternoon Pine Fresh Dick Scrub and Cucumber Ball Dip. Colbert used his index finger pointing up to mimic a talking penis and even mocked the Summer's Eve slogan by ending the ad with "Hail to the D".

== In the news ==
Publicist Ronn Torossian sued rival Drew Kerr for $20 million claiming he set up a bogus website for him, linking him to a picture of a Summer's Eve douche.
