= Lawrence Valenstein =

American advertising executive

- Born: Lawrence Valenstein; 1899
- Died: September 9, 1982 (age 83)
- Occupation: Advertising executive
- Spouse: Alice Starr
- Children: John Valenstein; Linda Valenstein Elkind

Lawrence Valenstein (1899–1982) was an American advertising executive who founded the Grey Advertising Agency.

== Biography ==
Valenstein was born in 1899. On August 1, 1917, at the age of 18, Valenstein borrowed $100 and started his own company located at 309 Fifth Avenue in Manhattan. He named the company the Grey Agency because the walls of the office were grey. The company's original focus was to publish direct mailings for the furrier industry which morphed into a magazine named Furs and Fashions. In 1925, the firm, renamed the Grey Advertising Agency, became a full-fledged advertising agency and differentiated itself from its competitors by using a team approach to advertising that closely worked with its customers and conducted extensive marketing research. Valenstein focused on developing a brand through pre-selling and building a market for it. In the 1930s the firm focused on soft goods. In the 1940s, the firm was billing $1 million per year. In 1947, after winning Gruen watch account, billings reached $10 million. In 1955, after winning the Block Drug account, Grey's billings reached $30 million. In 1956, Valenstein became chairman of the board and Arthur C. Fatt (hired in 1921 at the age of seventeen) became president. In 1957, Grey developed the "Leaving now for Trenton, Philadelphia and Cucamonga!" campaign for Greyhound Bus with the tagline "Go Greyhound and leave the driving to us."

In 1961, billings reached $59 million and Valenstein became chairman of the executive committee; Fatt was named chairman and Herbert D. Strauss its president. In 1961, the firm expanded by opening an office in Los Angeles; and he expanded internationally by opening offices in London in 1962 and Japan in 1963. In 1964, billings reached $100 million. In 1965, the firm went public trading on the Nasdaq exchange and the firm also expanded into the use of psychographics (the analysis of consumer lifestyles). In 1965, Valenstein retired and was named founder/chairman.

== Personal life ==
Valenstein was married to Alice Starr; they had two children: John Valenstein; and Linda Valenstein Elkind. In 1959, his daughter married engineer Jerome I. Elkind in a Jewish ceremony in Scarsdale. In 1971, his son married Karen Wishnew who was one of the first women to become an investment banker.
