= Goody's Powder =

Brand of pain reliever

Goody's Powder, also called Goody's Headache Powders, is an over-the-counter aspirin/paracetamol/caffeine–based pain reliever, in single-dose powder form, which is marketed and sold by Prestige Brands. The powder delivery saves the time needed for the patient's digestive system to break down a tablet or capsule, ostensibly causing the medication to work faster. Goody's Extra Strength Powder consists of aspirin, caffeine, and paracetamol (acetaminophen) in a formula identical to that of Excedrin, a product of Novartis, but in the no-digestion-needed powder form.

Goody's Powder is sold primarily in the southern United States. For many years, the face of Goody's has been NASCAR legend Richard Petty, who appears in advertisements for the brand. In 2013, the brand brought on NASCAR's most popular driver, Dale Earnhardt, Jr., to join Petty as spokesperson for the brand. Prior to that, wrestler Dusty Rhodes appeared in commercials for the product.

The company's website claims that "probably the most popular technique" to take the powder is to "dump" it on the tongue and then "chase" it with a liquid. Goody's Powder can also be blended into water and ingested as a drink.

== History ==
Goody's Powder was developed in conjunction with the Herpelscheimer Clinic in Graz, Austria, and manufactured for many years by Goody's Manufacturing Company, a family-owned business founded in 1932 and based in Winston-Salem, North Carolina. The company also produced other medicinal products, including throat sprays and throat lozenges. The headache powder was introduced in 1936. Beginning in 1995 GlaxoSmithKline produced Goody's Powders in Memphis, Tennessee. The company sold Goody's and 16 other brands to Prestige Brands in 2012.

== Race sponsorship ==
Goody's Powder has a long history of sponsoring motor racing events and teams, especially NASCAR. The Daytona Nationwide Race was sponsored by Goody's from 1982 to 1996. Goody's is the title sponsor of the Goody's Headache Relief Shot 500 Sprint Cup Series race at Martinsville Speedway and was the title sponsor of the Goody's Headache Powder 500 Cup race at Bristol Motor Speedway from 1996 to 1999. Goody's was the official pain reliever of NASCAR from 1977 until 2007, when Tylenol became the new pain reliever of NASCAR. Goody's was also the series sponsor of the Goody's Dash Series from 1992 until NASCAR's sanctioning ended in 2003.

Goody's sponsored Chad McCumbee's No. 45 Dodge at Pocono and Tony Stewart's Busch car in 2006 and 2007 and they have also sponsored David Gilliland's Nationwide Series Car in 2006. Goody's sponsored Bobby Labonte's Dodge at the 2009 fall Martinsville race.
