= 3-in-One Oil =

General-purpose lubricating oil

- Type: Lubricating oil
- Inventor: George W. Cole
- Inception: 1894
- Manufacturer: WD-40 Company
- Website: 3inone.com

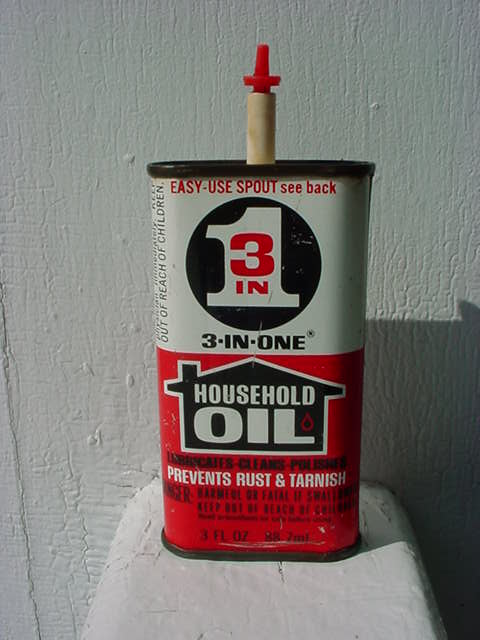
3-In-One lubricating oil

3-in-One Oil is a general-purpose lubricating oil sold for household and do-it-yourself use. It was originally formulated in 1894 for use on bicycles, and remains a popular lubricant for their chains. Its name, given by inventor George W. Cole of New Jersey in 1894, reflects the product's triple ability to "clean, lubricate and protect".

The product changed ownership many times throughout the 20th century and was bought by its current owners, the WD-40 Company, in 1995. The current marketing slogan is "The Tool Kit In A Can," with the logo of the text "3 in" inside a large numeral "1".

A few other products are now produced under the 3-in-1 brand, including a white lithium grease, silicone spray, and oil with added PTFE.

In 2000, the can was redesigned to look like the early 20th century oil can design, with a hemisphere base and tapered straight spout.

An advertisement in The Church Standard magazine (April 13, 1901, p 867) offers 3 in 1 Oil as a perfect polish for pianos. It claimed that the oil was "long lasting" and did not come off on the clothes. An advertisement in Good Housekeeping (March 1930) suggests using 3 in 1 Oil as a furniture polish, by wringing out a water-soaked cloth and putting 3 in 1 Oil on it, wiping the dirt off the surface with the oiled cloth, then polishing the surface clean with a dry soft cloth.
