= CRC Industries =

Manufacturer of industrial chemicals

- Founded: 1958
- Parent: Berwind Corporation

CRC Industries is a manufacturer and distributor of industrial chemicals for maintenance and repair of marine, electrical, industrial, automotive and aviation equipment.

== History ==
It was founded in 1958 after a verbal agreement between Rocket Chemical, the predecessor of the WD-40 Company, and Charles J. Webb II to distribute WD-40 fell apart. Webb then set up a competitor company in Philadelphia, Corrosion Reaction Consultants, Inc., and hired away Rocket president Norman Larsen to lead it. In 1960 it consisted of Larsen, two chemists and five staff. Its first product was CRC Corrosion Inhibitor, also called 5–56, a product comparable to WD-40. The product was reformulated in 1963 as the company diversified to make more specialized products.

The company has been owned by Berwind Corporation since 1981.

== Products ==
CRC's first product, 5-56, is still sold. However, 6-56, a silicone-based replacement, is CRC's current competing product for WD-40.

Brakleen, a tetrachloroethylene (PERC)-based brake cleaner, is one of CRC's signature products. It has gained a cult following due to its dissolving power and has been used off-label for many other purposes, a practice strongly discouraged by health experts and the product's own warning labels. As PERC is illegal in New Jersey and California, a safer but weaker substitute chlorine-free formula mostly made of acetone and heptane is also offered.

== Facilities ==
CRC's manufacturing is headquartered in Warminster, Pennsylvania with the corporate office in Horsham, Pennsylvania. It markets products through subsidiaries in the United States, Australia, Germany, Belgium, United Kingdom, China and New Zealand.

Their facilities in Warminster include a private railroad spur, served by the New Hope Railroad. Traffic on the spur constitutes a sizable portion of the railroad's freight traffic; CRC Industries is their largest freight customer.
