= Oil can =

Can holding oil for lubricating machines

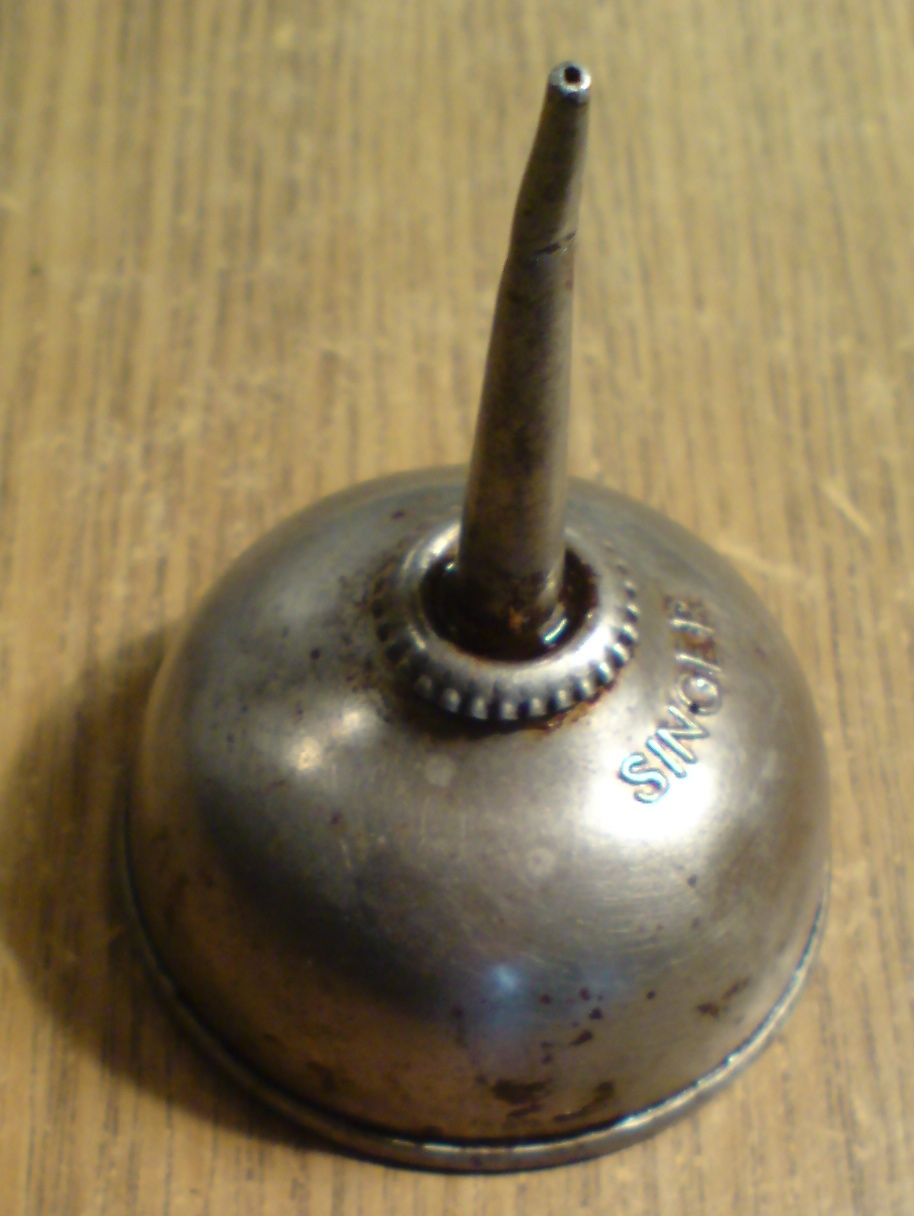
An oil can for a Singer sewing machine

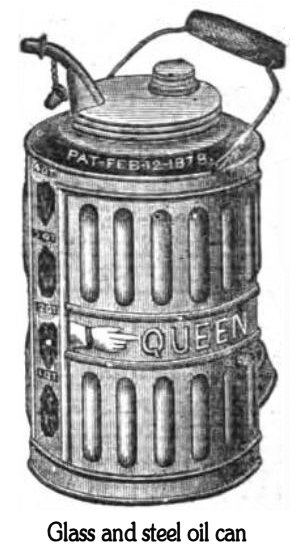
Oil can used to store household lamp oil (1882). Windows in the tin allow to observe the level. Cap for the spout on a chain.

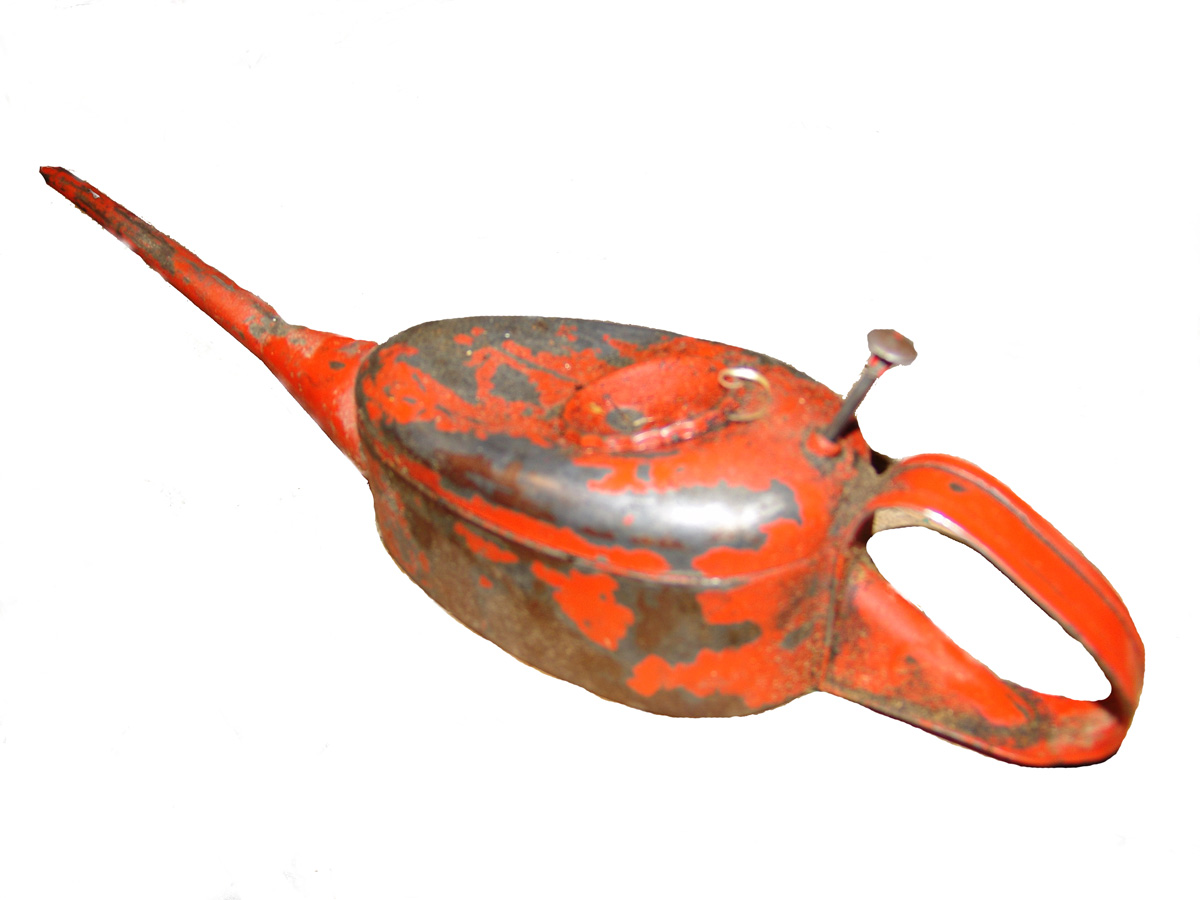
Soldered Oil can with a push-button pump, indented at the top with the screw cap.

An oil can (oilcan or oiler) is a can that holds oil (usually motor oil) for lubricating machines. An oil can can also be used to fill oil-based lanterns. A worker, referred to as an oiler, can use an oil can (among other tools) to lubricate machinery.

Oil cans were made by companies like Noera Manufacturing Company and Perfection in the late 19th and early 20th centuries. Around this time, oil cans frequently leaked and contributed to fires. In 1957, aluminium oil cans were introduced, produced by companies like the American Can Company.

Rocanville, Saskatchewan, Canada is home to a large-scale oil can industry because of the Symons Oiler factory which produced oil cans during World War II.

== Design ==
Oil cans come in a variety of designs, from a simple cylindrical disposable can opened with a churchkey (or with a combined spout-opener), to a hemisphere base and tapered straight spout to more intricate designs with handles and push-buttons, to the modern plastic bottle. In 2000, the 3-In-One Oil can was redesigned to look like the early 20th century design (hemisphere base with tapered straight spout).

== See also ==
- Aladdin
- Can collecting
- Oil Can delay, an audio effect
- Oil-canning:
  - a wavy surface condition on roll-formed metal sheets
  - a metalforming drawing process
