= Go Greyhound and Leave the Driving to Us =

Go Greyhound and Leave the Driving to Us is the advertising slogan used by Greyhound Lines, Inc. starting in 1956. The tag line appears on the bus line's advertising- television commercials, billboards, magazine ads, and radio spots periodically for the next four decades. The slogan implies that by riding a Greyhound bus, one avoids the hassles of driving a car. It makes car travel seem less convenient than bus travel. The message confronts Greyhound travelers who own cars and have a choice (the target market for the commercials), and those who do not. Because of the success of this advertising slogan, Greyhound continually returned to it many times in the years after it was introduced.

== Target market ==
The fact that Greyhound appealed to beatniks was actually a sign that the company needed to work on its marketing in the 1950s. The beatnik, bohemian, and "romantic-rebel" market was not a very lucrative one, and Greyhound executives realized that they needed to make an appeal to the middle class, who had more money. Ogilvy and Mather, the advertising firm, and Grey Advertising were contacted by the company and tasked with creating an effective slogan that would attract middle-class viewers. These transitional riders, as they were termed, made up a majority of Greyhound passengers, and were usually women with children, grandparents, college students, members of the military, and workers traveling to their jobs. Eventually, Grey Advertising created the famous slogan, created an account with Greyhound.

== Competition ==
Greyhound's primary competition came from other forms of transportation rather than from other bus lines—especially since the 1980s, when it bought out the largest member of its last remaining rival, the Trailways consortium. Prior to the 1950s, train companies were the biggest threat to Greyhound, but afterward airplanes would increasingly undercut the company with low-fare offers. Cars were also a continual source of competition. In response, Greyhound commercials aimed to promote the ease of their services compared to car driving.

== Marketing strategy ==
The "Go Greyhound and Leave the Driving to Us" slogan became Greyhound's chief advertising for decades. But, in the 1980s, the business itself went through a slump, as did their promotional efforts. From 1982 to 1990, Greyhound ran few television commercials. When they resumed airing commercials, new advertising slogans were used, leaving out the classic "Leave the Driving to Us" line. Over the years, Greyhound has actually removed and revived their popular slogan. In 1988, it was used in ads targeting Hispanic riders, and in 1993 it proclaimed "I go simple, I go easy, I go Greyhound." Since 2000, some Greyhound buses have carried the slogan "Proud to Serve America. Go Greyhound, and leave the Driving to Us".
