= WD-40 Company =

American manufacturer of household products

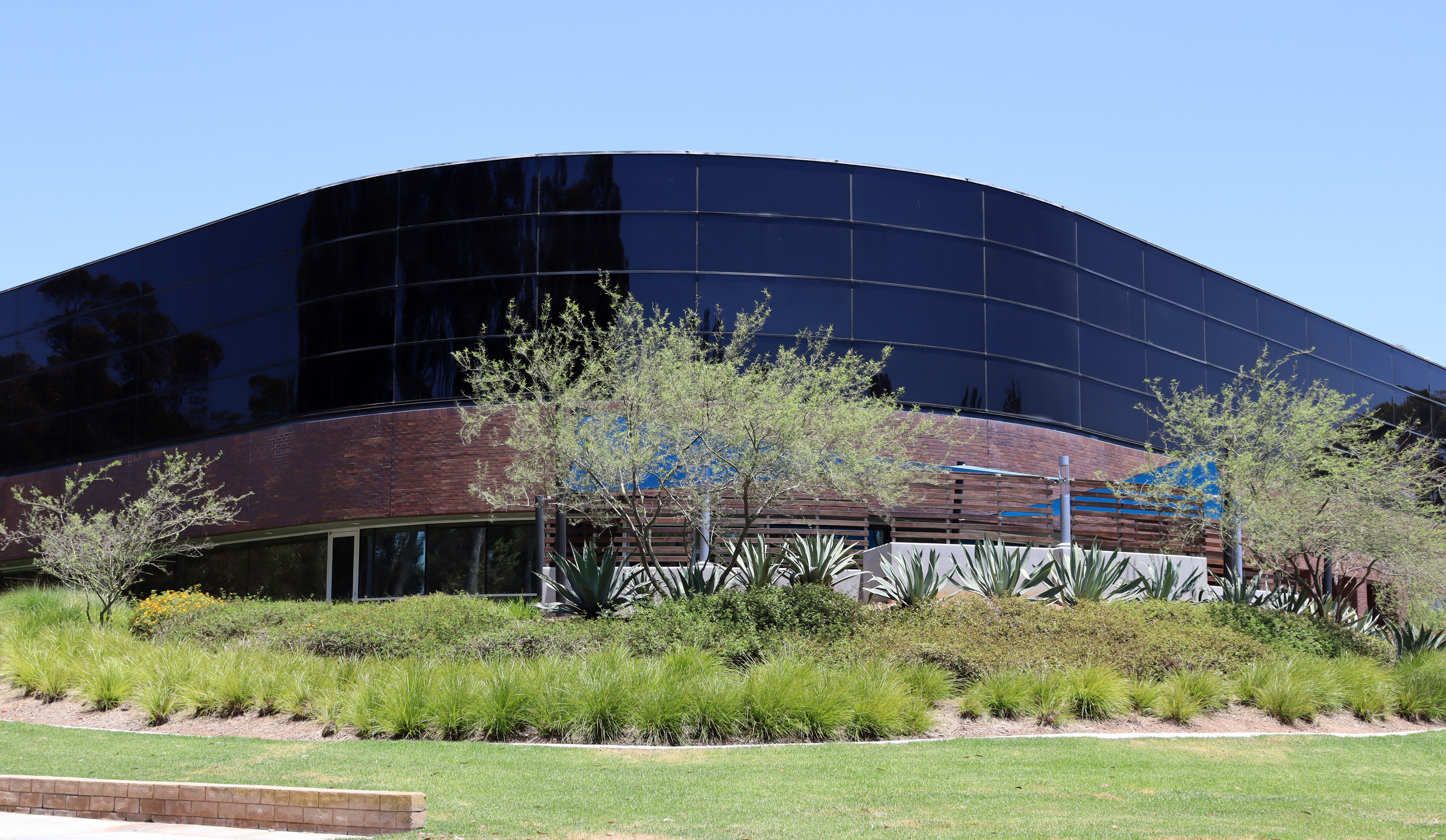
- WD-40 Company headquarters in San Diego, California
- Type: Public
- Traded as: Nasdaq: WDFC; S&P 600 component
- Industry: Chemical
- Founded: September 23, 1953; 73 years ago (as Rocket Chemical Company)
- Headquarters: San Diego, California, U.S.
- Key people: Steve Brass (CEO)
- Products: WD-40, 3-In-One Oil, Lava, Spot Shot, X-14, Carpet Fresh, and 2000 Flushes
- Revenue: ▲US$620.0 million (2025)
- Operating income: ▲US$103.8 million (2025)
- Net income: ▲US$91.0 million (2025)
- Total assets: ▲US$475.8 million (2025)
- Total equity: ▲US$268.2 million (2025)
- Website: www.wd40company.com

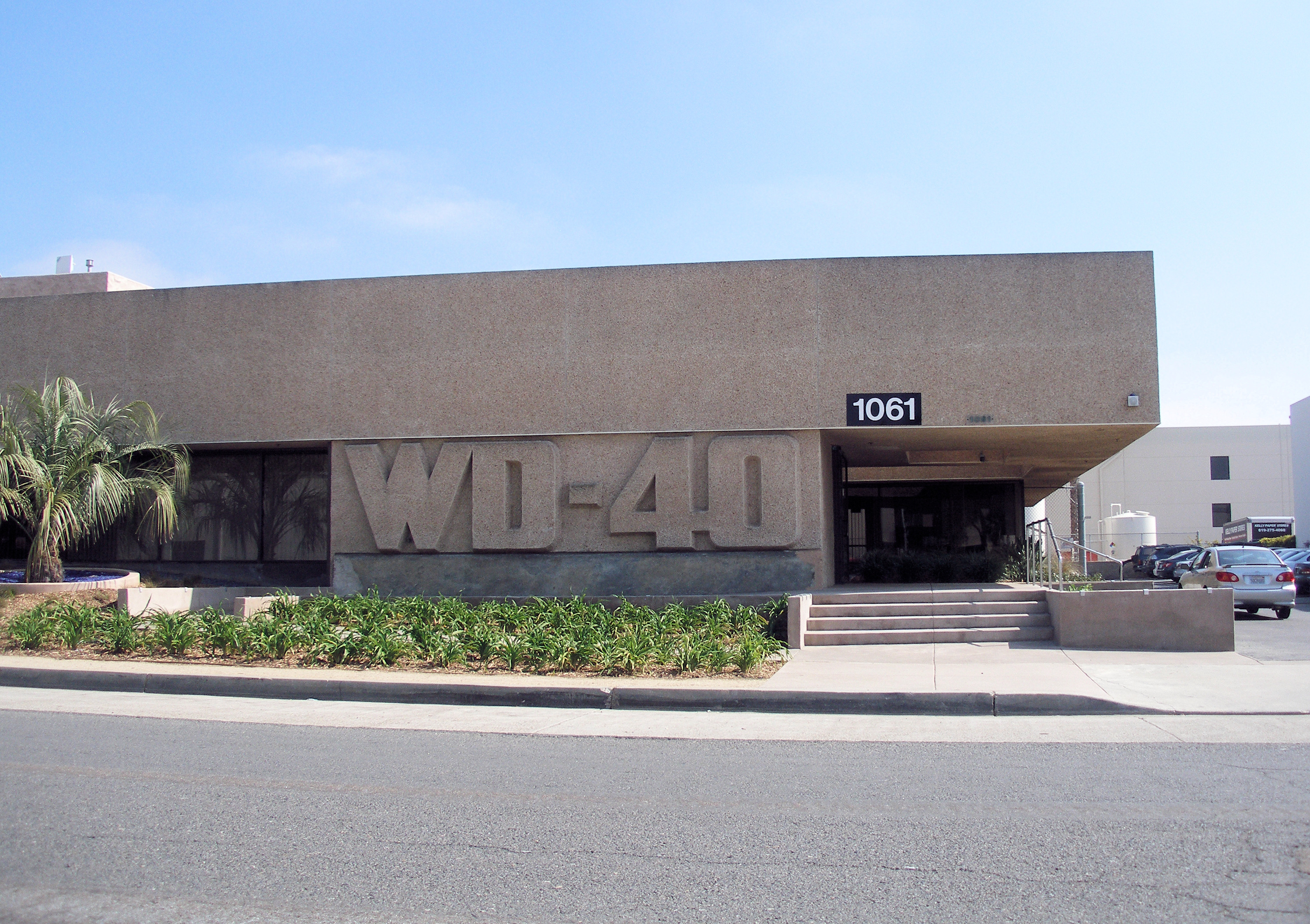
Former WD-40 headquarters in San Diego

The WD-40 Company, originally the Rocket Chemical Company, is an American manufacturer of household and multi-use products, including its signature brand, WD-40, as well as 3-In-One Oil, Lava, Spot Shot, X-14, Carpet Fresh, GT85, 1001, Solvol, 2000 Flushes and No Vac. It is based in San Diego, California.

As of April 2018, the company marketed its products in more than 176 countries.

== History ==
WD-40 Company was founded as Rocket Chemical Company in September 1953 by Cyril E. Irving, Norman Roulette and his son Robert Roulette, and Iver Norman Lawson. Reginald S. Fleet is also claimed to be a founding member by his alma mater, Georgia Institute of Technology. The company had offices in Chula Vista and National City before moving to Kearny Villa Road in Kearny Mesa in 1955. Sam Crivello, who owned a tuna seiner, a major industry in San Diego at that time, was an early investor and became a director in 1958. Norman B. Larsen was president of Rocket in 1957 and 1958, and he had the idea of packaging WD-40 in aerosol cans and selling it into the consumer market. Larsen left the company in 1958 after a verbal agreement between Rocket and a distributor fell apart; the distributor set up CRC Industries to directly compete with Rocket and Larsen left to lead it. Cy Irving took over as president in 1958 and retired in 1969.

In 1969, John S. Barry, on becoming President and CEO, changed the name to WD-40 Company after what was then its only product. Barry, who died July 3, 2009, reportedly made the name change on the basis that the Rocket Chemical Company did not make rockets. The company went public in 1973 on the then-newly established National Association of Securities Dealers Automated Quotations (NASDAQ) stock exchange. Its stock symbol is "WDFC".

Gerald C. Schleif became president in 1990 and CEO in 1992; he had joined the company in 1969. Schleif led the company until he retired in 1997, after which Garry O. Ridge took over. By the fiscal year 2017, gross revenue for the company totaled $381 million in annual revenue; about half of this was for sales outside the US. CEO Ridge told a NASDAQ publication that they manufacture the "secret formula" in four plants located in various countries and ship it to other companies which then blend and package the product before shipping it to customers.

== Products ==
WD-40 stands for ″Water Displacement, 40th formula". In addition to its flagship WD-40 product, the WD-40 Company has acquired several household-products companies, adding such brand names as 3-In-One Oil, Lava, Spot Shot, X-14, Carpet Fresh, and 2000 Flushes to its roster.
