= Grey Global Group =

American advertising and marketing agency

Grey Group
- Company type: Subsidiary
- Industry: Advertising, marketing
- Founded: 1917; 109 years ago (as Grey Studios)
- Founders: Lawrence Valenstein; Arthur C. Fatt
- Headquarters: 200 Fifth Avenue; New York City, New York, U.S.
- Area served: Worldwide
- Key people: James R. Heekin III (executive chairman)
- Services: Brand management, marketing strategy, creative development, direct marketing, public relations, public affairs, digital marketing, production
- Revenue: 1.307 billion USD (2003)
- Number of employees: 2,400
- Parent: WPP plc
- Subsidiaries: Grey; G2; GHG; GCI Group; MediaCom Worldwide; Alliance; G WHIZ; WING; Grey EMEA; ArcTouch
- Website: www.grey.com

Grey Group is a global advertising and marketing agency with headquarters in New York City, and 432 offices in 96 countries, operating in 154 cities. It is organized into geographical units: North America; Europe, Middle East and Africa, Asia-Pacific, and Latin America.

It is a unit of communications conglomerate WPP Group.

== History ==
Founded in 1917 by Lawrence Valenstein and Arthur C. Fatt, Grey Global Group began as a direct marketing company named Grey Studios, reflecting the color of the wall of its original quarters, changing to Grey Advertising in 1925.

In 1956, Grey acquired its first major client, Procter & Gamble. In 1961, billings reached $59 million and in the same year, Herbert D. Strauss was named president and the firm expanded domestically and internationally. In 1961, the firm opened an office in Los Angeles, and in 1962 the firm opened an office in London and in 1963 in Japan. In 1964, billings reached $100 million.

In 1965, the firm went public, trading on the Nasdaq exchange, and the firm expanded into the use of psychographics (the analysis of consumer lifestyles). In 1966, Grey became one of the top 10 agencies in the U.S.

In 1967, Strauss was named chief executive officer and chairman, and Edward H. Meyer was named president. In 1969, Strauss was named chairman In 1970, Meyer was named chief executive officer.

In the 1970s, Grey was responsible for several popular ad campaigns including Star Wars toys for Kenner, aspirin and toothpaste for SmithKline, and Stove Top Stuffing for Kraft General Foods.

In 1973, Strauss died of a heart attack.

Through the 1960s and 1970s, Grey continued to acquire major accounts, and grew into related communication fields. In 1970, Meyer became chief executive officer and would remain in that position for 36 years.

In 2000, Grey Advertising became Grey Global Group.

In late 2005, James R. Heekin III became chief executive officer of Grey Worldwide, Grey Global Group's traditional advertising agency. On January 1, 2007, he became chairman and chief executive officer of Grey Group, the renamed agency holding company.

Grey San Francisco is the company's San Francisco-based West Coast headquarters. Its clients include Symantec, LendingTree, Pernod Ricard, and SunEdison.

In 2016, Grey acquired ArcTouch, a mobile design and development studio, which it operates as a subsidiary.

In March 2017, Grey's London office announced its rebranding as Valenstein & Fatt for 100 days, to celebrate its Jewish founders and later executives, and to highlight prejudice in society.

In August 2017, Grey Group appointed Michael Houston as worldwide chief executive officer on its 100th anniversary.

In November 2020, WPP Group merged Grey Group and AKQA together to create AKQA Group.

In July 2022, Grey Group named Laura Maness the agency's global CEO, who previously worked at Havas. She is the sixth CEO in Grey history and the first woman to attain the role.

== Notable work ==
=== Leave the Driving to Us (Greyhound) ===
In 1956, Grey co-founder Arthur C. Fatt wrote the longstanding Greyhound Lines catchphrase "Leave the driving to us."

=== Villarriba and Villabajo ===
In 1991, Grey Spain conceived for Procter & Gamble an advertising campaign for its Fairy dishwashing liquid for the Spanish market focused on a television commercial in which two fictional towns, Villarriba and Villabajo, compete for the best paella at their popular fiestas. The commercial was soon dubbed into other languages and used in markets such as the United Kingdom, Germany, Russia, Portugal and Greece, modifying the detergent bottle with the corresponding local one. The advertising campaign has been renewed many times over the years, it was expanded to other products of the brand and it has even had local versions in other countries. In 2016, Procter & Gamble –which is one of the largest advertisers in Spain– chose Villarriba and Villabajo as their best advertising campaign ever in the country given its popularity and excellent brand positioning results.

=== Let the Issues Be the Issue ===
During the final weeks of the 2008 United States presidential election, the firm debuted a self-funded political ad depicting candidates Barack Obama and John McCain with inverted skin tones and the text "LET THE ISSUES BE THE ISSUE." The campaign was rolled-out both digitally and via newspaper ads and posters hung around New York City. According to creative director Tor Myhren, it was "a non-partisan image. We wanted to address the race issue straight on. And it cuts both ways; if you're hopping on either candidate's bandwagon solely due to the color of their skin, you're voting for the wrong reasons."

=== Time Sculpture ===
In November 2008, the firm began working with Toshiba to advertise its high-definition television upscaling technology. Its first ad, Time Sculpture, was a British television and cinema advertisement which comprised a collection of interacting movement loops sequenced into a single shot.

== Controversy ==
In 2016, Grey for Good, Grey Group's philanthropic communications division, created a hoax app that claimed to use crowdsourcing to help the refugee crisis in the Mediterranean Sea. After it was debunked by developers, the Apple Store pulled the app on the same day it was awarded a Bronze Lion at the Cannes Lions festival.
