= Ballistol =

Mineral oil based chemical

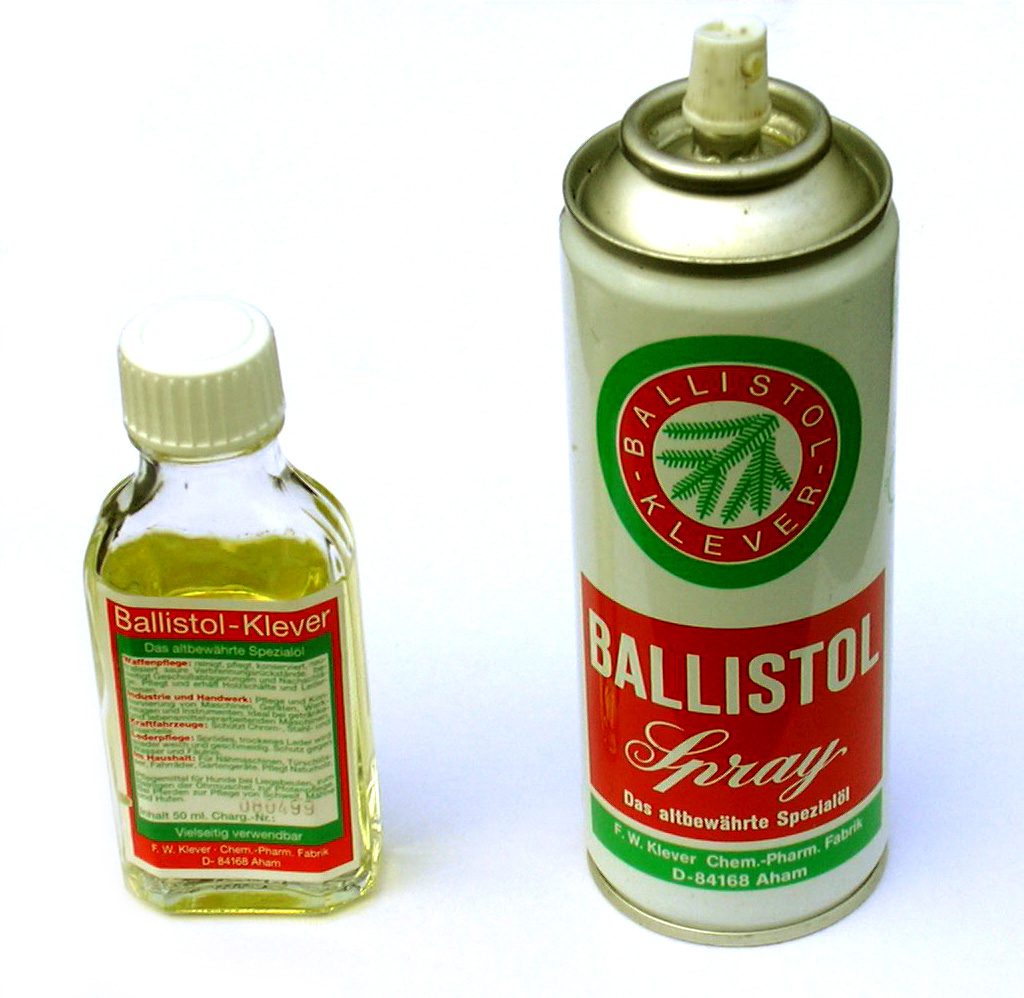
Ballistol as liquid and as aerosol

Ballistol (meaning 'Ballistic Oil') is a mineral oil-based chemical which advertises that it has many uses. It is manufactured and distributed by Ballistol GmbH in the Bavarian village of Aham and was originally intended for cleaning, lubricating, and protecting firearms.

== Description ==
The product originated from the German Empire in 1904, before World War I, after the Imperial German Army requested an 'all-around' oil and cleaner for their Gewehr 98 rifles and equipment. The German military used it from 1905 to 1945.

The chemical is a yellowish clear liquid with a consistency expected of a light oil. However, when it comes in contact with water it emulsifies, becoming a thick creamy white substance. It has a sweet and mildly pungent smell similar to black licorice.

It is distributed in liquid and aerosol forms. The aerosol uses butane or propane as a propellant.

It advertises it has no carcinogens.

== Metal compatibility ==
Ballistol is fully compatible with all metals including aluminium. However, Ballistol dissolves traces of copper, zinc, lead and tombac and can, therefore, be used to clean brass, bronze and silver.

== Ingredients ==
According to a specification from December 2002:

- pharmaceutical white oil: CAS RN 8042-47-5
- Oleic acid: CAS RN 112-80-1
- C-5 alcohols: CAS RN 78-83-1; CAS RN 137-32-6; CAS RN 100-51-6
- different essential oils to perfume Ballistol

According to 2013 MSDS:

- Mineral oil (liquid paraffin)
- Potassium oleate (salt of oleic acid)
- Ammonium oleate
- Benzyl alcohol
- Amyl alcohol
- Isobutyl alcohol
- Benzyl acetate
- Anethole
- Isohexane (aerosol only)

== See also ==
- WD-40
