= Beano (dietary supplement) =

Enzyme-based dietary supplement that is used to reduce gas in the digestive tract

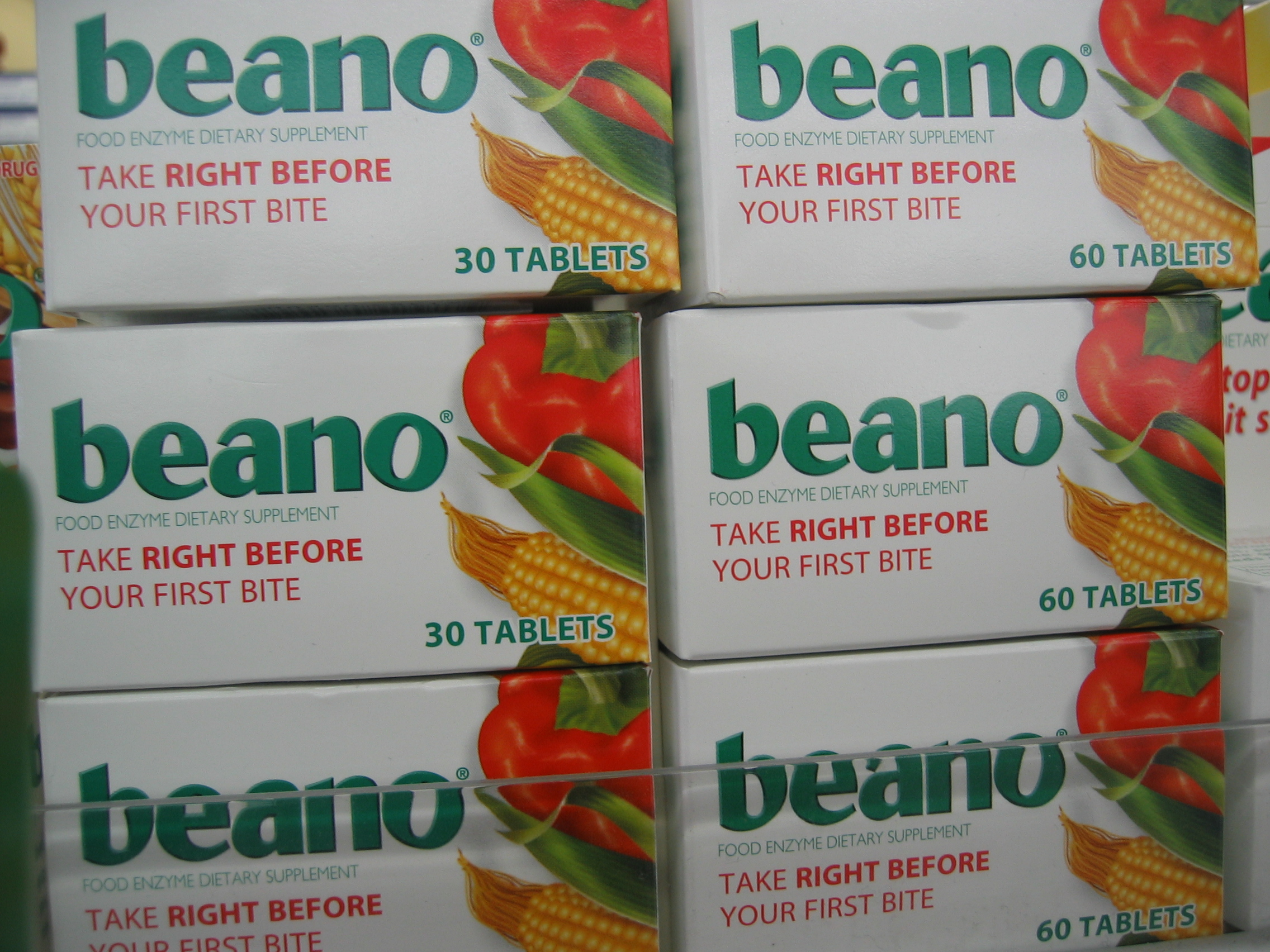
Beano over-the-counter dietary supplement, packaged in boxes

Beano is an enzyme-based dietary supplement that is used to reduce gas in the digestive tract, thereby improving digestion and reducing bloating, discomfort, and flatulence caused by gas. It contains the enzyme alpha-galactosidase (α-GAL). It was introduced as a liquid, but that has been discontinued and it is now available only as tablets and strawberry-flavored "Meltaways".

Beano is marketed and distributed by Prestige Consumer Healthcare, Inc.

== Mechanism of action ==
Beano contains the enzyme α-Galactosidase, specifically one derived from the fungus Aspergillus niger. The enzyme works in the digestive tract to break down the complex or branching sugars (polysaccharides and oligosaccharides) in foods such as legumes (beans and peanuts) and cruciferous vegetables (cauliflower, broccoli, cabbage, and brussels sprouts, among others). The enzyme breaks those complex sugars into simple sugars, making these foods somewhat more digestible. The polysaccharides and oligosaccharides found in these foods might otherwise pass through the small intestine unaffected. Once in the large intestine, those sugars may be metabolized by intestinal flora, fermenting to produce the gases that cause discomfort and flatulence.

Two randomized controlled trials show reduction in gas by subjects taking oral α-GAL. Another study indicates it may interfere with the diabetic medication acarbose, though it also reduces the bloating associated with the drug.

== History ==
Beano was developed in 1990 by Alan Kligerman of AkPharma after research into gas-causing vegetables that had begun in 1981. The idea for such a product was proposed at least as early as the 1780s in Benjamin Franklin's essay "A Letter to a Royal Academy". In 1991, Kligerman was awarded the inaugural Ig Nobel Prize in Medicine for inventing Beano.

Its patent was acquired by GlaxoSmithKline in 2001 from Block Drug. GlaxoSmithKline sold Beano and 16 other brands to Prestige Brands in 2012.

Beano received U.S. patent 5,445,957 on August 29, 1995. The estimated expiration date of the patent is December 5, 2014. As of early 2013, more than four dozen competing products were on the market.

In April 2014, the brand introduced Beano +Dairy Defense, a product combining α-GAL with lactase.

In India, alpha galactosidase tablets are available as Bloateez marketed by Geminova Life.

== Use in brewing ==
Simple sugars are also produced as a consequence of the malting process that eventually produces beer. The complex sugars are not broken down by the yeast, and are eventually consumed by the beer drinker, possibly causing flatulence. Homebrewers have found adding Beano to their brew may produce a beer that has a less malty flavor. Beano breaks the complex sugars into simple sugars, and these simple sugars are consumed by the yeast, producing alcohol (or some acetic acid in the aerobic reactions in early fermentation).
