= Justin Yoshimura =

American entrepreneur (born 1990)

- Born: 1990 (age 35–36); Torrance, CA
- Occupations: Founder, 500 Friends; Chairman, Ice.com; Chairman, DirectBuy; Founder & CEO, CSC Generation
- Years active: 2004–present

Justin Yoshimura (born 1990) is an American technology entrepreneur and investor. He is the founder, chairman, and CEO of the holding company CSC Generation.

== Early life ==
Yoshimura was raised in Palos Verdes Estates, California. As a student at Palos Verdes High School, he launched CellsWholesale.com, an online marketplace for cell phones. In its first year, the business generated $1 million in revenue, and he dropped out of high school in his junior year to run the business full-time. He sold it in 2008.

== Career ==
In 2010, Yoshimura founded 500friends, a cloud-based platform providing loyalty and other incentive programs for e-commerce companies. It was launched in 2011, and backed by Y Combinator, with Yoshimura as CEO. In March 2012, 500friends raised $4.5 million in Series A financing, led by Crosslink Capital, with participation from Intel Capital, with Yoshimura becoming the youngest entrepreneur Crosslink and Intel had backed at the time. In March 2013, 500friends raised $5 million in Series B financing, led by Intel Capital and Fung Capital, bringing its total funding to $12 million. 500friends was acquired by data marketing firm Merkle Inc. in November 2014, and Yoshimura was named Merkle's senior vice president of loyalty.

In 2014, Yoshimura founded CSC Generation, and purchased the domain name Ice.com, converting it into an online jewelry marketplace. He then acquired several other e-commerce marketplaces, including DirectBuy, in February 2017. In 2017, CSC Generation generated $150 million in sales. CSC is backed by Chinese private equity firm China Science & Merchants Capital Management and Khosla Ventures. In 2018, the Ice.com name was sold. In 2021, CSC Generation purchased Amerimark Holdings which owned three companies: AmeriMark Direct, Dr. Leonard's Healthcare, and LTD Commodities. In early 2023, Amerimark Interactive declared bankruptcy and terminated the employment of over 600 employees. In October 2023, DirectBuy declared bankruptcy and will likely close all 21 remaining stores and layoff 250 people.

Yoshimura also invests in early stage startups, including the media company MACRO, and technology companies Zencoder, Hipmunk, and Bounce Exchange. Hipmunk has since shut down. In 2011, he was named to the Forbes 30 Under 30 in the Social/Mobile category.
