= Redox Brands =

Former American marketing company

- Company type: Private
- Industry: Consumer goods
- Founded: May 2000; 26 years ago
- Founder: Todd Wichmann; Richard Owen
- Defunct: 2006
- Fate: Merged
- Successor: CR Brands
- Headquarters: West Chester, Ohio, U.S.
- Key people: Richard Owen (CEO)
- Products: Laundry detergents
- Owner: Todd Wichmann (minority); Richard Owen
- Parent: Meriwether Capital; Allied Capital; P&G (minor)

Redox Brands was a marketing company formed in 2000 by Todd Wichmann and Richard Owen, former executives with the multinational consumer products firm Procter & Gamble (P&G). The company's first product was Oxydol brand purchased from P&G. P&G would continue manufacturing Oxydol and provide back office support. Redox had won out over private label companies in the purchase of Oxydol. Biz was purchased in an auction from P&G in the Summer of 2000. Forbes estimated that Oxydol was sold for $7 million and Biz for greater than $40 million. In one year, Oxydol sales were 800% greater than when acquired.

In March 2001, Allied Capital made its first investment in Redox and made an additional investment in August 2002. In 2002, Wichmann left Redox for another startup, HealthPro Brands.

Allied Capital acquired ChemPro, Inc. in March 2006. Allied then merged Redox and ChemPro, Inc., with the resulting company being renamed CR Brands.

== Brands ==
- Biz
- Oxydol

== See also ==
- ChemPro, Inc.
- CR Brands
- HealthPro Brands
- Prestige Brands, also owns former P&G brands
