= Spic =

Ethnic slur against people from Spanish-speaking countries

Spic (or spick) is an ethnic slur used in the United States to describe Hispanic and Latino Americans or Spanish-speaking people from Latin America.

== Etymology and history ==
Some sources from the United States believe that the word spic is a play on a Spanish-accented pronunciation of the English word speak. The Oxford English Dictionary takes spic to be a contraction of the earlier form spiggoty. The oldest known use of spiggoty is in 1910 by Wilbur Lawton in Boy Aviators in Nicaragua, or, In League with the Insurgents. Stuart Berg Flexner, in I Hear America Talking (1976), favored the explanation that it derives from a mispronunciation by Spanish speakers of the phrase "I do not speak English," rendered as "no spik Ingles" or "no spika de Ingles."

However, in an earlier publication, the 1960 Dictionary of American Slang, written by Dr. Harold Wentworth, with Flexner as second author, spic is first identified as a noun for an Italian or "American of Italian ancestry", along with the words spic, spig, and spiggoty, and confirms that it is shortened from the word spaghetti. The authors refer to the word's usage in James M. Cain's Mildred Pierce, referring to a "wop or spig", and say that this term was never preferred over wop, and has been rarely used since 1915. However, the etymology remains.

== See also ==
- Racism towards Hispanic and Latino Americans in the United States
- Spic and Span
