= Joy (dishwashing liquid) =

Brand of dish-cleaning detergent

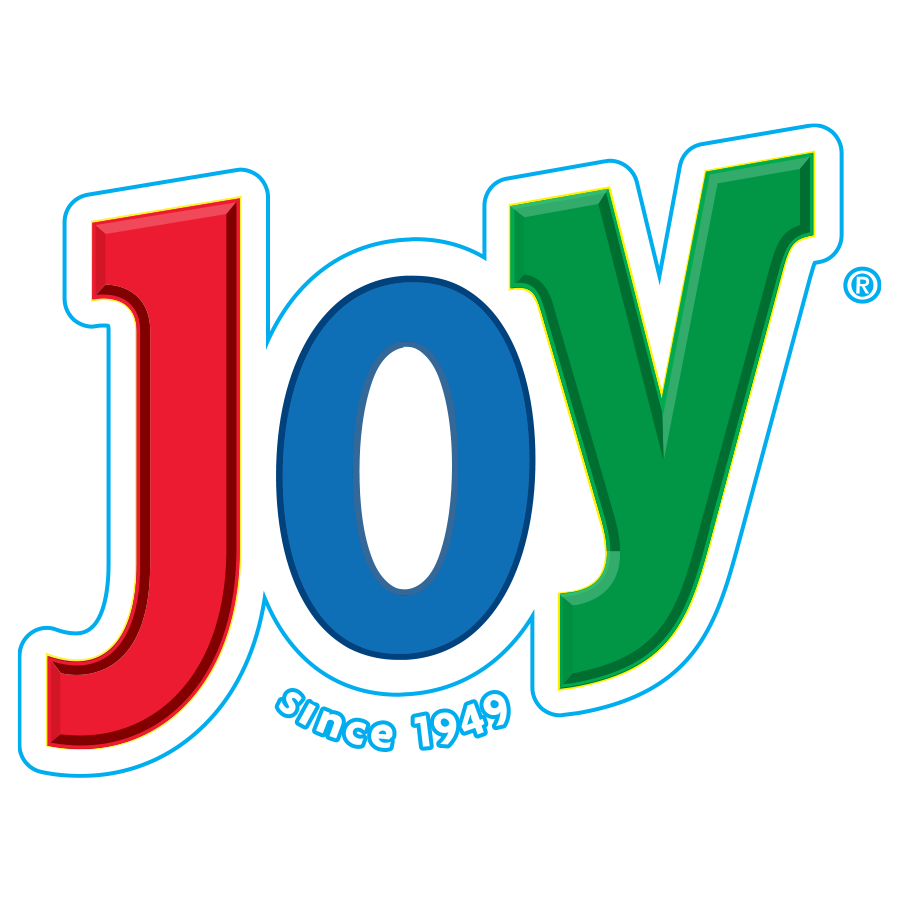
- Product type: Dishwashing
- Current owner: JoySuds, LLC (United States, Canada and Latin America and Caribbean); Procter & Gamble (except United States, Canada and Latin America and Caribbean)
- Country: United States
- Introduced: 1949; 77 years ago
- Previous owners: Procter & Gamble (United States, Canada and Latin America and Caribbean)
- Website: www.joysuds.com

Joy is an American brand of dishwashing liquid detergent owned by JoySuds, LLC. The brand was introduced in the United States in 1949 by Procter & Gamble. In 2019, Procter & Gamble sold the rights to the Joy brand for the Americas to JoySuds, LLC.

== Overview ==
The brand was an early and long-term sponsor of several "soap operas", including the long-running pioneering soap Search for Tomorrow. There are several kinescopes existing of 1950s' soap operas containing these commercials, usually with the famous slogan, "From grease to shine in half the time". Joy was an early example of a product being reformulated to include the fragrance of lemons and helped begin the overall trend toward citrus-scented cleaning products.

Joy is designed for use in the hand washing of dishes, not automatic dishwashers, and as such also contains emollients designed to protect the user's hands from drying out. Available in both "ultra" (concentrated) and "non-ultra" (regular) strengths, Joy is known across North America, with customers in both the US and Latin American retail markets.

Although Joy's stapled lemon fragrance remains its most widely distributed line, Orange Joy has grown in popularity in recent years. The brand also offers a commercial grade detergent formula, Joy Professional, which is commonly used in restaurant, hotel and other commercial settings due to its high concentration of surfactants and cleaning effectiveness.

Joy was introduced in Japan during the 1990s, where it became market leader for a period of time.

== See also ==
- List of cleaning agents
