= Spic and Span =

Household cleaner

Spic 'n' Span
- Product type: Household cleaner
- Current owner: KIK Custom Products Inc.
- Country: United States
- Introduced: 1933; 93 years ago
- Previous owners: Procter & Gamble, Prestige Brands
- Website: spicnspan.com

Spic and Span is a brand of all-purpose household cleaner marketed by KIK Custom Products Inc. for home consumer use and by Procter & Gamble for professional (non-home-consumer) use.

== History ==
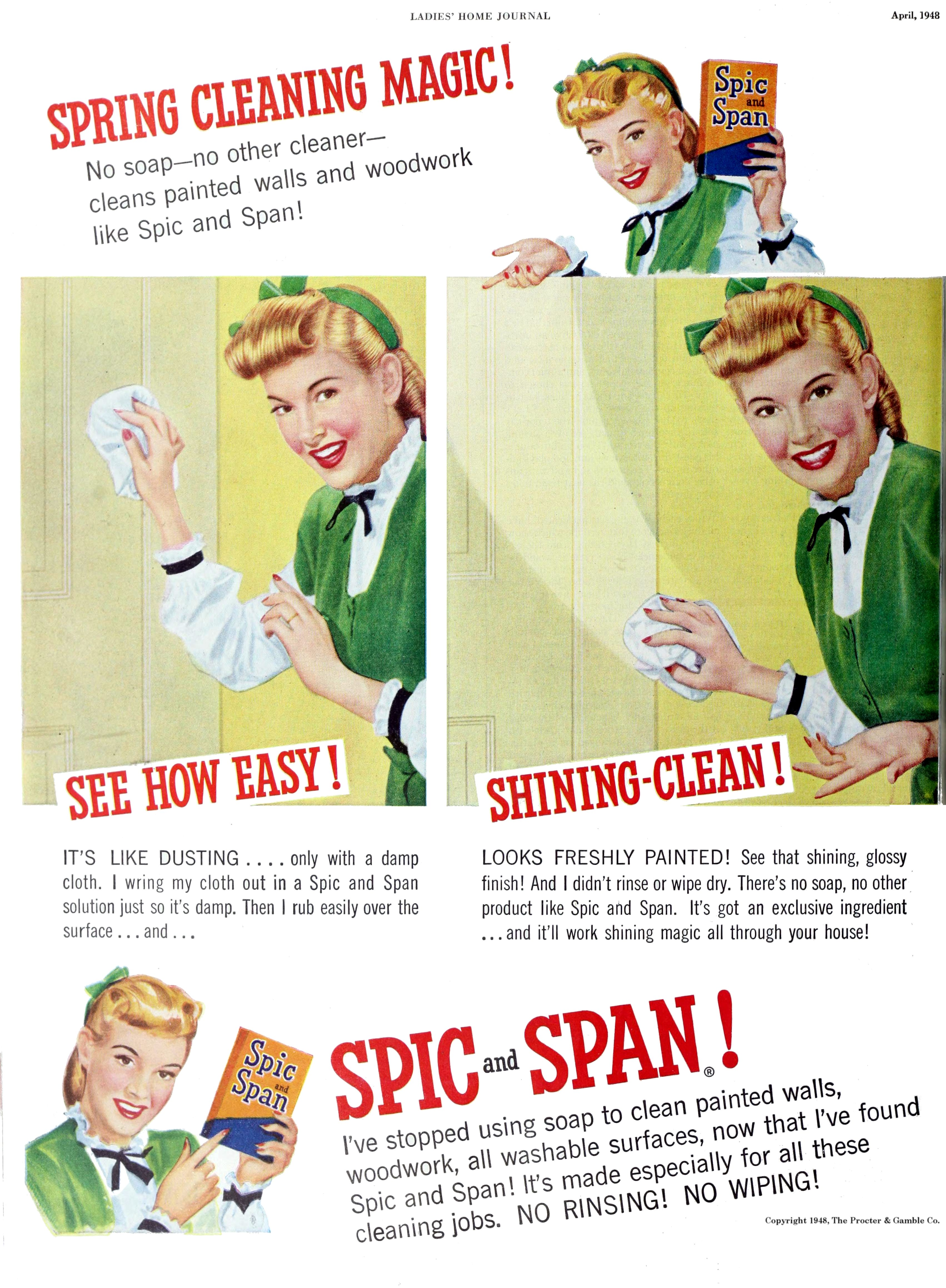
1948 advertisement for the product.

On June 15, 1926, Whistle Bottling Company of Johnsonburg, Pennsylvania, registered "Spic and Span" trademark No. 214,076 — washing and cleaning compound in crystal form with incidental water-softening properties.

The modern cleaner was invented by housewives Elizabeth "Bet" MacDonald and Naomi Stenglein in Saginaw, Michigan in 1933. Their formula included equal parts of ground-up glue, sodium carbonate, and trisodium phosphate; though trisodium phosphate is no longer part of the modern formula out of a concern for environmental damage from phosphates making their way into waterways. Stenglein observed that testing in her house made it spotless, or "spick and span". They took the k off "spick" and started selling the product to local markets. From 1933 to 1944, both families helped run their "Spic and Span Products Company". On January 29, 1945, Procter & Gamble, a major international manufacturer of household and personal products based in Cincinnati, Ohio, bought Spic and Span for $1.9 million. On August 30, 1949, Procter & Gamble registered the "Spic and Span" trademark (soluble cleaner, cleanser, and detergent).

The product was advertised in many soap operas, serving as the main sponsor of Search for Tomorrow for two decades.

The brand, along with Comet, was acquired by Prestige Brands in 2001. In 2018, Prestige Brands sold the brand to KIK Custom Products Inc. Procter & Gamble retained the rights to market the brand to the professional (non-home-consumer) market in the United States.

== Usage ==
The powdered form must be mixed in water to use. A liquid version is also available. Although considered all-purpose, it is "not recommended for carpets, upholstery, aluminum, glass, laundry, or mixing with bleach or ammonia" as written on product label.

== Etymology ==
The product was named from the older phrase "spick and span".

The phrase "span-new" meant as new as a freshly cut wood chip, such as those once used to make spoons. In a metaphor dating from at least 1300, something span-new was neat and unstained.

Spic was added in the 16th century, as a "spick" (a spike or nail) was another metaphor for something neat and trim. The British phrase may have evolved from the Dutch spiksplinter nieuw, "spike-splinter new". In 1665, Samuel Pepys used "spicke and span" in his famous diary. The "clean" sense appears to have arisen only recently. The term is completely unrelated to the modern epithet spic.
