= Norman Larsen =

American chemist

Norman Bernard Larsen (1923—1970) was an American industrial chemist.

== Biography ==
He was born in Chicago.

Larsen is sometimes credited with inventing the WD-40 formula in 1953 but this is not certain. The WD-40 company website and other books and newspapers credit him but according to Iris Engstrand, a historian of San Diego and California at the University of San Diego, it was actually Iver Norman Lawson (also an engineer born in Chicago at around the same time as Norm Larsen), and the names became confused over time. The formula was kept as a trade secret, so no patent was ever filed listing inventors.

Larsen left the Rocket Chemical Company (the original producers of WD-40) in 1958 after a verbal agreement between Rocket and a distributor fell apart; the distributor set up CRC Industries in Philadelphia to directly compete with Rocket and Larsen left to lead it. CRC was originally called Corrosion Reaction Consultants, Inc. Its first product was called CRC Corrosion Inhibitor, also called 5–56.

By 1968 Larsen had left CRC and had founded a company called Surcon, Inc. headquartered in Collegeville, PA, which also had developed a chemical anti-corrosion formula eventually called "Free 'n Kleen"; the company used it to remove corrosion from the wreck of a Spanish galleon found off the Florida coast. By 1970 the product was being used by Sikorsky Aircraft Corp in its helicopters and was also used by the military to keep machine guns working.

Larsen died in December 1970 at home at the age of 47, of an apparent heart attack.
