= Edward N. Costikyan =

American lawyer (1924–2012)

- Born: September 24, 1924; Weehawken, New Jersey, U.S.
- Died: June 22, 2012 (aged 87); Mount Pleasant, South Carolina
- Occupations: politician, writer, lawyer
- Political party: Democratic Party
- Spouse: Frances Holmgren (divorced) Barbara Fatt Heine (divorced)
- Children: 2 including Greg Costikyan
- Parent: Mihran N. Costikyan Berthe M. Costikyan

Grand Sachem of Tammany Hall
- Preceded by: Carmine DeSapio
- Succeeded by: J. Raymond Jones
- In office 1962–1964

Edward N. Costikyan (September 24, 1924 – June 22, 2012) was an American Democratic Party politician who was notable for reforming the party in New York City. He was also the author of many books and articles on varied topics of public policy and political science.

== Early life and education ==
Costikyan was born in Weehawken, New Jersey on September 24, 1924. By 1940, he and his family (father, Mihran Nazar Costikyan; mother, Berthe Muller Costikyan; and older brother Andrew M. Costikyan) had moved to West 122nd Street in the Morningside Heights neighborhood of Manhattan. His father was an oriental rug dealer of Armenian descent while his mother was a native of Switzerland. He graduated from Horace Mann School, where his mother taught, and served in World War II. He graduated from Columbia University in 1947, and Columbia Law School in 1949. He clerked for a year for Judge Harold R. Medina at the U.S. District Court.

== Career ==
In 1951 he joined the firm of Paul, Weiss, Rifkind, Wharton & Garrison, in his first position as an associate lawyer. He became a partner of that firm in 1960. In 1962, Costikyan was elected chairman of the New York County Democratic Committee, defeating Carmine DeSapio, and served two years. He was credited for removing Tammany Hall influence, thus reforming the Democratic Party and bringing it into the 20th Century. He was Abraham Beame's campaign manager in the 1965 Mayoral campaign. He served on commissions investigating the New York City government for Governor Nelson A. Rockefeller and Mario M. Cuomo. He dropped out of his campaign for Mayor in 1977, but instead joined the campaign of Edward I. Koch, formerly a political adversary. For many years until his death, he served as a member of the advisory board for the Center for New York City Law at New York Law School.

== Personal life ==
Costikyan was married twice. His first marriage to Frances Holmgren ended in divorce. In 1977, he married Barbara Heine, a freelance writer and daughter of advertising executive, Arthur C. Fatt in a Unitarian ceremony. He has two children from his first marriage including game designer Greg Costikyan. He was a founder and conductor for the Occasional Oratorio and Orchestral Society.

Coskityan died on June 22, 2012, at the age of 87, at his daughter's home in Mount Pleasant, South Carolina.

== Partial bibliography ==
Costikyan was the author of many works on the law, public policy, and political science, including:

=== Books ===
- Edward N. Costikyan, Behind closed doors: politics in the public interest (Harcourt Brace 1966).
- Edward N. Costikyan, New Strategies for Regional Cooperation; a Model for the Tri-State New York-New Jersey-Connecticut Area (1973)
- Edward N. Costikyan, How to Win Votes: The Politics of Nineteen Eighty (Harcourt 1980) ISBN 9780151422210.
- Edward N. Costikyan, What Happened To The Body Politic: Can it Be Restored? (Publish America 2005) ISBN 9781413762143.
- Edward N. Costikyan, Commentaries by Edward N. Costikyan: The Luck of the Draw and other essays (peachland books 2006) ISBN 9781413762136.

=== Articles ===
- Costikyan, Edward (Winter 1992). "Ethnic Politics Lays an Egg". City Journal. Archived from the original on June 20, 2012.
- Costikyan, Edward (Winter 1994). "Cutting City Government Down to Size". City Journal. Archived from the original on June 20, 2012.
- Edward N. Costikyan & Maxwell Lehman (October 1980). "The Heavenly city". Harper's.

=== Oral history ===
- Oral History Interview with Edward N. Costikyan at Google Books

== See also ==
- List of Armenian Americans
- List of Armenian American politicians
