= Barbara Costikyan =

American writer (1928–2020)

- Barbara Heine, from a 1950 bridal announcement.
- Born: Barbara Virginia Fatt; December 25, 1928; New York City
- Died: June 18, 2020 (aged 91); Edgewater, New Jersey
- Other name: Barbara Heine
- Occupation: Writer
- Spouse: Edward N. Costikyan
- Parent: Arthur C. Fatt
- Relatives: Greg Costikyan (stepson)

Barbara Heine Costikyan (December 25, 1928 – June 18, 2020), born Barbara Virginia Fatt, was an American food writer.

== Early life ==
Barbara Virginia Fatt was born in New York City, the daughter of Arthur C. Fatt and Virginia Finder Fatt (later Gernsback). Her father was an advertising executive. She attended the Birch Wathen School in Manhattan, and graduated from Smith College in 1950.

== Career ==
Barbara Heine was an editor at Esquire magazine, and a political hostess through her second husband's work in New York City. During the 1980 Democratic National Convention, she hosted a reception for the Alaska delegation.

Costikyan became a contributor to New York magazine in 1980, writing the "Underground Gourmet" column, and other features about affordable dining in the city. Her writing reflected an interest not only in the food on the plate, but in the people who prepare it. "I can't think about food without thinking about the people who do it. It is, after all, a very human enterprise. People prepare it with love for other people to eat," she explained in 1980. She also wrote for The New York Times, Harper's Bazaar, and Cosmopolitan magazine, and published a children's book, Be Kind to Your Dog at Christmas (1982).

== Personal life ==
Barbara Fatt married twice. Her first husband was lawyer Andrew Heine; they married in 1950, and had three children before they divorced. Her second husband was lawyer Edward N. Costikyan; they married in 1977, and later divorced. Game designer and writer Greg Costikyan was her stepson. Barbara Costikyan died from complications of COVID-19 in June 2020, at the age of 91.
