= DenTek =

DenTek Oral Care, Inc.
- Company type: Private
- Industry: Consumer goods
- Founded: 1985
- Headquarters: 307 Excellence Way, Maryville, Tennessee, United States 37801
- Key people: David Fox (CEO)
- Number of employees: 80
- Website: DenTek.com

DenTek Oral Care, Inc. is an American private company that develops, manufactures and markets oral care products. DenTek was founded in 1985 by John Jansheski. His father, John Jansheski, invented an at-home tartar removal device. Their products are available in the United States, Canada, Germany, and the United Kingdom.
