= Lava (soap) =

Brand of heavy duty hand cleaner

- Product type: Soap
- Current owner: WD-40 Company
- Country: St. Louis, Missouri, United States
- Introduced: 1893; 133 years ago
- Previous owners: Waltke Company (1893–1927); Procter & Gamble (1927–1995); Block Drug (1995–1999)
- Website: www.lavasoap.com

Lava is a heavy-duty hand cleaner in soap bar form manufactured by the WD-40 Company. Unlike typical soap bars, Lava contains ground volcanic pumice, which gave the soap its name. The company website states that the hand cleaner removes grease, grime, paint, ink, and glue.

Lava's long-time slogan was "Cleans the dirt, protects the skin."

== History ==
Lava soap was developed in 1893 by the William Waltke Company of St. Louis.

In 1927, Procter & Gamble acquired the Lava and Oxydol brands from William Waltke Company. P&G sold the Lava brand to Block Drug in 1995. That year Lava soap had annual retail sales of $6 million, while P&G's soap brands Zest and Ivory each had annual sales of $100 million. Block stated they were a niche marketer, and Lava would fit into the sector of cleaning products

The WD-40 Company acquired the brand from Block Drug in April 1999.
