= WD-40 =

Lubricating oil and water displacement spray

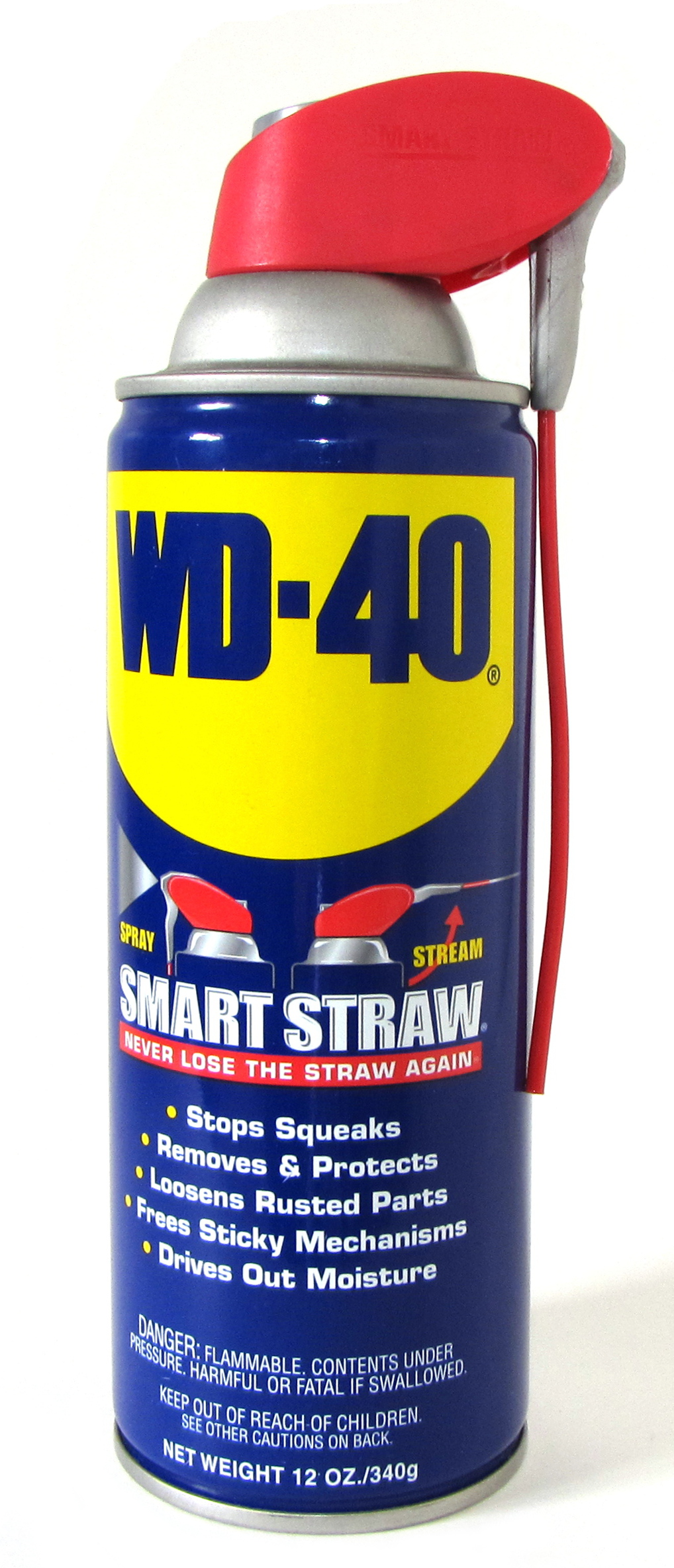
- A can of WD-40 with Smart Straw
- Product type: Water displacer
- Current owner: WD-40 Company
- Country: San Diego, California, United States
- Introduced: 1958; 68 years ago
- Website: www.wd40.com

WD-40 (Note: An abbreviation of Water Displacement, 40th formula.) is a multi-purpose water-displacing product with penetrating and lubricating properties, manufactured by the WD-40 Company based in San Diego, California. Its formula was invented by the company (then known as the Rocket Chemical Company) in 1953, and it became available as a commercial product in 1958. It acts as a lubricant, rust preventive, penetrant and moisture displacer. In 2014, it was inducted into the International Air & Space Hall of Fame at the San Diego Air & Space Museum.

== History ==
Sources credit different people with inventing the WD-40 formula in 1953 as part of the Rocket Chemical Company (later renamed to the WD-40 Company), in San Diego, California; the formula was kept as a trade secret and was never patented to avoid public disclosure of the ingredients.

According to Iris Engstrand, a historian of San Diego and California history at the University of San Diego, Iver Norman Lawson invented the formula, while the WD-40 company website and other books and newspapers credit Norman B. Larsen. According to Engstrand, "(Iver Norman) Lawson was acknowledged at the time, but his name later became confused with company president Norman B. Larsen." "WD-40" is abbreviated from the term "Water Displacement, 40th formula"; the product was the result of the fortieth attempt at developing its formulation. The spray, composed of various hydrocarbons, was originally designed to be used by Convair to protect the outer skin of the Atlas missile from rust and corrosion. This outer skin also functioned as the outer wall of the missile's delicate balloon tanks. WD-40 was later found to have many household uses and was made available to consumers in San Diego in 1958.

In Engstrand's account, it was Iver Norman Lawson who came up with the water-displacing mixture after working at home and turned it over to the Rocket Chemical Company for the sum of $500 (equivalent to $6,000 in 2025). It was Norman Larsen, president of the company, who had the idea of packaging it in aerosol cans and marketed it in this way.

It was written up as a new consumer product in 1961. By 1965 it was being used by airlines including Delta and United; United, for example, was using it on fixed and movable joints of their DC-8 and Boeing 720s in maintenance and overhaul. At that time, airlines were using a variant called WD-60 to clean turbines, removing light rust from control lines, and when handling or storing metal parts. By 1969 WD-40 was being marketed to farmers and mechanics in England. In 1973, WD-40 Company, Inc., went public with its first stock offering. Its NASDAQ stock symbol is (Nasdaq: WDFC).

== Formulation ==
WD-40's formula is a trade secret. The original copy of the formula was moved to a secure bank vault in San Diego in 2018. To avoid disclosing its composition, the product was not patented in 1953, and the window of opportunity for patenting it has long since closed.

WD-40's main ingredients as supplied in aerosol cans, according to the US material safety data sheet information, and with the CAS numbers interpreted:

- 45–50% low vapor pressure aliphatic hydrocarbon (isoparaffin)
- <35% petroleum base oil (non-hazardous heavy paraffins)
- <25% aliphatic hydrocarbons (same CAS number as the first item, but flammable)
- 2–3% carbon dioxide (propellant)

The European formulation is stated according to the REACH regulations:

- 60–80% hydrocarbons C_{9} – C_{11} n-alkanes, iso-alkanes, cyclics <2% aromatics
- 1–5% carbon dioxide

The Australian formulation is stated:

- 50–60% naphtha (petroleum), hydrotreated heavy
- <25% petroleum base oils
- <10% naphtha (petroleum), hydrodesulfurized heavy (contains: 1,2,4-trimethyl benzene, 1,3,5-trimethyl benzene, xylene, mixed isomers)
- 2–4% carbon dioxide

In 2009, Wired published an article with the results of gas chromatography and mass spectrometry tests on WD-40, showing that the principal components were C_{9} to C_{14} alkanes and mineral oil.

== See also ==
- Ballistol
- CRC Industries
