= Block Drug =

Pharmaceutical company

Block Drug Company
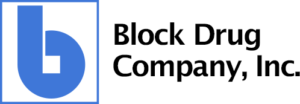

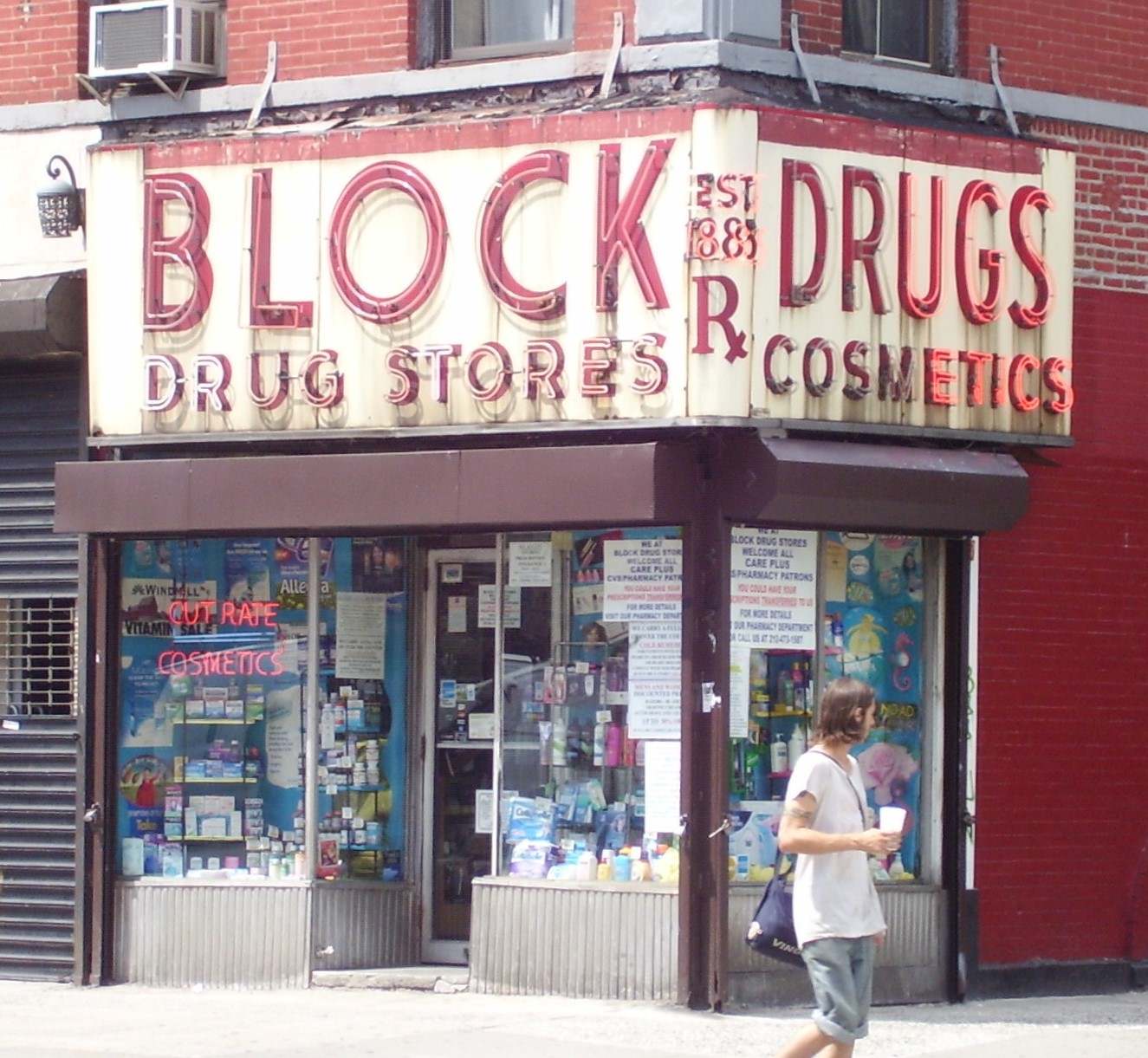
- A pharmacy in the East Village neighborhood of Manhattan, New York City (2012)
- Traded as: Nasdaq: BLOC
- Industry: Pharmaceutical
- Founded: 1907; 119 years ago
- Defunct: 2001; 25 years ago
- Fate: Acquired by GSK
- Successor: GlaxoSmithKline (now GSK plc) (2001-2022); Haleon(Consumer Products) (2022-present)
- Headquarters: Jersey City, New Jersey, United States
- Key people: Alexander Block, Leonard Block, Thomas Block, Michael P. Danziger
- Products: Polident, Poli-Grip, Dentu-Creme, Nytol, Tegrin, Lava Soap, Beano, Phazyme, Balmex, Sensodyne
- Number of employees: 3,000

Block Drug Company was a pharmaceutical company based in Jersey City, New Jersey, United States, that specialized in dental care products. Its most popular products included Polident denture cleanser, Poli-Grip denture adhesive, Dentu-Creme denture toothpaste, Nytol sleeping pill, Tegrin medicated shampoo for psoriasis, Lava hand soaps (acquired from Procter & Gamble), Beano and Phazyme anti-gas products, Balmex diaper rash ointments, and Sensodyne desensitizing toothpaste.

GlaxoSmithKline (now GSK plc) purchased the company for $1.24 billion in 2001.

== History ==
The company was founded in 1907 by Alexander Block, a Russian immigrant who had a small drugstore on Fulton Street in Brooklyn, New York. He turned the company into a wholesaler in 1915, then became a drug manufacturer in 1925, acquiring a 50 percent interest in Wernet's Dental Manufacturing Company.

Block Drug moved its headquarters to Jersey City, New Jersey in 1938.

Although Alexander Block built the company largely through acquisitions, he developed the Polident brand internally during the 1930s. After Alexander Block's death in 1953, his son Leonard N. Block (1911–2005) took over, eventually becoming the company's chairman.

=== Timeline ===
- 1948 – introduced Ammi-i-Dent tooth powder
- early 1950s – Nytol.
- 1964 – introduced Tegrin
- 1971 – The company went public, trading on Nasdaq under the ticker symbol BLOCA and raising $5.2 million in its initial public offering( IPO). Two years later, another stock sale generated $23 million. Later in the 1970s, Efferdent took over from Polident as the No. 1 brand in its space.
- 1972 – Block named as its president James Block, who was the grandson of Alexander Block and the nephew of Leonard N. Block. In 1988, James became chairman as his uncle, Leonard N. Block became senior chairman. At the same time, Leonard N. Block's son, Thomas, became the company's president.
- 1978 – Block Drug entered the feminine hygiene market, with the ultimately unsuccessful Gentle Spring brand.
- 1982 – The company acquired Phazyme/700 from the Stuart division of ICI, leading to the OTC entrance of Phazyme.
- 1983 – The company acquired Passaic, New Jersey–based 2000 Flushes toilet bowl cleaner manufacturer Flushco. In 1985, Block Drug acquired the X-14 line of hard surface cleaners from White Laboratories. Block Drug later acquired Gold Bond in 1987.
- 1990s – Sales began to fall as Block Drug's products began to age and face new competition, and the problem was exacerbated by a lack of new products.
- 1990 – Block Drug sold Gold Bond to Martin Himmel Inc.
- 1995 – Block Drug divested its U.S. Reed and Carnrick Pharmaceuticals Division to Schwarz Pharma KermersUrban and also purchased Reckitt and Colman's Carpet Fresh and Rug Fresh cleaning and deodorizing products.
- Late 1995 – The company acquired the Lava soap brand from Procter & Gamble.
- 1996 – Block Drug purchased the Baby's Own line of baby care products, and then acquired Beano antigas tablets in 1997.
- 1998 – A major restructuring took place but was not successful. As part of that, the company divested Carpet Fresh, Rug Fresh, 2000 Flushes and X-14. Lava was later sold to WD-40 Company the following year.
- 1999 – The company acquired Salisbury, N.C.–based Stanback Co., manufacturer of Stanback headache powder products.
- 2000 – Block Drug hired Goldman Sachs as an adviser to evaluate a potential sale.
- 2001 – At the time of its sale to Glaxo, Block Drug was reported to have $900 million in annual sales, operations in 100 countries and employed 3,000 people.

=== Secrecy ===
Although Block Drug was a public company from 1971 until 2001, it operated much like a private, family-run firm, with the Block family holding all voting shares plus 54 percent of the non-voting stock. In addition, the company never held annual meetings or issued proxy statements.

== Aftermath ==
at Some point in 2003, GlaxoSmithKline sold Balmex to Johnson & Johnson(Which would later spin-off its consumer healthcare as Kenvue, a Major Rival to Haleon), However there was no record of it happening in the news, the only proof that it did happen was in Balmex's website where it did move from GSK to JNJ. In 2006, as a result of JNJ acquiring Pfizer Consumer Healthcare, Balmex along with 4 other brands got sold to Chattem

Leonard N. Block died in 2005 at age 93 after suffering for years from Alzheimer's disease. Block's nephew John P. Roberts was the producer of the Woodstock using money from his Block inheritance.

In 2011, GSK sold a majority of former Block Drug Brands to Prestige Consumer Healthcare but excludes its oral healthcare brands.

In 2022, GSK spun off its consumer healthcare company as Haleon, which includes their Oral Healthcare Brands
