= Biz (detergent) =

Detergent brand

Biz Stain & Odor Eliminator
- Product type: laundry detergent
- Current owner: Commercial Brands
- Country: United States
- Introduced: 1968
- Previous owners: P&G; Redox Brands
- Tagline: MORE STAIN FIGHTERS than other brands
- Website: bizstainfighter.com

Biz Stain & Odor Eliminator is an enzyme-based, oxygenated and color-safe bleach, detergent booster and pre-treater for laundry stains, sold in both liquid and powder form. It is an enzyme-based bleach that can break down proteins.

== History ==
Biz bleach was invented by Charles McCarty, a researcher at Procter & Gamble (P&G), and introduced to the American market in 1967. Redox Brands purchased it from P&G in an auction held in the summer of 2000. Forbes estimated the purchase price as more than $40 million. Annual sales revenue reached about $40 million one year later.

Biz was recommended for cleaning the skulls of dead animals in an article on the web site of the Alaska Department of Fish and Game, and the writer Bob Harris reported that, when researching for a crime series, he had been told by an FBI employee that the product could be recommended for boiling skulls.
