= Chloraseptic =

American brand of pain relieving medicine

- Product type: Oral analgesic
- Produced by: Prestige Brands Inc
- Country: United States
- Previous owners: Robert Schattner

Chloraseptic is an American brand of oral analgesic that is produced by Tarrytown, New York–based Prestige Consumer Healthcare, and is used for the relief of sore throat and mouth pain. Its active ingredient is phenol (just in Sore Throat Spray, not in Sore Throat Lozenges), a compound whose antiseptic properties were discovered by Friedlieb Ferdinand Runge.

Other Chloraseptic formulas are based on benzocaine.

== History ==
Chloraseptic was invented and originally made by Robert Schattner (born Isaac Schattner; 1925-2017); it was later bought by Richardson-Vicks, which merged with Cincinnati, Ohio–based Procter & Gamble in 1985.

== Products ==
Its current spray products include Cherry Throat Spray, MAX Wild Berry Targeted Throat Spray, Menthol Throat Spray, Warming Honey Lemon Throat Spray, Cherry On-The-Go Throat Spray, and Citrus Throat Spray.

Its current lozenge products include MAX Wild Berry, TOTAL Wild Cherry, Cherry with Soothing Liquid Center, TOTAL Sugar-Free Wild Cherry, Citrus with Soothing Liquid Center, and Warming Honey Lemon.
