= Iris Engstrand =

American academic (1935–2026)

Iris Higbie Wilson Engstrand
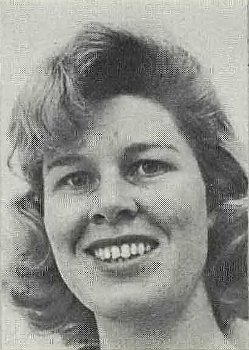
- Iris H. Wilson in 1963
- Born: January 9, 1935; Los Angeles, California, U.S.
- Died: September 12, 2026 (aged 91)
- Known for: Scholarship on California history and 18th-century Spanish exploration
- Awards: Order of Isabella the Catholic (2007)

Academic background
- Education: University of Southern California (BA, 1956; MA, 1957; PhD, 1962)
- Thesis: Scientific Aspects of Spanish Exploration in New Spain during the Late Eighteenth Century (1962)
- Doctoral advisor: Donald C. Cutter

Academic work
- Discipline: History
- Sub-discipline: History of California; Spanish exploration; History of New Spain
- Institutions: University of San Diego; University of Southern California; Long Beach City College

Iris Higbie Wilson Engstrand (January 9, 1935 – September 12, 2026) was an American academic. She was professor of history at University of San Diego from 1968 until 2017; she joined the faculty of the San Diego College for Men before it and other colleges joined to form the university in 1972.

== Life and career ==
Born was born in Los Angeles, California, on January 9, 1935, she earned her B.A. (1956), M.A. (1957), and Ph.D. (1962) in history from the University of Southern California. Her dissertation topic was "Scientific Aspects of Spanish Exploration in New Spain during the Late Eighteenth Century," and was supervised by Donald C. Cutter. She began her teaching career in the Huntington Beach High School from 1957 to 1959, and then worked as a translator of Spanish manuscripts for the Los Angeles County Museum, 1959–60. She became a lecturer at the University of Southern California in 1962, and an instructor at Long Beach City College in 1962.

Engstrand specialized in the history of California and Spanish exploration during the 1700s, and as of 2017 had written about twenty books on those subjects.

She served on the board of directors of the Maritime Museum of San Diego. Engstrand also served as co-editor of the Journal of San Diego History, 2004–2014; president of the Western History Association, 2004–2005; and in 2007 was awarded the Order of Isabella the Catholic by the government of Spain for her contributions to the field of Spanish history.

Engstrand died on September 12, 2026, at the age of 91.

== Selected works ==
- Engstrand, Iris Wilson (2016). San Diego: California's Cornerstone (2nd ed.). Sunbelt Publications. ISBN 9781941384244.
- Engstrand, Iris H.W. (1981). Spanish scientists in the New World : the eighteenth-century expeditions. Seattle: Univ. of Washington P. ISBN 978-0295957647.
- Engstrand, Iris H. W. (11 December 2015). "The Enlightenment in Spain: Influences Upon New World Policy". The Americas. 41 (4): 436–444. doi:10.2307/1007350. JSTOR 1007350.
- Engstrand, Iris H.W. (Fall 2014). "WD-40: San Diego's Marketing Miracle" (PDF). The Journal of San Diego History. 60 (4): 253–270.
- Engstrand, Iris H. W., & Bullard, Anne. (1999). Inspired by nature: The San Diego Natural History Museum After 125 years. San Diego Natural History Museum.
- Engstrand, Iris H. W (February 2000). "Of Fish and Men: Spanish Marine Science during the Late Eighteenth Century". Pacific Historical Review. 69 (1): 3–30. doi:10.2307/3641236. JSTOR 3641236.
