= Prell =

Shampoo and conditioner product manufactured by Scott's Liquid Gold-Inc

- Product type: Shampoo; Conditioner
- Current owner: Prell Products inc
- Country: United States
- Introduced: 1947
- Markets: United States
- Previous owners: Procter & Gamble; Prestige Brands; Ultimark Products

Prell is a viscous, pearl-green shampoo and conditioner product manufactured by Scott's Liquid Gold-Inc through their Neoteric Cosmetics subsidiary.

== History ==
Prell was formulated by Chemist Harvey Milner and introduced by Procter & Gamble in 1947. The original formula was a clear green concentrate packaged in a tube. In 1955 Prell was marketed for women "who want their hair to have that radiantly alive look". A woman held the Prell bottle with her hands on both sides, directly in front of her face.

Prell and Head & Shoulders, also made by Procter & Gamble, were the two best-selling shampoos in the United States in June 1977. Procter & Gamble had the highest advertising budget in the shampoo industry. The firm of Wells, Rich, Greene carried out advertising for Prell. Prior to December 1, 1973, Prell billings were coordinated by Benton & Bowles. In advertisements the quasi-liquid Prell would induce a pearl to sink slowly to the bottom of a container.

Procter & Gamble sold the brand to Prestige Brands International in November 1999. Prestige then sold Prell, along with its other two shampoo brands, Denorex and Zincon, to Ultimark Products in October 2009 in order to focus more on their two larger segments: over-the-counter healthcare and household cleaning products. In July 2016, Scott's Liquid Gold-Inc. acquired Prell, along with the Denorex and Zincon brands, from Ultimark products. Prell Products Inc. acquired Prell from Scott's Liquid Gold in 2022.

== Other variations ==
Prell launched an additional version in the late 1990s called Prell Thickening Formula. Instead of being green, this product was colorless and boasted volumizing abilities. It was pulled from the market in 2009, after Prestige Brands sold Prell, along with anti-dandruff shampoo Denorex, to Ultimark.
