= Oxydol =

Laundry detergent brand

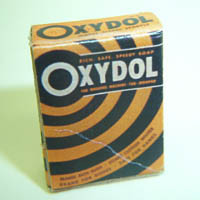
- Product type: Laundry detergent
- Current owner: Fab+Kind Co.
- Country: USA
- Introduced: 1914; 112 years ago
- Markets: United States, Canada, United Kingdom
- Previous owners: P&G; Redox Brands

Oxydol is a brand of laundry detergent sold in the United States, Canada, and the United Kingdom.

== History ==
=== Inception and early years ===
It was created in 1914 by Thomas Hedley Co. of Newcastle upon Tyne and purchased by Procter & Gamble in 1930. It was P&G's first laundry soap. In the 1930s, Oxydol was the sponsor of the Ma Perkins radio show, considered the first soap opera; as such, Oxydol sponsorship put the "soap" in "soap opera".

In the mid-1950s, the soap was suffering declining sales, due in large part to P&G's introduction of its popular detergent, Tide. As a result, the soap formula was discontinued, and Oxydol was transformed into a detergent product, with color safe bleach.

=== Later years ===
In 1992, Ultra Oxydol was introduced.

P&G sold the brand in 2000 to Redox Brands, a marketing company founded by former Procter & Gamble employees. Redox Brands was merged into CR Brands in 2006.

In 2019, the brand was sold to Fab+Kind, which also owns the former US Phoenix Brands detergents.

In 2021, Fantastik Brands Limited, acquired the Oxydol brand for the United Kingdom.
