= Prestige Consumer Healthcare =

American company that markets and distributes over-the-counter healthcare

Prestige Consumer Healthcare Inc.
- Formerly: Prestige Brands Holdings, Inc. (1996–2018)
- Company type: Public
- Traded as: NYSE: PBH; S&P 600 component
- Industry: Over-The-Counter Healthcare products, and Household Cleaning products
- Founded: 1996; 30 years ago
- Headquarters: Tarrytown, New York, U.S.
- Revenue: ▲US$1,086.8 million (2022)
- Operating income: ▲US$329.9 million (2022)
- Net income: ▲US$205.3 million (2022)
- Number of employees: 535 (2022)
- Website: prestigebrands.com

Prestige Consumer Healthcare Inc. (formerly Prestige Brands, Inc.) is an American company that markets and distributes over-the-counter healthcare and household cleaning products. It was formed by the merger of Medtech Products, Inc., Prestige Brands International, and the Spic and Span Company in 1996. The company is headquartered in Tarrytown, New York and operates a manufacturing facility in Lynchburg, Virginia.

Among the brands owned by Prestige are Chloraseptic sore throat products, Clear Eyes, Compound W wart treatment, Dramamine motion sickness treatment, Efferdent denture care, Luden's throat drops, BC Powder and Goody's Headache Powder, Pediacare & Little Remedies children's OTC products and Beano (dietary supplement).

The company's CEO and president is Ron Lombardi, who replaced Matthew Mannelly on June 1, 2015.

== History ==
Prestige Brands Holdings, Inc. was established in 1999 to acquire, revitalize, and line extend leading, often neglected but healthy brands that were considered non-core at major consumer products companies. In 2004, MidOcean Partners sold Prestige Brands to GTCR Golder Rauner.

=== Acquisitions ===
The company acquired Blacksmith Brands' portfolio of five brands in 2010.

In December 2011, the company agreed to purchase 17 brands from GlaxoSmithKline including BC Powder, Beano, Ecotrin, Fiber Choice, Goody's Powder, Sominex and Tagamet for $660 million.

In 2013, Prestige Brands Holdings, Inc. acquired Care Pharmaceuticals of Bondi Junction, New South Wales, Australia, a privately held marketer and distributor of over-the-counter (OTC) healthcare brands for children and adults.

In 2014, the company purchased Hydralyte in Australia and New Zealand from the Hydration Pharmaceuticals Trust of Victoria, Australia. Hydralyte is the leading oral rehydration product in Australia and New Zealand.

In April 2014, Prestige Brands Holdings, Inc. announced that it has entered into a definitive agreement to acquire Insight Pharmaceuticals Corporation, a marketer and distributor of feminine care and other over-the-counter healthcare products, for $750 million in cash.

In November 2015, Prestige Brands Holdings, Inc. announced that it has entered into a definitive agreement to acquire DenTek Oral Care Inc. (DenTek), a privately held marketer and distributor of oral care products for $225 million in cash.

In December 2016, Prestige Brands Holdings, Inc. agreed to buy C.B. Fleet Co. from private-equity firm Gryphon Investors for about $825 million.

In July 2021, consumer health business assets were acquired from Akorn Operating Company, LLC for $228.9 million adding TheraTears and other products to their brands.

=== Divestitures ===
In 2009, Prestige sold its Denorex and Prell brands of shampoo. It has since divested Fiber Choice, PediaCare, New-Skin, and Dermoplast (2016).

In 2018, Prestige sold off their household cleaning supply division.

== Products ==
Prestige Consumer Healthcare owns many over-the counter medicines and products, including:

Digestive care

- Bacid
- Beano
- Dramamine
- Fleet
- Kondremul
- Phazyme
- Tagamet

Eye, ear, nose, and throat

- Allerest PE
- Auro
- Capastat
- Chloraseptic
- Clear Eyes
- Debrox
- Luden's throat lozenges
- Murine Ear & Murine Tears
- NasalCrom
- Nostrilla
- Stye
- Sucrets

Oral care

- DenTek
- Efferdent
- Effergrip
- Ezo
- Fresh Guard by Efferdent
- Gly-Oxide
- OraBrush
- The Doctor's

Pain relief

- Ecotrin
- Anacin
- BC Powder
- Diabet Aid
- Goody's Powder
- Percogesic
- Stanback

Pediatric care

- Boudreaux's Butt Paste
- Caldesene
- Gentle Naturals
- Little Remedies
- Pedia-Lax

Skin care

- Americaine
- Boil Ease
- Chapet
- Cloverine Salve
- Compound W
- Dermarest
- Freezone
- Mosco
- Nix
- Outgro
- Oxypor
- Skin Shield
- Ting
- Wartner

Sleep aids

- Compul
- Nytol
- Sominex

Women's health

- Monistat
- Norforms
- Summer's Eve
- Uristat
- Vitron C
