= Allied Capital =

- Company type: Private
- Industry: Private equity
- Founded: 1958
- Headquarters: Washington, DC, United States
- Products: Leveraged buyout, Mezzanine capital
- Revenue: ▼US$-258 Million (FY 2009)
- Net income: ▼US$-521 Million (FY 2009)
- Total assets: ▼US$2.67 Billion (FY 2009)
- Total equity: ▼US$1.20 Billion (FY 2009)
- Number of employees: 150
- Parent: Ares Capital Corp.
- Website: www.alliedcapital.com

Allied Capital was a private equity investment firm and mezzanine capital lender providing debt and equity capital for leveraged buyouts, acquisitions and restructurings of established businesses. Allied operated as a Business Development Company, a form of publicly traded private equity company, and was among the largest BDCs. The firm was headquartered in Washington, DC with offices in New York City.

Allied invested primarily in middle-market companies in the business services, financial services, consumer products industrial, health care, retail and energy sectors.

The company was purchased by Ares Capital in 2010.

== History ==
Allied Capital Corporation was founded in 1958 and completed its first public offering of stock in 1960 on the OTC.

In February 1997, Chairman and CEO David Gladstone resigned.

In 2001, Allied was listed on the New York Stock Exchange. Allied's stock was repeatedly noted for a high dividend yield.

=== Allied and Short Sellers ===
Between 2002 and 2008, David Einhorn, the manager of Greenlight Capital, a hedge fund engaged in heavy short selling of Allied's stock as he tried to demonstrate that the company's valuation of its illiquid securities was inflated. This activity led to a highly publicized feud between Einhorn and the company.

As early as 2003, Allied complained publicly about Einhorn's activities. Einhorn's activities in relation to Allied were also examined by the SEC to determine whether his statements about the company were intended to manipulate its stock price.

In 2004, Allied came under scrutiny.

In June 2007, the S.E.C. found that Allied broke securities laws relating to the accounting and valuation of illiquid securities it held. However, it did not issue any fines or penalties, and Allied settled without admitting or denying the allegations.

In 2008, Einhorn authored "Fooling Some of the people All of the Time," describing his concerns about the company's accounting practices and his encounters with the company over those years. In his book, Einhorn explains how he uncovers the fact that Allied Capital is basically run as a ponzi scheme and in order to keep the appearances of a valid investment proposition, Allied Capital is forced to cook the books by constantly overpricing its loans and the value of its subsidiaries.

In 2008, Allied came under wider criticism for aggressive accounting policies.

=== The 2007-2009 Credit Crunch ===
As the credit markets began to slow in 2007, Allied appeared to be unaffected. In January 2008, Allied completed a structured secondary transaction with Goldman Sachs. Goldman and Allied created AGILE Fund I, LLC, a new special purpose vehicle to acquire $170 million of private equity and mezzanine capital interests from Allied Capital, representing 13.7% of Allied's equity portfolio. Goldman also agreed to invest $125 million in future investment vehicles managed by Allied. Allied also sold a portfolio of venture capital and private equity fund interests.

On September 30, 2008, Allied Capital shares fell by more than half their value as Ciena Capital, one of its portfolio companies, filed for bankruptcy.

=== Sale to Ares Capital ===
In late 2009, Allied agreed to be purchased by Ares Capital. Prospect Capital submitted a competing bid in early 2010, but was rejected by Allied management. The sale to Ares was approved by shareholders on March 26, 2010, and was finalized on April 1 with Allied closing for the last time at $5 a share.
