= Villarriba and Villabajo =

Advertising campaign

Villarriba and Villabajo are two fictional Spanish villages that serve as the setting for a series of advertising campaigns for Procter & Gamble's Fairy brand. Originally created in Spain in 1991 for Fairy dishwashing liquid, the campaign has been renewed over the years, expanded to other products of the brand and used in several international markets.

== Development ==
Procter & Gamble introduced Fairy dishwashing liquid in Spain in 1982. In 1991, the advertising agency Grey Spain conceived for them an advertising campaign for the Spanish market focused on a television commercial in which two fictional towns, Villarriba and Villabajo, compete for the best paella at their popular fiestas. When it comes time to scrub the large paella pan, those from Villarriba, who use Fairy dishwashing liquid, finish quickly and leave early to celebrate, while those from Villabajo, who use another dishwashing liquid, cannot go to celebrate because they continue scrubbing the paella pan. The commercial ends with the slogan Fairy es el milagro antigrasa (transl. Fairy is the anti-grease miracle). The success of the campaign allowed the brand to go from a discreet 6% to 40% market share in Spain, surpassing Henkel's Mistol dishwashing liquid –the best-selling until then–, and managing to dominate the Spanish market.

The commercial was soon dubbed into other languages and used in markets such as Germany, Greece, the Netherlands, Portugal, Russia, and the United Kingdom, replacing the detergent bottle with the corresponding local one. In Germany itself, the campaign allowed Fairy to quickly become one of the country's three best-selling dishwashing liquids.

The advertising campaign has been renewed –and exported– many times over the years showing different fiestas in Villarriba and Villabajo –where they have to scrub different large pans or grills or wash a large number of dirty dishes–, it was expanded to other products of the brand –such as dishwasher detergent and laundry detergent– and it has even had local versions abroad –such as Neukirch and Altkirch in Germany or Vila de Cima and Vila de Baixo in Portugal–.

The location of Villarriba and Villabajo has never been revealed and does not maintain continuity between the different commercials, since they show different architectures, landscapes and fiestas. Actual locations used for filming include the towns of Brunete and Torrelaguna. To differentiate the fictional towns, the residents of Villarriba use Fairy's usual green color extensively at fiestas –in aprons, clothing, tablecloths, banners and decorations–, while those of Villabajo use blue. The name of the towns is a play on the Spanish word villa, meaning "town", the words arriba and abajo, meaning "up" and "down", and the words ¡arriba! and trabajo, meaning "come on!" and "work". For some time both towns were merged into Villaenmedio, from villa, meaning "town", and en medio, meaning "in the middle". In Villaenmedio they wear green and blue striped clothing at fiestas.

In 2016, Procter & Gamble –which is one of the largest advertisers in Spain– chose Villarriba and Villabajo as their best advertising campaign ever in the country given its popularity and excellent brand positioning results.

== Legacy ==
=== Television series ===
The television commercial was the inspiration for a Televisión Española comedy series titled Villarriba y Villabajo. For the television series, Villarriba and Villabajo are two bordering villages belonging to two different provinces in two different autonomous communities that form the same population center. The series was filmed in Colmenar de Oreja who was dressed up to represent both fictional towns, with the houses in Villarriba painted yellow and the houses in Villabajo painted blue. Procter & Gamble, which was not involved in the production of the series, gave the green light to the project in exchange for advertising space on the network.

=== World record ===
Following the idea of scrubbing large paella pans introduced in the Villarriba and Villabajo commercials, Procter & Gamble commissioned chef Antonio Galbis to break the world record for the largest paella as a publicity event. On 2 October 2001, in the Madrid district of Moratalaz, eighty cooks used 6,000 kilograms (13,000 lb) of rice, 5,500 kg (12,100 lb) of vegetables, 12,500 kg (27,600 lb) of meat, 195 kg (430 lb) of salt, 28 kg (62 lb) of spices, 1 kg (2.2 lb) of saffron threads, 30,000 kg (66,000 lb) of firewood, 15,000 litres (3,300 imp gal; 4,000 US gal) of water, and 1,100 L (240 imp gal; 290 US gal) of olive oil in a paella pan of 21.5 metres (71 ft) in diameter to prepare a paella that produced 110,000 portions that were eaten by those attending the event.

When they finished serving, they washed the paella pan with a single 1 litre (0.22 imp gal; 0.26 US gal) bottle of Fairy liquid, and an additional 16,621 dirty dishes with another 1 litre bottle. They released a subsequent television commercial featuring footage filmed at the event. They broke the previous world record for the largest paella established in 1992, and as of 2023, it has not been surpassed.
