= Ariangela Kozik =

American microbiologist

Ariangela J. Kozik
- Education: Calvin College (BS); Purdue University (PhD)
- Scientific career
- Fields: Microbiology
- Institutions: University of Michigan
- Thesis: The Impact of Host Variables and Tumor Necrosis Factor on the Gut Microbiome in a Mouse Model of Crohn's Disease (2018)

Ariangela J. Kozik is an American microbiologist, computational biologist, and science communicator. She is the co-founder and vice president of the Black Microbiologists Association and serves as an assistant professor in the Department of Molecular, Cellular, and Developmental Biology at the University of Michigan.

== Early life and education ==
Kozik developed an interest in microbiology during a fifth-grade science fair project on the antibacterial properties of dish soap. This experience led her to pursue a Bachelor of Science in biotechnology from Calvin College. Kozik then obtained her Ph.D. in comparative pathobiology from Purdue University, where her dissertation focused on the gut microbiome's role in inflammatory bowel disease.

== Career ==
After completing her Ph.D., Kozik undertook postdoctoral studies at the University of Michigan Medical School, funded by an NIH National Research Service Award fellowship. Her fellowship research focused on the relationship between the respiratory microbiome and asthma heterogeneity. She also pursued additional post-graduate training in personalized and genomic medicine at the University of Colorado Anschutz Medical Campus.

Kozik continued her research on microbial-immune interactions in adult asthma as a research investigator in pulmonary and critical care medicine at the University of Michigan, with a focus on precision medicine approaches. As an assistant professor in the Department of Molecular, Cellular, and Developmental Biology at the University of Michigan, her laboratory investigates host-microbe and microbe-microbe interactions within the human airway. Her research specifically examines the role of Prevotella bacteria and its contribution to respiratory health and disease. Her work explores the interactions between the microbiome, host immunity, and environmental factors, including the influence of social inequality on microbiome dynamics.

In 2020, Kozik and Kishana Taylor founded the Black Microbiologists Association (also known as Black in Microbiology), which aims to increase the visibility and representation of Black scientists within the field of microbiology.
