= Dishwashing =

Cleaning cooking items to prevent illness

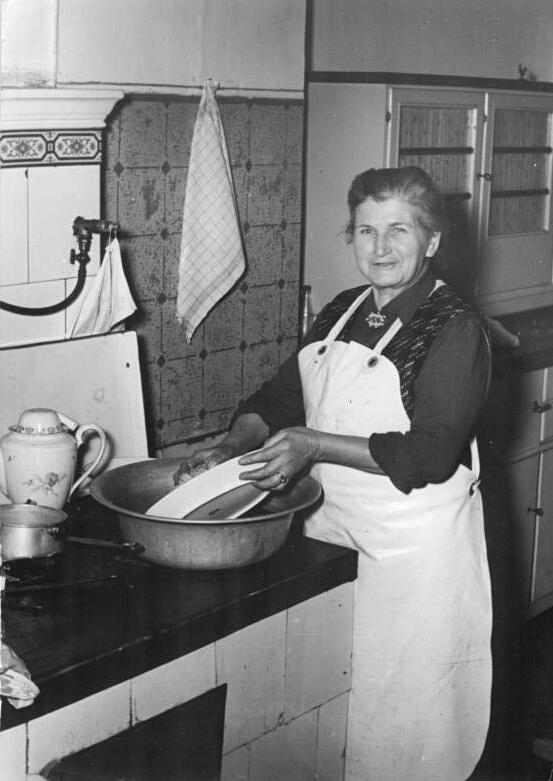
Handwashing dishes in Germany, 1951

Dishwashing, washing the dishes, doing the dishes, or (in Britain) washing up, is the process of cleaning food-soiled items, such as tableware and kitchen utensils. This hygiene practice has existed for centuries and helps to prevent foodborne illness. This is either done by hand in a sink (or tub), usually using tap water and cleaning agents (which may include a soap or detergent, degreaser, water softening agent, etc.) or, since the early 1900s, by using a dishwasher, a specialized appliance. Dishwashing may take place in a kitchen, utility room, scullery or outside. In commercial settings, dishwashing is generally done by a professional dishwasher.

== Tools and methods ==
Washing dishes by hand in the sink, United States, 2014

Dishwashing is usually done with a tool to scrub or scrape, as well as a soap or dishwashing detergent (which may include a detergent, degreaser, water softening agent, rinsing aide, and/or surfactants). Modern detergents include additions like lauryldimethylamine oxide (found in Joy). Some additives have been banned or restricted in some countries, like phosphates and triclosan. Before synthetic detergents were available, soap was often used alone with various locally available minerals, like citric acid, sodium bicarbonate and/or lime. In most middle and upper income countries, commonly used implements include cloths, sponges, brushes, plastic loofahs, or steel wool. In lower income nations, or in very rural areas, people may use their hands, sand, fibers like coconut brooms or jute, dried luffas, or rice husk, to act as an abrasive tool.

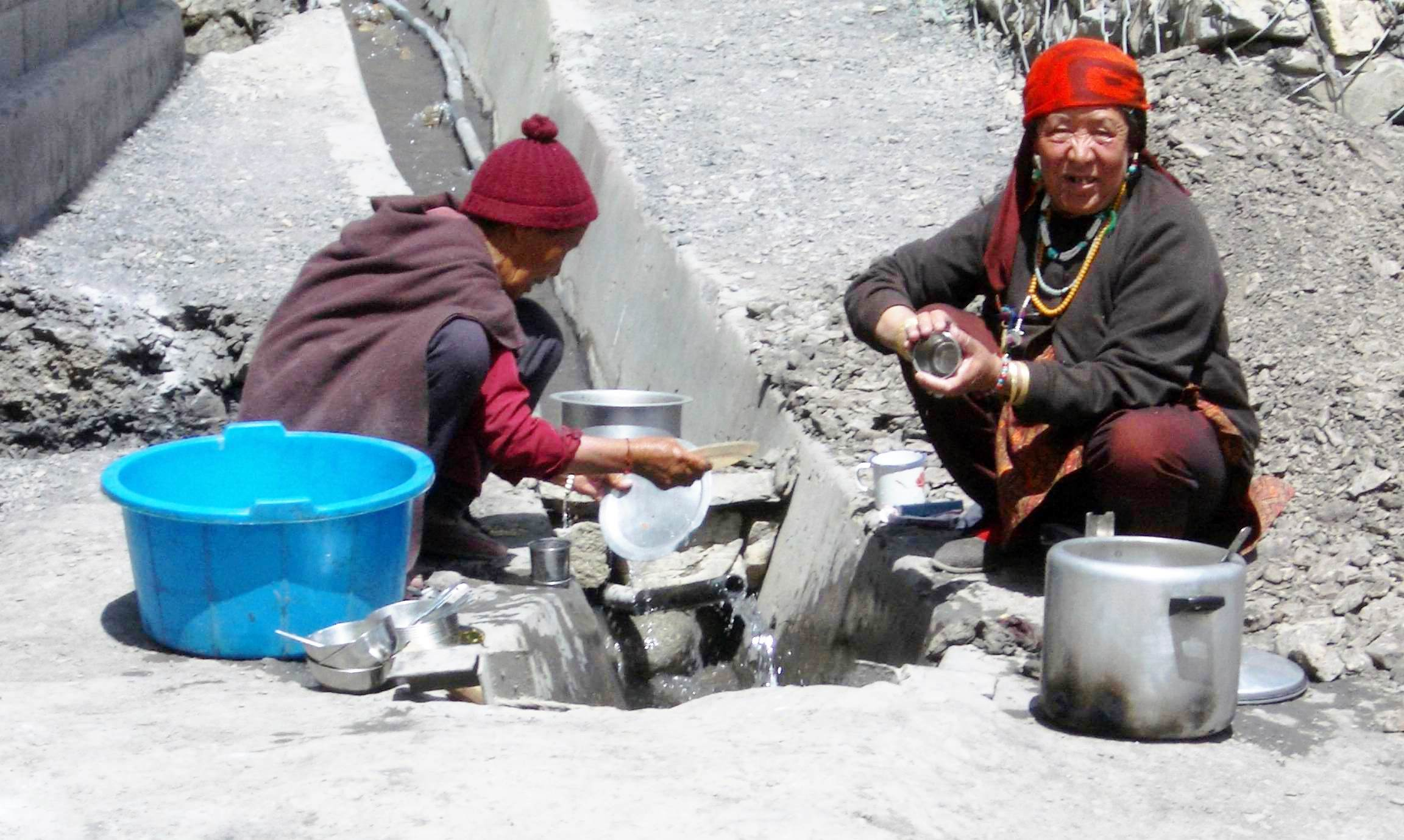
Nuns washing dishes. Key Monastery, Spiti, India. 2004

Rubber gloves are often worn when washing dishes by people who are sensitive to hot water or dish-washing liquids, those who do not want to touch the old food particles, or those who do not wish to get as wet or experience skin maceration. According to dermatologists, the use of protective gloves is highly recommended whenever working with water and cleaning products, since some chemicals may damage the skin, or allergies may develop in some individuals. Many people also wear aprons.

Techniques and methods vary greatly between individuals and countries. Variations include the temperature of water, method of application of soap, rinsing behavior (in the UK, hand-washing often excludes rinsing after washing and sometimes prefers air-drying to using a towel; in the US rinsing is typical, as is drying with a towel), method of drying, etc.

== Sanitization ==
In the United States and Mexico, many health codes require specialized sinks used for dishwashing in institutions to have three separated compartments. The first is used to hold and wash dirty dishes and utensils with detergent and water, which usually needs to be between 95 and 120 degrees Fahrenheit (35 and 49 °C) (according to applicable health codes). The second compartment is used to rinse dishes in clean running or standing water, and the last compartment is filled with a sanitizer. Dishes are submerged in the sanitizer and then removed to dry after an appropriate amount of time. Where dishes are to be shared among many, such as in restaurants, sanitization is necessary and desirable in order to prevent spread of microorganisms. Most institutions have a dish-washing machine which includes a sanitation cycle, consisting of a final rinse in either very hot water or a chemical sanitizing solution. Dishes are placed on large trays and fed onto rollers through the machine. Dishwashers typically exceed 145 °F (63 °C) and kill all germs, while hand-washing reaches temperatures of at most 104 °F (40 °C). In the case of food trucks or mobile food hand carts, solutions like diluted bleach (between 50-100 parts per million chlorine to provide sanitation) can be used to provide sanitation of utensils. However, bleach is less effective in the presence of organic debris, so a small amount of food residue can be enough to permit survival of bacteria like salmonella.

== Dishwashing appliances ==
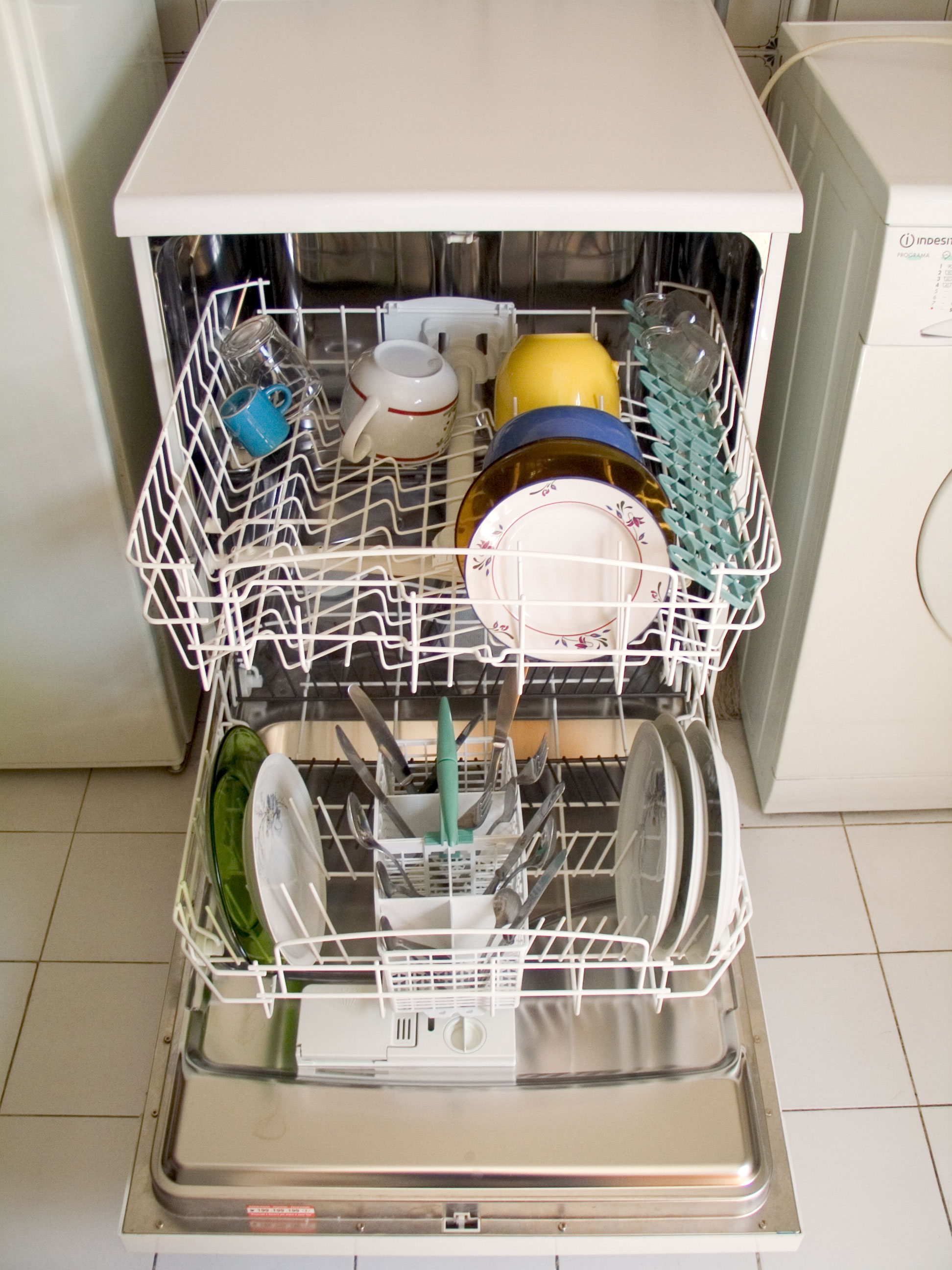
An open dishwasher

A dishwasher is a machine for cleaning dishware and cutlery automatically. Utilizing the Sinner's circle, modern mechanical dishwashers clean by spraying hot water, typically between 45 and 75 °C (110 and 170 °F), at the dishes (with lower temperatures used for delicate items) for longer periods of time (as opposed to manual wishing, which uses cooler water and more manual scrubbing).

A mix of water and dishwasher detergent is pumped to one or more rotating spray arms, blasting the dishes with the cleaning mixture. The mixture is recirculated to save water and energy, and can be improved with the use of a prewash. Often there is a pre-rinse, which may or may not include detergent, and the water is then drained. This is followed by the main wash with fresh water and dispensed detergent. Once the wash is finished, the water is drained, more hot water enters the tub by means of an electro-mechanical solenoid valve, and the rinse cycle(s) begin. After rinsing finishes the water is drained again, the dishes are dried using one of several drying methods. Typically a rinse-aid, a chemical to reduce surface tension of the water, is used to reduce water spots from hard water or other reasons.

In addition to domestic units, industrial dishwashers are available for use in commercial establishments such as hotels and restaurants, where many dishes must be cleaned. Washing is conducted with temperatures of 65–71 °C (149–160 °F) and sanitation is achieved by either the use of a booster heater that will provide an 82 °C (180 °F) "final rinse" temperature or through the use of a chemical sanitizer.

== In popular culture ==
- Dishwasher Pete, or Pete Jordan, is a fanzine author whose goal was to wash dishes in every state in the United States.
- The Dishwasher: Dead Samurai is an Xbox Live Arcade game in which the protagonist is an undead dishwasher.
- Dishdogz is a 2005 film about a boy working as a dishwasher during his summer break.
- In his book Down and Out in Paris and London by George Orwell, he describes his experience working as a dishwasher or plongeur in a French hotel in 1929. He describes the job, the interactions with other employees, and his thoughts on the place of a plongeur in society.
- There is a Western cultural cliché that restaurant patrons who can't pay the tab would instead work off their debt by washing dishes.
- The YouTube channel Technology Connections has produced several popular videos discussing the mechanics and design of dishwashers.
