= Dawn (brand) =

Brand of dishwashing liquid owned by Procter & Gamble

- Product type: Dishwashing liquid
- Current owner: Procter & Gamble
- Country: United States
- Introduced: 1973; 53 years ago
- Markets: North America, New Zealand
- Website: www.dawn-dish.com

Dawn is an American brand of dishwashing liquid owned by Procter & Gamble. Introduced in 1973, it is the best-selling brand of dishwashing liquid in the United States. Besides being used for dishwashing purposes, Dawn products are also used to remove grease from other items, such as animal fat spilled onto highways, and oil on animals, such as during the Exxon Valdez and Deepwater Horizon oil spills.

Dawn is also sold in Canada, Australia and Mexico (with the Salvo brand also sold in the latter). From 2000 to 2002, Dawn was sold in Germany, replacing the international Fairy brand. After sharply declining sales due to an unfamiliar brand, the Fairy brand was revived in 2002.

In 2019, Procter & Gamble announced Dawn Powerwash Dish Spray, a spray-activated foam with changes to ingredients (such as surfactants) designed to help break down grease and food residue without requiring an initial water soak.

== Philanthropy ==
Procter & Gamble has donated thousands of bottles of detergent to clean wildlife and has run advertisements that promote Dawn as the best product to use when cleaning animals that have been affected by oil spills such as ducks, penguins, dolphins, seals and sea lions. International Bird Rescue researched multiple cleaning agents, looking for one that would be "least traumatizing" and settled on a 10% solution of Dawn. The choice was the basis for Dawn's marketing and goodwill campaigns, including advertising and promotional donations tied to sales.
