= Villarriba y Villabajo =

Spanish television series (1994–95)

- Genre: Comedy
- Created by: Luis García-Berlanga; Jose Luis García-Berlanga; Antonio Oliver
- Based on: Villarriba and Villabajo
- Starring: Juanjo Puigcorbé; Ana Duato
- Composers: Carlos García-Berlanga; Juan Manuel Sueiro
- Country of origin: Spain
- Original language: Spanish
- No. of seasons: 1
- No. of episodes: 25

Production
- Production location: Colmenar de Oreja
- Production companies: Televisión Española; Gona TV
- Budget: 1.378 billion ₧

Original release
- Network: La Primera
- Release: 11 October 1994 – 28 June 1995

Villarriba y Villabajo is a Spanish television comedy series based on an advertising campaign for Fairy dishwashing liquid. It recounts the rivalries between two adjoining villages that are geographically united but administratively separated. The series premiered in prime-time on La Primera of Televisión Española on 11 October 1994, although it was later relegated to the late night slot.

== Premise ==
Villarriba and Villabajo (Note: The name of the towns is a play on the Spanish word villa, meaning town, and the words arriba and abajo, meaning up and down respectively.) are two –fictional– bordering villages belonging to two different provinces in two different autonomous communities that form the same population center. Being two different municipalities, each one has its own mayor, sheriff, holidays, and local laws but they share the urban center including the main square, the fountain and the bar, which are divided into two halves, one in each municipality. To differentiate the two towns, the houses in Villarriba are painted yellow and the houses in Villabajo are painted blue. Public services are also shared, while Villarriba provides the water supply, firefighters, lodging and the supermarket-brothel, Villabajo provides the electricity supply, the taxi, the cemetery and the pharmacy. All this, together with the rivalry between them, leads to many funny situations. The series follows the story of José Ulloa, a penniless man who comes to Villarriba to claim an inheritance and who ends up falling in love with Paulina, Villabajo's pharmacist.

== Production ==
=== Development ===
In 1991, Procter & Gamble launched a television advertising campaign in Spain for its Fairy dishwashing liquid in which two fictional towns, Villarriba and Villabajo, compete for the best paella at their popular fiestas. The campaign, which was a success, has been renewed many times over the years and was used in other markets such as the United Kingdom, Germany, Russia, Portugal and Greece.

José Luis García-Berlanga after directing one of these commercials, talked about the campaign with his father Luis García-Berlanga, who told him that it would be a great concept for a television series. He agreed with him and, together with Antonio Oliver, they created the plot of the series. With the first sketches they went to talk to Procter & Gamble, who, since they were interested in an exchange for advertising space with Televisión Española, approved the series. With this agreement they talked with Jordi García Candau, General Director of RTVE at the time, who immediately approved what would become Luis García-Berlanga's debut on television.

=== Filming ===
Filming took place over fourteen months in the town of Colmenar de Oreja (Madrid), with two units and in film stock. Each episode required ten ten-hour days. The town neighbors received 50,000 pesetas in exchange for letting their house be painted yellow or blue for the filming. Nearly a thousand residents worked as extras in the series, for which they received 6,000 pesetas for each day of filming.

The porticoed main square of the town was dressed up for the filming, one half was painted blue and the other yellow, a paper-mâché fountain was placed in its center, the two fictional town halls were installed in the public library building, and a dummy tavern was built on the opposite side. In addition, the shop signs of a dozen real businesses around the town were also modified.

== Cast ==
- Juanjo Puigcorbé as José Ulloa
- Ana Duato as Paulina
- Alfonso Lussón as Buenaventura
- Ángel de Andrés López as Mariano
- Rafael Alonso as Don Fidel
- Carlos Tristancho as Segundo
- Kiti Mánver as Nines
- María Isbert as Doña Deudora
- Fedra Lorente as Mabel
- Gemma Cuervo as Perpetua
- Antonio Gamero as Parrita
- María Elena Flores as Toñi
- Violeta Cela as Jessica
- Álex Angulo as Blas
- Mariola Fuentes as Pura
- Mónica Bardem as Virtudes
- Pilar Bardem as Doña Angustias
- Chus Lampreave as Suspiro

== Accolades ==
=== Actors and Actresses Union Awards ===
Year	Category	Recipient	Result	Ref.
1994	Best Television Lead Performance	Juanjo Puigcorbé	Won	

=== Fotogramas de Plata ===
Year	Category	Recipient	Result	Ref.
1994	Best Television Actor	Juanjo Puigcorbé	Won	
1994	Best Television Actress	Ana Duato	Nominated	

=== TP de Oro ===
Year	Category	Recipient	Result	Ref.
1992	Best Actor	Juanjo Puigcorbé	Nominated	
