= Fairy (brand) =

Brand of dishwashing liquid

- Product type: Dish detergent
- Current owner: Procter & Gamble
- Country: United Kingdom
- Introduced: 1898; 128 years ago
- Related brands: Dawn, Dreft, Yes and JAR
- Markets: United Kingdom, Ireland, France, Israel, Spain, Portugal, Poland, Germany and several other European markets, Australia, New Zealand and several other global markets.
- Previous owners: Thomas Hedley Co (until 1927)
- Website: UK and Ireland Fairy Products; France Fairy Products; Fairy Products Spain

Fairy is a brand of dishwasher detergent, owned by the American multinational consumer products company Procter & Gamble. The brand originated in the United Kingdom in 1898 and is now used on a number of P&G products in various markets.

It is closely related to the Dawn dishwashing product range sold in the US and to Dreft, Yes and JAR brands used by P&G in various European and international markets.

Fairy soap bars were originally manufactured by Newcastle upon Tyne company Thomas Hedley Co., which was acquired by Procter & Gamble in 1927.

== Other products ==
In the United Kingdom and Ireland, Fairy is also a longstanding brand of non-biological laundry detergent, the original soap-based variant being known as Fairy Snow. Fairy Non-Bio has added fabric-conditioner to its product range. Like Fairy dish detergents, its traditional trademark is a walking baby.

Fairy was also a brand of soap in those countries, characteristically green in colour and available both in the form of larger rectangular 155g blocks for laundry and other household purposes and in the smaller rounded 125g size as toilet soap, where it used the same "walking baby" trademark as the laundry powder and was marketed as a pure, mild product. It was suddenly discontinued by the manufacturers in about 2009 to the disapproval of its faithful customer base.

The Fairy brand has expanded further from the soap-based products, and is now also used on automatic dishwashing products, the latest being Fairy Active Bursts. These are pouches of powder and specially formulated washing-up liquid, specifically designed for domestic dishwashers. Other variants have included a power spray for cleaning pots and pans, and a foam/mousse.

== International market ==
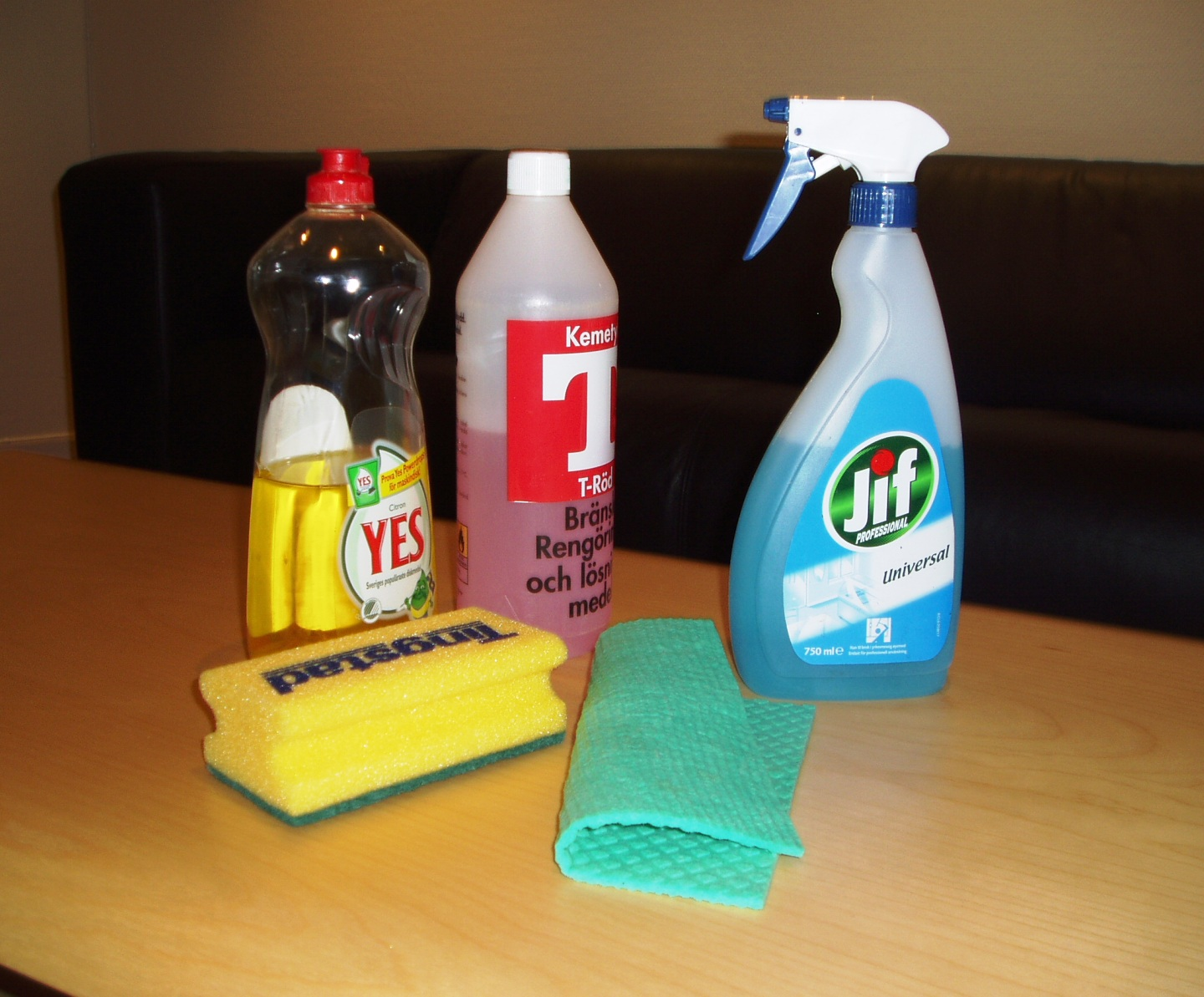
A bottle of Fairy Liquid, branded Yes in Sweden

- In Egypt, Fairy competes with Henkel's Pril, and takes second place to Pril in market share. It is notable for its aggressive advertising campaign featuring actresses from Egyptian television soap operas emphasizing its strength (which it claims is four times higher than Pril).
- Fairy is also sold in Germany: in 2000 it was briefly renamed Dawn (the brand used in the North American market), but, after sharply declining sales due to an unfamiliar brand, the Fairy name was revived in 2002.
- In Sweden and Norway, P&G premium dishwashing products are branded as Yes, as seen on the adjacent picture. It was introduced in 1961 and is by far the biggest-selling detergent in Sweden.
- In Belgium and the Netherlands the same product range is sold as Dreft. The same name also refers to another brand of detergent also made by Procter & Gamble.
- In Czechia, Slovakia, Hungary, Croatia and Slovenia similar P&G products are sold as Jar (pronunciation /yar/) and has been available since the 1960s. Its name comes from Janeček (then CEO of the company) and Ranný (the product inventor), The name became a synonymous for detergent in Czechia and Slovakia.
- In Saudi Arabia, it has been sold since the 1970s.
- Fairy products have been sold in Iran since 2005.
- Fairy dishwashing liquid was introduced in Spain in 1982. In 1991, a television advertising campaign in which two fictional towns, Villarriba and Villabajo, compete for the best paella at their popular fiestas was launched in the country. The campaign, which allowed the brand to go from a discreet 6% to 40% market share in Spain, has been renewed many times over the years, was used in other markets such as the United Kingdom, Germany, Russia, Portugal and Greece, and was even the inspiration for a television series titled Villarriba y Villabajo.

== See also ==
- Dawn - a similar dishwashing detergent produced by Procter & Gamble for the North American market.
- Persil (Unilever) - a rival brand of laundry detergent and dishwashing detergent
- de:Pril
