= Salvo (detergent) =

American laundry detergent

Salvo brand logo as of 2020

Salvo was an American laundry detergent of the mid 20th century. It was made in the form of large beveled discs of compressed powdered laundry detergent that could be chucked directly into the washing machine. It was the first such product, and thus the precursor of the detergent pods of the later 20th century and 21st century.

Salvo was launched by Procter & Gamble in the early or mid 1960s. It was not successful, due at least in part to the failure of the discs to entirely dissolve, and was discontinued in 1974.

The Salvo brand name continues to be used by Procter & Gamble, but for a dish detergent rather than a laundry detergent. This product was sold in the United States only 2004–2005, but (as of 2020) remains active in Latin America.
