= Laundry detergent pod =

Water-soluble pouches containing laundry product

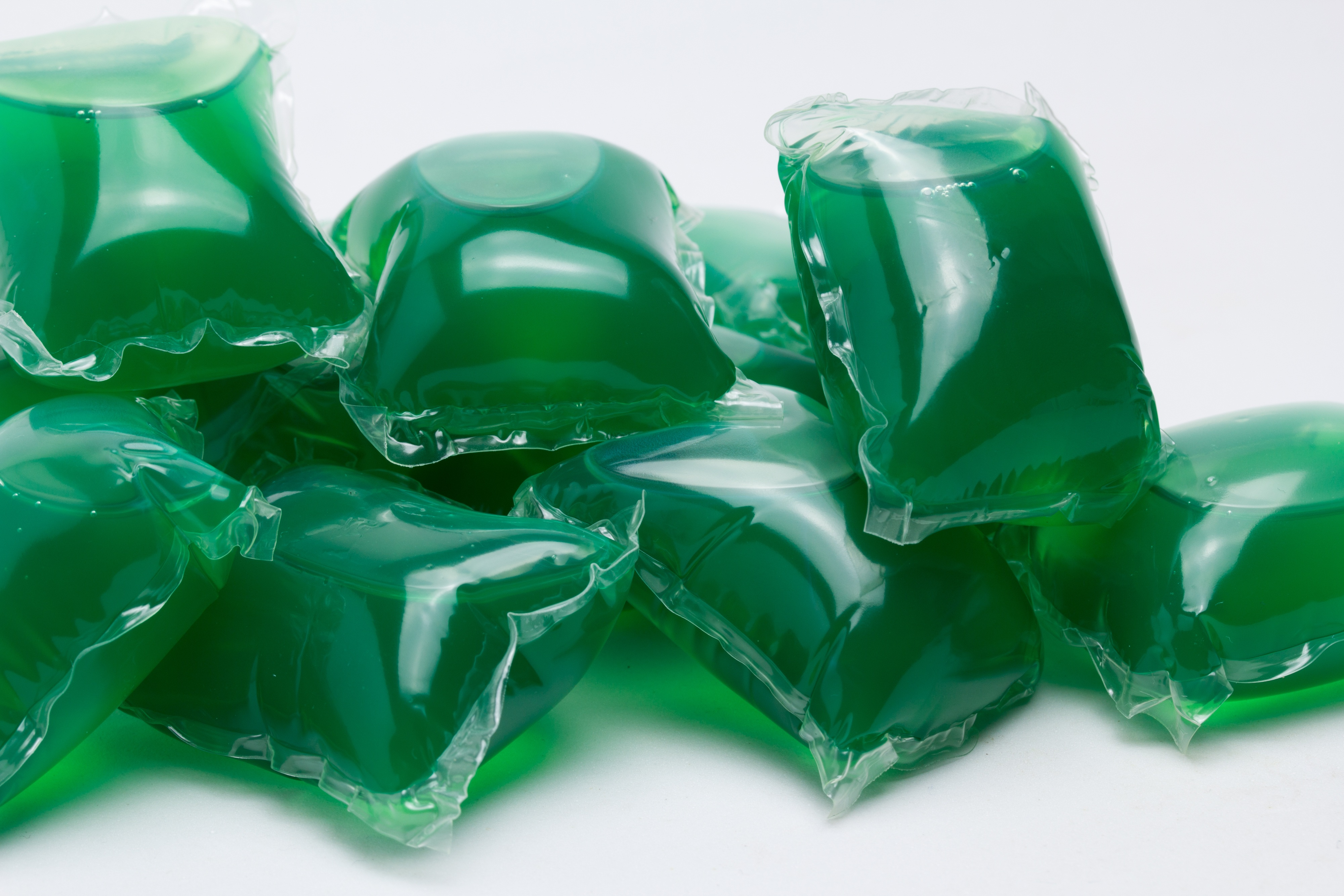
Laundry detergent pods

Laundry detergent pods (also called "packs" or "liquitabs") are water-soluble pouches containing highly concentrated laundry detergent, softener and other laundry products. They first became popular in February 2012 when they were introduced by Procter & Gamble as Tide Pods in the US (Ariel Pods in Europe and Latin America). Liquitabs were first launched in Europe in 2001.

The chemistry of laundry detergent packs is the same as in liquid detergents (including alkylbenzenesulfonates). The dissolvable packets are typically made of polyvinyl alcohol (PVA) or a derivative of PVA. Although the formulas are similar, the concentration varies; the liquid components of a detergent pod may contain 10% water compared to 50% in liquid detergents. The film is designed to be soluble in cold water. While PVA is water-soluble and technically biodegradable under specific conditions, it is estimated that close to 15,000 metric tons of intact PVA either bypass or make it through treatment facilities every year.

Laundry pods are estimated to make up about 15% of the US$7 billion-a-year U.S. laundry detergent market sales according to market researcher Nielsen N.V. Laundry pods were advertised as a way to reduce wasted use of powdered and liquid detergent by having precise measurements for a load. For large loads, most brands recommend two pods, with Tide suggesting up to three. Detergent pods cost significantly more than liquid detergent for equivalent laundry loads. MonoSol is one of the companies that develops the water-soluble film used for laundry and dishwasher detergent packs used by brands including Tide, with roughly US$250 million in annual sales and controlling around 90 percent of the market.

Notable brands of these packs include All, Arm & Hammer, Gain, Purex, Persil, Rinso and Tide.

== History ==
Laundry tabs were originally introduced in the 1960s in a compacted granular form (similar to an oral medical tablet), when Procter & Gamble launched Salvo tablets, later disappearing from the market in the 1970s. In the 1990s, Unilever and Henkel launched a similar laundry detergent pack product sold in Western Europe under the Persil brand. These products sometimes did not fully dissolve in United States washers. Powder Laundry Soluble Sachets were first marketed in the UK and Europe in 1998 as Soapy Sacks and shortly thereafter rebranded as Aquados and received a Millennium Award for the innovation. The first powder dishwasher soft-tabs were then sold in Europe in the early 2000s under the Simply brand name. Liquitabs were launched in 2001 in Europe (spelt as 'liqui-tabs' or 'écodoses' in different countries).

In 2005, Cot’n Wash, Inc., introduced liquid unit dose laundry pods under the Dropps brand.

In 2012, Procter & Gamble launched a liquid tablet product as Tide Pods.

In 2017, the Tide Pod challenge emerged, causing concern about laundry detergent pod poisoning.

== Standard Safety Specification for Liquid Laundry Packets ==
In November 2012, a Safety Alert was issued by the U.S. Consumer Product Safety Commission (CPSC) to inform parents and caregivers that liquid laundry detergent packets need to be kept away from children. The alert warned that children exposed to packet contents are at risk of "serious injury and even death" due to the highly concentrated nature of the product.

The Standard Safety Specification for Liquid Laundry Packets by the ASTM provides requirements for household liquid laundry detergent packet safety to reduce unintentional exposures to the contents of the packets, especially to children.

Product innovations In late 2015, ASTM International developed voluntary standards for product manufacturers to reduce unintentional exposures to liquid laundry detergent packets in children by enhancing overall product safety. These changes included specifications for safe manufacturing that suggested liquid laundry detergent packet packaging must be easy to close in one motion and meet one or more of the following safety requirements and features:

- Test criteria for being child-resistant
- Opening force greater than a child could provide
- Hand dexterity greater than that of an average-sized child to open
- Bitter-tasting film
- Delayed dissolution film
- Squeeze resistant packet
- Warning information, safety icons, and first aid instructions

In 2021, an evaluation of 2012-2020 data from the National Poison Data System (NPDS) was conducted to describe the characteristics of exposures to liquid laundry detergent packets in the context of the ASTM changes. The results found that while a total of 94,610 unintentional-general exposures involving liquid laundry detergent packets and children of six years and younger were reported NPDS from 1 July 2012, through 31 December 2020, unintentional exposures initially increased from 2012-2016. This correlates to the introduction of liquid laundry detergent packets in the U.S. at a time when the ASTM safety standards were still in initial development and implementation.

A succeeding decrease was correlated with the period at which full adoption of the ASTM safety standard had been achieved (2017 to 2020), suggesting that the ASTM safety standard was a contributor to decreasing unintentional pediatric exposures to liquid laundry detergent packets. A substantial decrease in the morbidity of unintentional pediatric exposures was also observed following adoption of the ASTM standard. In May 2021, an additional study was conducted using 2012-2018 data that looked at accidental exposures to liquid laundry packets in children <6 years old to determine the overall impact of product safety changes and how they affect children's safety. The results concluded a 90.9% decrease in exposures per every 1 million packets sold.

Also in 2021, an evaluation of 2012-2017 data from Poison Control Centers was conducted to determine the impact of the voluntary safety standards for liquid laundry packets on children exposure rates reported to the Poison Control Centers in the United States. The results found that the voluntary safety standard was associated with a 28.6% reduction in the rate of total reported exposures and a 36.8% reduction in the rate of medically treated exposures. The analysis concluded that the implementation of the voluntary safety standards significantly reduced children’s rate of injury when it comes to accidental exposures involving liquid laundry packets.

== Poisonings ==
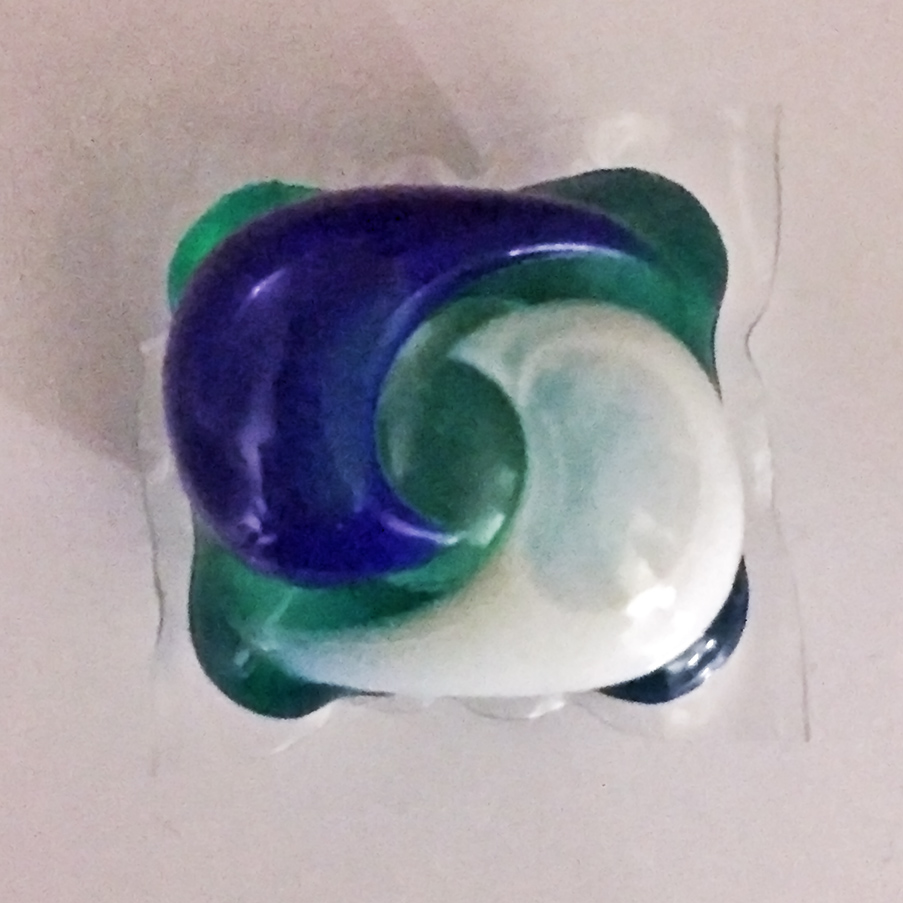
"Spring Meadow" Tide Pod, a brand of detergent criticized for its colorful candy-like appearance

A safety symbol that alerts parents to keep laundry packs out of reach of children

Concern has been raised over children accidentally being exposed to laundry packs, as its appearance and the packaging design can have the same appeal to a child as hard candy with patterned designs, and be confused as such.

In 2012, in response to a child swallowing Tide Pods, Procter & Gamble said they would make this product more difficult to open by adding a double latch to the lid, and has also re-focused their advertising to make clear the product should be out of a child's reach at all times. The packaging was also changed to an opaque orange rather than the original clear plastic gumball machine-type presentation to make them look less enticing; other manufacturers followed suit with equivalent packaging changes. In 2013, Consumer Reports stated that there had been nearly 7,700 reported incidents in which children age 5 or younger had been exposed to laundry packs, and that year, one child from Florida died after ingesting a pack. In 2014, a study published in Pediatrics found that from 2012 to 2013, more than 17,000 calls were made to poison control centers about children who had been exposed to the packs. Despite the industry's move toward safer packaging, a 2017 study published in JAMA Ophthalmology found that between 2012 and 2015, the number of chemical eye burns associated with laundry detergent pods among 3-to 4-year-old children skyrocketed from fewer than 20 to almost 500 per year; in 2015, these injuries were responsible for 26% of all chemical eye burns among this population.

In late 2017 and early 2018, a viral Internet trend, called the "Tide Pod challenge" emerged, in which participants deliberately and intentionally ingested detergent pods, in some cases filming the consumption of the detergent and the aftermath. Several children and teens have been injured, some severely, from this intentional consumption.

Since 2019 the International Mandatory action sign "Keep out of reach of children" is available to inform adults that these items must be kept out of the reach of children.
