= Chemical eye injury =

- Other names: Chemical burns to the eye
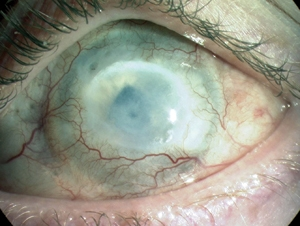
- An alkali burn to the human cornea can cause ocular surface failure with neovascularisation, opacification and blindness resulting from LESC deficiency.
- Specialty: Ophthalmology

Chemical eye injury are due to either an acidic or alkali substance getting in the eye. Alkalis are typically worse than acidic burns. Mild burns will produce conjunctivitis while more severe burns may cause the cornea to turn white. Litmus paper is an easy way to rule out the diagnosis by verifying that the pH is within the normal range of 7.0—7.2. Large volumes of irrigation is the treatment of choice and should continue until the pH is 6–8. Local anesthetic eye drops can be used to decrease the pain.

If available, check the chemical itself with a pH test strip. For example, some non-alkaline batteries may be marked “R03” (IEC name) or similar; zinc-carbon batteries can have a pH below 7. However, the pH measured in the eye may be higher for other reasons and does not always directly reflect the pH of the original chemical.

== Epidemiology ==
In the United States, chemical eye injuries most commonly occur among working-age adults. A 2016 analysis of emergency department visits from 2010 to 2013 reported over 36,000 visits annually for chemical burns to the eye, with a median age at presentation of 32 years. By individual year of age, 1- and 2-year-old children have the highest incidence of these injuries, with rates approximately 50% higher than the highest-risk adult group (25 years), and 13 times higher than the rate among 7-year-olds. Further research identified laundry detergent pods as a major source of injury among small children.
