= Tide Pods =

Brand of laundry detergent pods under the Tide brand

- Logo of the Tide brand
- Product type: Laundry detergent pod
- Current owner: Procter & Gamble
- Country: United States
- Introduced: February 2012; 14 years ago
- Related brands: Tide
- Markets: International (but not worldwide)

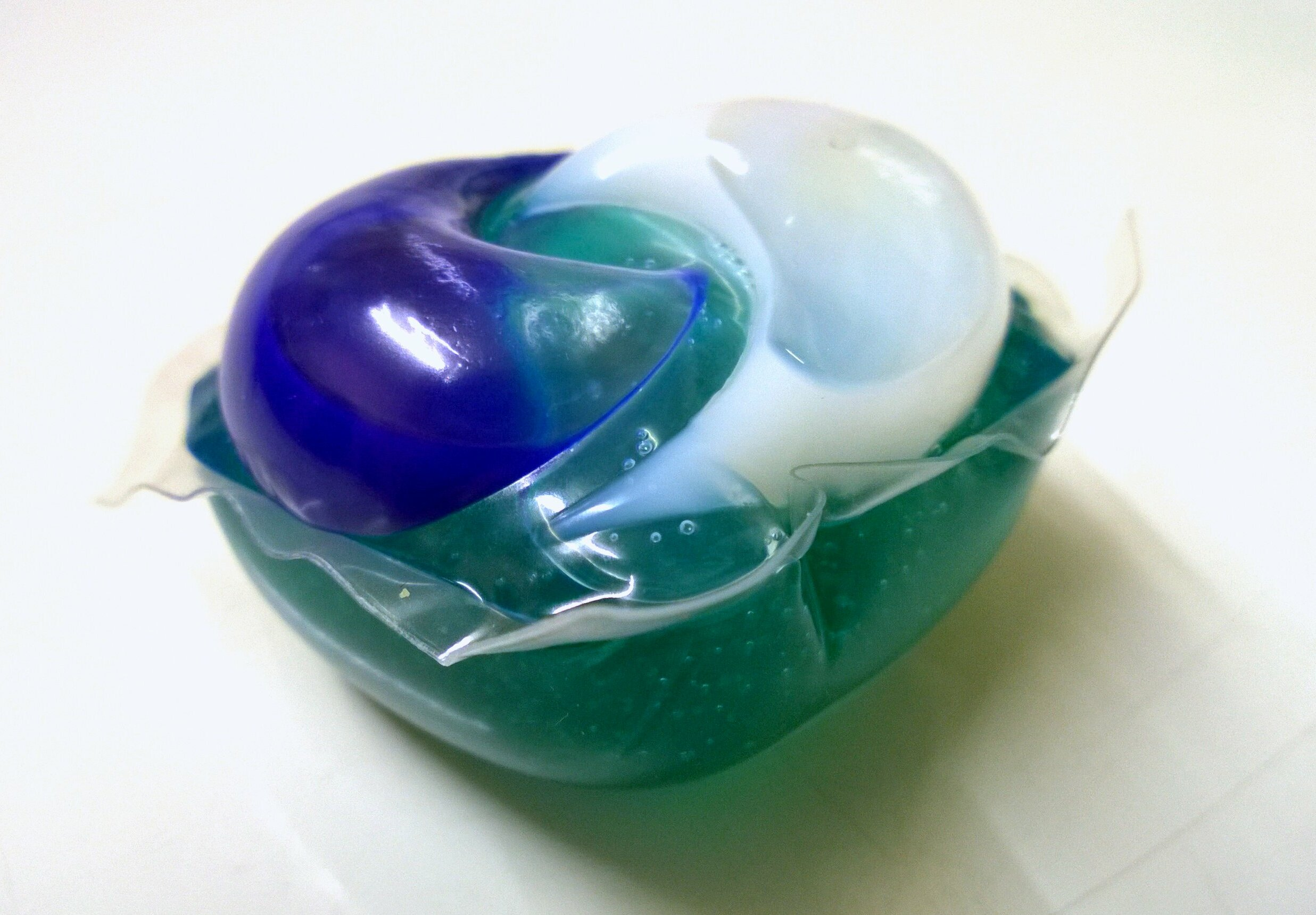
An individual Tide Pod

Tide Pods (stylized Tide PODS) are a line of laundry detergent pods from Procter & Gamble under the Tide brand.

== History ==
Procter & Gamble originally created laundry pods when they launched Salvo powder detergent tablets in 1960, which later disappeared from the market in 1978. In September 2000, Proctor and Gamble released Tide Rapid Action Tablets, which were filled with powder detergent. Tide Tabs had a tendency to not dissolve completely and worked only in hot water, which led to the product being discontinued in 2002.

Development of Tide Pods began in 2004 and reportedly involved over 75 employees and 450 packaging and design sketches. The film in Tide Pods is a polyvinyl alcohol film developed by MonoSol, which is intended to dissolve in any temperature water. The pod detergent is also 10 percent water by volume compared to liquid Tide detergent, which is 50 percent water by volume. This was done to prevent the pod from melting from having a high water volume. Tide Pods have three chambers, which contain a cleanser, brightener, and fabric softener. The chambers are used to keep each part separated until the pod dissolves in water.

In 2012, Procter & Gamble launched Tide Pods with a $150 million ad campaign, which included a television ad at the 84th Academy Awards. The product was very successful in its first year following its launch, with sales of around $500 million in North America and a 75% market share in the single-dose laundry packet market.

== Consumption ==
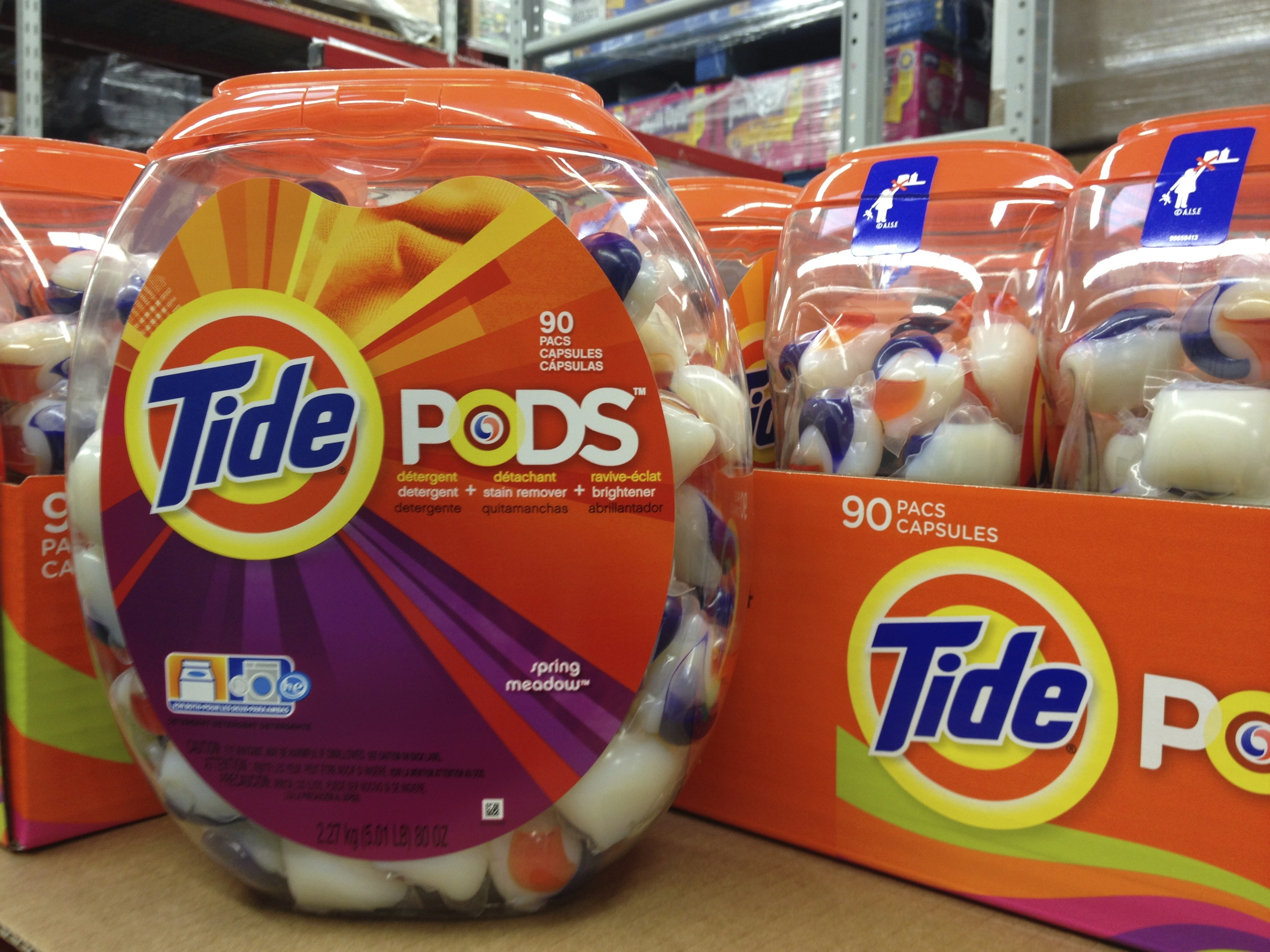
A transparent container of Tide Pods from 2012. The plastic container was later made opaque to reduce the chance of the product being mistaken for candy.

Concern has been raised over children and elderly people with dementia accidentally consuming Tide Pods, as its appearance and packaging design can have the same appeal to a child as hard candy with patterned designs, and be confused as such. In 2012, in response to a child swallowing Tide Pods, Procter & Gamble said they would make this product more difficult to open by adding a double latch to the lid, and have also re-focused their advertising to make clear the product should be out of a child's reach at all times. The packaging was also changed to an opaque orange rather than the original clear plastic gumball machine-type presentation to make them look less enticing.

Ingestion of pods can lead to death in some cases.

=== "Tide Pod Challenge" ===
Beginning in late 2017 a viral Internet trend, called the "Tide Pod Challenge", emerged on X (formerly Twitter) and various other social media websites, in which participants intentionally ingest detergent pods. Several children and teens have been injured, some severely, from this intentional consumption. The challenge (and subsequent meme) were popularized on X and several people have eaten Tide Pods on camera. One company began making edible replica "pods" and several internet personalities have posted about making edible "Tide Pods".

Tide later partnered with American football player Rob Gronkowski, having him issue the message: "What the heck is going on, people? Use Tide Pods for washing. Not eating. Do not eat."
