= Dreft =

Laundry detergent

- Product type: Synthetic detergent
- Current owner: Procter & Gamble
- Country: United States
- Introduced: 1933; 93 years ago
- Related brands: Ivory Snow (Canada)
- Website: dreft.com

Dreft is a laundry detergent in the United States, Canada, United Kingdom and other markets. First produced by Procter & Gamble in 1933, it was the first synthetic detergent. The Fairy brand of washing-up liquid and Cascade brand of dishwasher detergent are also sold under the name "Dreft" in some countries, including the Netherlands and Belgium. In Canada, the laundry detergent is sold under the brand name Ivory Snow.

== Technology ==
Synthetic detergents represented an improvement in laundry washing because these synthetic materials are less susceptible to hard water. The commercial availability of fatty alcohols opened the way for the production of the related organosulfate derivatives. In Germany, BASF started selling FeWA, and Dreft was introduced in Germany the following year.

== Marketing ==
By 1947, Dreft dishwashing detergent was released. Since the 1940s, hypoallergenic formulations of Dreft ("Dreft Stage 1" and "Dreft Stage 2") have been advertised as an ideal laundry detergent for washing baby linens. The slogan for Dreft is "For a Clean You Can Trust". It is generally marketed to mothers of newborns.

== See also ==
- Fairy
