= Finish (detergent) =

Brand of cleaning products

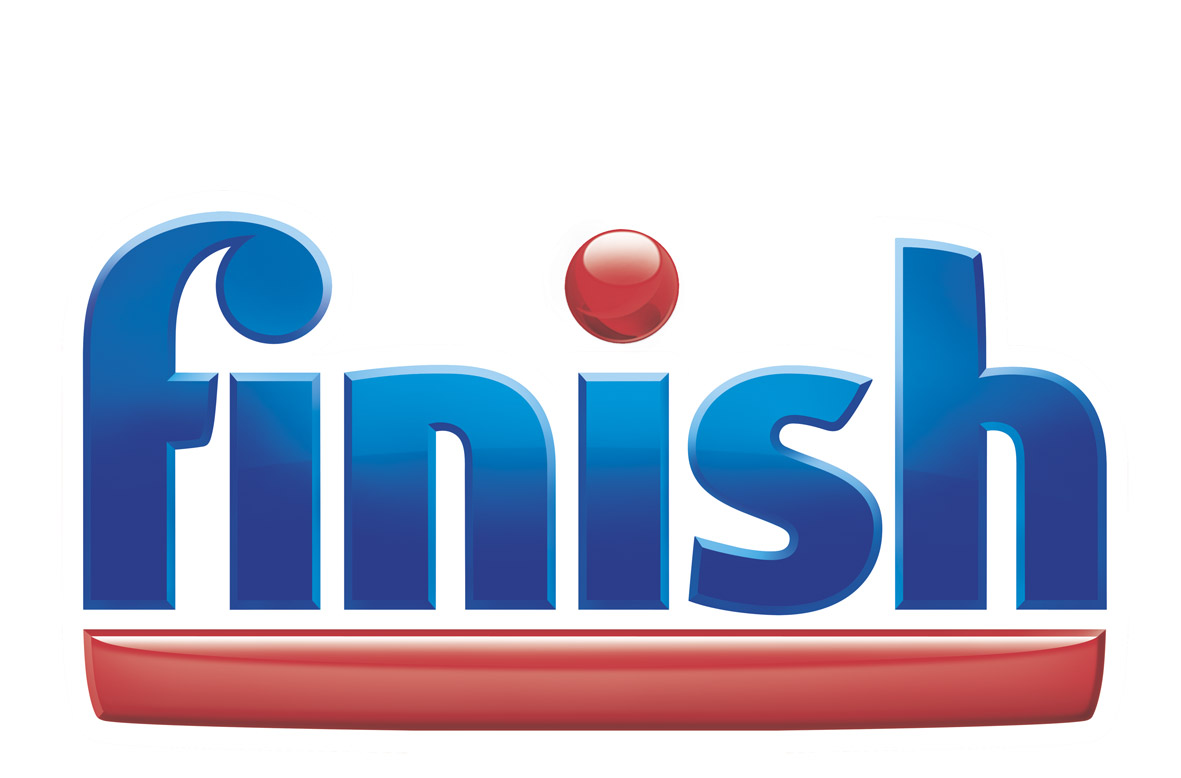
- Product type: Dishwasher detergent Cleaning agent
- Current owner: Reckitt Benckiser
- Introduced: 1953; 73 years ago
- Markets: Global
- Previous owners: Economics Laboratory
- Website: www.finishdishwashing.com

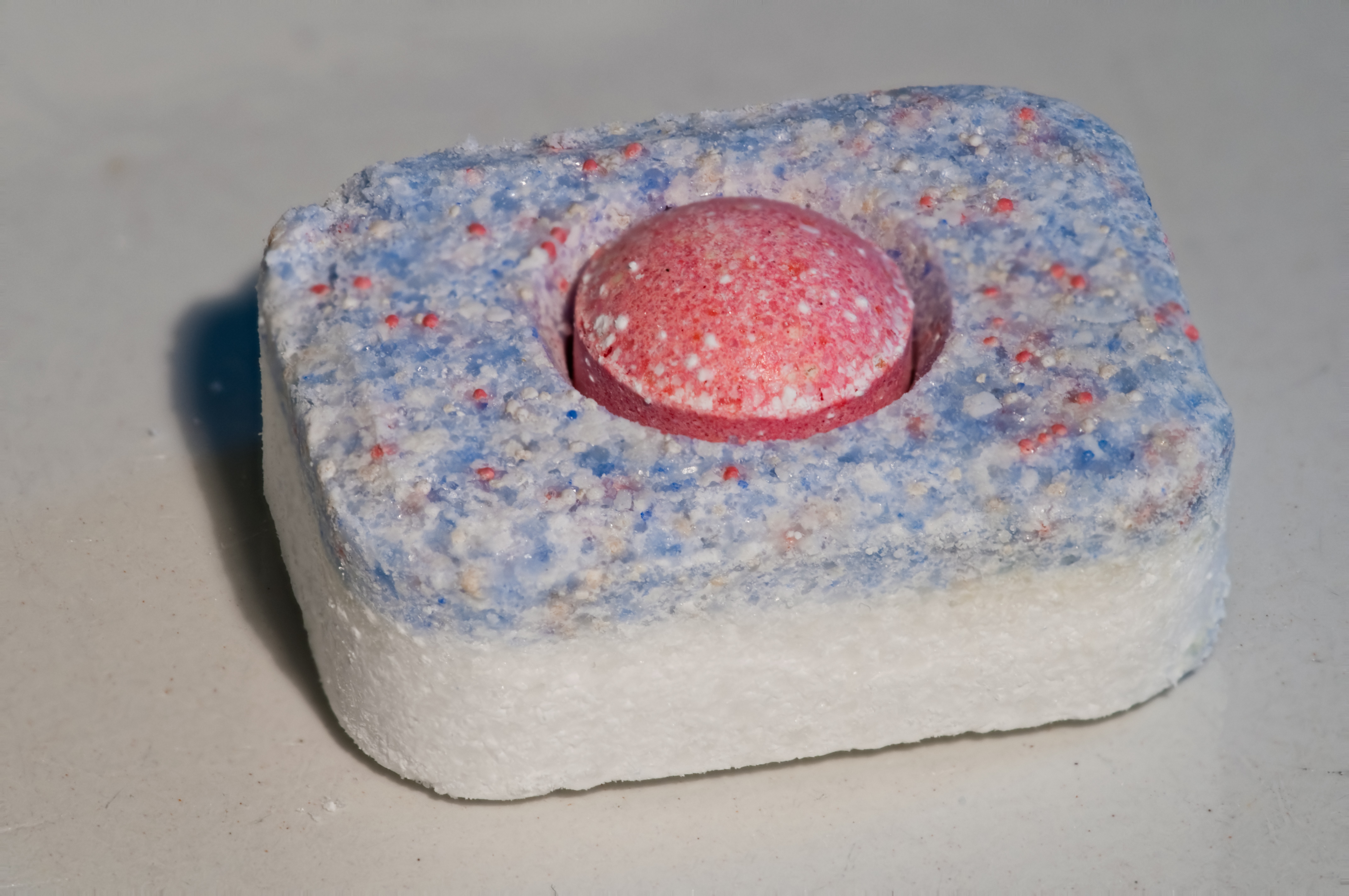
Finish detergent tablet

Finish is the brand name of a range of dishwasher detergent and cleaning agents sold by the British-Dutch company Reckitt Benckiser. The tablets, based on the original product, contain surfactants that counteract water hardness, break down foods containing starches and proteins, remove bleachable stains and produce enzymes and foams. The product is specially designed for dishwashers. Prior to 2009, the product was known as Electrasol in North America, and as Calgonit in some European countries.

== History ==
In the early 1950s, the increased use of molded plastic dinnerware posed a number of problems. The Finish brand was created in 1953 by the American company Economics Laboratory (now Ecolab). Taking advantage of research into the needs of the dairy and food industry, the company launched two new products for the household dishwashing machine in 1953, namely mass-market product Electrasol and premium product Finish. Later, in 1969, they introduced the first biological powder.

J. A. Benckiser (later Reckitt Benckiser) acquired the Consumer Products division of Ecolab Inc. in 1987. In 1995, the first two-ply powder tablet was introduced; in 1999, the red Powerball capsule; in 2008, the Finish Quantum, and the first, three-chamber, molded capsule. Circa 2009, all Electrasol products were rebranded under the Finish label.

== See also ==
- List of renamed products
