= Kishana Taylor =

Kishana Yvonne Taylor
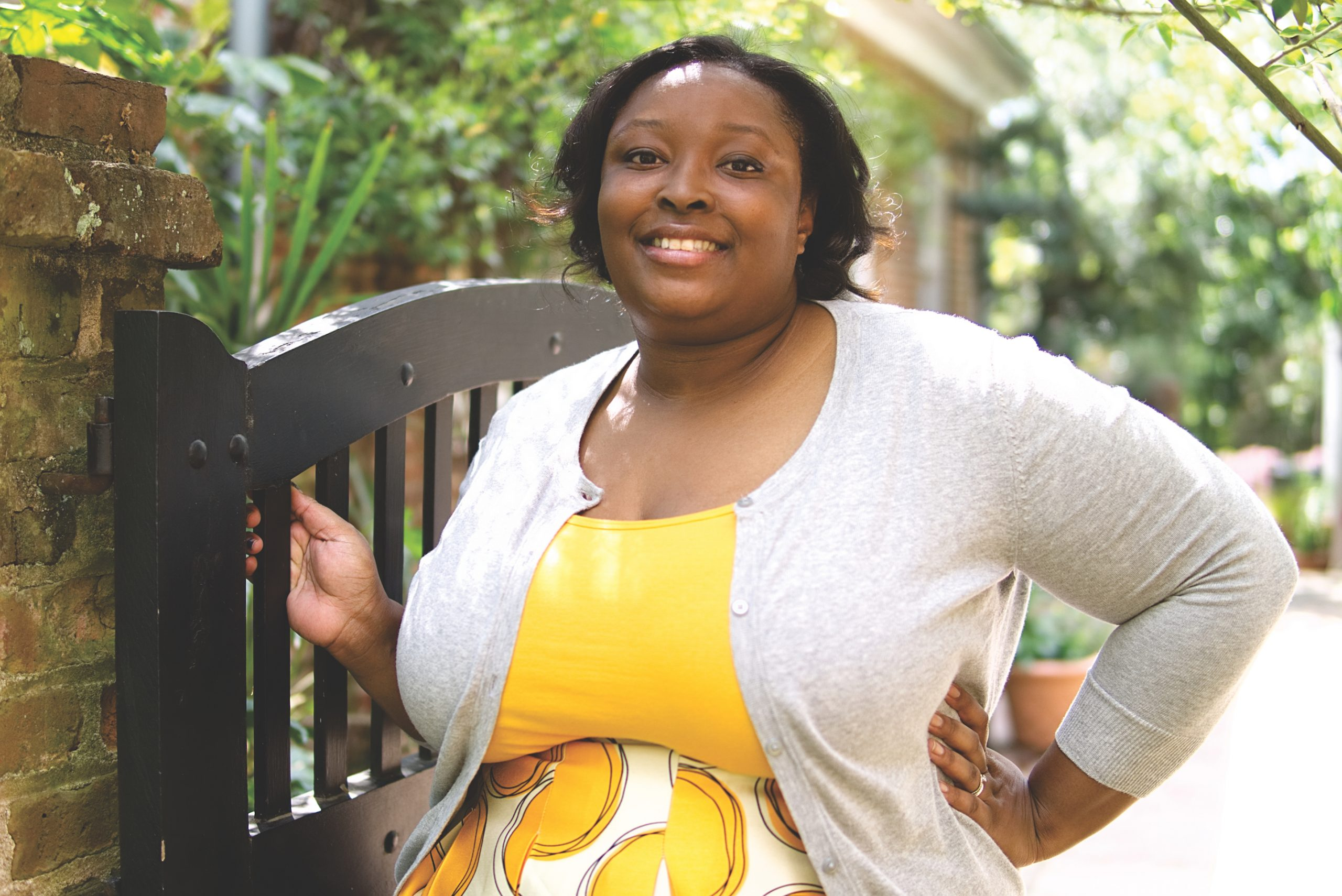
- Born: 1987 or 1988 (age 37–38)
- Education: University of Delaware (BS); The George Washington University (MS); University of Georgia (PhD)
- Scientific career
- Fields: Virology
- Institutions: Carnegie Mellon University; Rutgers University; University of California, Davis; Towson University
- Thesis: The development of a laboratory transmission model for north american epizootic hemorrhagic disease viruses (2018)
- Doctoral advisor: David Stallknecht

Kishana Yvonne Taylor is an American virologist, academic, and co-founder of the Black Microbiologists Association.

== Early life and education ==
Kishana Taylor's interest in science began in childhood. Films such as "Flipper" and "Free Willy" fostered an early fascination with dolphins and other cetaceans. Her early interest in dolphins initially led her to want to become a veterinarian; however, exposure to various scientific fields ultimately led her to pursue microbiology instead.

Taylor earned her Bachelor of Science degree in animal science from the University of Delaware in 2011. She then pursued a Master of Science degree in public health microbiology and emerging infectious diseases at the George Washington University, completing it in 2013. Her master's thesis examined the effects of confined poultry feeding operations on the discharge of antimicrobial-resistant pathogenic E. coli and nutrients from watersheds. After completing her master's degree, she attended the University of Georgia and obtained her Ph.D. in interdisciplinary biomedical science in 2018. She completed her doctoral dissertation under the direction of David Stallknecht and focused on the development of a laboratory model to study the transmission of epizootic hemorrhagic disease viruses.

== Career ==
Following the completion of her Ph.D. at the University of Georgia in 2018, Taylor pursued a series of postdoctoral positions. She began her postdoctoral career at the University of California, Davis, working in the Department of Microbiology and Molecular Genetics until August 2020. She then held a postdoctoral researcher role in Biomedical Engineering at Carnegie Mellon University from August 2020 to May 2021, focusing on viral evolution and the role of monocytes in severe COVID-19. In May 2021, Taylor joined Rutgers University as a postdoctoral associate in the Department of Earth and Environmental Sciences. Her research at Rutgers involves studying vector-borne viruses and pandemic preparedness with a focus on social-justice and equity-centered approaches. She joined Towson University as an assistant professor in 2024. Taylor teaches microbiology and researches the evolution and eco-epidemiology of emerging and reemerging viral pathogens, develops mitigation strategies, and their implications for health equity.

In 2020, Taylor and Ariangela Kozik founded the Black Microbiologists Association (also known as Black in Microbiology) to address the underrepresentation of Black scientists in microbiology and to support their professional development. The Black Microbiologists Association works to nationally and internationally connect Black microbiologists to research symposiums, educational course opportunities and other career development opportunities with the hopes of providing academic scholarships for Black students looking to pursue microbiology.
