= List of renamed products =

This is a list of renamed or repositioned products.

== Renamed products ==
- In France, Danones yogurt Bio changed to Activia on January 16, 2006, because of EU regulations on organic agriculture.
- 7 Up had used a lot of names over the past. It started off as SEVEN-UP, and then "7up Lithiated Lemon Soda", then finally "7 Up".
- Coco Pops (as it is known in the United Kingdom) took the name used in the rest of Europe, Choco Krispies in 1998, before changing back to the original brand of Coco Pops in 1999.
- Coon cheese was rebranded Cheer cheese in 2020 by Saputo Inc due to pressure raised by the Black Lives Matter campaign
- Darkie toothpaste was renamed Darlie in 1988. The Chinese name of the brand, "黑人牙膏" (English: "Black Person Toothpaste"), was changed to "好來" (a phonetic translation of Hawley, also meaning "Good things will come") in 2021.
- The Interbank credit card became Master Charge in 1969, which became MasterCard in 1979.
- Jif cleaning products (as it was known in the United Kingdom) became Cif in 2000.
- Lilt became 'Fanta Pineapple & Grapefruit' in 2023.
- Marathon (as it was known in the United Kingdom) became Snickers in 1990
- Nestlé Quik (as it was known in the United States) took the European name Nesquik.
- Oil of Ulay (as it was known in the United Kingdom) became Olay in 1999.
- Opal Fruits (as it was known in the United Kingdom) became Starburst in 1998.
- "Purple Pill" anti-heartburn medication was Prilosec (omeprazole magnesium) until 2001, when the patent ran out and the Purple Pill name was switched to Nexium (esomeprazole magnesium). This is a case of evergreening.
- Raider as it was known in most of Europe became Twix in 1991. Sales immediately plummeted.
