= Tide (brand) =

Brand-name of a laundry detergent manufactured by Procter & Gamble

- Product type: Laundry detergent
- Current owner: Procter & Gamble
- Country: United States
- Introduced: 1946; 80 years ago
- Related brands: Tide Pods; Ace ( Puerto Rico and Latin America except Ecuador and Panama); Alo (Turkey); Vizir (Poland)
- Markets: Worldwide
- Website: www.tide.com

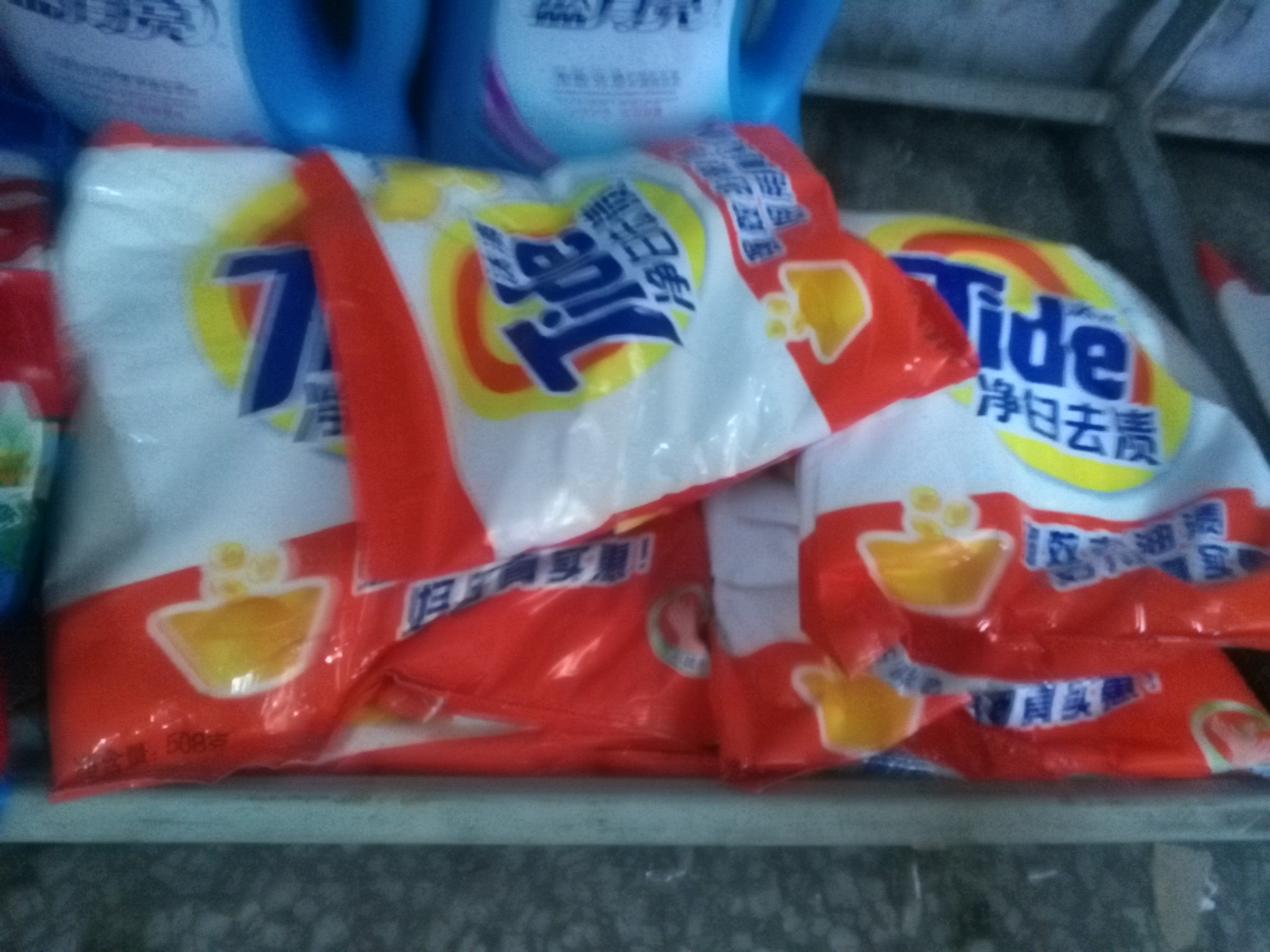
Tide products in mainland China

Tide (/ˈtaɪd/; TYDE) is an American brand of laundry detergent manufactured and marketed by Procter & Gamble. Introduced in 1946, it is the highest-selling detergent brand in the world, with an estimated 14.3 percent of the global market.

== History ==
=== Background ===
The household chore of doing the laundry began to change with the introduction of washing powders in the 1880s. These new laundry products were pulverized soap. New cleaning-product marketing successes, such as the 1890s introduction of the N. K. Fairbank Company's Gold Dust washing powder (which used a breakthrough hydrogenation process in its formulation), and Hudson's heavily advertised product, Rinso, proved that there was a ready market for better cleaning agents. Henkel & Cie's "self-activating" (or self bleaching) cleaner, Persil; (introduced in 1907); the early synthetic detergent, BASF's Fewa (introduced in 1932); and Procter & Gamble's 1933 totally synthetic creation, Dreft (marketed for use on infant-wear) —all indicated significant advances in the laundry cleaning product market.

Throughout the 1930s, Procter & Gamble's chemists and chemical engineers worked to develop a heavy-duty synthetic laundry detergent. The main challenge, known as the surfactant-builder problem, was creating an alkyl sulfate-based detergent that cleaned heavily soiled clothes without making them stiff or coarse. After 7 years, the company's research efforts had been largely unsuccessful, and the project, known as Project X, was cancelled. However, chemist David "Dick" Byerly continued the work surreptitiously. He experimented with various builders, such as sodium pyrophosphate, which cleaned effectively but left fabrics feeling rough. By 1941, Byerly concluded that the optimal builder was sodium tripolyphosphate, which, when used in a high ratio to the surfactants (such as alkyl sulfates and alkylbenzenesulfonates), cleaned without causing harshness. This discovery made it possible for detergents to work effectively in washing machines, even in hard water. By 1945, Byerly's work had progressed to a point where his supervisors, including Thomas Halberstadt, felt confident enough to present the project to senior management.

=== Commercialization ===
Tide was first introduced in U.S. test markets in 1946 as the world's first heavy-duty detergent, with nationwide distribution accomplished in 1949. Tide claimed it was "America's Washday Favorite". Authority was quickly gained in the U.S. detergent market, dwarfing the sales of Ivory Snow and accelerating the demise of two of its main competing products, Rinso and Gold Dust Washing Powder, both then Lever Brothers brands. These other brands came in the more familiar soap-powder and soap-flake forms. Tide, however, came shaped like a white powdered bead and was originally marketed as a multi-use product, with its packaging claiming it could be used for both "cleaner clothes, sparkling dishes". Procter & Gamble, Tide's manufacturer, later released Cascade in 1955 to create a specialized product for dishwashing that left dishes shinier.

In 2006, the development of Tide was designated an ACS National Historic Chemical Landmark in recognition of its significance as the first heavy-duty synthetic detergent.

As of January 2013, Tide had more than 30% of the liquid-detergent market, with more than twice as much in sales as the second-most-popular brand Gain, although it costs about 50% more than the average liquid detergent.

For the company's national and international experience in sustainable development, and eco-friendly products, the Environment Possibility Award conferred the "Environmental Heroes of the Year" to Tide in 2020.

In some areas, Tide has become such a hot commodity item, that criminals steal it from stores to resell. Police call the detergent "liquid gold" on the black market and it has been known to be traded or sold for illegal drugs.

== Brand ==
In a 2009 survey, consumers ranked Tide among the three brands they would least likely give up during the Great Recession. The Tide trademark is an easily recognized, distinctive orange-and-yellow bulls-eye. This original logo was designed by Donald Deskey, an architect and famous industrial designer. The logo was slightly modified for the product's fiftieth anniversary in 1996, and remains in use today.

Tide was the first product to be nationally packaged using Day-Glo colors—strikingly eye-catching when first introduced in 1959.

== Product line ==
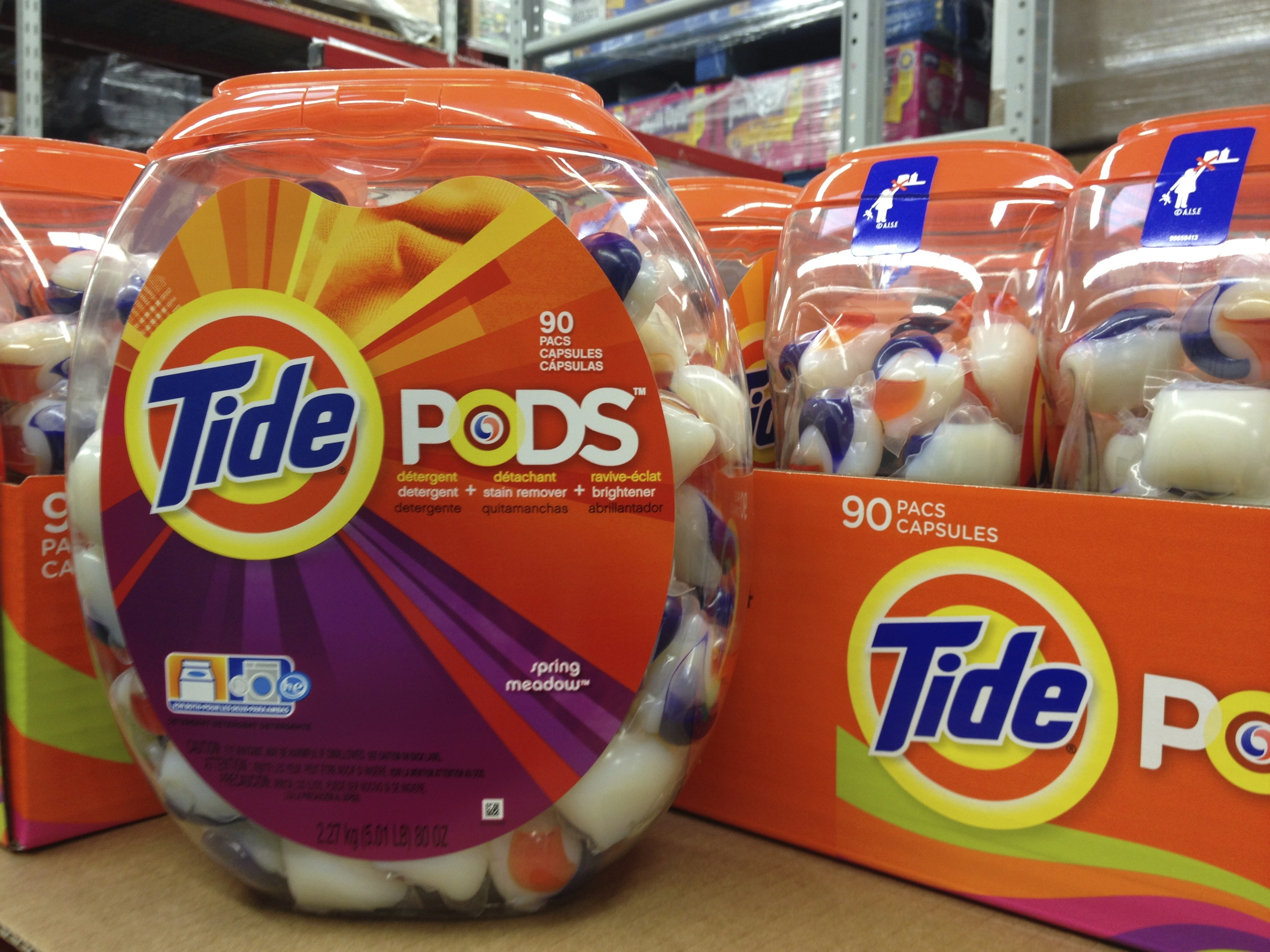
Initial packaging of Tide Pods. The plastic container was later made opaque to reduce the chance of the product being mistaken for candy.

Tide is marketed under various sub-brands, such as 2× Ultra Tide.

In 1968, the Tide brand expanded with Tide XK, the first detergent formula in the US that incorporated cleaning enzymes and was marketed for its "Xtra Kleaning" properties. The brand introduced its first liquid detergent, Tide Liquid, in 1984, which was a clear, orange-tinted formula. In 2005, the brand launched both Tide to Go, a portable pen for on-the-spot stain removal, and Tide Coldwater, a formula specifically designed to clean in cold water to save energy.

Tide Free is marketed as being free from dyes or perfumes. Tide-To-Go is a product packaged in a pen-like format and intended to remove small stains on the spot, without further laundering.

In Puerto Rico, the Tide formula is marketed under the name Ace.

Following the 2000 launch and 2002 withdrawal of Tide's first attempt at a laundry tablet (Tide Rapid Action Tablets), Proctor & Gamble spent eight years developing a successor that contained both a liquid and a powder, finally introducing Tide Pods in early 2012. As of 2016, the pods have grown to account for an estimated 15% of the brand's total sales. In late 2017, an Internet meme was popularized around the concept of eating Tide Pods and, as a result, people attempted the extremely dangerous "Tide Pods Challenge".

After a debut at SXSW in 2024 and regional testing in 2025, Procter & Gamble began the national rollout of Tide evo in 2026. The detergent format consists of dry, fiber-based 3.5 inch-square tiles that utilize layered cleaning ingredients designed to dissolve in cold water and are sold in recyclable paperboard packaging.

Tide Cleaners is the name of a dry cleaning and laundry service with hundreds of locations across Chicago, Philadelphia, Denver, Washington D.C., Boston, Cincinnati, Houston, Dallas, Nashville and Charlotte.

== Sponsorships ==
=== Super Bowl ===
Procter & Gamble has run Super Bowl commercials to promote Tide. The first ad which was run in 2008 was the "Talking Stain", a campaign promoting Tide To Go.

Tide aired an episodic three-part ad during Super Bowl LI that starred Fox NFL Sunday co-host Terry Bradshaw, where he discovers a stain on his shirt right before going on air from Fox's set at NRG Stadium, prompting him to—as seen in a second commercial later in the game—quickly travel to Jeffrey Tambor's house so he could clean it with Tide. Rob Gronkowski is also featured in the campaign, including the pre-Super Bowl teasers where Gronkowski runs a laundromat with Tambor as an unhappy client. In the conclusion (aired near the end of the game), Bradshaw makes it back to the game, only for his colleague Curt Menefee to spill coffee on his shirt, with Tambor (who is watching from home) refusing to help again. To make the sequence plausibly live, the ad was filmed over the weeks immediately after the Conference Championship Games, and required P&G's agency to construct a replica of Fox's actual on-field set for the game as well as for Bradshaw and Menefee to don the same attire from the ad for the actual broadcast. Visual effects were used to correctly reflect the look of the stadium and the teams participating in the game.

During Super Bowl LII, Tide aired a series of commercials starring David Harbour, which presented several types of commercials that viewers often see during the Super Bowl, only to reveal that they are all actually commercials for Tide because all of their clothes are perfectly clean. Some of the commercials included crossovers with ads for other Procter & Gamble products, including a Mr. Clean ad aired during Super Bowl LI, and Old Spice's "The Man Your Man Could Smell Like" ad.

=== NASCAR ===
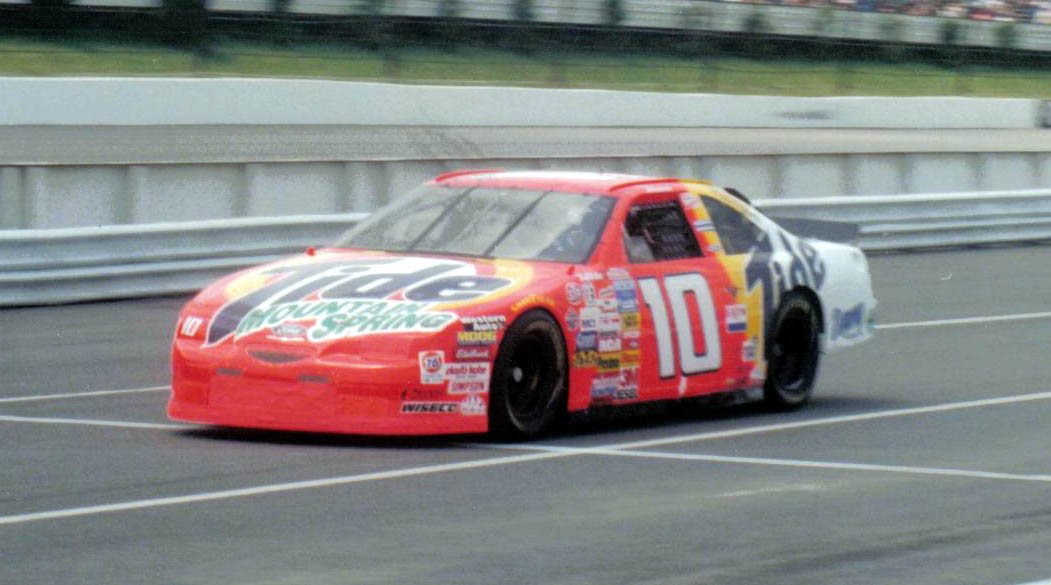
The "Tide Ride", driven by Ricky Rudd at Pocono Raceway in 1997

Tide has sponsored several NASCAR stock cars, notably the Chevrolet "Tide Ride" driven by Darrell Waltrip as #17 for Hendrick Motorsports. The relationship lasted from 1987 to 1990 and won the 1989 Daytona 500. Waltrip left the team to form his own team.

Tide then sponsored Ricky Rudd in the #5 car after Levi Garrett left Hendrick. Rudd drove for Hendrick until 1993, when he left the racing team, also to form his own team and taking the Tide sponsorship. Rudd Performance Motorsports ran from 1994 to 1999 and won the 4th Brickyard 400 in 1997. After Rudd became winless in his first time in 17 seasons, Tide left Rudd after being lured by Calvin Well's new team PPI Motorsports. The new team's number was 32, which the sum of 17, 5, and 10. Scott Pruett was the first driver but after DNQing 6 times and no Top 10s, Ricky Craven took over in 2001 and responded with a win at Martinsville Speedway. He went winless in 2002, but one year later, he won the closest race in NASCAR history at Darlington in the Carolina Dodge Dealers 400, rubbing with Kurt Busch for laps and with a margin-of-victory of 0.002 seconds. After no Top 10s halfway through the 2004 season, Craven left PPI and was replaced by Bobby Hamilton Jr. for 2004 and 2005. Travis Kvapil ran for PPI in 2006 but with four DNQs.

Tide left the sport before it was going to sponsor one of Well's proposed Toyota teams in 2007. Tide was on Kevin Harvick's truck a few times, but Kroger was also promoting the car. Tide made its Cup series return in September 2016, when it sponsored Matt Kenseth's No. 20 car for a Darlington tribute scheme. Tide extended their sponsorship to Joe Gibbs Racing to three races in 2017.

Year	Driver	Team	No.	Make	1	2	3	4	5	6	7	8	9	10	11	12	13	14	15	16	17	18	19	20	21	22	23	24	25	26	27	28	29	30	31	32	33	34	35	36	Owners	Pts
1987	Darrell Waltrip	Hendrick Motorsports	17	Chevy	DAY 8	CAR 7	RCH 20	ATL 6	DAR 10	NWS 21	BRI 12	MAR 21	TAL 11	CLT 5	DOV 7	POC 13	RSD 30	MCH 7	DAY 4	POC 19	TAL 4	GLN 11	MCH 17	BRI 21	DAR 10	RCH 2	DOV 10	MAR 1	NWS 12	CLT 9	CAR 3	RSD 6	ATL 18								4th	3911
1988	Darrell Waltrip	Hendrick Motorsports	17	Chevy	DAY 11	RCH 4	CAR 24	ATL 3	DAR 24	BRI 23	NWS 14	MAR 5	TAL 37	CLT 1	DOV 23	RSD 28	POC 6	MCH 8	DAY 5	POC 5	TAL 33*	GLN 20	MCH 17	BRI 7	DAR 4	RCH 8	DOV 17	MAR 1	CLT 2	NWS 12	CAR 31	PHO 13	ATL 5								6th	3764
1989	Darrell Waltrip	Hendrick Motorsports	17	Chevy	DAY 1	CAR 29	ATL 1	RCH 7	DAR 36	BRI 2	NWS 8	MAR 1*	TAL 5	CLT 1	DOV 9	SON 38	POC 32	MCH 3	DAY 19	POC 4	TAL 2	GLN 16	MCH 37	BRI 1*	DAR 22	RCH 6	DOV 18	MAR 1	CLT 14	NWS 20	CAR 3	PHO 4	ATL 5								4th	3971
1990	Darrell Waltrip	Hendrick Motorsports	17	Chevy	DAY 14	RCH 12	CAR 6	ATL 26	DAR 11	BRI 9*	NWS 2	MAR 4	TAL 10	CLT 22	DOV 19	SON 33	POC 8	MCH 15	DAY INQ^{†}	POC 20						RCH 3	DOV 19	MAR 19	NWS 7	CLT 9	CAR 8	PHO 4	ATL 5								5th	3691
1990	Jimmy Horton	Hendrick Motorsports	17	Chevy															DAY 17		TAL 13																				5th	3691
1990	Sarel van der Merwe	Hendrick Motorsports	17	Chevy																		GLN 24																			5th	3691
1990	Greg Sacks	Hendrick Motorsports	17	Chevy																			MCH 2	BRI 20	DAR 30																5th	3691
1991	Ricky Rudd	Hendrick Motorsports	5	Chevy	DAY; 9	RCH; 2*	CAR; 4	ATL; 6	DAR; 1	BRI; 5*	NWS; 11	MAR; 11	TAL; 13	CLT; 9	DOV; 10	SON; 2	POC; 20	MCH; 8	DAY; 9	POC; 20	TAL; 4	GLN; 2	MCH; 11	BRI; 5	DAR; 15	RCH; 5	DOV; 7	MAR; 8	NWS; 12	CLT; 32	CAR; 12	PHO; 11	ATL; 11								2nd	4092
1992	Ricky Rudd	Hendrick Motorsports	5	Chevy	DAY; 40	CAR; 28	RCH; 6	ATL; 12	DAR; 5	BRI; 6	NWS; 3	MAR; 23	TAL; 26	CLT; 9	DOV; 6	SON; 4	POC; 36	MCH; 5	DAY; 7	POC; 4	TAL; 4*	GLN; 13	MCH; 36	BRI; 8	DAR; 10	RCH; 6	DOV; 1	MAR; 10	NWS; 15	CLT; 5	CAR; 3	PHO; 30	ATL; 25								7th	3735
1993	Ricky Rudd	Hendrick Motorsports	5	Chevy	DAY; 30	CAR; 12	RCH; 15	ATL; 5	DAR; 19	BRI; 26	NWS; 7	MAR; 29	TAL; 41	SON; 3	CLT; 37	DOV; 35	POC; 9	MCH; 1	DAY; 4	NHA; 5	POC; 11	TAL; 24	GLN; 24	MCH; 35*	BRI; 22	DAR; 6	RCH; 4	DOV; 21	MAR; 4	NWS; 5	CLT; 8	CAR; 14	PHO; 6	ATL; 2							10th	3644
1994	Ricky Rudd	Rudd Performance Motorsports	10	Ford	DAY; 8	CAR; 11	RCH; 18	ATL; 9	DAR; 9	BRI; 32	NWS; 6	MAR; 12	TAL; 25	SON; 14	CLT; 6	DOV; 19	POC; 21	MCH; 4	DAY; 17	NHA; 1	POC; 6	TAL; 7	IND; 11	GLN; 5	MCH; 10	BRI; 12	DAR; 4	RCH; 5	DOV; 18	MAR; 25	NWS; 11	CLT; 29	CAR; 4	PHO; 7	ATL; 14						6th	4050
1995	Ricky Rudd	Rudd Performance Motorsports	10	Ford	DAY; 13	CAR; 4	RCH; 21	ATL; 8	DAR; 41	BRI; 5	NWS; 29	MAR; 30	TAL; 22	SON; 4	CLT; 5	DOV; 31	POC; 13	MCH; 38	DAY; 8	NHA; 5	POC; 3	TAL; 41	IND; 20	GLN; 4	MCH; 30	BRI; 36	DAR; 6	RCH; 8	DOV; 10	MAR; 27	NWS; 5	CLT; 4*	CAR; 13	PHO; 1	ATL; 10						9th	3734
1996	Ricky Rudd	Rudd Performance Motorsports	10	Ford	DAY; 9	CAR; 4	RCH; 9	ATL; 8	DAR; 9	BRI; 14	NWS; 15	MAR; 23	TAL; 28	SON; 7	CLT; 15	DOV; 8	POC; 2	MCH; 31	DAY; 33	NHA; 3	POC; 2	TAL; 37	IND; 6	GLN; 34	MCH; 8	BRI; 9	DAR; 16	RCH; 12	DOV; 34	MAR; 35	NWS; 7	CLT; 13	CAR; 1	PHO; 14	ATL; 8						6th	3845
1997	Ricky Rudd	Rudd Performance Motorsports	10	Ford	DAY; 9	CAR; 4	RCH; 6	ATL; 30	DAR; 23	TEX; 5	BRI; 27	MAR; 13	SON; 34	TAL; 11	CLT; 10	DOV; 1	POC; 21	MCH; 13	CAL; 3	DAY; 34	NHA; 9	POC; 36	IND; 1	GLN; 40	MCH; 29	BRI; 19	DAR; 5	RCH; 28	NHA; 42	DOV; 6	MAR; 13	CLT; 41	TAL; 34	CAR; 40	PHO; 36	ATL; 37					17th	3330
1998	Ricky Rudd	Rudd Performance Motorsports	10	Ford	DAY; 42	CAR; 43	LVS; 12	ATL; 23	DAR; 33	BRI; 30	TEX; 27	MAR; 14	TAL; 24	CAL; 11	CLT; 31	DOV; 6	RCH; 11	MCH; 37	POC; 41	SON; 28	NHA; 19	POC; 42	IND; 31	GLN; 14	MCH; 13	BRI; 9	NHA; 10	DAR; 22	RCH; 34	DOV; 13	MAR; 1	CLT; 37	TAL; 18	DAY; 27	PHO; 27	CAR; 10	ATL; 24				23rd	3131
1999	Ricky Rudd	Rudd Performance Motorsports	10	Ford	DAY; 30	CAR; 30	LVS; 43	ATL; 25	DAR; 27	TEX; 19	BRI; 38	MAR; 29	TAL; 19	CAL; 41	RCH; 36	CLT; 28	DOV; 14	MCH; 38	POC; 15	SON; 38	DAY; 13	NHA; 27	POC; 27	IND; 9	GLN; 32	MCH; 38	BRI; 3	DAR; 34	RCH; 27	NHA; 42	DOV; 37	MAR; 18	CLT; 38	TAL; 3	CAR; 19	PHO; 5	HOM; 41	ATL; 7			31st	2922
2000	Scott Pruett	PPI Motorsports	32	Ford	DAY; 19	CAR; DNQ	LVS; 42	ATL; 41	DAR; DNQ	BRI; DNQ	TEX; 27	MAR; 32	TAL; 20	CAL; 34	RCH; 27	CLT; 41	DOV; 38	MCH; 19	POC; 31	SON; 39	DAY; 40	NHA; 30	POC; 36	IND; 10	GLN; DNQ	MCH; 17	BRI; 38	DAR; 24	RCH; 16	NHA; 41	DOV; 42	MAR; DNQ	CLT; DNQ	TAL; 39	CAR; 30	PHO; 34	HOM; 43	ATL; 32			37th	1929
2001	Ricky Craven	PPI Motorsports	32	Ford	DAY; 23	CAR; 5	LVS; 41	ATL; 13	DAR; 27	BRI; 23	TEX; 27	MAR; 28	TAL; 15	CAL; 41	RCH; 43	CLT; 31	DOV; 4	MCH; 35	POC; 43	SON; 16	DAY; 33	CHI; 21	NHA; 38	POC; 10	IND; 9	GLN; 35	MCH; 2	BRI; 38	DAR; 18	RCH; 11	DOV; 26	KAN; 21	CLT; 35	MAR; 1*	TAL; 24	PHO; 8	CAR; 12	HOM; 30	ATL; 38	NHA; 38	21st	3379
2002	Ricky Craven	PPI Motorsports	32	Ford	DAY; 17	CAR; 5	LVS; 31	ATL; 5	DAR; 41	BRI; 13	TEX; 14	MAR; 30	TAL; 18	CAL; 37	RCH; 9	CLT; 3	DOV; 7	POC; 14	MCH; 15	SON; 19	DAY; 23	CHI; 20	NHA; 21	POC; 17	IND; 33	GLN; 34	MCH; 17	BRI; 16	DAR; 14	RCH; 21	NHA; 6	DOV; 9	KAN; 38	TAL; 15	CLT; 36	MAR; 7	ATL; 21	CAR; 9	PHO; 34	HOM; 24	15th	3888
2003	Ricky Craven	PPI Motorsports	32	Pontiac	DAY; 26	CAR; 4	LVS; 36	ATL; 12	DAR; 1	BRI; 15	TEX; 21	TAL; 4	MAR; 27	CAL; 15	RCH; 38	CLT; 38	DOV; 8	POC; 10	MCH; 15	SON; 21	DAY; 43	CHI; 25	NHA; 21	POC; 40	IND; 17	GLN; 28	MCH; 40	BRI; 8	DAR; 8	RCH; 30	NHA; 38	DOV; 40	TAL; 8	KAN; 41	CLT; 19	MAR; 32	ATL; 35	PHO; 38	CAR; 39	HOM; 29	27th	3334
2004	Ricky Craven	PPI Motorsports	32	Chevy	DAY; 23	CAR; 35	LVS; 25	ATL; 22	DAR; 36	BRI; 22	TEX; 28	MAR; 16	TAL; 43	CAL; 18	RCH; 26	CLT; 24	DOV; 16	POC; 34	MCH; 29	SON; 16	DAY; 38	CHI; 38	NHA; 38	POC; 20	IND; 24	GLN; 32	MCH; 35	BRI; 34			NHA; 17										34th	2309
2004	Bobby Hamilton Jr.	PPI Motorsports	32	Chevy																									CAL; 38	RCH; 11		DOV; 29	TAL; 43	KAN; 23	CLT; 15	MAR; 36	ATL; 38	PHO; 16	DAR; 31	HOM; 21	34th	2309
2005	Bobby Hamilton Jr.	PPI Motorsports	32	Chevy	DAY; 35	CAL; 20	LVS; 11	ATL; 38	BRI; 39	MAR; 40	TEX; 39	PHO; 35	TAL; 40	DAR; 30	RCH; 36	CLT; DNQ	DOV; 21	POC; 23	MCH; 31		DAY; 38	CHI; 21	NHA; 28	POC; 23	IND; 39		MCH; 35	BRI; 35	CAL; 23	RCH; 43	NHA; 29	DOV; 33	TAL; DNQ	KAN; 43	CLT; 41	MAR; 30	ATL; DNQ	TEX; 38	PHO; 35	HOM; 36	37th	2348
2005	Ron Fellows	PPI Motorsports	32	Chevy																SON; 8						GLN; 25															37th	2348
2006	Travis Kvapil	PPI Motorsports	32	Chevy	DAY; 27	CAL; DNQ	LVS; 39	ATL; DNQ	BRI; 40	MAR; 34	TEX; 27	PHO; 21	TAL; 19	RCH; 27	DAR; 30	CLT; 22	DOV; 29	POC; 19	MCH; 21		DAY; 30	CHI; 37	NHA; 35	POC; 27	IND; 25		MCH; 21	BRI; 20	CAL; 34	RCH; 28	NHA; 27	DOV; 39	KAN; 19	TAL; DNQ	CLT; 20	MAR; 40	ATL; 32	TEX; 28	PHO; 30	HOM; 27	37th	2648
2006	Ron Fellows	PPI Motorsports	32	Chevy																SON; 37						GLN; 32															37th	2648
