= Dishwashing liquid =

Detergent used for cleaning dishes

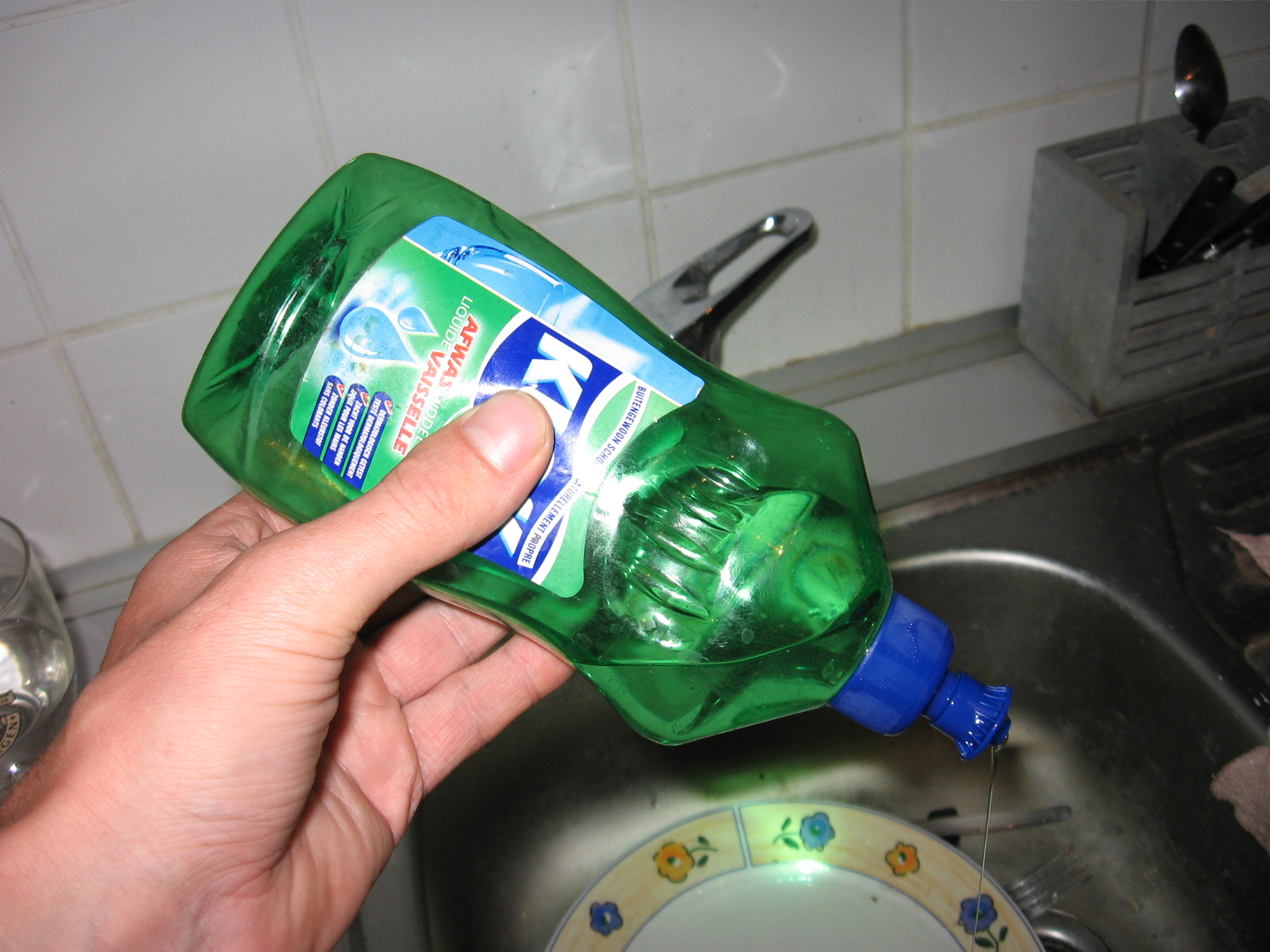
Dishwashing liquid in use

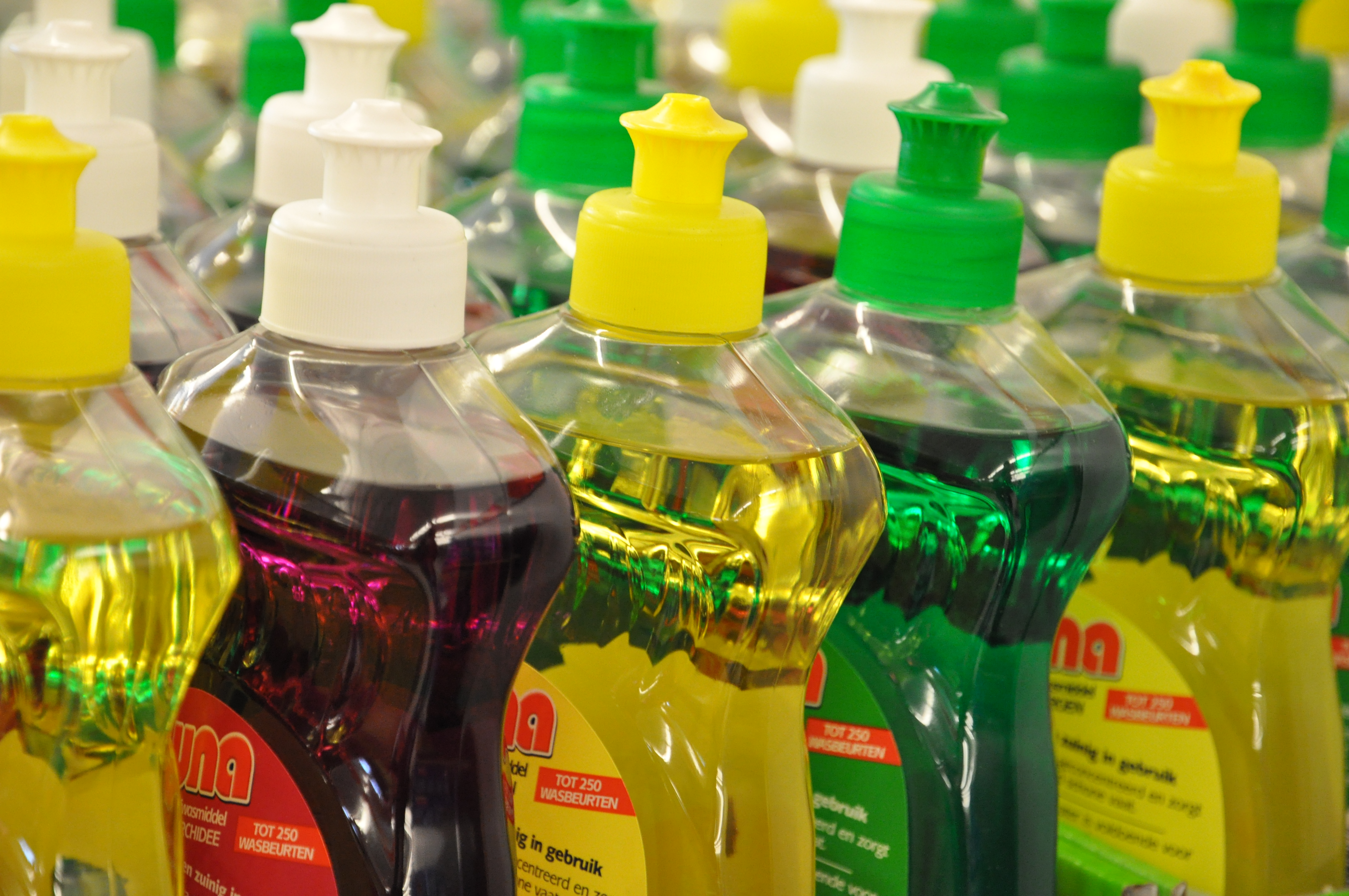
Dishwashing liquid with different dyes/scents

Dishwashing liquid (washing-up liquid in British English), also known as dishwashing soap, dish detergent, or dish soap, is a type of detergent used in dishwashing. It is usually a foamy mixture of surfactants with low skin irritation that consumers use primarily for washing glasses, plates, cutlery, and cooking utensils. Dishwashing liquid can be used for other purposes, like creating bubbles, washing clothes, and cleaning wildlife affected by oil spills. Detergent for dishwashers is also available in non-liquid forms, such as cartridges, gels, packs, powder, and tablets.

Dishwashing liquid has been in use for a long time in various compositions and under different conditions. Most modern dishwashing liquids function best with hot water. However, there are dishwashing products designed to work well with cold water or seawater.

== History ==
Household dishwashing predates modern detergents by many centuries. Before the development of synthetic detergents and liquid dish soaps, crockery and utensils were usually scrubbed with hot water and abrasives such as sand, ashes or washing soda (sodium carbonate), or with the same bar soaps and soap flakes used for laundry and personal washing.

In the early 20th century, chemists developed the first synthetic detergents, initially in Germany, as substitutes for soap in situations where shortages of natural fats and the tendency of soap to form insoluble “soap scum” in hard water limited its usefulness. During the 1930s and 1940s, companies such as Procter & Gamble commercialised household synthetic detergents for laundry, including Dreft (1933) and the heavy-duty powdered detergent Tide (1946). These low-suds synthetic surfactants could be formulated as liquids and performed better than traditional soaps in hard water, paving the way for specialised dishwashing detergents.

Dedicated dishwashing detergents emerged alongside these developments. Industry accounts describe liquid dishwashing detergents being manufactured in the United States from the 1930s and 1940s, while in Europe the synthetic detergent Teepol, introduced in the United Kingdom in 1942, was promoted for washing dishes as well as industrial cleaning. Liquid formulations for hand dishwashing gradually replaced traditional bar soaps in many markets.

Commercially packaged liquid dishwashing detergents became widely available in the post Second World War period. In the United States, Procter & Gamble introduced Joy in 1949 as one of the first nationally marketed liquid dish soaps, promoted for fast foaming and grease cutting in household sinks rather than in mechanical dishwashers. Company and brand histories describe Joy as the first widely distributed liquid dish soap in the U.S. market and note that it remained an important brand for several decades.

In the 1950s and early 1960s, liquid dishwashing detergents spread to other markets. Unilever’s Sunlight brand launched a dishwashing liquid in 1957, reflecting a wider shift from general purpose soap bars toward purpose made household cleaners. In Europe, Procter & Gamble developed Fairy Liquid, sold from 1950 in the United Kingdom and later in other European countries, advertising both its grease removal performance and its relative mildness on users’ hands.

By the 1950s and 1960s, dishwashing liquids had become standard household products in many industrialised countries, competing on lather, fragrance and convenience as part of a broader post-war boom in branded cleaning products. Colgate-Palmolive introduced Palmolive dishwashing liquid in 1966; company histories describe it as a liquid dish soap that was “tough on grease, soft on hands”, a positioning reinforced by long-running television commercials featuring the fictional manicurist “Madge”.

In 1973, Procter & Gamble launched Dawn in the United States as a high foaming liquid detergent for hand dishwashing. Trade and popular accounts describe Dawn as becoming the leading dishwashing liquid in the U.S. market over the following decades and note the later introduction of “ultra” concentrated formulations in the 1990s. Other manufacturers likewise introduced concentrated liquids, color and fragrance-varied products and private-label alternatives, while continuing to market legacy brands such as Joy, Fairy and Palmolive.

From the 1960s onward, environmental concerns increasingly influenced detergent and dishwashing liquid formulation. Synthetic detergents, including dishwashing products, frequently contained phosphate “builders” to improve cleaning in hard water, but phosphates were later linked to nutrient pollution and algal blooms in lakes and rivers. As regulators restricted phosphates in household detergents in the 1970s, manufacturers reformulated products with alternative builders and enzymes and began to promote “phosphate-free” or “low-phosphate” detergents.

Since the late 20th century, dishwashing liquids have also been affected by broader trends toward milder and more environmentally benign household cleaners. Manufacturers introduced products advertised as gentle on skin, “biodegradable” or based partly on plant derived surfactants, alongside conventional petroleum based formulations. Some dishwashing liquids incorporated antibacterial agents such as triclosan, but regulatory reviews in the United States and elsewhere concluded in the 2010s that such ingredients offered little benefit in consumer wash products and raised health and environmental concerns, leading to bans or restrictions and further reformulation of liquid soaps and detergents.

Dishwashing liquids have also found uses beyond domestic sinks. Wildlife rescue organizations and U.S. agencies report using diluted Dawn dish detergent to remove petroleum residues from birds and marine mammals contaminated in oil spills, a practice that has been widely publicised since the late 20th century and incorporated into cause-related marketing by the brand’s owner.

== Composition ==
Dishwashing liquid may contain bleach, enzymes, and rinsing aids. The main ingredient is water and the main active ingredients are detergents. Dishwashing liquid uses detergent instead of soap because soaps are likely to react with minerals in the water to form soap scum. Dishwashing liquids also use thickening and stabilizing agents. Other ingredients may include hydrotropes, salts, preservatives, fragrances, antibacterial ingredients, and dyes. Preservatives prevent the proliferation of microorganisms within the liquid. Antibacterial ingredients make it difficult for bacteria to survive on surfaces.

Alternatives to dishwashing detergents may be homemade, using ingredients such as borax, essential oil, eucalyptus oil, leftover cooking oil, and bar soap.

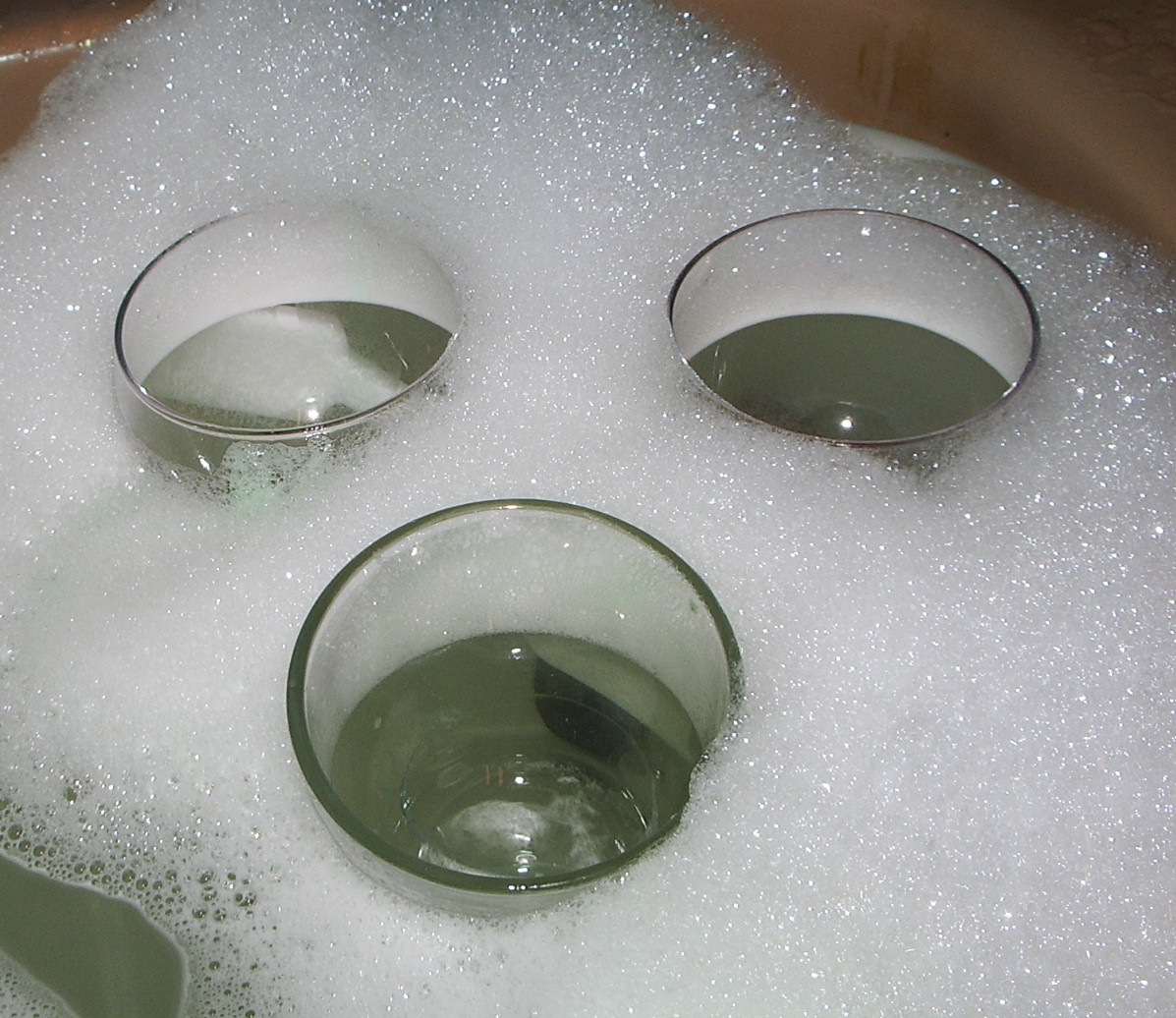
Water and dishwashing liquid mixing to form foam

Items that may be damaged by some dishwashing liquids (especially with used with hot water or put into a dishwasher) include household silver, fine glassware, gold-leafed objects, disposable plastics, and objects made of brass, bronze, cast iron, pewter, tin, or wood. Dishwashing liquid components are harder to rinse off rough surfaces than smooth surfaces, which increases the risk of accidental ingestion.

In hand dishwashing detergents surfactants play the primary role in cleaning. The reduced surface tension of water and the increased solubility of modern surfactant mixtures allow water to run off dishes very quickly. Additionally, surfactants remove grease and food particles, and may provide foam.

=== Surfactant design ===
Surfactants reduce the surface tension of water: this reduction helps with the cleaning process. Surfactants have been compared to determine which dishwashing liquid is the most efficient. One study showed that a combination of anionic surfactant and non-ionic surfactant worked better than other combinations. Another found that a combination of cationic and anionic surfactants worked better than one of non-ionic and anionic surfactants. Anionic and amphoteric surfactants are a less effective combination.

== Safety concerns ==
In 2010, the United States FDA raised health concerns over triclosan, an antibacterial substance used in some dish liquids. Elsewhere, triclosan has been found to create problems at wastewater treatment plants; it can "sabotage some sludge-processing microbes and promote drug resistance in others." As of 2025, triclosan has been banned in the United States, the European Union, Canada, Australia, and elsewhere.

Some dishwashing products contain phosphates. Phosphates make dishes cleaner but can cause harmful algal bloom as wastewater returns to the natural environment. For this reason, many places have banned this component. Phosphates can also have harmful health effects when they come into contact with skin.

Many dishwashing liquids contain perfume, which can cause irritant or allergic contact dermatitis. It can also cause hand eczema. People with sensitive skin are advised to use hypoallergenic gloves to avoid direct contact with the liquids. Surfactants that are anionic showed promising results in preventing skin irritation.

== Primary uses ==
Dishwashing liquid is primarily used for removing food stains and grease from dirty dishes and tableware. Consumers usually scrape heavy soil (large food particles) from the dishes before applying the dishwashing liquid.

=== Hand dishwashing ===
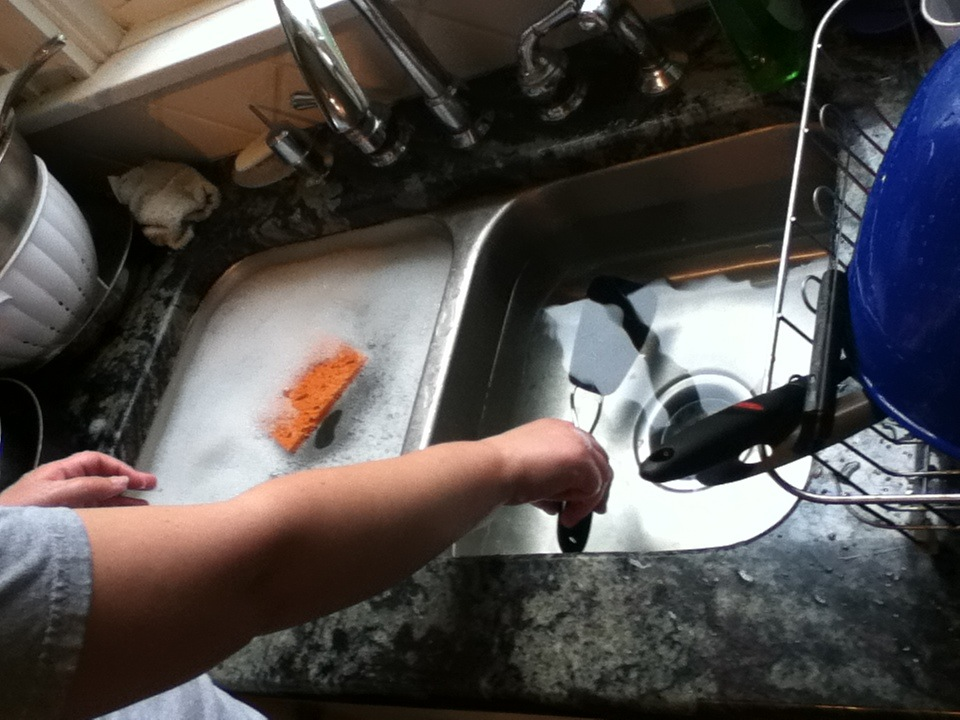
Dishwashing process

Consumers wash by hand if they do not have a dishwashing machine or if they have large "hard-to-clean" items.

=== Automatic dishwashing ===
Automatic dishwashing means the use of a dishwasher or other apparatus. It is generally preferred for convenience or sanitation. The cleaning is less reliant on the detergent's surfactants and more on the machine's hot water as well as on the detergent's builders, bleach, and enzymes. Automatic dishwashing detergents' surfactants generally have less foam, to avoid disrupting the machine.

== Other uses ==
=== Domestic uses ===
Reader's Digest notes that dishwashing liquid may be used to kill ants and weeds, to help spread waterborne fertilizer, and to wash human hair. Good Housekeeping suggests mixing it with vinegar to attract and drown fruit flies. Oregon State University's Cooperative Extension Service notes the use of dishwashing liquid to get rid of spider mites.

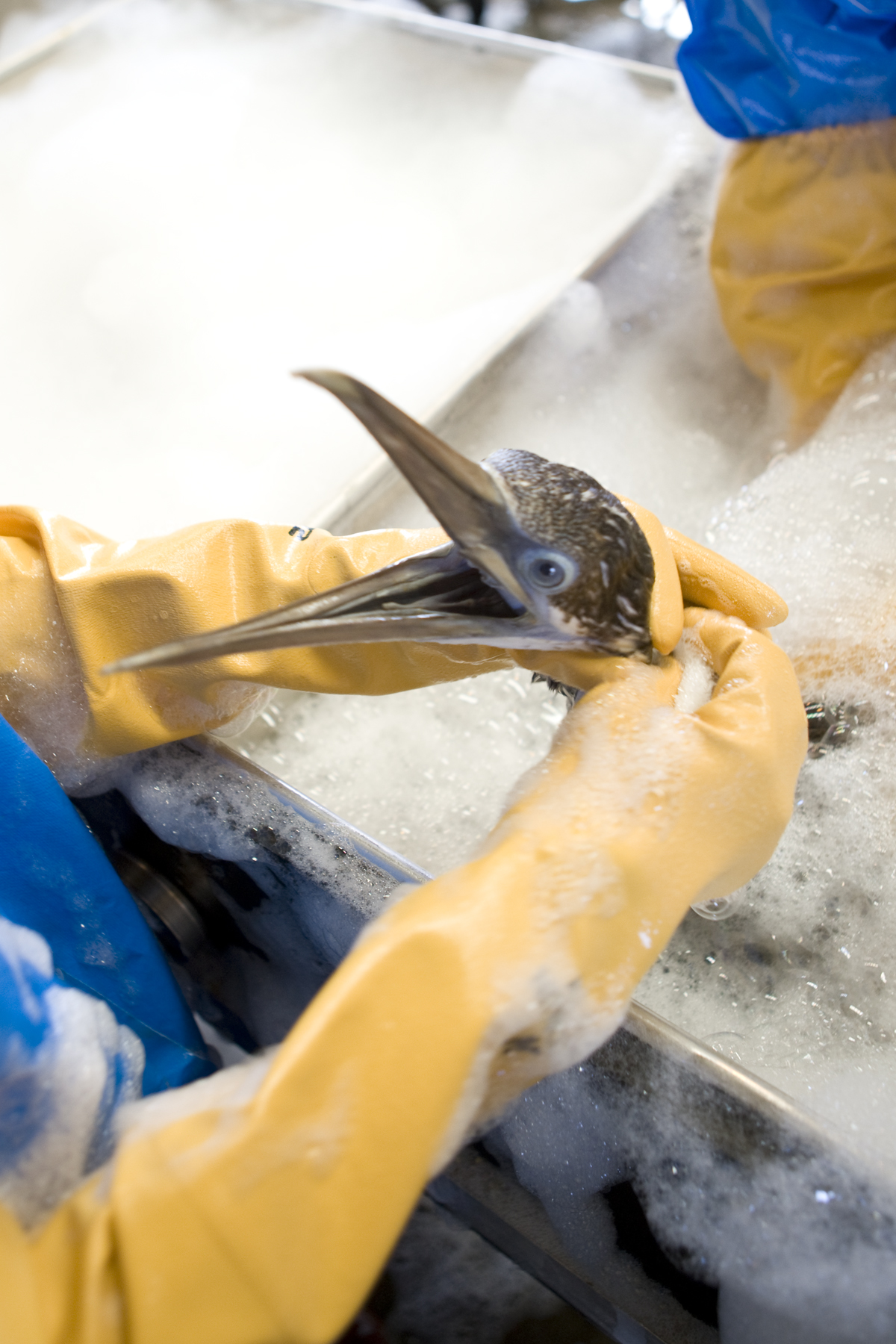
Washing an oiled gannet with dishwashing liquid

Some other uses of dishwashing liquid are:

- Cleaning mirrors and windows.
- Cleaning delicate clothing such as hosiery and lingerie.
- Making decals and vinyl graphics easier to position when applying.
- Making homemade garden pest deterrents.
- Removing coffee, tea, olive oil, soda and fruit juice stains from fabrics.

=== Industrial uses ===
Dishwashing liquid is used for inspecting equipment under pressure for leaks, such as propane fittings. It can also be used for inspecting pneumatic tires for flats, as well as for quality assurance during the installation process, and as a mounting bead lubricant. Dishwashing liquid can also treat birds in oil spills.

== Market share ==
Market research companies like Euromonitor and Grand View Research collect data on different brands' market share.

Euromonitor International collects market trends of many big brands like Procter and Gamble, Colgate-Palmolive, Henkel, Reckitt Benckiser, Unilever, and Ajax.

For example, according to Euromonitor International, in 2013 Reckitt Benckiser held the highest retail value share percentages in nine countries: Italy (31%) and Spain (29%) with the Finish brand; Australia (38%), New Zealand (38%), Austria (32%), Ireland (29%), and Israel (27%), and Denmark (30%) with the Neophos brand; and Portugal (22%) with the Calgonit brand.

As of 2025, the global dishwashing liquids market is valued at approximately US$18 billion.

== See also ==
- Dishwasher detergent
- Cleaning agent
  - List of cleaning agents
  - List of cleaning products
- Soap
- Green cleaning
- Washing
