= Dishwasher detergent =

Type of detergent used in a dishwasher

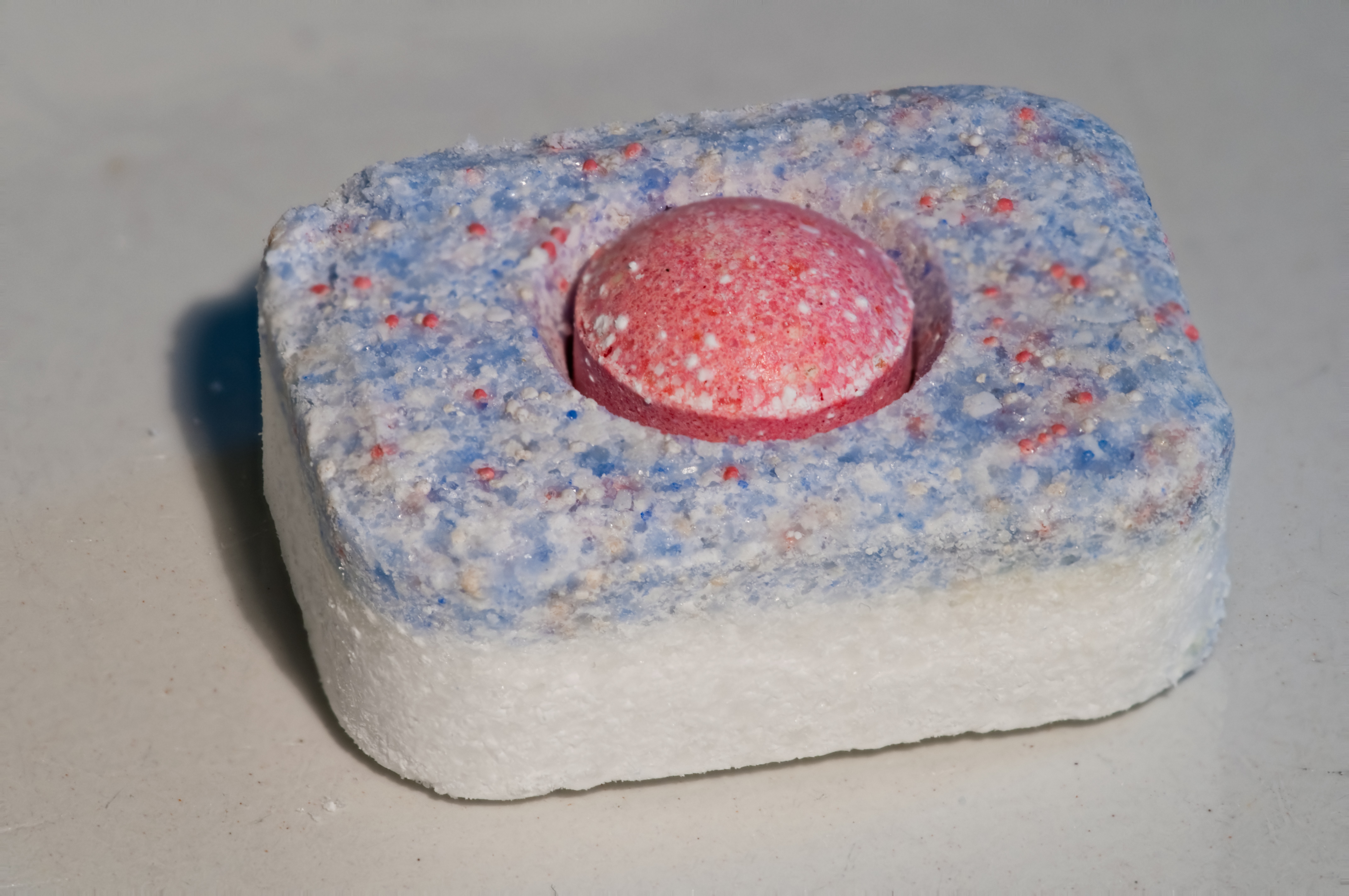
A Finish dishwashing detergent tablet

Dishwasher detergent is a detergent made for washing dishes in a dishwasher. Dishwasher detergent is different from dishwashing liquid made to wash dishes by hand.

== Uses ==
When using a dishwasher, the user must select a special detergent for its use. All detergents are designed for use after the user scrapes leftover food from the dishes before washing. To function, the user places dishes in the dishwasher in such fashion that the surface of all dishes is open to the flow of water.

Most dishwasher detergents are incompatible for use with silver, brass, cast iron, bronze, aluminum, pewter, and goldleaf. They can also harm disposable plastic, anything wood, knives with hollow handles, and fine glassware.They can lead to these materials to be bleached or oxidized.

== Types ==
Dishwasher detergent can be categorised into three main groups:

1. Powder is a typically budget-friendly detergent, containing powders or granules of water softeners and buffers (e.g. sodium tripolyphosphate), anti-caking agents, and surfactants. Unlike other types of detergent, powders have a much higher percentage of alkaline builders (up to 45-70% sodium carbonate and 5-30% silicates by weight).
2. Gel or liquid detergent is mostly water, with less than 10% builder by weight. It also contains a high concentration of sulfates (20-50% w/w) to control density and even pouring, bind ingredients, prevent corrosion in the washing system, and as a water softener.
3. Pods (also called pac(ket)s or tab(let)s) are either small, concentrated bricks of compressed powdered detergent or concentrated liquid detergent encased in a poly(vinyl alcohol) (PVA) packet.

== Composition ==
Different kinds of dishwashing detergent contain different combinations of ingredients. Common ingredients include:

- Phosphates: Bind calcium and magnesium ions to prevent 'hard-water' type limescale deposits. They can cause ecological damage via eutrophication, and have been partially banned or phased out.
- Oxygen-based bleaching agents (older-style powders and liquids contain chlorine-based bleaching agents): Break up and bleach organic deposits.
- Non-ionic surfactants: Lower the surface tension of the water, emulsifies oil, lipid and fat food deposits, prevents droplet spotting on drying.
- Alkaline salts: These are a primary component in older and original-style dishwasher detergent powders. Highly alkaline salts attack and dissolve grease, but are extremely corrosive (fatal) if swallowed. Salts used may include metasilicates, alkali metal hydroxides, sodium carbonate etc.
- Enzymes: Break up protein-based food deposits, and possibly oil, lipid and fat deposits. The enzymes used are similar to the ones used in laundry.
- Anti-corrosion agent(s): Often sodium silicate, this prevents corrosion of dishwasher components.

Dishwashing detergent may also contain:

- Anti-foaming agents: Foam interferes with the washing action. Foam may affect operation of the machine's water-level sensors and will leak past the door seals.
- Additives to slow down the removal of glaze & patterns from glazed ceramics
- Perfumes
- Dyes
- Anti-caking agents (in granular detergent)
- Starches (in tablet based detergents)
- Gelling agents (in liquid/gel based detergents)

Dishwasher detergents are generally strongly alkaline (basic).

Inexpensive powders may contain sand. Such detergents may harm the dishes and the dishwasher. Powdered detergents are more likely to cause fading on china patterns.

Besides older style detergents for dishwashers, biodegradable detergents also exist for dishwashers. These detergents may be more environmentally friendly than conventional detergents.

Hand-washing dish detergent (washing up liquid) creates a large foam of bubbles which will leak from the dishwasher.

=== Rinse aid ===
Rinse aid (sometimes called rinse agent) contains surfactants (such as alcohol ethoxylates) and uses Marangoni stress to prevent droplet formation, so that water drains from the surfaces in thin sheets, rather than forming droplets.

Rinse aid prevents "spotting" on glassware (caused by droplets of water drying and leaving behind dissolved limescale minerals), and improves drying performance as there is less water remaining to be dried, and a thinner sheet of water has a much larger surface area than a droplet of the same volume.

== See also ==
- Dishwashing liquid
- Cleaning agent
  - List of cleaning agents
  - List of cleaning products
- Soap
- Green cleaning
- Washing
