= Snuggle =

Brand of fabric softener

- Product type: Fabric softener
- Current owner: Henkel North American Consumer Goods
- Country: United States
- Introduced: 1983; 43 years ago
- Markets: United States, Canada, South Korea
- Previous owners: Unilever (1983–2008)
- Website: http://www.snuggle.com

Snuggle is a brand of fabric softener sold by Henkel North American Consumer Goods in the United States and Canada. The brand was introduced in 1983 by Unilever. The product is available in sheets or liquid (in concentrate and ready-to-use forms).

In September 2008, Vestar Capital Partners acquired the North American (United States, Canada, and Puerto Rico) laundry business of Unilever, which included the Snuggle, Wisk, All, Surf, and Sunlight brands. The former Unilever businesses were combined with Huish Detergents, Inc. to form the Sun Products Corporation.

On June 24, 2016, Henkel Consumer Goods Inc., a subsidiary of Henkel AG & Co. KGaA signed a definitive agreement to acquire the Sun Products Corporation. The transaction was valued at $3.5 billion.

== Mascot ==
The brand was launched in 1983. The Snuggle Bear is a teddy bear that was introduced in 1986 and has been the mascot for the Snuggle line of fabric softener since then. The puppet was created by Kermit Love. The voice was originally provided by Corinne Orr. In a 2006 radio interview, Micky Dolenz stated that he was the voice of Snuggle at that time. As of late 2009, the bear was voiced by Elena M. Schloss, a New York animation and commercial voice-over actress.

== Recalls ==
In 2001, 150,000 Snuggle "Teeny Bean Bears" included with the sales of the product were recalled because the pom-pom of their nightcaps could detach and pose a choking hazard to babies.

In 2002, 4 million stuffed bears distributed with Snuggle fabric softener were recalled when they were determined to create a choking hazard to babies, because the eyes and nose could come off easily.

== See also ==
- Comfort (fabric softener)
