= Dry Idea =

1978 American brand of antiperspirant

- Product type: Antiperspirant/Deodorant
- Current owner: Thriving Brands LLC
- Country: United States
- Introduced: 1978; 48 years ago
- Markets: United States, Canada
- Previous owners: Gillette; Henkel
- Website: http://www.dryidea.com

Dry Idea is an American brand of antiperspirant manufactured and sold by Thriving Brands LLC.

== History ==
Introduced in 1978 by Gillette Company, Dry Idea was acquired by The Dial Corporation along with the Soft & Dri and Right Guard brands in 2006 for $420 million as a condition set forth by antitrust authorities for Procter & Gamble's $57 billion acquisition of Gillette. The Dial Corporation was acquired by Henkel in 2003.

The brand was acquired by Thriving Brands LLC in June 2021.

== Products ==
Dry Idea antiperspirant deodorants, traditionally unisex, have been around for over three decades.

- Roll-ons (the first product introduced) – 1978
- Aerosols and solids – 1985
- Dry Idea for Men – 1988 (discontinued by the early 1990s)

In the 1980s, Dry Idea was known for its famous commercials starring various celebrities giving advice including the tag line "Never let them see you sweat". Some of these celebrities included NFL Coach Dan Reeves, fashion designer Donna Karan, Comedian Elayne Boosler and Miss America 1987 Kellye Cash. An additional commercial included non-celebrity, Miami resident Bob Ozer, who spoke of Dry Idea helping him avoid being "sopping wet" despite his car being recently stolen and work being tough.

Product Type	Description	Available Scents
Roll-on	This formulation puts the “Dry” in Dry Idea antiperspirants. It contains no water – for a drier application. It’s also time-released for longer-lasting odor protection and fragrance.	Unscented (Hypo-Allergenic), Powder Fresh, Regular
Clear Gel	This extra effective no residue formula goes on clear leaving you with the confidence you want to get through your day.	Powder Fresh, Unscented (Hypo-Allergenic), Fresh Clean
Clinical Invisible Solid / Roll-on	Dry Idea Clinical Complete gives you maximum wetness protection and over 24-Hour Odor Protection without a prescription. Add in skin-conditioning Vitamin E to create a non-irritating, hypoallergenic product that’s kind to skin.	Unscented (Hypo-Allergenic)
