= Hans Van Bylen =

Belgian businessman (born 1961)

- Born: 26 April 1961 (age 65); Berchem, Belgium
- Education: University of Antwerp
- Occupation: Manager
- Title: Former CEO of Henkel
- Term: 2016 – 2019

Hans Van Bylen (born 26 April 1961 in Berchem, Belgium) is a Belgian manager who was the CEO of Henkel from May 2016 to December 2019. He is married with three children.

== About ==
=== Education ===
Hans Van Bylen studied business economics at the University of Antwerp and graduated with both a degree in business management and a Master of Business Administration. He also completed numerous executive development courses, e.g. at Harvard Business School and INSEAD. He is fluent in Dutch, English, German and French.

=== Career ===
Van Bylen joined Henkel in 1984 as Product Manager for detergents in Belgium. After several positions in marketing for detergents and cosmetics, he took over management responsibilities for various countries and regions. In 2005, he became member of Henkel's management board and was Executive Vice President for the Beauty Care business.

In May 2016 Van Bylen was appointed chief executive officer of Henkel, succeeding Kasper Rørsted who joined adidas. Under his leadership, Henkel acquired the US based The Sun Products Corporation for 3.2 billion euros in June 2016. In November 2016, he presented the company's new strategy (Henkel 2020+) During his period as CEO, the company realised 25 acquisitions worth 7 billion euros. Henkel saw its turnover grow up to 20.1 billion euros in 2019. In 2019 it was announced that Van Bylen would step down as CEO of Henkel for personal reasons. He was succeeded in 2020 by his right-hand and former Henkel CFO, Carsten Knobel.

Van Bylen was on several boards in the US and in Germany, such as Ecolab and GfK. Moreover, he was active as an independent board member in non-profit organizations like the Federation of German Industries (BDI) and the prestigious European Round Table for Industry (ERT). He was also President of the German Chemical Industry Association (VCI) until March 2020.

Given his many years of business experience at the top of German industry and extensive network in the German business world, Van Bylen is still considered a very influential voice in Belgium today. Since leaving Henkel, Van Bylen has held board positions at Ontex, Etex, LANXESS and AkzoNobel. also joined the board of SN Airholding, the holding company of Brussels Airlines, in 2020. He currently is the chairman of the Belgian diaper manufacturer Ontex and was appointed by the Belgian federal government as a board member of Brussels Airlines, a subsidiary of German carrier Lufthansa.

=== Other activities ===
==== Corporate boards ====
Van Bylan is a part of the GfK and is a Member of the Supervisory Board (2013-2017), the Ecolab as a Member of the Board of Directors (2007-2008), Lanxess, as a Member of the Supervisory Board (2020-ongoing), Brussels Airlines as a Member of the Supervisory Board (2020-ongoing), Ontex as the Chairman of the Board of Directors (2020-ongoing), and Etex as a Member of the Board of Directors (2020-ongoing).

==== Non-profit organizations ====
Van Bylan is a part of the German Chemical Industry Association (VCI) and was President (until March 2020), the Federation of German Industries (BDI) as a Member of the Presidium (2018-2019), Baden-Badener Unternehmer-Gespräche (BBUG) as a Member of the Board of Trustees, Consumer Goods Forum as Member of the Board of Directors, European Round Table of Industrialists (ERT) as a Member, Vlerick Business School as a Member of the advisory board, Facio Therapies as a Member of the Board of Directors, and Friends of the Deutsche Oper am Rhein as a Member of the Board.

== Recognitions ==
Van Bylen was awarded "CEO with the best image 2016 " among Germany's DAX CEOs by media analytics institute Unicepta
