= Purex =

Purex may refer to:

- PUREX (plutonium uranium reduction extraction), a reprocessing process for spent nuclear fuel
- Purex (laundry detergent), a brand of detergent
- Purex Crystals, a laundry fragrance booster
- Toilet tissue brand by Kruger Inc.
- Purex (earwig), a genus of earwigs in the subfamily Spongiphorinae
