= White Rain =

American brand of body wash and hair care products

- Product type: Hair care, Hair spray, body wash
- Current owner: International Wholesale
- Country: United States
- Introduced: 1952; 74 years ago
- Markets: United States
- Previous owners: Gillette (1952–2000); Diamond Products (2000–2007); Sun Products (2007–2012); High Ridge Brands (2012–2021)
- Website: www.whiterain.com

White Rain is an American brand of body wash, hair spray, and hair care products owned by International Wholesale. It was introduced as a shampoo in 1952 by Gillette.

== Ownership history ==
The Gillette Company sold the White Rain brand to Florida-based Diamond Products Company in April 2000.

In 2007, Sun Products acquired the brand from Diamond Products Company.

In 2012, the brand was sold to High Ridge Brands, which owns other former brands of Alberto-Culver.

In February 2021, International Wholesale acquired the White Rain brand from High Ridge Brands.
