= Fa (brand) =

Brand of personal care products owned by Henkel

- Product type: Personal care
- Current owner: Henkel
- Introduced: 1954; 72 years ago
- Website: int.fa.com

Fa is an international brand for personal care products. It is a subsidiary of the German company Henkel. Fa products include skin care lotions, creams and gels, as well as shower gels, bubble baths, soaps and deodorants.

== Name origin ==
The name comes from German: fabelhafte "fabulous" and German: Fadenseife "thread soap".

== History ==
The first Fa product, a bar soap, talc powders was launched in 1954 by Henkel-subsidiary Dreiring. In 1975, Henkel's first Fa shower gel was introduced. Fa products now include bar soaps, liquid soaps, shower gels, bubble baths, roll-on deodorants, stick deodorants and deodorant sprays. Fa is marketed in over 120 countries.

In 2008, the Federal Cartel Office imposed a fine totaling EUR 21.6 million on the Henkel group for price fixing, among other things, for Fa brand shower gel.

The product family includes soap, shower gel and deodorant. Fa is one of the European market leaders. Products are also marketed under the Fa brand in the Middle East, Africa and Asia. In total, Fa is sold in 146 countries. Since Fa gets a new appearance every few years, the brand is considered a prime example for a product relaunch.
