= Right Guard =

Deodorant brand

- Product type: Antiperspirant/Deodorant
- Current owner: Thriving Brands LLC
- Country: United States
- Introduced: 1960; 66 years ago
- Markets: United States, Canada
- Previous owners: Gillette; Henkel
- Website: http://www.rightguard.com

Right Guard is an American brand of deodorant and shower gel that is manufactured and sold by Thriving Brands LLC. It is the second largest brand in the male deodorant category in the United States.

Right Guard was introduced in 1960 by The Gillette Company as the first aerosol deodorant. The Procter & Gamble Company acquired Gillette in 2005 and sold the Right Guard brand to The Dial Corporation, a subsidiary of Henkel, in 2006. The brand was acquired by Thriving Brands LLC in June 2021.

== Marketing ==
Right Guard targets sports enthusiasts, as portrayed through its advertising from the late 1980s to the late 1990s.

From 1969 to 1976, commercials featured a man looking into a mirror to see another man looking back. Chuck McCann played the energetic man who says, "Hi, guy!", looking back at the confused man (played by Bill Fiore), who yells, "Mona!" The BBDO campaign began with the need to show two different cans of Right Guard, one the traditional product, and the other with a more advanced formula.

== Awards ==
Gillette's "Cool Spray" form factor (introduced in 2004) sprayed deodorant vertically from the top of a rounded cylinder upon depression of a side-mounted trigger. No protective cap was needed; a twist-motion procedure locked and unlocked the contents. The form, by design firm Herbst Lazar Bell, won the 2005 personal care award at The Institute of Packaging Professionals' AmeriStar packaging awards. The form was discontinued in 2012.

== Products ==
Right Guard comes in the forms of invisible solid, deodorant stick, clear gel, and aerosol. It used to come in a clear stick, but this appears to have been discontinued by the manufacturer without notice.
