= Dial (soap) =

American brand of soap and body wash

- Current owner: Henkel North American Consumer Goods
- Introduced: 1948; 78 years ago
- Markets: Soaps, (Antimicrobial soaps, Antibacterial soaps)
- Previous owners: Armour and Company (1948–1970), The Greyhound Corporation (1970–1996)
- Tagline: Healthier skin. Healthier you.
- Website: www.dialsoap.com

Dial is an American brand of soap, body wash and hand sanitizer manufactured by Henkel North American Consumer Goods, the American subsidiary of Henkel AG & Co. KGaA. It was the world's first antibacterial soap.

== History ==
Dial emerged as a result of a collaborative effort by a team of accomplished chemists that worked at Armour and Company, with Emmett Patrick Glynn as a key contributor.

In 1948, their creation made its debut in the Chicago market as a product of Armour and Company, a well-established meat-packing company. Armour had produced soap since 1888; its laundry soap was made from tallow, a by-product of Armour's meat production processes. Dial was made antibacterial by the addition of hexachlorophene, referred to by the company as AT-7. The product was named Dial and claimed to provide "round-the-clock" protection against the odor caused by perspiration.

Dial was introduced nationally in 1949 and was advertised as "the first active, really effective deodorant soap in all history [because it] removes skin bacteria that cause perspiration odor". Although researchers had never established a link between hexachlorophene and germ protection, Armour's early advertisements graphically depicted germs and microbes before and after use of Dial soap. Hexachlorophene, the active ingredient in Dial, was removed from the consumer market and strictly limited in the hospital setting in the early 1970s amid reports that it caused neurological damage in infants. When the U.S. Food and Drug Administration (FDA) outlawed its use in non-medicinal products, Armour-Dial replaced it with triclocarban, a synthetic antibacterial compound.

Dial became the leading deodorant soap brand in the U.S. From 1953 until the mid-1990s, Dial soap was advertised under the slogan "Aren't you glad you use Dial? (Don't you wish everybody did?)".

In September 2016, the FDA ruled that antibacterial soaps containing triclocarban and triclosan can no longer be marketed. Dial replaced these ingredients with benzalkonium chloride (for bar soaps) and benzethonium chloride (for liquid hand soaps). In its 2016 ruling, the FDA also stated that it is deferring the final rule on benzalkonium chloride, benzethonium chloride and chloroxylenol by a year to allow for the development and submission of new safety and effectiveness data for these ingredients. Consumer antibacterial washes containing these specific ingredients may be marketed during this time while data is being collected.
