= Coast (soap) =

Brand of bar soap and body wash

- Current owner: Sodalis USA (formerly High Ridge Brands Company)
- Introduced: 1976; 50 years ago
- Markets: Soap
- Previous owners: Procter & Gamble (1976-2000); The Dial Corporation (2000-2012)
- Tagline: The Eye Opener!
- Website: http://www.coastsoap.com/

Coast is an American brand of deodorant soap and body wash owned by Soldalis USA (formerly High Ridge Brands Company). It was originally introduced by Procter & Gamble in 1976. Its marketing catchphrase is "The Eye Opener!" Originally a bar soap, the company also began to produce body wash in 2003.

In 1977 Procter & Gamble launched the Coast formula under the Zest brand name in France, followed by Italy and the UK in 1982. Like US Coast, the European version had the same perfume and was marbled, but colored yellow not blue. The brand was eventually withdrawn from Europe.

In 2000, the Coast brand was sold by Procter & Gamble to The Dial Corporation, an Arizona-based company that became a subsidiary of Henkel in 2004.

In 2012, the Coast brand was sold by Henkel to Brynwood Partners VI LP, a Stamford, Connecticut-based firm, through its subsidiary, High Ridge Brands Company (HRB), which owns a variety of personal care products, including Zest, Alberto VO5, and Rave. HRB filed for bankruptcy in 2019 and was later acquired by Italian company Sodalis Group in October 2024.

== Marketing ==
The target market for Coast soap has always been men. In 2006, the company won a "Top 100 Rebrand award" for a packaging redesign that was credited with doubling sales of the body wash product and maintaining a market presence that had been declining for the bar soaps. To recognize the 35th anniversary of Coast soap, it was marketed in limited-edition "throwback" packaging from the late 1970s, and an online gallery featured several decades of advertisements for the product.

The company has sponsored a car in the Indianapolis 500 and the rest of the Indy Racing League schedule.
