= Zest (brand) =

High Ridge Brands trademark

- Product type: Soap, body wash
- Current owner: Sodalis USA (formerly High Ridge Brands Company) (United States, Canada, Puerto Rico); Unilever (except United States, Canada, Puerto Rico)
- Country: U.S.
- Introduced: 1955; 71 years ago
- Markets: U.S.
- Previous owners: Procter & Gamble
- Tagline: "Zestfully clean!"
- Website: www.zest.com

Zest is an American brand of soap and body wash owned by Sodalis USA (formerly High Ridge Brands) for the United States, Canada, and Puerto Rico and by Unilever for the rest of the world. It was initially introduced by Procter & Gamble in 1955 with the slogan "For the first time in your life, feel really clean."

== History ==
Zest was initially introduced by Procter & Gamble in 1955 and nationally launched in 1957. Zest was initially positioned as a deodorant bar that included both standard soap and synthetic detergent ingredients. The synthetic detergent ingredient prevented the deposition of soap scum in the presence of hard water. Marbled in appearance, Zest came in two variants: Aqua and the yellow, lemon-scented Citrus. By the mid-1960s, the bar no longer had a marbled appearance.

In 1977, Procter & Gamble launched Zest in France, followed by Italy and the UK in 1982. The European version of Zest was yellow and marbled, and it used the same formulation as Coast in the U.S. The brand was subsequently withdrawn in Europe.

In 2011, Procter & Gamble sold the North American and Caribbean rights of Zest to Brynwood Partners VI LP, a Stamford, Connecticut-based firm, through its subsidiary, High Ridge Brands Company (HRB). A company representative from P&G answers why the company decided to sell off Zest: "We continually evaluate all the brands in the portfolio against their strategic fit and value in our longer term global goals. In this case, we felt that Zest, with its great equity in 'clean'...and loyal core following in the U.S. and Canada, was a better value fit for a company that would bring greater focus to it." HRB filed for bankruptcy in 2019 and was later acquired by Italian company Sodalis Group in October 2024.

In 2015, Unilever acquired the rights to the Zest brand outside of North America and the Caribbean from Procter & Gamble.

== Marketing ==
Early commercials stated that Zest is not a soap because it does not leave the sticky film that soap does. A 1970-era commercial illustrated this concept with an apparent demonstration in which two photographs of a person were each dipped in one of two bowls, one labeled "soap" and the other "Zest." The photograph of the "soap" bowl had a scummy coating, whereas the one that came out of the "Zest" bowl had no such coating.

The brand experienced an upswing in sales in the 1980s and early 1990s, with the advertising slogan "You're not fully clean unless you're Zestfully clean!" coined by the BBDO sloganeer James Jordan. One commercial showed a teenage girl who used ordinary soap scratching her back against the metal pole of a school bus stop sign at her bus stop because her soap left a sticky film that she couldn't see but could certainly feel. While she is still scratching her back, the bus shows up. Yet another commercial featured NFL fullback Craig "Ironhead" Heyward promoting the Zest bodywash product: a liquid in a plastic bottle. Television commercials would incorporate the slogan as part of the jingle and end with someone displaying a towel with the "Zestfully clean" slogan on the back; these towels have often been given away in company promotions.

In 2007, in a seeming about-face of their 'no soap film' policy, Procter & Gamble discontinued the old product and relaunched Zest with a size reduced by 11% (from 4.5 to 4.0 ounces), a new bar shape, and a new, more intense fragrance. The product line was extended with the introduction of Zest body wash. A recent perusal of their support site yielded the following claim: "Zest Linen Fresh, Tropical Fresh, and Tangerine Mango Twist are no longer made with synthetic ingredients. They're 100% soap and have a new 'surf' shape."

At one time, the range of products marketed as Zest comprised Aqua Pure, Energy Fresh, Linen Fresh, Ultimate Clean (said to offer antibacterial action), Spring Burst, Tropical Fresh, and Whitewater Fresh; along with three liquid body washes, Spring Splash, Morning Garden, and Ocean Energy.

The Zest site now features several variants: Aqua-Pure, Aloe Splash, Ocean Energy (featuring Energizing Effects), Mint Explosion (featuring Stimulating Effects), Tangerine Mango Twist (featuring Stimulating Effects), and Whitewater Fresh (which was initially discontinued in 2006 but was brought back in 2012). Each variant was advertised as available as a bar and a bottled liquid labeled as "Bodywash".
