= Carsten Knobel =

German manager

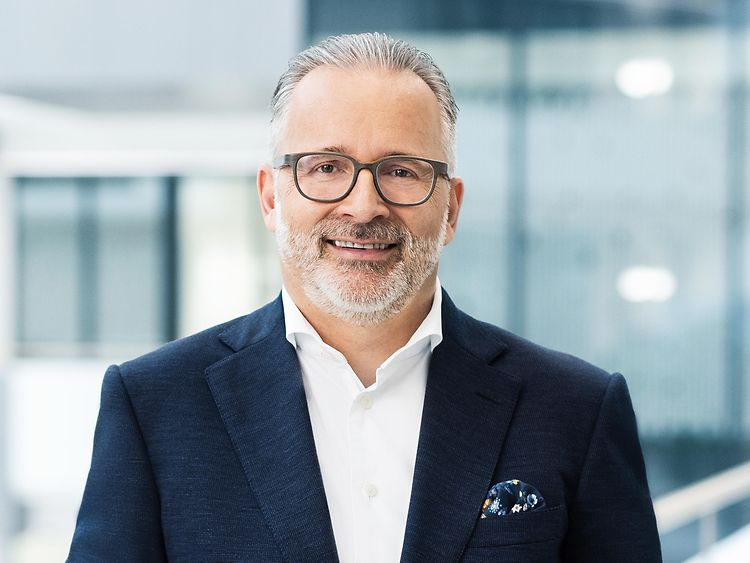
- Born: January 11, 1969 (age 57); Marburg, West Germany (now Germany)
- Education: Technische Universität Berlin
- Occupation: Manager
- Title: CEO of Henkel
- Term: 2020 – present

Carsten Knobel (born 11 January 1969 in Marburg) is a German manager who has been CEO of Henkel since 2020, a multinational consumer goods and industrial company listed in the German DAX index. Knobel is also a member of the supervisory board of Lufthansa.

== Early life and education ==
Knobel studied business administration and technical chemistry at Technische Universität Berlin with further Executive Education at Harvard Business School.

== Career ==
Knobel joined Henkel in 1995 and held various positions with increasing responsibility across the organization. In July 2012 he was appointed Executive Vice President Finance as CFO, being responsible for Finance, Purchasing and the Integrated Business Solutions division; at the age of 43, he was one of the youngest members of the management board of DAX companies. At the end of 2018, Knobel established a green credit line with a total volume of 1.5 billion euros for Henkel as the first German company. In April 2019, the Henkel CFO received the Corporate Finance Award of the Börsen-Zeitung for the innovative and sustainable financing method "Green Loan".

In October 2019, Knobel was appointed to succeed Hans Van Bylen as CEO of Henkel as of January 1, 2020. He resigned from his position as Deputy Chairman of the supervisory board of the Bundesliga Soccer Club Fortuna Düsseldorf at the end of 2019 in order to fully concentrate on his duties as chairman of the management board of Henkel.

== Other activities ==
=== Corporate boards ===
- Deutsche Bank, Member of the Supervisory Board (since 2026)
- Kühne Holding, Member of the Supervisory Board (since 2023)

=== Non-profit organizations ===
- Baden-Badener Unternehmer-Gespräche (BBUG), Member of the Board of Trustees
- Henkel Center for Consumer Goods (HCCG), WHU – Otto Beisheim School of Management, Member of the Advisory Board

== Personal life ==
Knobel is married and has two children.
