= Henkel North American Consumer Goods =

American company

Henkel Corporation

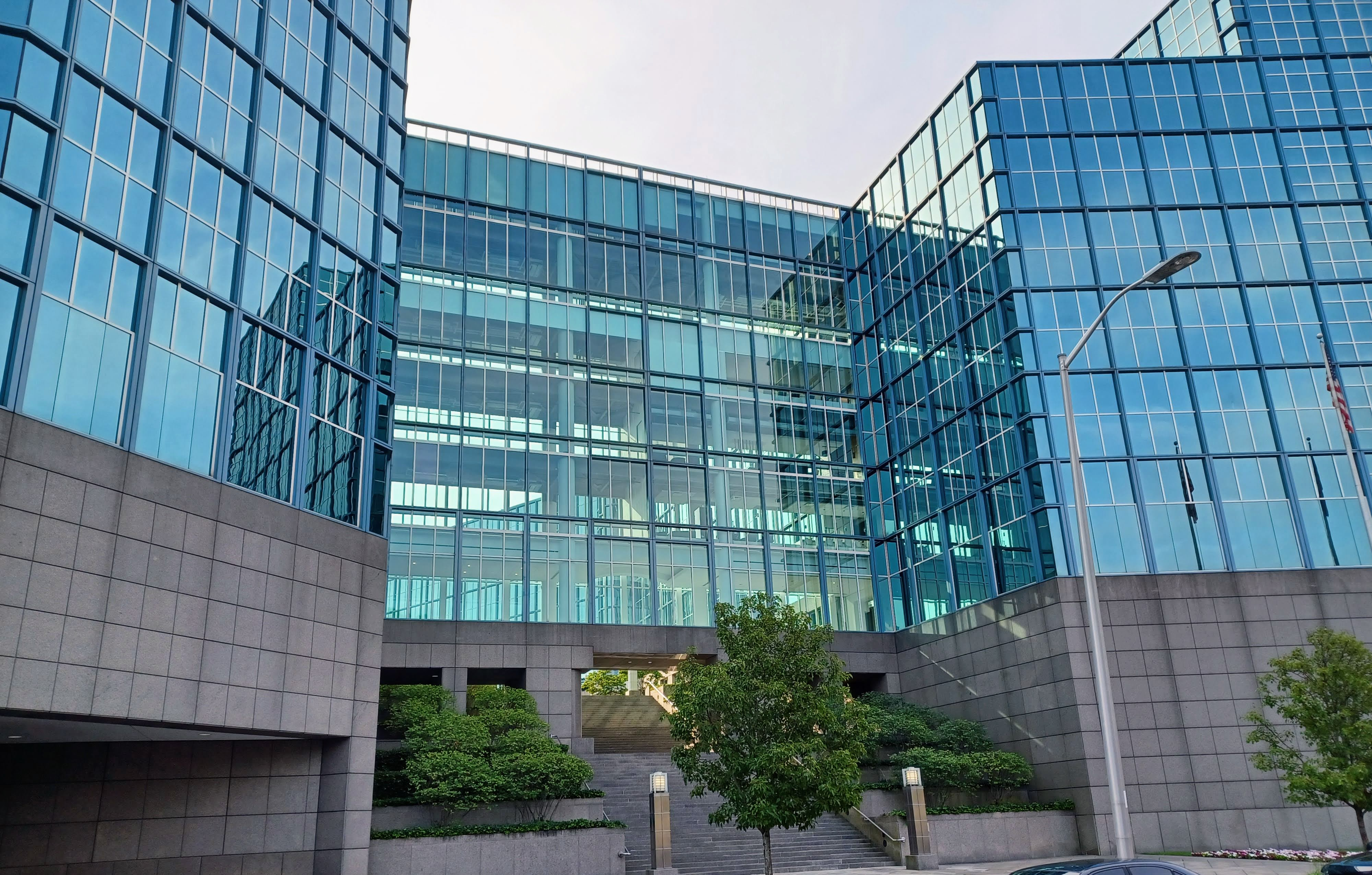
- Headquarters in Stamford, Connecticut
- Trade name: Henkel North American Consumer Goods
- Formerly: Armour-Dial Inc. (1967–1985); The Dial Corporation (1985–2017)
- Company type: Subsidiary
- Traded as: NYSE: DIAL (until 2004)
- Industry: Consumer brands, beauty products, and laundry care
- Founded: December 1967; 58 years ago
- Headquarters: Stamford, Connecticut, United States
- Products: Persil, Dial, Purex, Renuzit, Soft Scrub, Snuggle, Sun Products and Schwarzkopf Professional.
- Number of employees: 9,000
- Parent: Henkel AG & Co. KGaA
- Website: www.henkel-northamerica.com

Henkel Corporation, doing business as Henkel North American Consumer Goods and formerly The Dial Corporation, is an American company based in Stamford, Connecticut. It is a manufacturer of personal care and household cleaning products and is a subsidiary of multinational company Henkel AG & Co. KGaA (Henkel Consumer Goods Inc.).

Dial began as a brand of deodorant soap manufactured by Armour and Company, a Chicago, Illinois, meatpacking firm, and through a series of mergers, acquisitions, and divestitures, emerged by the 2000s as a stand-alone personal-care and household-cleaning products company. Henkel acquired The Dial Corporation in 2004. Dial soap remains one of the company's major brands.

== History ==
Dial was the first antibacterial soap introduced in the United States. It was developed by chemists from Armour and Company and introduced in the Chicago market in 1948. Armour had been producing soap since 1888, first as "Armour Family Soap." Armour's soap was made from tallow, a by-product of the meat production process. The name Dial was chosen because the soap advertised "'round-the-clock" protection against the odor caused by perspiration. Demand for this new soap exceeded expectations due to its deodorant effectiveness, its non-medicinal clover-like smell and bright golden yellow color. The brand was rolled out nationally in 1949, and in time became the leading deodorant soap brand in the United States.

=== Armour-Dial, Inc. (1967–1985) ===
Because of the popularity and strong sales of Dial soap, fueled by magazine, radio, and television advertising, Armour's consumer products business was incorporated as Armour-Dial, Inc. in 1967. In 1970, The Greyhound Corporation purchased Armour and Company (including Armour-Dial, Inc.) for $400 million as part of a diversification strategy and relocated its headquarters to Phoenix, Arizona, the following year.

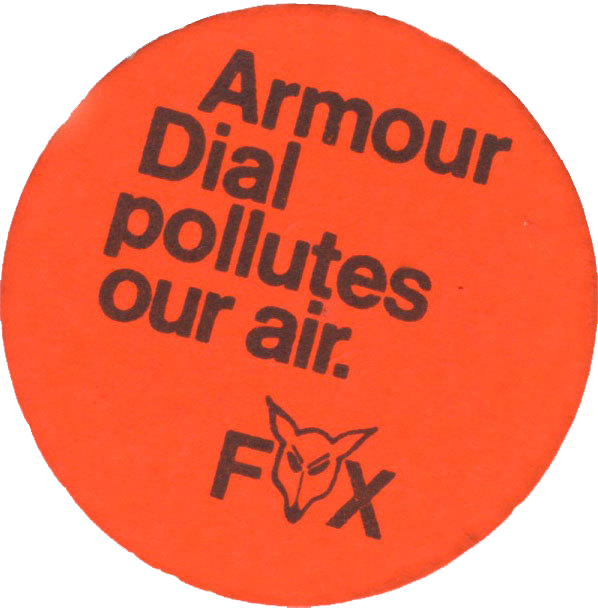
A bright-orange sticker created and distributed by Phillips for one of his direct action campaigns against Armour Dial

James F. Phillips (November 20, 1930 – October 3, 2001) was an American environmental activist known in the Chicago area during the 1960s for his environmental direct action under the pseudonym The Fox. Phillips discovered Armour-Dial had been polluting Mill Creek which emptied into the Fox River, which violated a 1962 law that limited the amount of chemicals companies could dump into the surrounding water. Phillips created stickers issuing warnings that read "Armour Dial Kills our Water" or "Armour Dial Pollutes our air". He organized a group to travel to supermarkets around the United States and put these stickers on bars of Dial soap. Mike Royko, a Pulitzer Prize winning Chicago newspaper columnist, called Phillips's attack "the most ambitious anti pollution prank of his colorful career." The prank was so successful, it started an independent boycott of all Armour-Dial products. Phillips's seven-year battle with Armour Dial led to the state of Illinois suing Armour Dial's Montgomery plant for violating Illinois pollution standards.

=== The Dial Corporation (1985–1995) ===
In 1985, Greyhound acquired the consumer products business of Purex Industries, Inc., which was combined with Armour-Dial to form The Dial Corporation.

In 1988, Greyhound acquired the Boraxo, Borateem and 20 Mule Team Borax brands from U.S. Borax.

To reflect the parent company's new focus after the sale of Greyhound Lines, Greyhound was renamed Greyhound Dial Corporation in 1990 and renamed again, to The Dial Corp the following year. After the parent company was renamed The Dial Corp, the Dial consumer business was known as The Dial Corp Consumer Products Group.

Greyhound also acquired Breck Shampoo from Shulton in 1990 and Renuzit from S. C. Johnson & Son in 1993.

=== The new Dial Corporation (1996–2017) ===
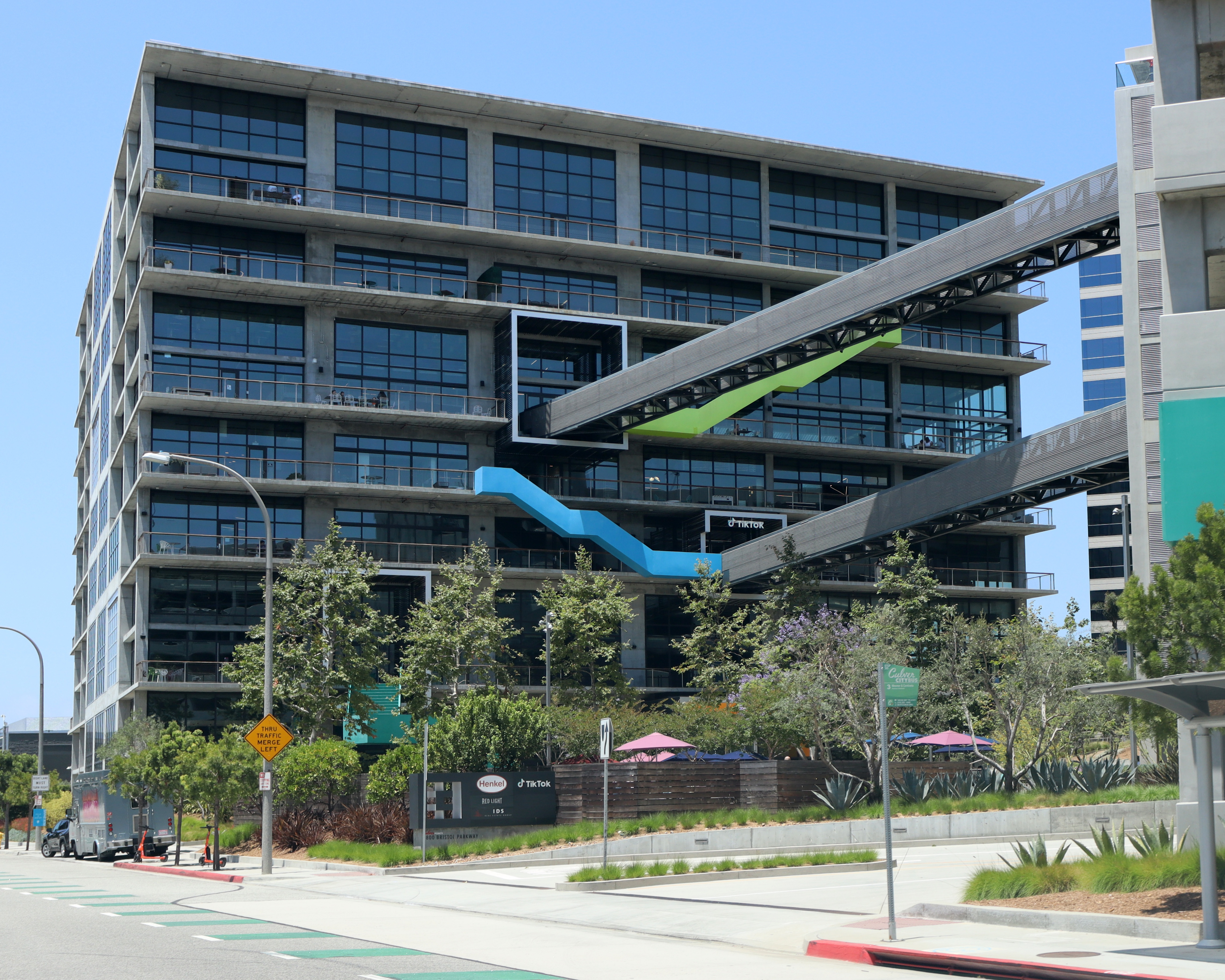
Henkel Beauty Care Hair Professional North America headquarters in Culver City, California, June 2024 (shared with TikTok)

In late 1995, parent company The Dial Corp announced its intention to split the company and spin off the Dial consumer products business. After the spin off, Dial's now former parent company was renamed Viad Corp, consisting of the service businesses. The Dial consumer business was reborn as the new Dial Corporation, relocating its corporate offices to Scottsdale, Arizona, adjacent to its long-time research and development facility. Under new CEO, Malcolm Jozoff, a former P&G executive, the new Dial Corporation underwent major layoffs in the fall of 1996 and a series of financially disastrous acquisitions the following four years.

In 1997, Dial sold the Brillo business to Church & Dwight.

Between 1999 and 2000, Dial formed two joint-ventures with German company Henkel. The first, Dial/Henkel LLC, was established in 1999 which introduced Purex Advanced laundry detergent and acquired Custom Cleaner home dry cleaning products. The second joint venture company, Dial/Henkel Mexico S.A. de C.V. was established for operations in Mexico. By 2002, both ventures were discontinued because of losses and Dial sold its stake in the Mexico venture to Henkel.

In 2000, Jozoff resigned and was replaced by Herbert Baum with a mandate from the board of directors to find a suitable buyer for the company. That same year, Dial acquired Coast soap and Zout stain remover.

In December 2003, Dial was acquired by Henkel for $2.9 billion. As a consequence of Henkel's acquisition of Dial, Henkel divested its 29% stake in The Clorox Company for $2.84 billion in cash and assets, which included the Soft Scrub and Combat brands.

In 2006, Dial acquired the Right Guard, Soft & Dri and Dry Idea deodorant brands from Procter & Gamble for $420 million.

On March 1, 2006, Dial completed the sale of its food business for $183 million to Pinnacle Foods. The food business produces shelf-stable canned meat products (such as potted meat and Vienna sausages) and ready meals under the Armour Star brand, had sales of approximately $230 million in fiscal 2005.

In 2012, Henkel sold Dial's Coast, Pure & Natural and Soft & Dri brands to Brynwood Partners' High Ridge Brands for an undisclosed amount.

In 2016, Henkel acquired laundry detergent manufacturer Sun Products for $3.6 billion.

In July 2017, Dial relocated its headquarters from Scottsdale, Arizona to Stamford, Connecticut in order to consolidate its operations with Sun Products and be closer to parent Henkel's North American headquarters (Henkel Corporation) in Rocky Hill, Connecticut. After consolidation, the business was renamed Henkel North American Consumer Goods in 2018.

=== Henkel Corporation (2018–present) ===
In June 2021, Henkel sold the Right Guard and Dry Idea deodorant brands to Thriving Brands LLC.

== Brands ==
Henkel's Consumer Goods brands include:

- all (laundry detergent)
- Boraxo (cleaning products)
- Breck (hair care)
- Combat (pest control)
- Dial (soap)
- got2b (hair care)
- Kenra (hair care)
- Persil (laundry detergent)
- Purex (laundry detergent)
- Renuzit (air freshener)
- Schwarzkopf (hair care)
- Soft Scrub (cleaning products)
- Smooth n' Shine (hair care)
- Spirit (soap) (no longer sold)
- Snuggle (fabric softner)
- Sunlight (cleaning products)
- Sun Products (cleaning products)
- Surf (laundry detergent) (North America)
- Tone (body soap)
- 20 Mule Team Borax (cleaning products)
