= Persil Power =

Unilever brand of laundry detergent

Persil Power was a laundry detergent product developed and sold in the mid-1990s by Unilever.

== History ==
In the early 1990s, Unilever's Persil detergent risked losing its market-leading position as independent tests were showing the major brands to have relatively similar performance in removing stains. Unilever decided that a new product with stain-removal properties could be more profitable. Persil's main competitor, Ariel, had recently introduced Ariel Ultra, the first of the "super compacts" — washing powders equipped with chemical catalysts which (according to the advertising) cleaned better than ever, with less powder. Given Ariel Ultra's success, and with Persil Micro System lagging, Unilever needed a new super-compact Persil line.

== Development ==
Unilever's research teams found a manganese(IV)-based catalyst that sped up the decomposition of sodium perborate and sodium percarbonate which act as bleaches in the washing process, increasing the cleaning performance noticeably and allowing use of lower temperatures. Unilever decided that the bleaching agents would be an ideal addition to the product, but had worries over such a major alteration to the formula of one of their main products. To this end, they decided to split the catalyst agent (together with some fabric softening agents) into a new product, Persil Power. In May 1994, Persil Power was launched with a large publicity campaign spearheaded by CEO heir-apparent Niall FitGerald, but a number of problems soon became apparent.

== Commercial failure ==
Despite the large publicity campaign, the sales of Persil and Persil Power did not significantly increase, because Persil by itself was capable of dealing with most stains. The most serious problem was that after a few washes with Persil Power, clothes first started to lose their colour definition and then their structural integrity, ripping easily under any significant stress. Effectively, washing clothes in Persil Power had the same effect as adding bleach to the clothes. Further testing determined that while the effects weren't apparent on new clothes (which Unilever had performed most of Persil Power's testing with) they could become very quickly apparent on older clothes. The effects were largely determined to be due to Persil Power being a little too powerful in the recommended quantities, and a chemical reaction (which Unilever had not detected) occurring between the catalyst agents and dyes used commonly in clothes. Subsequently, a hasty reformulation with less catalyst was released, but that too was suspected of causing problems and was equally mired by the bad publicity.

Considering the embarrassment the episode had caused Unilever and the prohibitive cost of redesigning the product, they decided to issue a product recall and then simply abandon the brand. A number of lawsuits were issued against Unilever by retail chains and consumers, but the vast majority of them were settled outside of court. Afterwards, Persil were able to refine their main product's formula enough to produce comparable cleaning performance without needing a catalyst. This led to a relaunch of the super-compact format as "New Generation Persil".
