= VC1 =

VC1 may refer to:

- VC-1, a video coding format
- VC-1A, the Brazilian Air Force One, the call sign of the aircraft carrying the President of Brazil
- Vickers VC.1 Viking, a British aircraft
- Videocipher 1, an analogue broadcast encoder
- First Vatican Council, a Catholic Church council convened in 1868
- Valkyria Chronicles (video game), a 2008 tactical role-playing video game
- Virtua Cop, a 1994 lightgun shooter video game

== See also ==
- VCI (disambiguation)
