= Hans Schwarzkopf =

German chemist and pharmacist (1874-1921)

- Born: 1874; Danzig, German Empire (now Gdańsk, Poland)
- Died: 1921 (aged 46–47); Berlin
- Occupations: Chemist, Entrepreneur, Inventor
- Organization: Schwarzkopf
- Known for: Founder of Schwarzkopf haircare brand
- Spouse: Martha Schwarzkopf
- Children: 3

Hans Schwarzkopf (1874, Danzig – 12 February 1921, Berlin) was a German chemist, entrepreneur, and inventor. He was the founder of the Schwarzkopf haircare brand, now owned by the Henkel brand.

== Life ==
Hans Schwarzkopf studied chemistry and in 1898 opened a "paint, drug and perfume shop" on Passauer Strasse in Berlin-Charlottenburg.

A customer in the UK had seen a shampoo in powder form and wanted him to order it for her. Schwarzkopf put the customer off several times, until at some point she stopped requesting it. He then came up with the idea of developing such a product himself. After several years of development, Schwarzkopf launched a powdered shampoo in 1904. It cost 20 pfennigs per bag (for one treatment), was dissolved in water, and proved to be superior to all hair-washing soaps available at the time in terms of convenience. The "shampoo with the black head" became the first branded hair cosmetic product in Germany. Due to the success, Schwarzkopf gave up his drugstore in the same year and concentrated on production and marketing.

After Schwarzkopf died, his wife Martha Schwarzkopf took over the management of the company and ran it until 1935, when she handed it over to her three sons. Open to innovation, she founded the "Schwarzkopf Hair Research Center" in 1927. In the same year, the company developed the first mass produced liquid shampoo.
