= Simone Bagel-Trah =

German businesswoman

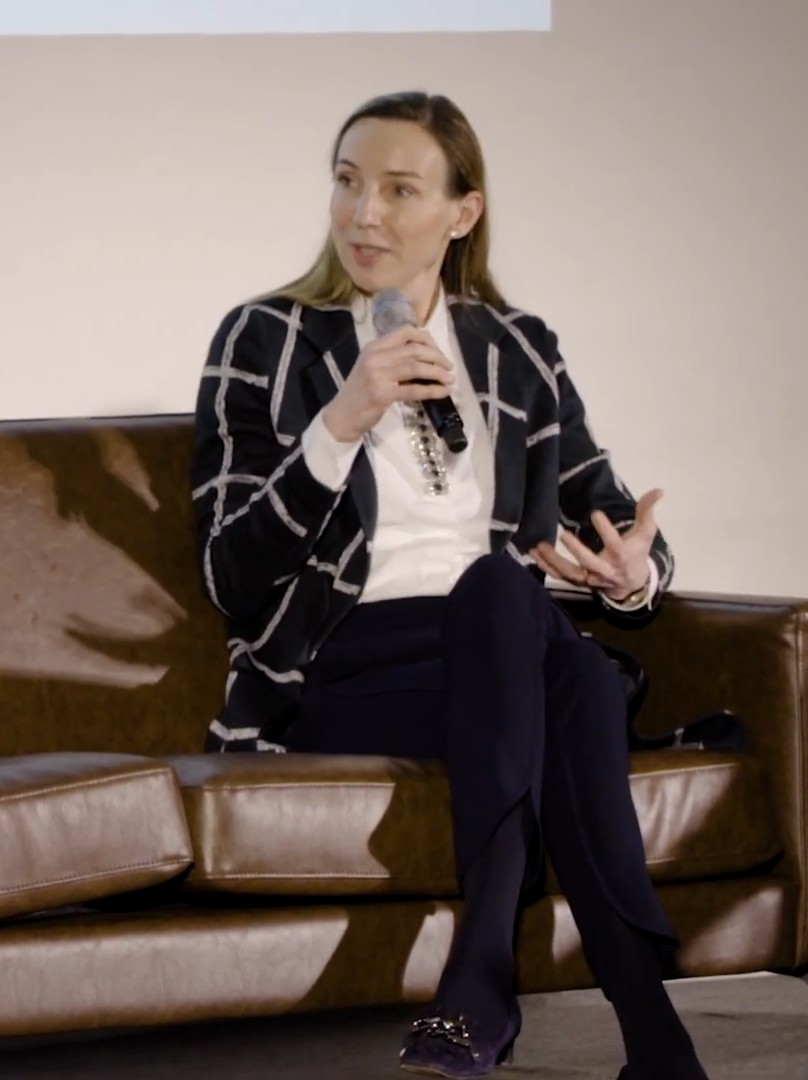
- Born: Bagel; 10 January 1969 (age 57); Düsseldorf, West Germany (now Germany)
- Occupation: Businessperson
- Spouse: Christoph Trah
- Children: 2

Simone Bagel-Trah (born 1969) is a German businesswoman who is chairwoman of the Supervisory Board and of the Shareholders' Committee of Henkel.

== Early life and education ==
Bagel-Trah's mother is Anja Bohlan, an economist and academic who published several books. Her father is Fritz Bagel. Bagel-Trah is a great-great-granddaughter of the Henkel founder Fritz Henkel.

Bagel-Trah graduated from the Max Planck Gymnasium in Düsseldorf in 1988. From 1988 to 1993 she studied biology at the University of Bonn. In 1998, she received her doctorate.

== Career ==
From 1998 to 2000 Bagel-Trah worked as an independent consultant for project management in the field of microbiology and pharmacy. In 2000, she became Managing Partner of Antiinfectives Intelligence GmbH in Rheinbach. She is a founding member of the since 6 December 2007 existing University Council of Heinrich Heine University of Düsseldorf.

Since 30 April 2001, Bagel-Trah has been a member of the Supervisory Board of Henkel AG & Co. KGaA. As of 14 April 2008, she was the deputy chairman. On 22 September 2009, she took over the chairmanship, making her the first woman on this position in a DAX-listed company. At the same time she also became Chairman of the Shareholders' Committee, whose members include non-family managers also five Henkel heirs and which combines the interests of the three Henkel family members. Between 2014 and 2024 she was member of the Supervisory Board of Bayer AG. In 2025, Simone Bagel-Trah was appointed as a non-executive director of Chanel.

== Awards ==
Bagel-Trah was named as one of the "75 most influential women in German Business" by Manager Magazin and Boston Consulting Group (BCG) in 2017.

In 2020, Bagel-Trah was honored by the strategy consulting firm Boston Consulting Group (BCG) and the business magazine Manager Magazin as the most influential woman in German business of 2019 and named "Prima inter Pares 2019".

== Other activities ==
=== Corporate boards ===
- Chanel, Non-Executive Director (since 2025)
- Heraeus, Member of the Supervisory Board (since 2011)
- Commerzbank, Member of the Central Advisory Board
- HSBC Trinkaus & Burkhardt, Member of the Advisory Board
- Bayer AG, Member of the Supervisory Board (2014–2024)

=== Non-profit organizations ===
- Max Planck Society, Member of the Senate
- University of Düsseldorf (HHU), Member of the Board of Trustees
- Düsseldorf Business School, Member of the Board of Trustees
- Stifterverband für die Deutsche Wissenschaft, Vice Chairwoman of the Board
- Fritz Henkel Foundation, Chairwoman of the Board of Directors
- Foundation for Family Businesses, Member of the Board of Trustees
- Rotary International, Member

== Personal life ==
Simone Bagel-Trah is married to Christoph Trah (born1966), and they have two children.
