= Rinso =

Brand name of laundry soap

- Product type: Laundry detergent
- Current owner: Unilever
- Country: United Kingdom
- Introduced: 1908; 118 years ago
- Related brands: Surf
- Markets: Worldwide

Rinso is a brand name of laundry soap and detergent marketed by Unilever. The brand was created by Robert Spear Hudson and originally branded Hudson's Soap, which was sold to Lever Brothers of Port Sunlight, England, in 1908. It was introduced in the United States by Lever Brothers Company in 1918.

== History ==
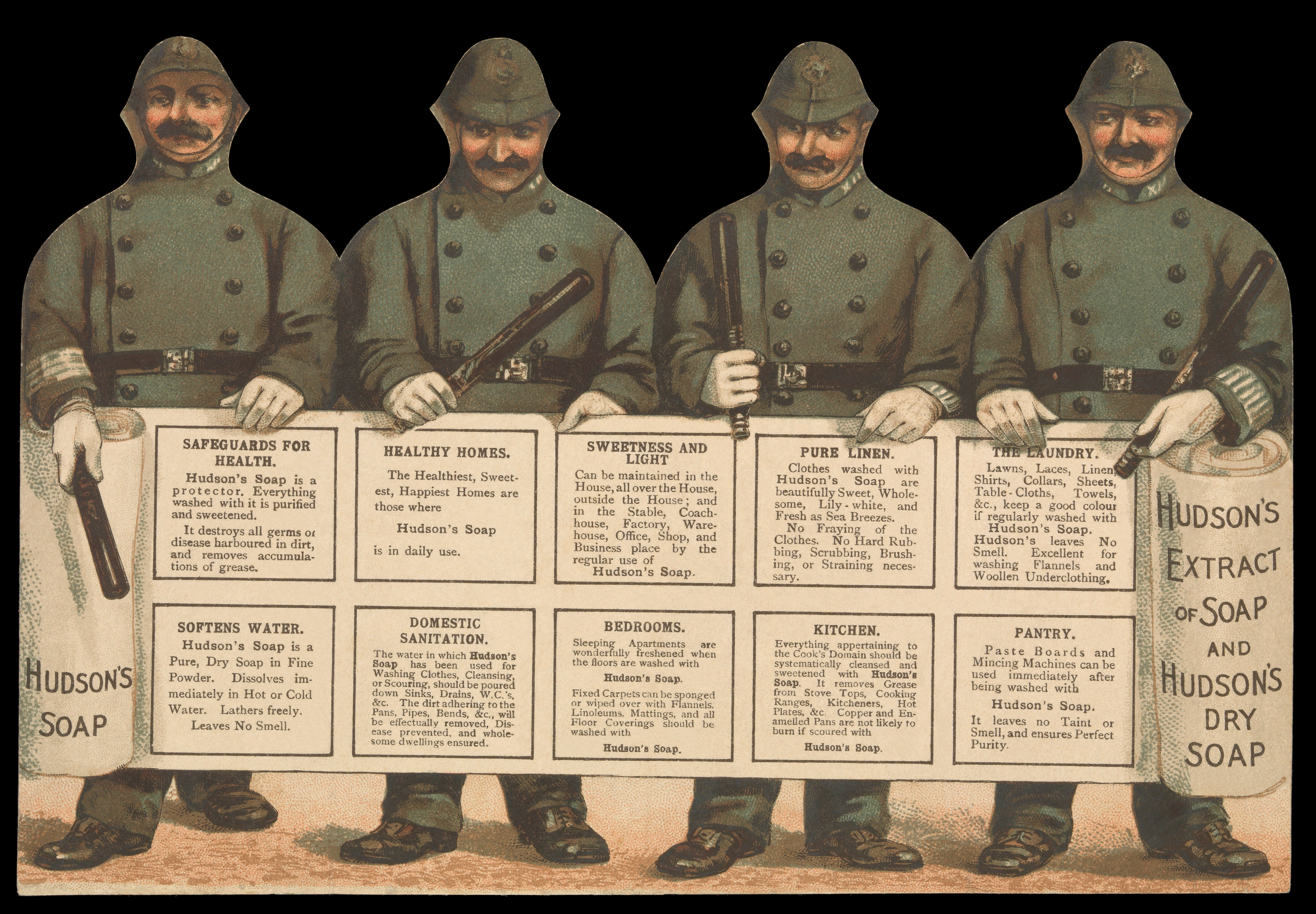
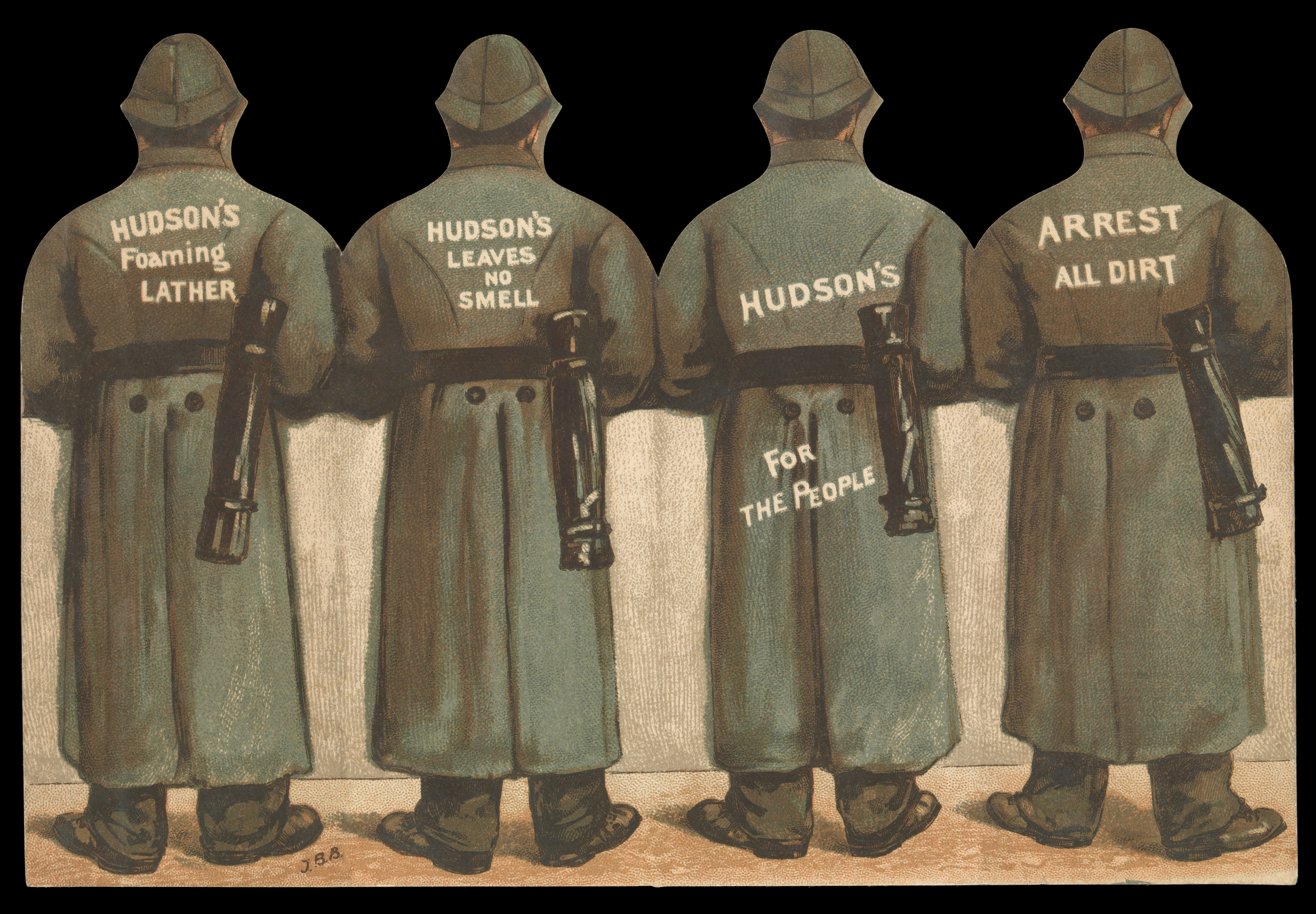
A 1910s advertisement for Hudson's Soap

Rinso was one of the first mass-marketed soap powders. It was advertised widely on United States radio, being the sponsor of many radio programs such as the popular daytime soap opera Big Sister from 1936 to 1946, the dramatic anthology Grand Central Station from 1940 to 1942, the night-time programs Big Town from 1937 to 1942, Mayor of the Town from 1942 to 1943, and most notably The Amos 'n' Andy Show from 1943 to 1950. During this time the product's advertisements happily chanted the slogan "Rinso white, Rinso bright" and boasted that Rinso contained "Solium, the sunlight ingredient". In 1936 the sponsored show Rinso Music Hall was recorded in London and broadcast on Radio Luxembourg and Radio Normandie, followed from 1937 to 1939 by the popular Rinso Radio Revue.

The product's claim to better rinsing was due to its incorporation of sodium silicate as a buffer rather than, or in addition to, the more commonly used sodium carbonate. The hard water calcium precipitate formed with metasilicate tends to be finer and hence less likely to be trapped in cloth than the chalky calcium carbonate.

In the 1950s, sales plummeted when a new detergent, Tide, manufactured by rival Procter & Gamble, proved to be much more popular. Rinso was revamped in the early 1950s as a detergent with added bluing agent, and was branded and distinctively packaged as Rinso Blue, to differentiate it from the still available Rinso White soap powder. By the mid-1960s the soap product was discontinued. The detergent was again reformulated, and given a new name, Sunshine Rinso. The justification for the name change was that the new and improved Rinso now had "sunshine whiteners". There was heavy ad backing (for example, a heavily played commercial during this time period was a pop version of a Sunshine Rinso jingle, set to You Are My Sunshine). Sales did not improve appreciably, and Rinso eventually disappeared from store shelves by the mid-1970s, although the liquid detergent Rinso Blue could still be seen on American shelves as recently as the late 1980s.

In 1953 it was the first laundry soap brand introduced in Brazil. Despite being out of production in the country for decades, "Rinso" is still slang for "laundry soap" in some areas in the south of Brazil.

In 1992, the Southern California-based 99 Cents Only Stores purchased the rights to the name "Rinso" from Unilever for use in the United States. Rinso brand cleaning supplies were prominently displayed in their stores.

The Rinso brand was replaced by Unilever with Surf in its four major markets. However, Rinso is still made by Unilever for the Turkish, Asian, and Central American markets. In September 1970, Rinso was launched in Indonesia as the nation's first detergent brand. As of 2013, Rinso leads the Indonesian detergent market.
