= Persil =

German brand of laundry detergent

- Persil logo used by Henkel (top) and Unilever (bottom)
- Product type: Laundry detergent
- Current owner: Henkel, licensee: Unilever
- Country: Germany (Henkel) & United Kingdom (Unilever)
- Introduced: 1907; 119 years ago
- Related brands: Wipp; Dixan; Le Chat or Skip (France); Rinso (Indonesia); Via (Sweden); Bǎoyíng (寶瀅) (Taiwan)
- Markets: Albania, Austria, Canada, China, Cyprus, Egypt, France, Germany, Greece, Ireland, Israel, Italy, Lebanon, Mexico, Netherlands, New Zealand, Poland, Portugal, Romania, Saudi Arabia, Serbia, Spain, Syria, Taiwan, Turkey, United Kingdom, United States, Ukraine, Russia,Iran
- Previous owners: Henkel & Cie
- Website: www.henkel.com

Persil ((UK) /ˈpɜːrsɪl/, (US) /pɜːrˈsɪl/, German pronunciation: [pɛʁˈziːl]) is a brand of laundry detergent manufactured and marketed by two (unrelated) companies Henkel of Germany and Unilever of the United Kingdom. Unilever manufacture and market the brand in the United Kingdom, Ireland, France, Latin America (except Mexico), China, Australia and New Zealand. In all other countries Persil is manufactured and marketed by Henkel. Persil was introduced in 1907 by Henkel. It was the first commercially available laundry detergent that combined bleach with the detergent. The name was derived from two of its original ingredients, sodium perborate and sodium silicate.

== History ==
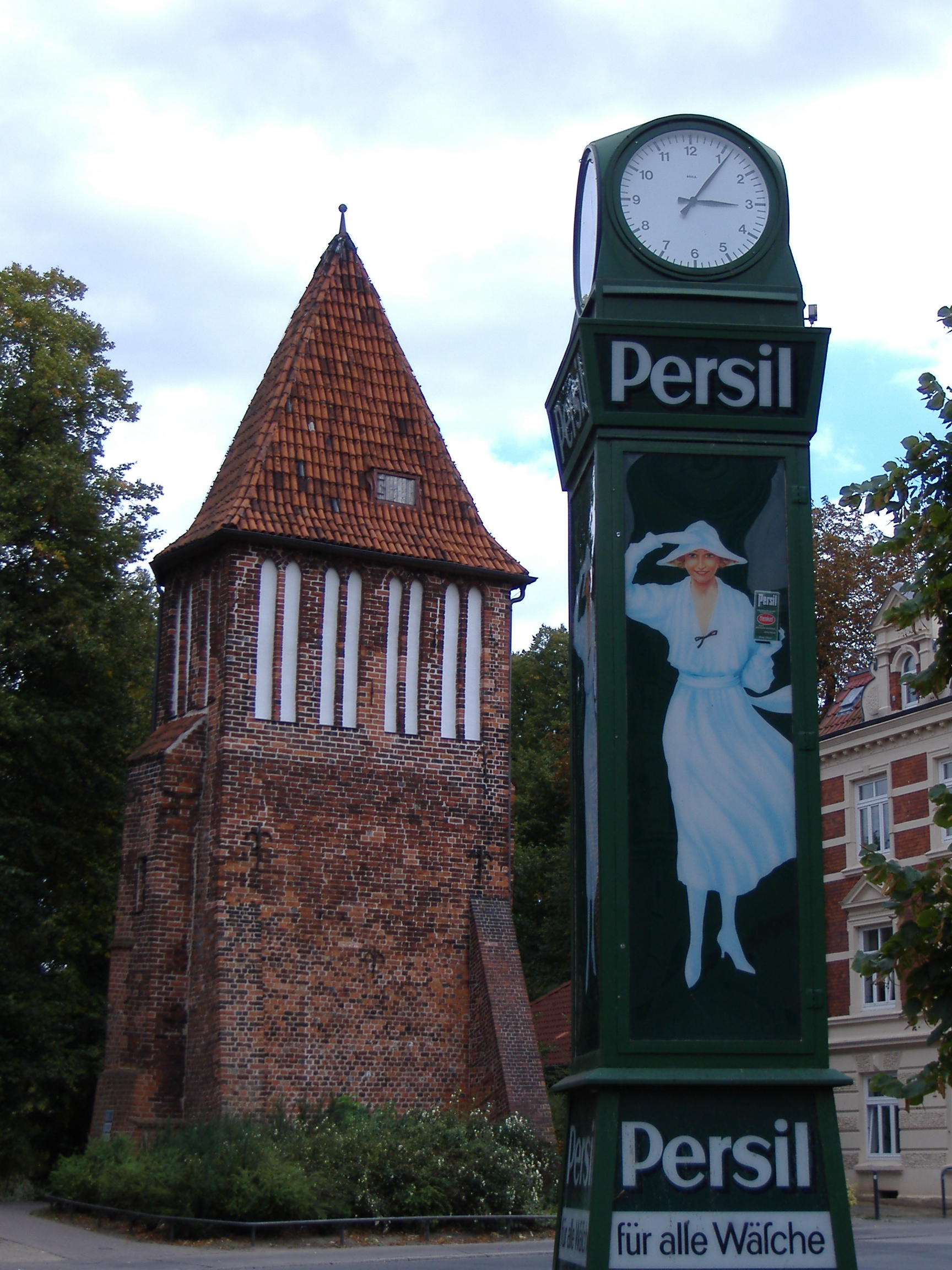
Persil advertisement in Wismar

The chore of washing the laundry began to change with the introduction of washing powders in the 1880s. These new products originally were simply pulverized soap. New cleaning product marketing successes, such as the 1890s introduction of Gold Dust Washing Powder (created by industrial chemist James Boyce for the N. K. Fairbank Company in the United States), proved that there was a ready market for better cleaning agents. Henkel & Cie, founded in Düsseldorf in 1876, pursued the opportunity, and on 6 June 1907 launched the first of its kind product, Persil. The manufacturer had found a method to add sodium perborate—a bleaching agent—to its base washing agents (silicate), creating what the marketing department called a "self-activating powder" detergent. During the washing process, oxygenated perborate forms small bubbles, doing the "work of the washboard"—saving consumers time and rendering the historic method of "sun-bleaching" (by laying clothes out in the sun) unnecessary.

Persil was the first commercially available laundry detergent that combined bleach with the detergent. The invention of Persil was a significant breakthrough. The name, "Persil", is derived from two of the original ingredients, sodium perborate and silicate. This name was however deemed unsuitable as an international brand because the pronunciation of this spelling is not clear or easy in some languages. Coincidentally, persil is the French word for the herb parsley.

In France, the Marseillais Jules Ronchetti launched a soap under the brand "Le Persil" in 1906. During the First World War, the company of Electro-Chimie, concessionaire for France of the Henkel laundry, signed an agreement with Ronchetti by which it would no longer sell detergents under the Persil brand. A legal battle ensued which resulted in an agreement in 1927 reserving the use of the mark to the English company Lever Brothers (which bought the company from Jules Ronchetti) in France and the United Kingdom, and to the German company Henkel in the rest of the world.

Persil is sold in powder, liquid detergent, liquid capsule, gel, and tablet forms. There are enzymatic, non-enzymatic, and colour care (containing enzymes, but bleach-free) formulations as well. The Persil line also includes specialist care products for wool and silk items. Additionally in the UK, Unilever formerly marketed a range of Persil washing up liquids.

== Markets, licensing and distribution ==
=== Henkel ===
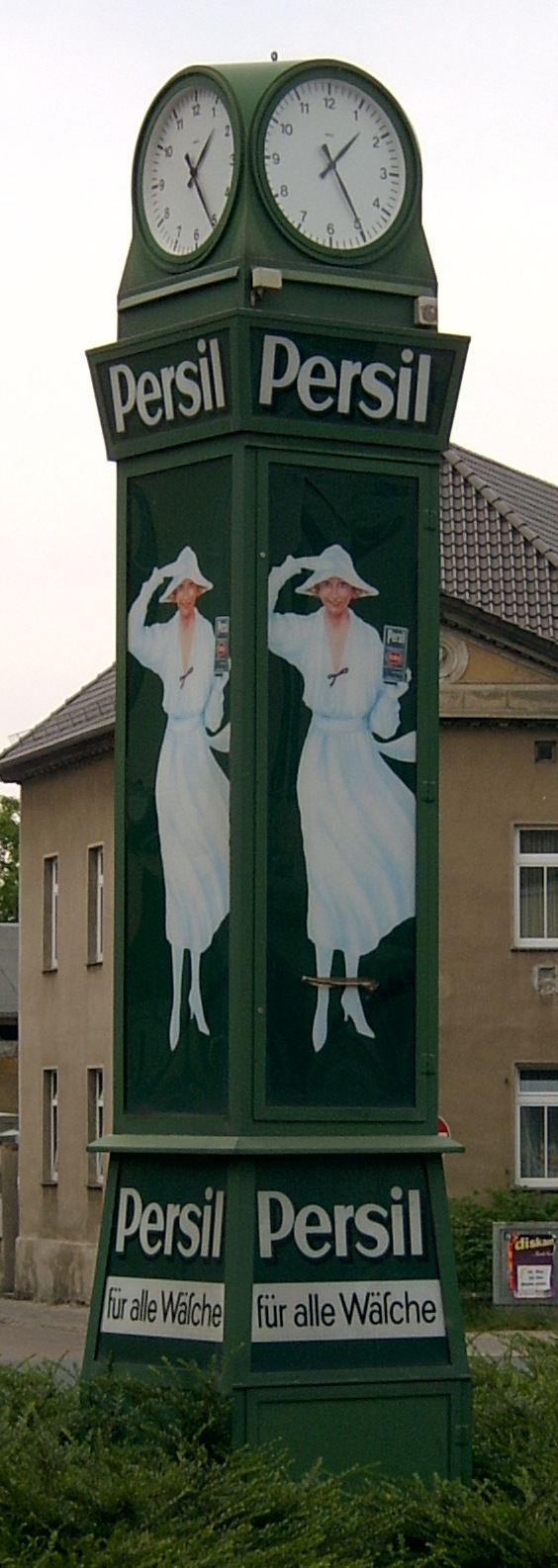
The Persil clock in Köthen, Germany

Henkel AG manufactures, distributes, and markets Persil in Germany, Poland and most of Europe, Egypt, Lebanon, Saudi Arabia, Syria, the United States and Canada.

Henkel markets Persil under the name "Dixan" in Greece, Italy and Cyprus; and under the name "Wipp" in Spain and China. In Belgium, where both Henkel's Persil and Dixan can be found at major retailers, the Persil brand name is given priority by Henkel in its marketing. Henkel sells its Persil formulation in France under the name "Le Chat", as Unilever owns the licence to the Persil trademark in that country.

For a time, upscale German appliance manufacturer Miele acted as a direct importer of Henkel's Persil products into Canada and the United States, where they could be purchased only at licensed appliance dealers. It was marketed as a premium German detergent that was the "officially recommended" detergent for its washing machines. Due to this exclusive import agreement and specialty positioning at appliance dealerships, it retailed for up to $40/box in Canada. It was later replaced by Miele's own brand laundry products.

In April 2007, Henkel announced a global relaunching of the Persil brand and packaging to mark its 100th anniversary. Persil's other sub-brands (Le Chat, Dixan, and Wipp) were to be redesigned shortly afterward.

Persil was introduced to Mexico in 2011.

In March 2015, Henkel introduced Persil ProClean in the United States, a line of premium detergents available in Power-Liquid, Power-Caps and Power-Pearls. It was initially sold exclusively at Walmart stores.

In June 2016, Henkel acquired Sun Products, the manufacturer of Wisk, and soon discontinued Wisk and replaced it with Persil.

Persil ProClean was released in Canada in 2016. Power Pearls and liquid are available, including a Canada-only cold water liquid version. Caps are also available. In the United States, Persil is sold in liquid and pack form.

=== Unilever ===
Unilever markets Persil in the United Kingdom, Ireland, France, Latin America (except Mexico), Malaysia, Singapore, China, and New Zealand (but not Australia) since acquiring rights to the brand (one of its first such acquisitions) in 1931. Unilever also sells Persil in France. In this market, the brand focuses on "natural" ingredients and "skin-friendly" formulations. Persil, Skip, Breeze, Surf, Ala and Rinso serve as the local version in these markets of Unilever's other international detergent brand Omo.

In 2007 Unilever launched its new Persil Small and Mighty variant in the UK and Ireland. A 2013 update showcased a new design of bottle that enabled consumers to use the flexible plastic ball as a measurer and stain removal pre-treatment device. The ball was contained in a circular cutout in the centre of the bottle and simply filled and placed directly into the drum. As it was made of soft heat resistant plastic, it could be washed with the laundry and made no banging noises. This campaign was launched with the tagline "For whatever life throws". The bottle was redesigned in 2020 to include recycled plastic and the dosing device removed.

== See also ==
- Persil Power
- Persil Service
- Persilschein
