= Purex Crystals =

Purex Crystals are a crystal-form in-wash "fragrance booster" (and formerly a crystal-form in-wash fabric softener) manufactured by Henkel and marketed in the United States and Canada.

== Former fabric softener product ==
Introduced in 2011, the Purex Crystals product was the first crystal-form fabric softener sold in the United States. According to an article in Good Housekeeping, the Purex Crystals fabric softener could safely be used on active wear and children's polyester sleepwear without harming flame resistance properties. In January 2013, the company launched a version made specifically for babies.

== Fragrance booster and laundry detergent products ==
As of February 2022, the Purex website refers to Purex Crystals brand products as "fragrance boosters" rather than fabric softeners, as they did previously.

The company also uses "Purex With Crystals" as a branding label for liquid and powdered laundry detergent.

== Marketing award ==
Zooka Creative, the marketing team behind the launch of the Purex Crystals fabric softener product, won a Gold Effie Award from Effie Worldwide in 2012.

== See also ==
- Purex (laundry detergent)
