= VCI =

VCI may refer to:

== Organisations ==
- Vaccination Credential Initiative, Digital Vaccine Record coalition
- Veterinary Council of India
- Video Collection International, a UK company
- Volunteer Centres Ireland
- German Chemical Industry Association Verband der Chemischen Industrie e.V.

== Schools ==
- Valencia Colleges (Bukidnon) Inc.

== Science and technology ==
- Virtual channel identifier, in telecommunications
- VideoCipher I, a variant of the Videocipher scrambling system
- Volatile corrosion inhibitor or vapor corrosion inhibitor, a type of corrosion inhibitor

== Other uses ==
- AMX-VCI (Véhicule de Combat d'Infanterie), a tank
- Verbal Comprehension Index, in the WAIS-IV test

== See also ==
- VC1 (disambiguation)
