= Sunlight (cleaning product) =

Brand of laundry soap and detergent

- Product type: Laundry soap; Laundry detergent; Dishwashing detergent
- Current owner: Unilever (except United States and Canada); Henkel North American Consumer Goods (United States and Canada); Pental (Australia)
- Country: United Kingdom
- Introduced: 1884; 142 years ago
- Markets: Worldwide

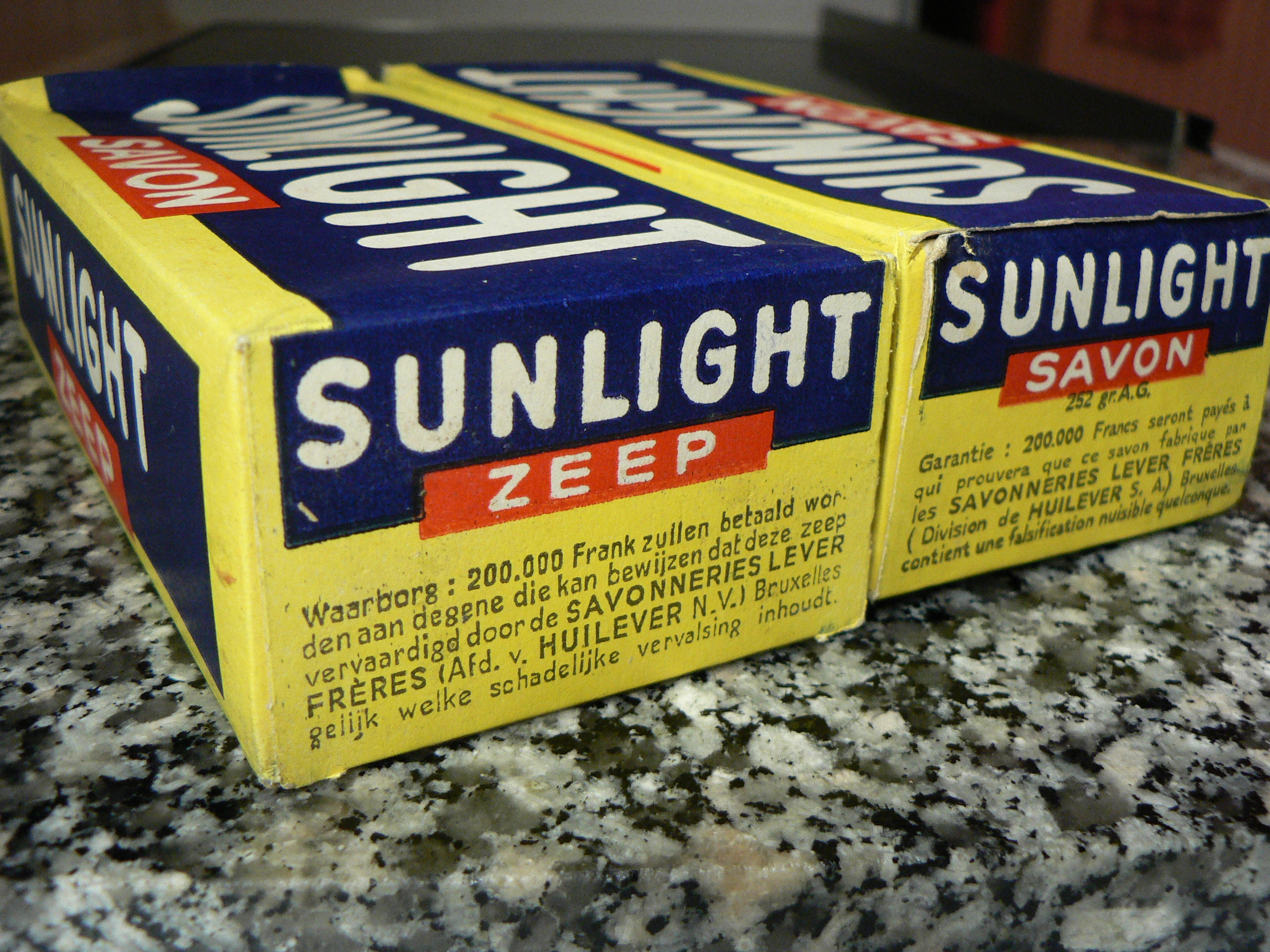
Sunlight Soap packages from Belgium.

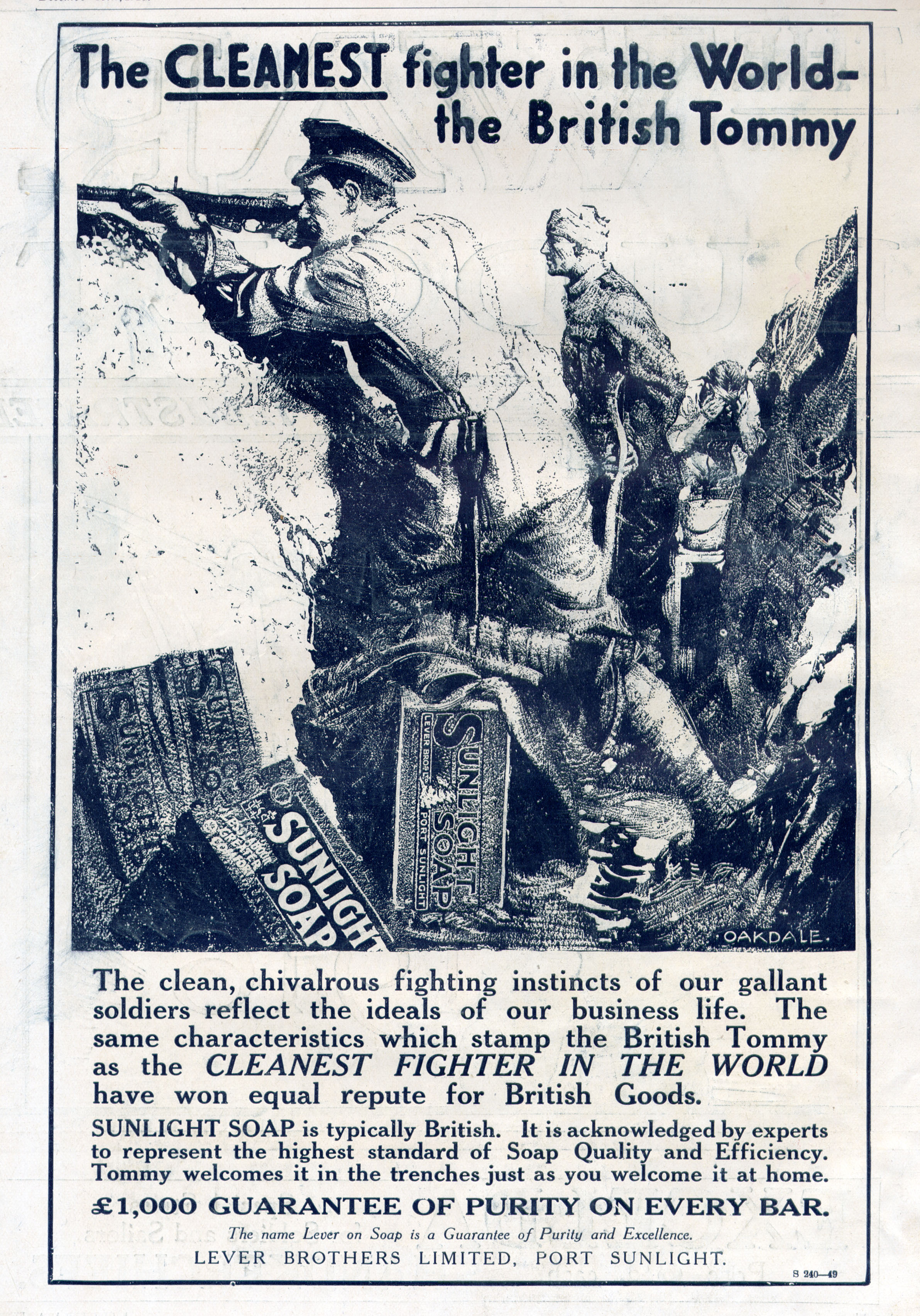
Sunlight Soap ad in the trenches of WW I (1915)

Sunlight is a brand of laundry soap, laundry detergent and dishwashing detergent manufactured and marketed around the world by Unilever, except in the United States and Canada, where it has been owned by Sun Products (now Henkel Corporation) since 2010.

== History ==
Sunlight household soap was introduced by the British company Lever Brothers in 1884. It was the world's first packaged, branded laundry soap. Designed for washing clothes and general household use, the success of the product led to the name of the company's village for its workers, Port Sunlight. The soap formula was invented by a Bolton chemist named William Hough Watson, who also became an early business partner. Watson's process created a new soap, using glycerin and vegetable oils, such as palm oil, rather than tallow (animal fats). William Lever and his brother James Darcy Lever invested in Watson's soap invention, and its initial success came from offering bars of cut, wrapped, and branded soap in his father's grocery shop. This was an early labour-saving device for the housewife as commercially made soap was bought in long bars before this. Sunlight soap was eventually supplanted by modern products made from synthetically produced detergents rather than naturally derived soaps.

The soap's appearance in Lumière Brothers films may be an early example of product placement. In 1971, Lever rebranded Sunlight as a washing-up liquid in the UK. The new packaging for Sunlight Lemon Liquid had a large picture of a lemon and only featured the words "washing up liquid" in small letters. There were complaints that children might mistake the product for lemon squash and drink it. The matter was discussed in the House of Lords. The company responded by changing its packaging.

In several markets (e.g., Belgium and the Netherlands), Sunlight soap has survived as a personal wash product rather than a laundry detergent.

Sunlight is still used in some markets as a brand by Unilever (the successor of Lever Brothers). In Sri Lanka, Sunlight laundry soap has a market share of more than 75%, and won the "brand of the year" award in 2004. South Africans use the brand for bath soap, dishwashing liquid, washing powder, and fabric conditioner.

The brand was also used in the Philippines during the 1990s as detergents. It was discontinued until it was revived in 2015 as a liquid dishwashing detergent traded alongside the Surf line.

However, production for Ireland and the UK ceased in 2009 due to low demand; it is available only as an import. In Norway, it was taken over by Lilleborg in 1930.

In 2003, exclusive licensing rights to the Sunlight brand for dishwashing detergents in the United States, Canada, and Puerto Rico were sold along with several Unilever brands to Lehman Brothers Merchant Banking Group, which established Phoenix Brands LLC for the purpose. In 2008, the North American trademark rights to Unilever laundry brands including Sunlight were acquired by Sun Products Corporation. In early 2010, Sun Products acquired the American and Canadian business rights to the Sunlight brand. Sun Products was itself acquired by Henkel North American Consumer Goods in 2016. As of 2024, Henkel discontinued dishwashing products in Canada; only the laundry products remain.

The Sunlight brand was used by JohnsonDiversey Professional Products in Canada and the USA in 2011.

In Turkey in the summer of 2010, washing-up liquids produced under the brand Cif began marketing with the new compound brand Sunlight Cif. As well as the regular liquid, a concentrated washing-up liquid was introduced in three varieties (lime, lemon, and orange); when it comes into contact with water, it turns into a gel which remains in the sponge longer than regular washing-up liquid.

== See also ==
- Ivory soap
