= Purex (laundry detergent) =

Brand of laundry detergent manufactured by Henkel

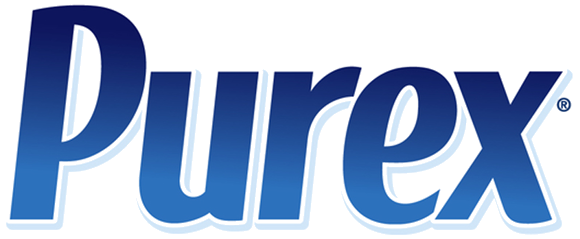
- Product type: Laundry detergent
- Current owner: Henkel North American Consumer Goods
- Country: Introduced as Purex Bleach in Los Angeles, California, U.S.
- Introduced: 1922; 104 years ago
- Related brands: Purex Bleach
- Markets: United States, Canada
- Previous owners: Purex Industries, Inc.
- Website: www.purex.com

Purex is a brand of laundry detergent and laundry-related products manufactured by Henkel North American Consumer Goods and marketed in the United States and Canada. Purex is one of the most widely used laundry detergents in North America. Its original product, Purex Bleach, was a major competitor to Clorox bleach. The brand name is also used for a line of in-wash "fragrance booster" products called Purex Crystals. The Purex Crystals brand was originally launched as an in-wash fabric softener product.

== History ==
In 1922, Lionel S. Precourt and his son, Ray, began to make household bleach from their 400-square-foot (37 m^{2}) garage behind their family home in Los Angeles, California. The following year, the name Purex was adopted for their bleach product. By 1946, Purex began to produce its first light-duty, dry detergent, under the brand name Trend.

In 1955, Purex acquired Old Dutch Cleanser from Cudahy Packing Company. On July 31, 1956, Purex acquired the Manhattan Soap Company best known for its "SweetHeart" soap. In 1962, Purex acquired The Campana Company of Batavia, Illinois, from the Dow Chemical Company. The same year, it merged with Brillo Manufacturing Company, makers of Brillo Pad.

In 1975, Purex liquid laundry detergent was introduced. Purex liquids began the use of its distinctive blue plastic bottle in 1981.

In 1981, Purex acquired the food and household brands of A. E. Staley Manufacturing Company, among them, Cream Corn Starch, Staley Pancake and Waffle Syrup, Sta-Puf fabric softener, Sta-Flo liquid starch and Sno Bol toilet bowl cleaner.

In 1982, Purex Industries, Inc. was acquired in a leveraged buyout by Gibbons, Green and van Amerongen Ltd., the predecessor of Leonard Green & Partners. In 1985, the household and consumer products business of Purex Industries, Inc. was acquired by Greyhound Corporation and was combined with Greyhound's Armour-Dial to form The Dial Corporation. By the 1990s, Dial would discontinue the Purex Bleach product to focus on laundry detergents.

In April 2004, The Dial Corporation was acquired by Henkel.

== See also ==
- Purex Crystals
