= Wisk =

American brand of laundry detergent

- Product type: Laundry detergent
- Current owner: Henkel
- Country: United States
- Introduced: 1956; 70 years ago
- Discontinued: 2017; 9 years ago
- Markets: United States, Canada
- Previous owners: Unilever
- Tagline: Ring Around The Collar
- Website: http://www.wisk.com

Wisk was an American brand of laundry detergent manufactured in the United States by Unilever (1956 to 2008) and Sun Products (2008 to 2017).

== History ==
Wisk was introduced as the first liquid laundry detergent in the United States by Lever Brothers Company in 1956.

In 2008, Wisk was purchased by Vestar Capital Partners when Lever Brothers' parent company Unilever divested its North American laundry brands, and it was combined with Huish Detergents, Inc. (also owned by Vestar) to form The Sun Products Corporation.

In 2010, Wisk was re-launched in a new formulation, with new packaging that declared "Stain Spectrum Technology" and emphasized its ability to fight tough stains. An advertising campaign was launched around the same time, focused on the "science of stain fighting". The brand came in a variety of formulations, including "Deep Clean", "High Efficiency", "Fresh Boost" and "Oxi Complete".

In June 2016, Henkel acquired Sun Products and discontinued Wisk in favor of its own Persil brand.

== Marketing ==
The brand was widely known for its successful "Ring Around The Collar" campaign introduced in 1968, spotlighting sometimes-difficult to treat stains that appeared on shirt collars, and the product's ability to help fight them. The campaign was created by BBDO. The nagging sing-song voiceover of "Ring around the collar!" was performed by Bob McFadden. The campaign was criticized decades later for being misogynistic, with the implication that it was the fault of wives that their husbands left home with dirty collars.
