= Alberto-Culver =

American hair and beauty products company (1955–2010)

Alberto-Culver Company
- Type: Public
- Traded as: NYSE: ACV
- Founded: 1955; 71 years ago
- Founder: Leonard H. Lavin
- Defunct: 2010; 16 years ago
- Fate: Acquired by Unilever
- Headquarters: 2525 Armitage Avenue, Melrose Park, Illinois, U.S.
- Area served: Worldwide
- Key people: Carol Lavin Bernick (Executive Chairman); Vincent J. Marino (President and CEO)
- Revenue: ▲US$1.60 billion (FY 2010)
- Operating income: ▲US$218 million (FY 2010)
- Net income: ▲US$155 million (FY 2010)
- Total assets: ▲US$1.88 billion (FY 2010)
- Total equity: ▲US$1.32 billion (FY 2010)
- Number of employees: 2,600 (September 30, 2010)
- Website: www.alberto.com

Alberto-Culver was an American corporation with international sales whose principal business was manufacturing hair and skin beauty care products under such brands as Alberto VO5, Andrew Collnge, St. Ives (skin care products), TRESemmé, FDS, Consort, Nexxus, Toni, and White Rain. It was a manufacturer in the ethnic beauty care market with such brands as Soft & Beautiful, Just For Me, Motions, and TCB. It was purchased by Unilever in 2010.

== History ==
The company originated as a Los Angeles beauty supply house with some proprietary products founded by Blaine Culver. The house chemist was named Alberto hence the name Alberto-Culver. Alberto-Culver was purchased and reorganized in 1955 by Leonard H. Lavin for $400,000. Lavin was an entrepreneur and manufacturer's representative for various other companies. The newly-created company was then moved to Chicago and a hundred other products were dropped and the company focused on Alberto VO5 shampoo and hairdressing. In 1958, Alberto VO5 Hairdressing became the number one brand in its category. Lavin and his wife Bernice guided the company's growth until 1994 when they turned it over to a second family generation. Until his death in 2017, Lavin remained a director of Alberto-Culver; his daughter Carol Lavin Bernick is the company's executive chair.

In 2005, the Alberto-Culver company bought out Nexxus, a salon hair care company established in 1979. In 2006, the company sought to sell its salon distribution business, which includes Sally Beauty Supply stores and Beauty Systems Group, to Regis Corporation. It later terminated the agreement and on November 10, 2006, shareholders voted to spin off Sally Beauty.

The company's 2007 sales were reported at US$1.54 billion.

In October 2008, Alberto Culver announced it had closed the transaction to acquire the worldwide rights and trademarks to the Noxzema skin care brand from Procter & Gamble, which included the existing business in the United States, Canada and parts of Latin America. Procter & Gamble will continue to operate its existing Noxzema shave care, antiperspirant/deodorant, body wash and body soap business in portions of Western Europe.

The UK head office is in Leatherhead, at Unilever House and earlier, in Chineham, Basingstoke, and the company has a manufacturing plant in Swansea, Wales, where all UK products are produced and also those for some European countries.

=== Acquisition ===
Alberto-Culver was purchased by consumer goods company Unilever on September 27, 2010 for US$3.7 billion. The terms of the acquisition required Unilever to divest selected hair care brands and its entire food business in the USA to other companies to satisfy antitrust concerns (in the late 1990s, Unilever had purchased Alberto-Culver's historic Chicago rival, Helene Curtis). The U.S. food business was bought by B&G Foods, and the U.S. rights to VO5, Rave, and Coast were sold to High Ridge Brands. (Unilever owns these brands in the rest of the world.) With the reduction in American brands, Unilever closed the former Alberto Culver plant in 2013, laying off 600 workers.

== Community ==
Alberto Culver was known for its support of health care, medical research, education and women in the workplace. It did not test its products on animals and stated this on its product packaging.
