= Sun Products =

American cleaning products manufacturer

The Sun Products Corporation
- Company type: Private
- Industry: Cleaning agents
- Founded: 1975; 51 years ago (Huish Detergents Inc.); 2008; 18 years ago (Sun Products)
- Defunct: 2018; 8 years ago
- Fate: Acquired by Henkel North American Consumer Goods in 2016; Sun name retired in 2018
- Headquarters: Wilton, Connecticut, U.S.
- Area served: North America
- Key people: Jeff Ansell (CEO)
- Revenue: US$ 2.0 billion (2008)
- Owner: Henkel North American Consumer Goods
- Number of employees: 3,400 (2008)

The Sun Products Corporation (now Henkel North American Consumer Goods Inc.) was a United States–based manufacturer of laundry detergent, fabric softeners, and other household cleaning products. With annual sales of $2.0 billion, the company's brands included All, Wisk (discontinued), Snuggle, Sun, Surf, and Sunlight. Sun Products holds the second largest market share in the $10 billion North American fabric care market as of 2010. In addition, Sun Products was the manufacturing partner for many retailer brand laundry and dish products in North America.

Sun Products maintains manufacturing facilities in Bowling Green, Kentucky; Pasadena, Texas; Dyersburg, Tennessee; and Salt Lake City, Utah. It has research and development facilities in Trumbull, Connecticut; Salt Lake City, Utah; Bentonville, Arkansas, and Toronto, Ontario, Canada.

== History ==
The predecessor of Sun Products was founded by Dan Huish in 1975 under the name Huish Detergents, Inc. It grew to become the largest manufacturer of retailer/store brands of laundry and dish detergent products in addition to its own Sun brand.

In March 2007, Vestar Capital Partners acquired a majority stake in the company.

In 2007, the company acquired the White Rain hair care brand from Florida-based Diamond Products Company. In 2012, it sold the White Rain brand to High Ridge Brands, which owns other former brands of Alberto-Culver.

In September 2008, Vestar Capital Partners acquired the North American (United States, Canada and Puerto Rico) laundry business of Unilever, which included the Wisk, All, Surf, Sunlight, and Snuggle brands. The former Unilever businesses were combined with Huish Detergents, Inc. to form The Sun Products Corporation.

On June 24, 2016, Henkel North American Consumer Goods Inc., a subsidiary of Henkel AG & Co. KGaA agreed to acquire The Sun Products Corporation for $3.6 billion.

In July 2017, operations of Sun Products was relocated to Stamford, Connecticut in order to consolidate its operations with The Dial Corporation and be closer to parent Henkel's North American headquarters (Henkel Corporation) in Rocky Hill, Connecticut. After consolidation, the business was renamed Henkel North American Consumer Goods (Henkel Corporation) in 2018.
