= Surf (detergent) =

British laundry detergent brand

- Surf logo (Unilever)
- Product type: Laundry detergent, Fabric conditioner (Vietnam, Philippines)
- Current owner: Unilever; Henkel North American Consumer Goods (United States, Canada, Puerto Rico)
- Country: United Kingdom
- Introduced: 1952; 74 years ago
- Related brands: Rinso
- Markets: Worldwide
- Ambassadors: BINI (2025–present; for Fabric Conditioner)

Surf (known as Sunil in the Netherlands) is a British brand of laundry detergent manufactured and marketed around the world by Unilever, except in the United States, Canada and Puerto Rico, where it has been owned by Sun Products (now Henkel North American Consumer Goods) since 2008.

The brand was introduced in 1952 by Crosfields of Warrington, a subsidiary company of Lever Brothers in the United Kingdom. Surf was introduced in the United States in 1959 after Rinso, which had been Lever Brothers Company's lead laundry brand, had declined in sales and market share.

Between 1994 and 2001, Birds of a Feather stars Pauline Quirke and Linda Robson appeared in a series of adverts which saw them in a variety of different scenarios.

In 1998, January Isaac played Lumen in their 'Wais' commercials series in the Philippines; other characters were Lola Obang (Nina Medina) and her son Lando (Nap Miranda) and their twins Ana and Maria (played by Charice and Charlotte Hermoso from 2004 to 2007).

Present in the Brazilian market since 2003, soap powder is currently sold in the following fragrances: Rosas and Flor de Lis; Hydrangeas and White Flowers; Passion Flower and Daisy; and Cherry Blossom and Lavender. It is also available in the form of liquid soap, in the version Jasmine do Oriente and Flor de Lotus. The Tablet version (Bar) was no longer manufactured in July 2010.

In Portugal and the UK, the powder is currently marketed with the "Tropical Lilies & Ylang Ylang" fragrances. In both countries it is also available in pre-dosed "capsules".
