= Henkel =

German consumer goods company

Henkel AG & Co. KGaA

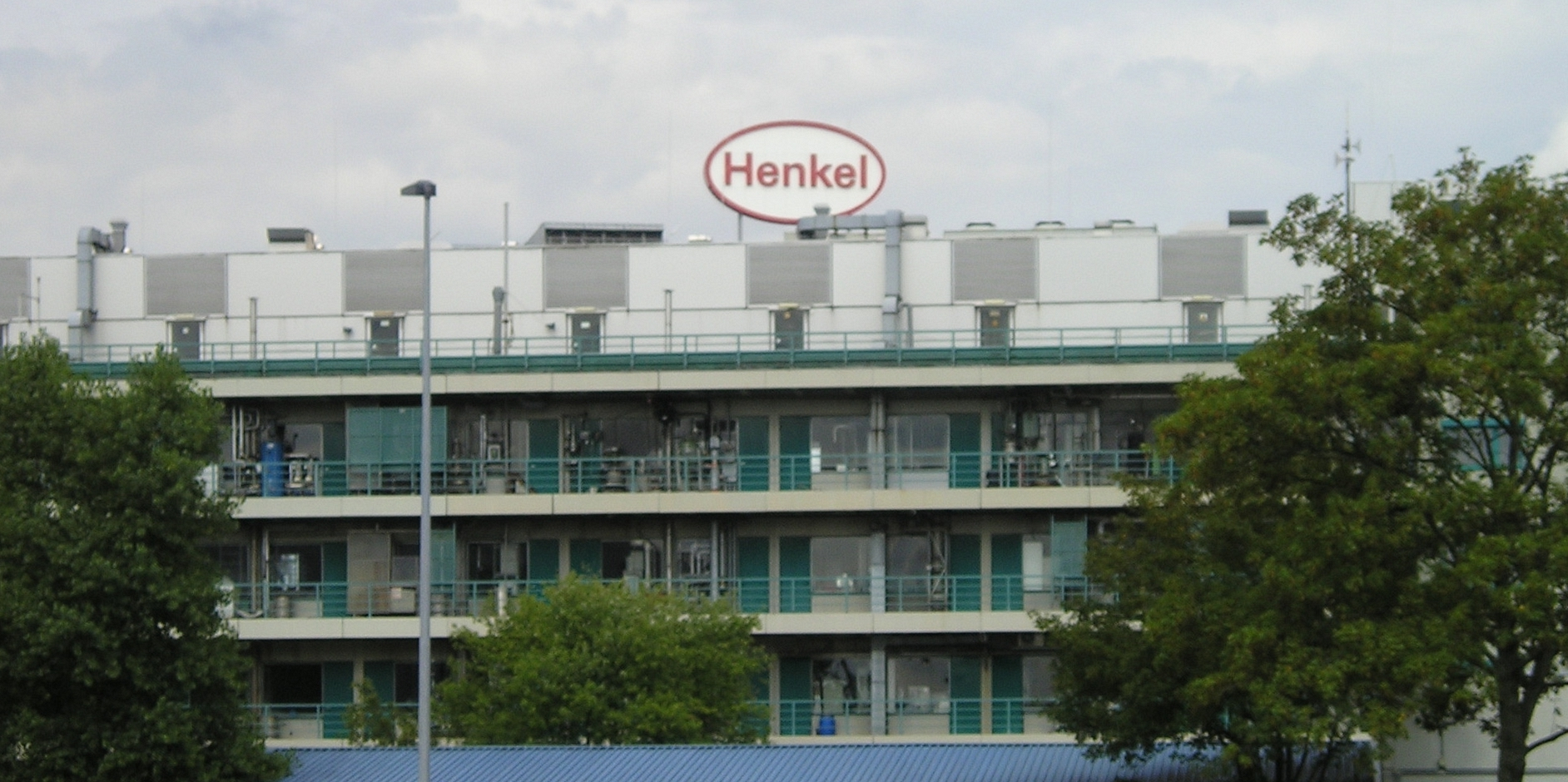
- Henkel's headquarters in Düsseldorf, Germany
- Type: Public
- Traded as: FWB: HEN (Common shares); FWB: HEN3 (Preference shares); DAX compoment (HEN3)
- ISIN: DE0006048432
- Industry: Consumer goods
- Founded: 26 September 1876; 150 years ago
- Founder: Friedrich Karl Henkel
- Headquarters: Düsseldorf, Germany
- Area served: Worldwide
- Key people: Carsten Knobel (CEO and chairman of the executive board), Simone Bagel-Trah (chairwoman of the Shareholders' Committee & Supervisory Board)
- Products: laundry and cleaning products, beauty care, adhesives and sealants
- Revenue: ▼€20.495 billion (2025)
- Operating income: ▼€2.816 billion (2025)
- Net income: ▲€2.058 billion (2025)
- Total assets: ▼€16.439 billion (2025)
- Total equity: ▼€6.597 billion (2025)
- Number of employees: 47,200 (2025)
- Subsidiaries: Henkel North American Consumer Goods
- Website: henkel.com

Henkel AG & Co. KGaA, commonly known as Henkel, is a German multinational chemical and consumer goods company headquartered in Düsseldorf, Germany. Founded in 1876, the DAX company is organized into two globally operating business units (Consumer Brands, Adhesive Technologies) and is known for brands such as Loctite, Persil, Fa, Pritt, Dial and Purex.

In the fiscal year 2025, Henkel reported sales of around 20.5 billion euros and an operating profit of 2.816 billion euros. Henkel holds 47,200 employees with more than 80% working outside of Germany.

== History ==
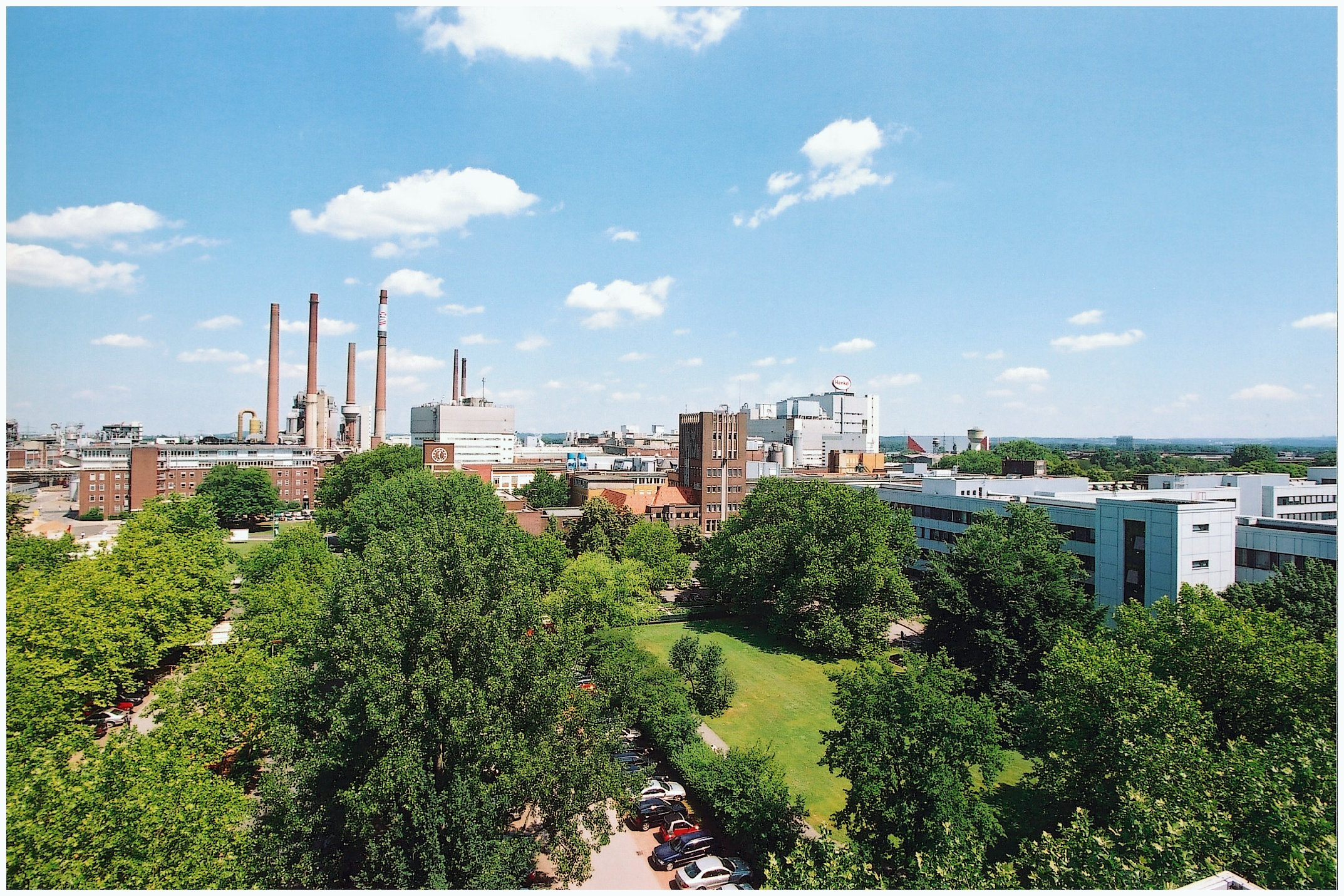
Henkel headquarters Düsseldorf, Germany

The company was founded in 1876 in Aachen as Henkel & Cie by Friedrich Karl Henkel and two other partners who were owners of a factory producing sodium silicate. They marketed his first product, "Universalwaschmittel", a universal detergent based on sodium silicate.

In 1878, Henkel bought out the two partners, and the first German brand-name detergent appeared: Henkel's Bleich-Soda. Made from sodium silicate and soda, it was the result of Fritz Henkel's own research. The soda was obtained from Matthes & Weber in Duisburg, a company that Henkel first bought in 1917 then sold in 1994. That year, to take advantage of the better transport links and sales opportunities, Henkel relocated his company to Düsseldorf on the Rhine. Düsseldorf was the gateway to the Ruhr region, which became the most important industrial area of the German Empire from the 19th century onward.

In 1879, Fritz Henkel was entered as the sole owner in the register of companies. Within a year, sales of Henkel's Bleaching Soda outpaced production at the rented factory on the Schützenstraße in Düsseldorf. Fritz Henkel decided to build his own factory with a direct link to the railway network.

In 1883, to improve liquidity and make better use of the company's travelling sales staff, Fritz Henkel decided to sell merchandise in addition to his detergents. The range included the colorant ultramarine, gloss starch, a liquid cleaning agent, a pomade for cleaning, beef extract, and a hair pomade. In 1886, Henkel opened its first international sales office in Austria. Carl Pathe had gone to Vienna as a representative the year before, and in 1893, Henkel established its first business links with England and Italy.

In 1903, Schwarzkopf, founded by Hans Schwarzkopf (1874, Danzig – 12 February 1921, Berlin), launched a powder shampoo. Persil came in 1907 as the first "self-acting laundry detergent." In 1893, Fritz Henkel Jr. (1875–1930) joined the firm as an apprentice. After receiving commercial training, he became his father's right-hand man in commercial matters. He put Henkel's business on a sound footing, developed its already successful advertising further and was responsible for the company's field service. On 25 July 1904, he became a partner in Henkel, which transformed into a general commercial partnership. By this time, 110 people were employed at the Holthausen site. On 25 April 1905, Dr. Hugo Henkel (1881–1952), the youngest son of Fritz Henkel Sr., joined the company as a chemist. He was in charge of Chemical Products and Technology. Over the years, he laid the foundations of systematic research and introduced advanced technologies and new materials. In 1908, he became a personally liable partner in the company.

In 1912, total production in Düsseldorf-Holthausen rose to 49,890 tons. At 19,750 tons, Persil laundry detergent accounted for 40% of this, five years after its market launch. The number of employees increased by 89 relative to the previous year, resulting in a total workforce of 1,024. A first-aid center was set up in the plant and a full-time nurse was employed. In the previous year, Henkel had installed ball fields and play areas to encourage exercise during break times. Female employees could attend the plant's own housekeeping school during the lunch break.

On 11 January 1923, troops from France and Belgium occupied the Ruhr. The occupation made delivery of adhesives from suppliers used for the packaging of Persil unreliable. The disruption caused Henkel to internally manufacture adhesives for its own needs. Henkel found there was a demand for adhesives on the market, and on 22 June 1923, the first adhesive shipment left the plant.

In 1930, Hugo Henkel took charge of the company. Following the Nazi seizure of power in 1933, he joined the Nazi Party (membership number 2,266,961) and was a member of the Düsseldorf City Council. In the following years, the Henkel company received several awards by the regime and was designated a National Socialist Model Enterprise by the Beauty of Labour organization. After being pressured by the local party chapter, Hugo Henkel stepped down as managing director in 1938. Werner Lüps, the oldest grandson of company founder Fritz Henkel, took his position until his death in 1942. Lüps was a fervent supporter of the National Socialist cause even before 1933 and used the fact that Hermann Göring, Commander-in-Chief of the Luftwaffe, was a distant paternal relative, to be promoted. During his rule, the company increased its shares of Degussa AG significantly, especially after the Kristallnacht in November 1938.

During World War II, several hundred foreign civilian slavery workers and prisoners of war were working for the company.

On 16 April 1945, American troops occupied Henkel's Düsseldorf site. On 5 June, the British military command in Düsseldorf took over from the Americans. From 20 July, the British military government gradually granted permission for the production of adhesives, P3 and water-glass by Henkel, and for soaps and detergents as well as shoe polish by Thompson. In February 1946, Matthes & Weber in Duisburg was given permission to process available raw materials into soda. On 20 September 1945, five members of the Henkel family and another seven members of the Management Board and the Supervisory Board were interned.

In 1949, the launch of Schauma shampoo by Schwarzkopf marked the start of the most successful German shampoos.

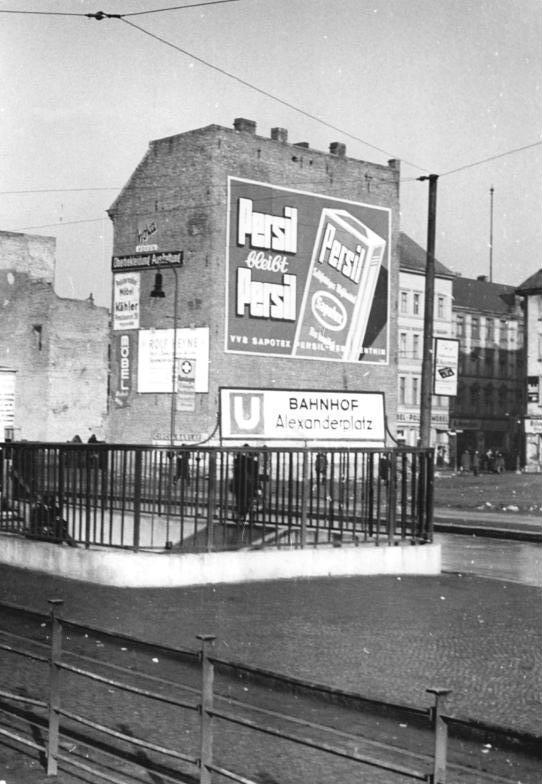
Henkel mural in Berlin, 1951

In 1954, Henkel-subsidiary Dreiring launched Fa soap, a new type of toilet soap. From 1970 onward it was joined by a series of Fa deodorants, shower gels and bubble baths, making Fa one of the best known umbrella brands in the toiletry sector.

Pritt, the world's first glue stick, made its debut in 1969. Over the years, other products were introduced under this brand, underlining Henkel's importance in the office and stationery supplies sector. Exports of Pritt began in the same year, eventually making this Henkel's most widespread global brand. Vernel fabric softener and enzyme-based bioactive Persil 70 appeared.

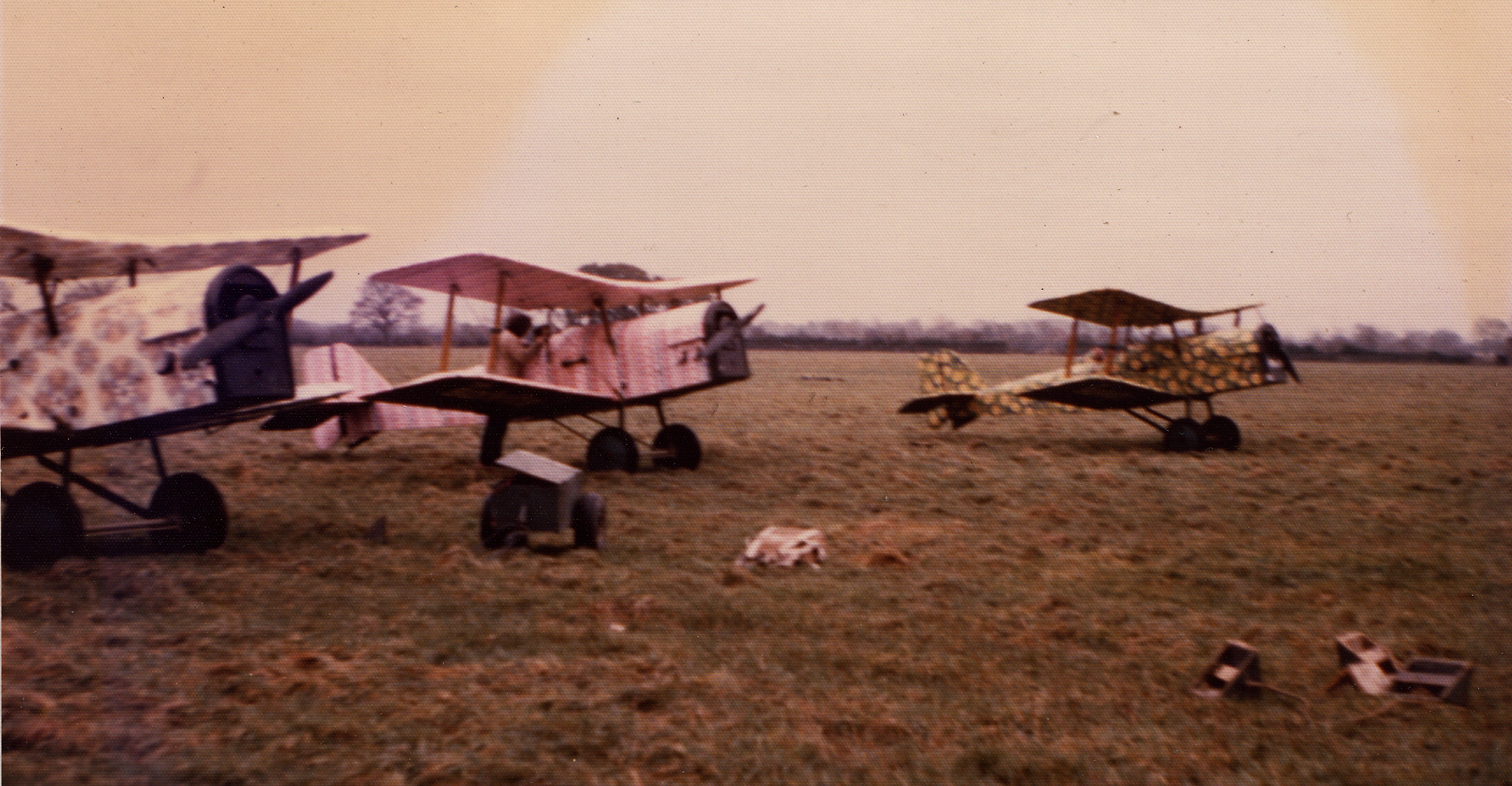
3 Lynn Garrison SE5s for Henkel wallpaper paste ad, Leixlip, Ireland 1973

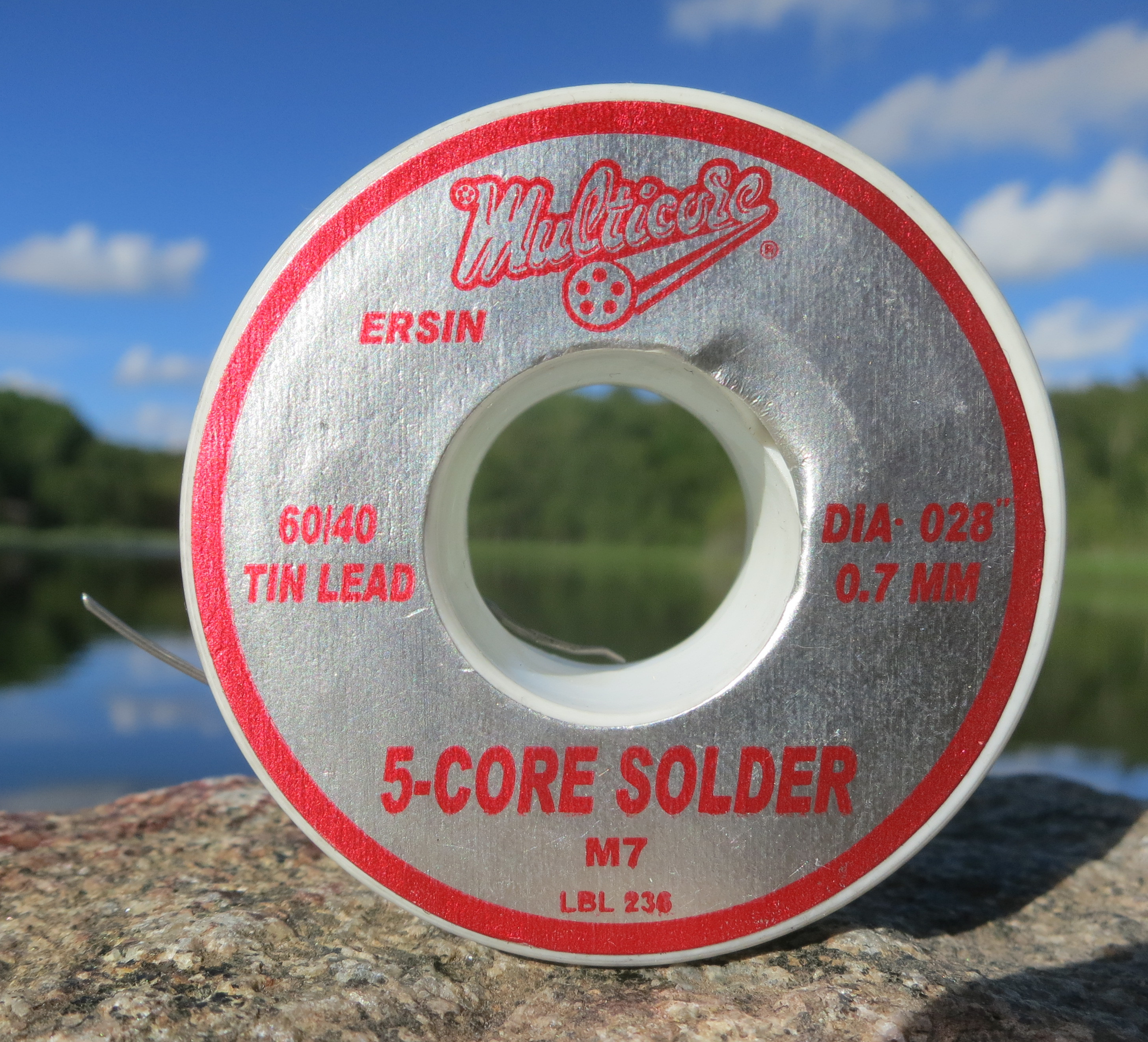
Henkel acquired the Multicore solder brand in 2000.

Starting in the 1960s, Henkel has combined organic growth with strategic company acquisitions:

- In 1960, by acquiring Standard Chemical Products, Inc. (known as Henkel Inc from 1971), Henkel entered the U.S. chemical products market.
- In 1962, Henkel acquired Sichel-Werke AG, Hannover, its main German competitor in the adhesives sector.
- In 1974, Henkel acquired shares in The Clorox Company to facilitate the production and sale of certain products developed by Henkel for household and bulk consumers (sold in 2004).
- In 1983, Henkel acquired the AOK facial care range from the company von Heyden GmbH and thus strengthened its position in the cosmetics retail trade.
- In 1991, Henkel acquired Teroson of Heidelberg (in existence since 1898) and integrated it into its Adhesives and Surface Technologies business sectors.
- In 1995, Henkel acquired the cosmetics company Hans Schwarzkopf GmbH.
- In 1996, Henkel acquired Thiem Automotive, a division of National Starch and Chemical Company. The acquisition included a manufacturing plant in Oak Creek, Wisconsin. In April 2026, Henkel announced that the plant would be shut down in September 2026.
- In 1997, Henkel purchased the Loctite Corporation.
- The purchase of The Dial Corporation in 2004 was Henkel's biggest acquisition in its history at the time. This renowned American personal care and household cleaning products company gave Henkel a strong foothold on the North American market.
- In 2004, Henkel also acquired the American cosmetics company Advanced Research Laboratories (ARL), that has developed and marketed hair cosmetics.
- Also in 2004, Henkel acquired Orbseal. The former Orbseal plant in Richmond, MO was converted to a Henkel plant.
- In April 2008, Henkel acquired National Starch, the adhesives and electronic materials businesses previously owned by AkzoNobel. In 2007, the two business segments of National Starch generated sales of £1.25 billion (about €1.83 billion). The purchase price was £2.7 billion (about €3.7 billion).

In 2008, Henkel KGaA became Henkel AG & Co. KGaA. That same year, Prof. Dr. Ulrich Lehner retired from his position as Chairman of the Management Board of Henkel KGaA. He was succeeded by Kasper Rorsted. In September 2009, Simone Bagel-Trah was elected as new Chairwoman by the Henkel Shareholders' Committee as well as Henkel's Supervisory Board. The retirement of Albrecht Woeste, who had been member of the Committee since 1976 and its president since 1990, marked the transition from the fourth generation of the Henkel family to the fifth.

On 5 May 2011, Jyothy Laboratories bought 50.97% stake in Henkel India. It has offered to buy 20% more in Henkel India through a compulsory open offer mandated by SEBI norms.

In 2014, Henkel offered to buy French-based laundry aids-to-shoe polish manufacturer Spotless for 940 million Euros (about $1.3 billion) in cash. The deal would slightly increase Henkel's share of the $82 billion global laundry care market to 8.7%, still well behind Procter & Gamble's 26.6% and the 14.8% market share held by Unilever, which sells Persil detergent—a Henkel brand—in some markets. The takeover, which was subject to approval from antitrust authorities, was completed in May 2015.

Effective 1 May 2016, Hans Van Bylen took over the position as Chairman of the Henkel Management Board. Also in 2016, Henkel acquired the laundry and home care company Sun Products for 3.2 billion euros ($3.6 billion), thus becoming the No. 2 supplier in the North American laundry care market, and presented its new strategic priorities and financial ambition for 2020.

In 2017, Henkel announces to manage its corporate venture capital activities in a dedicated unit (Henkel Ventures) to invest up to 150 million euros in start-ups with digital or technological expertise. In the same year, Henkel buys Darex Packaging Technologies and Sonderhoff Group, expanding the Adhesive Technologies business. With the acquisition of Nattura Laboratorios in 2017, Henkel also expands its footprint in the US and Latin American professional hair care market. On 7 September, Henkel inaugurates its new North American Consumer Goods headquarters in Stamford, Connecticut. This move is part of the integration of The Sun Products Corporation, which Henkel acquired the year before. In December 2017, Henkel also closes the acquisition of Shiseido's North American hair professional business, including brands like Joico and Zotos.

In October 2019, Carsten Knobel was appointed to succeed Hans Van Bylen as CEO of Henkel as of 1 January 2020. In November 2019, Henkel acquired hair care company DevaCurl from a fund managed by Ares Management Corporation. Also in 2019 Henkel won an Innovation Award from the Adhesives and Sealants Council for "Loctite Universal Structural Bonders Powered by Hybrid Technology," which is a solution for OEM engineers looking for ways to improve assembly applications.

In April 2022, Henkel announced to divest its business activities in Russia due to the escalation of the Russo-Ukrainian War . One year later, it finished the transaction. The company had been active in Russia for more than 30 years, employing up to 2,500 people at eleven production facilities and at eight other locations. Henkel previously generated around one billion Euros in sales in the country.

In March 2026, Henkel announced it had reached a definitive agreement to acquire premium haircare brand Olaplex for $1.4 billion, expanding its presence in science-led prestige haircare.

== Financial data ==
Financial data in € billions
Year	2013	2014	2015	2016	2017	2018	2019	2020	2021	2022	2023	2024	2025
Revenue	16.355	16.428	18.089	18.714	20.029	19.899	20.114	19.250	20.066	22.397	21.514	21.586	20.495
Net Income	1.625	1.662	1.968	2.093	2.541	2.330	2.103	1.424	1.629	1.235	1.340	2.032	2.058
Assets	19.344	20.961	22.323	27.917	28.307	29.623	31.403	30.250	32.669	18.078	17.965	17.534	16.439
Employees	46,850	49,750	49,450	49,950	51,950	53,450	52,650	52,950	52,450	51,950	47,750	47,150	47,200

== Sustainability ==
In 1992, Henkel published its first Environment Report. Henkel is also a founding member of the "World Business Council for Sustainable Development" (WBCSD). In 2003, Henkel declared its participation in the United Nations Global Compact and has committed itself to the Compact's ten principles in the areas of human rights, labor, environment and anti-corruption. Since 2008, Henkel is an official member of the "Roundtable for Sustainable Palm Oil" (RSPO). In 2012 Henkel, along with five other chemical companies, started the Together for Sustainability initiative, focused on the sustainability of its supply chain.

In 2008, the company announced its sustainability targets for 2012, which were met by the end of 2010: energy consumption had decreased by 21 percent, water usage by 26 percent, and the amount of waste generated by 24 percent. Over the same period, the number of occupational accidents fell by 29 percent. Presented in 2012, the goal of Henkel's new Sustainability Strategy 2030 is to achieve more with less and to triple the efficiency. The strategy's focal areas are divided into two dimensions: Under the headline "more value", the company focuses on the areas "social progress", "safety and health" and "performance". The second dimension "reduced footprint" deals with "energy and climate", "materials and waste" and "water and wastewater". As a short-term goal until 2015, Henkel aims to achieve a 15 percent reduction per production unit in the focal areas energy, water and waste. At the same time, the company plans to reach a 10 percent increase in net external sales per production unit. Henkel also intends to reduce its incident rate by 20 percent.

Henkel has been listed in the Dow Jones Sustainability Index. In 2011, the company was named sustainability leader in the Nondurable Household Products sector for the fifth consecutive time.

Henkel has structured its corporate citizenship activities around three core elements: supporting employee volunteering (MIT Initiative), corporate and brand engagement for the common good and emergency aid. Since 1998, Henkel employees and retirees have been involved in over 16,800 projects in more than 100 countries.

In 2016, Standard Ethics Aei has given a rating to Henkel to include the company in its Standard Ethics German Index. In September 2018, Henkel announces new targets for the global packaging strategy to further promote a circular economy.

== Shareholders ==
Around 31% Shares owned by British investors, 30% Shares owned by American investors, followed by Germany (7%), Canada (7%), rest of Europe (19%) and Asia Pacific (5%).

== Competitors and anti-competitive practices ==
Henkel's main competitors in its cleaning division are Unilever, Procter & Gamble and Reckitt Benckiser. In its beauty division, its main competitors are Unilever, Procter & Gamble, Coty, Sephora and L'Oréal. In its chemical and adhesive division, it has many competitors, but the main multinational competitors are Bostik and H.B. Fuller.

Henkel has been found by the European Commission to have established a price-fixing cartel for washing powder in Europe, along with Procter & Gamble and Unilever, which were fined €211.2 million and €104 million respectively, in April 2011. As the provider of the tip-off leading to investigations, Henkel was not fined.

Henkel was fined by Autorité de la concurrence in France in 2016 for price-fixing on personal hygiene products.

== Business units ==
Henkel is organized into three business units: Adhesive Technologies, Beauty Care, and Laundry & Home Care. According to research by Adhesives & Sealants Industry (ASI), Henkel leads the global market in the field of adhesives. Henkel's Beauty Care and Laundry & Home Care consumer businesses also hold top positions in numerous markets and categories.

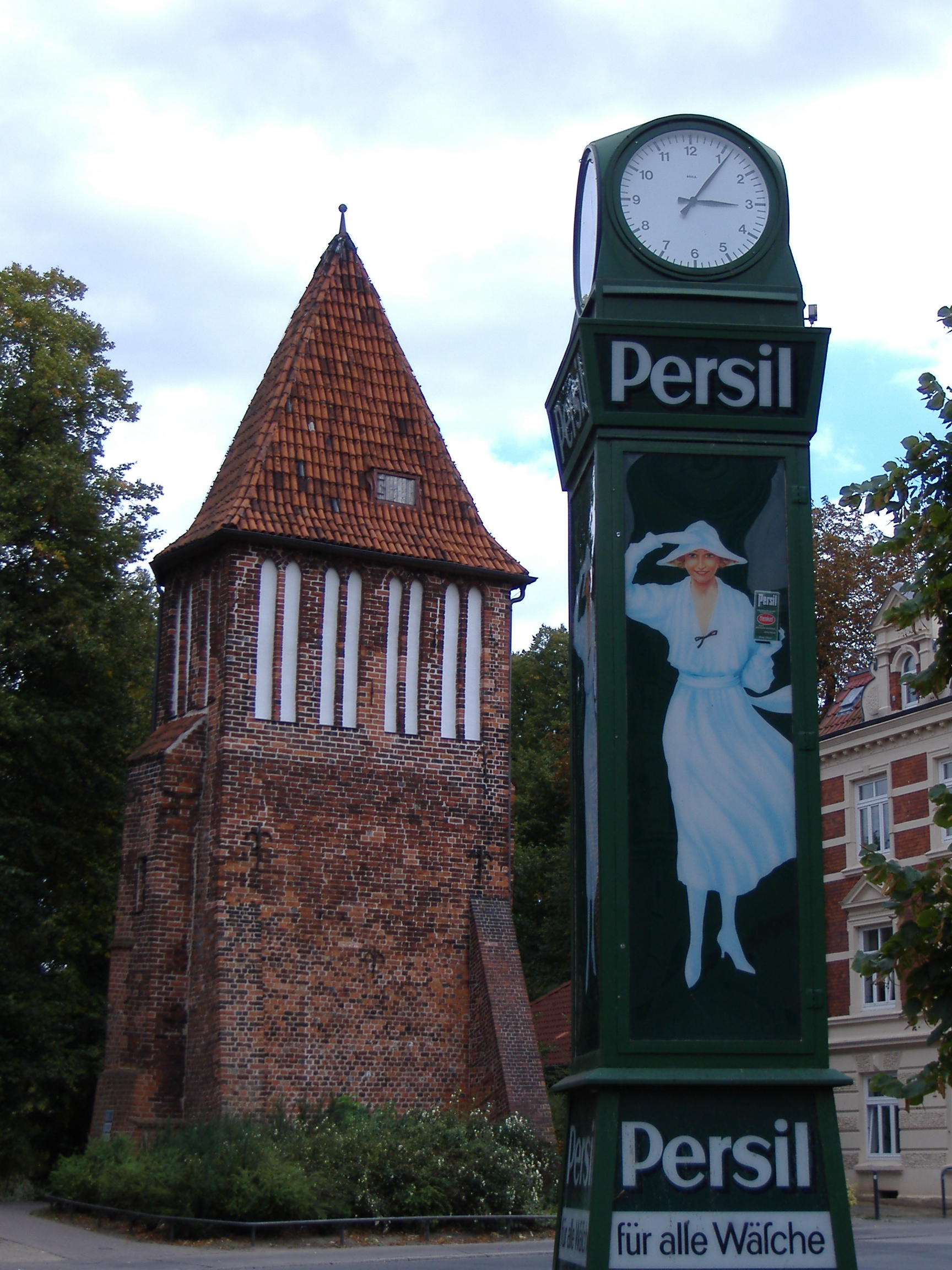
Vintage Persil advertising in Wismar

=== Adhesive technologies ===
As of 2025, Henkel is the world's number one adhesives producer. The business unit offers a broad portfolio of adhesives, sealants, and functional coatings for both industry and consumers with brands including Loctite, Technomelt, Teroson, Bonderite, and Aquence, and consumers, craftsmen and building businesses with brands Pritt, Loctite, Ceresit and Pattex. The consumers, craftsmen, and building business area markets a range of brand-name products for private, trade and construction users, whereas the industry business includes four areas:

- Packaging and consumer goods adhesives
- Transport and metal
- General industry
- Electronics

In June 2018, Henkel opened a new 3D printing technology hub in Tallaght, Ireland. In 2018, Henkel also laid the cornerstone for a new global innovation center of its Adhesive Technologies business at the company's headquarters in Düsseldorf, investing more than €130 million. The center is planned to open end of 2020.

=== Consumer brands ===
Henkel Consumer Brands covers products in the areas of laundry, home care and hair.

Henkel's hair and body care brands include Schwarzkopf, Dial, and Syoss. In 2017, Henkel successfully launched #mydentity hair color together with Guy Tang, a leading hairdresser and social media influencer. In 2018, Henkel presented the Schwarzkopf SalonLab at CES – a digital hair salon experience using technology to customize products. The company continues to expand its portfolio of professional hair care products, currently owning brands Alterna, Authentic Beauty Concept, Joico, Kenra, Pravana, and Sexy Hair.

Henkel's most famous brand is Persil, introduced in 1907, the first commercial "self-activated" laundry detergent, which means a bubble-forming bleach (sodium perborate) with a soap component (silicate). The abbreviation of the names of the two main components perborate and silicate compose the product name. Persil is the biggest brand for Henkel's Laundry & Home Care category, generating sales of more than 1 billion euros in 2017. Today, Henkel's Laundry & Home Care category ranges from heavy-duty detergents, speciality detergents and laundry additives to dishwashing products, hard surface and WC cleaners, air fresheners and insect control products.

Other brands include Purex washing powder and liquid laundry detergent, Sun liquid laundry detergent, Vernel/Silan fabric softener, Somat/Glist dishwasher tablets, and Pril washing-up liquid. In the United States and Canada only (the brands elsewhere are owned by Unilever) All, Wisk, Snuggle, and Sunlight detergent and fabric softener brands are also Henkel brands. The brands owned by Unilever elsewhere, plus Sun, were acquired by Henkel through its acquisition of Sun Products in 2016.

Persil Abaya Shampoo or Persil Black is a liquid detergent that Henkel introduced to the Saudi Arabian market in 2007 and later to other Gulf Cooperation Council region markets. The company sells the liquid as a specialist detergent for abayas, the loose, traditionally black, robe-like garments worn by women in many Islamic cultures.

== See also ==
- Cognis
- Henkel North American Consumer Goods
