= Shower gel =

Liquid products used for cleaning the body

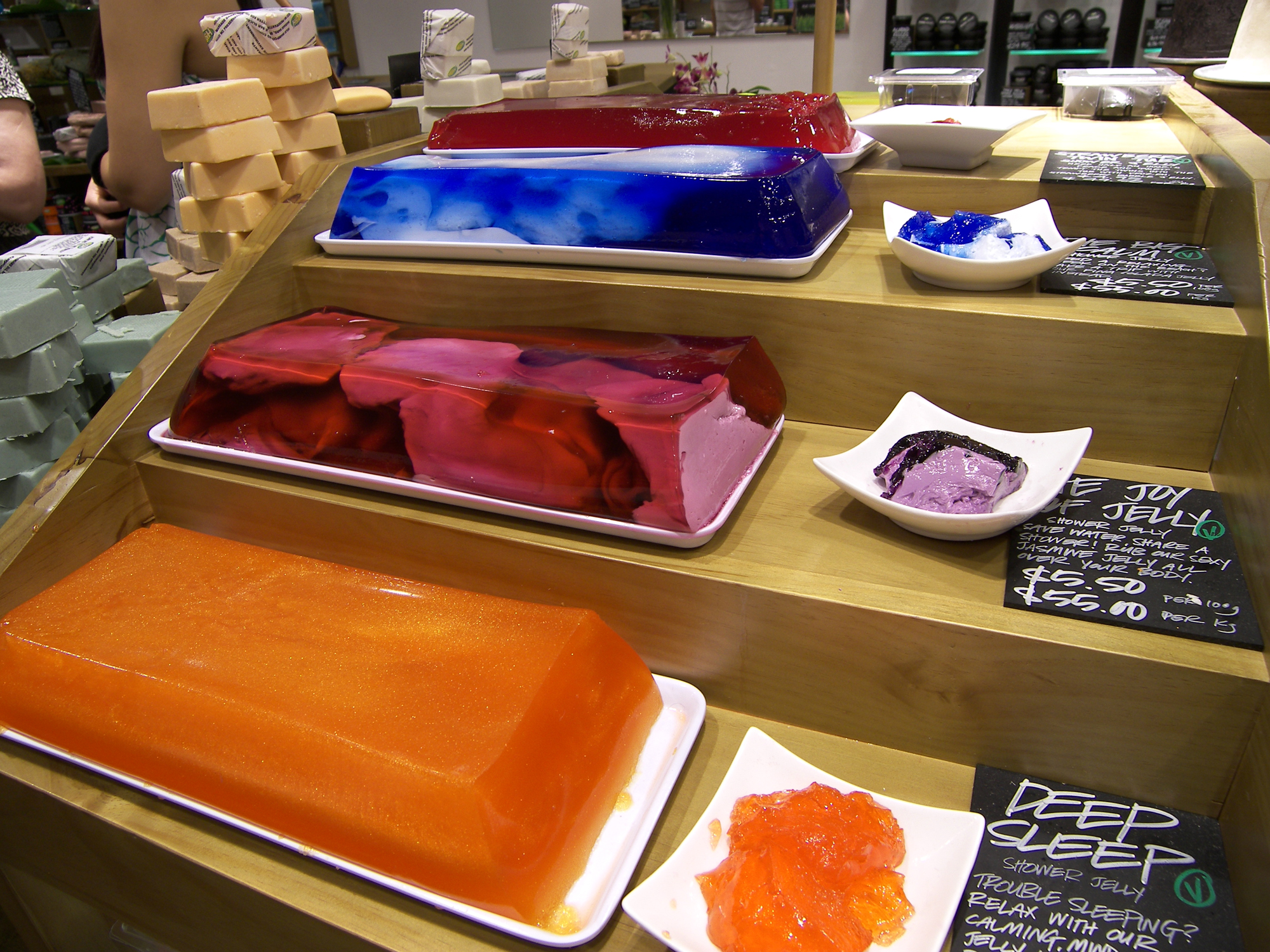
Shower jellies

Shower gel (also called body wash) is a specialized liquid product used for cleaning the body during showers. Not to be confused with liquid soap, shower gels do not contain saponified oil. Instead, they use synthetic detergents derived from either petroleum or plant sources.

Body washes and shower gels have a lower pH value than the traditional soap, and tends to be less drying to the skin. In certain cases, sodium stearate is added to the chemical combination to create a solid version of the gel.

== History ==
Shower gel is a derivative invention of liquid soap and first appeared in the 19th century. In 1865, William Shepphard patented the first formula for liquid soap, but the product gained popularity with the rise of Palmolive soap in 1898, by B.J. Johnson.

Over time, the formula was adjusted to be less harsh and more skin-suitable. That led to tailored body products such as shower gel. The switch from traditional bar soaps to liquid soaps picked up in the 1950's due to modernized fragrance and packaging options, as well as convenience.

== Safety, ingredients, and the environment ==
Shower gels are known to contain water, a surfactant (typically sodium laureth sulfate), moisturizers, and fragrance. Some ingredients are known to cause irritation, allergic reactions, and/or harm to the environment. A 2024 article details the toxicological risks linked with the chemicals in the beauty and personal care products. That resulted in the cosmetics industry transitioning to cleaner formulations and sustainable packaging. A 2022 study on sustainability in cosmetics also spotlighted the shift to becoming eco-friendly, with some manufacturers offering refill stations and sustainable packaging.

== Properties ==
The main difference between the two soap products lie in their surfactants - compounds known to lower the surface tension between substances, which help with the emulsification and the washing away of oily dirt. The surfactants of shower gels do not come from saponification, that is by reacting a type of oil or fat with lye. Instead, it uses synthetic detergents for surfactants derived from either plant-based sources or petroleum. That gives the product a lower pH value than soap and might also feel less drying to the skin. Some people have likened the effect to feeling less squeaky clean, however.

Surfactants can make up as much as 50 percent of the shower gel content, with the remaining proportion being made up of a combination of water and ingredients to thicken, preserve, emulsify, add fragrance, and color. Multiple surfactants are often used to achieve desired product qualities. A primary surfactant can provide good foaming ability and cleaning effectiveness, while a secondary surfactant can add qualities of mildness to prevent irritation or over-drying of the skin. To prevent shower gel ingredients from separating, emulsifiers such as diethanolamine are added. Conditioning agents may also be added to moisturize the skin during and after product use. They are also available in different colours and scents. Ingredients, such as scent in the form of essential oils or fragrance oils, and colorant in the form of water-soluble dyes, are common in shower gels.

Until recently, microbeads were commonly used in shower gels. Microbeads are tiny spheres of plastic that were added to a variety of cosmetic products for their exfoliating properties. They are too small to filter out of water systems and end up in waterways and oceans, potentially passing toxins to humans and other animal life. Following the legislative actions of other countries, the United States passed the Microbead-Free Waters Act in 2015, which banned microbeads being used in the U.S. incrementally, starting in 2017, with full implementation set for 2019. The production and use of microbeads has been banned in cosmetics in the U.S. since July 1, 2017, and in the UK since October 1, 2018.

Shower gels for men may contain the ingredient menthol, which gives a cooling and stimulating sensation on the skin, and some men's shower gels are also designed specifically for use on the hair and body. Shower gels contain milder surfactant bases than shampoos, and some also contain gentle conditioning agents in the formula.

== Culture and usage ==
In the United States, body wash surpassed bar soap in retail sales value around 2010, although bar soap remains widely sold. In 2021, body wash outsold bar soap by 2.4x in the US, though body wash is more expensive per package. Bar soap is still popular due to its affordability and accessibility, as well as tradition. Neilsen IQ reported in 2025 that bar soap sales grew 33%.

== Marketing ==
As with shampoo and bubble bath products, many gels are marketed directly to children. They often feature scents intended to appeal to children, such as fruit, cookie or cotton candy scents. Many bottles feature popular characters from children's television or movies.

Shower gels are also often marketed based on gender preferences. Women targeted products tend to highlight moisturizing ingredients, fruity or floral scents, and light or bright colored packaging, while those designed for men tend to use darker packaging and fresh or "sporty" scents.

== Future direction ==
Due to rising concern about chemicals, and the demand for "clean" beauty products, manufacturers are reformulating and relabeling products. Competitors are advertising soap bars as "all natural"", and people in less-developed areas are reverting to bar soaps due to the lower price tags. Market research in 2025 noted that body wash and shower gel products containing natural and organic components had become increasingly popular, with concerns regarding synthetic chemicals and their possible effects on the environment and human health being a driving force behind that trend.
