= List of cleaning products =

This is a list of cleaning products and agents. Cleaning agents are substances (usually liquids, powders, sprays, or granules) used to remove dirt, including dust, stains, bad smells, and clutter on surfaces. Purposes of cleaning agents include health, beauty, removing offensive odor, and avoiding the spread of dirt and contaminants to oneself and others.

== Cleaning products ==
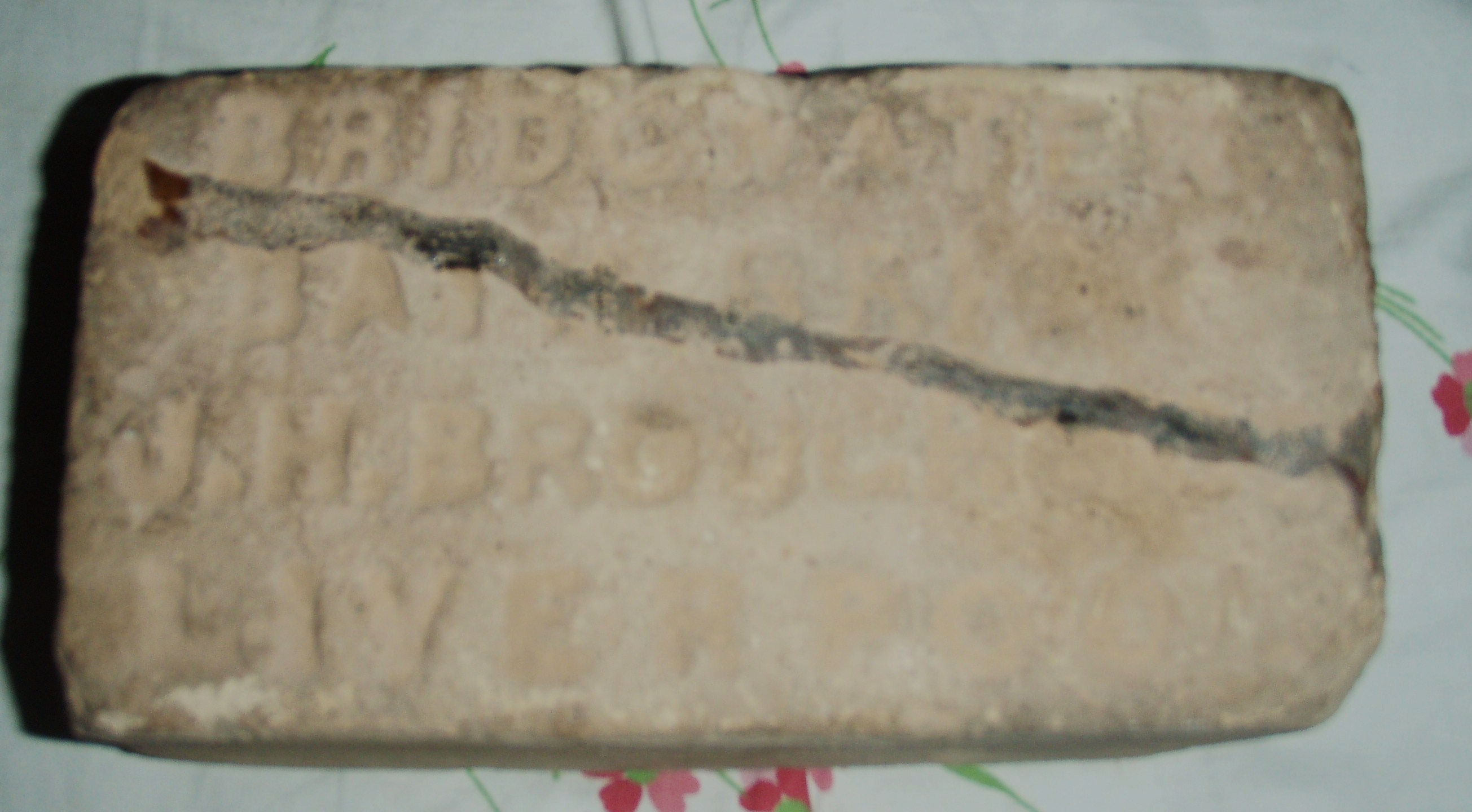
A bath brick

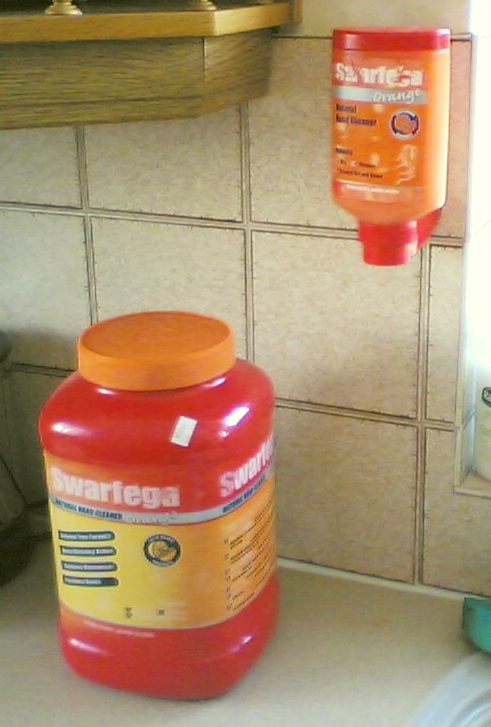
A bottle of Swarfega and a dispenser

- Air freshener
- Automatic deodorizer dispenser
- Ajax (cleaning product)
- Arm & Hammer (brand)
- Bar Keepers Friend
- Bath brick – patented in 1823, it was a predecessor of the scouring pad used for cleaning and polishing
- Behold
- Biological detergent
- Blanco (compound)
- Bluing (fabric)
- Bon Ami
- Borax
- Brillo Pad
- Bronze wool
- 2-Butoxyethanol
- Calcium Lime Rust
- Cif
- Cleret Glass Cleaner
- Colour Catcher
- Comet (cleanser)
- Denture cleaner
- Descaling agent
- Detergent
- Didi Seven
- Dishwashing liquid
- Dispensing ball
- Disposable towel
- Dolly blue
- Domestos
- Donkey stone
- Drano
- Dryer ball
- Dust-Off
- Ecover
- Endust
- Fabric softener
- Fairy (brand)
- Falcon Safety Products
- Bon Ami Company
- Febreze
- Finish (detergent)
- Formula 409
- Frosch USA
- Gas duster
- Glade (brand)
- Guar hydroxypropyltrimonium chloride
- Hard-surface cleaner – a category of cleaning agents comprising mainly aqueous solutions of specialty chemicals
- Hillyard, Inc.
- Laundry ball
- Lestoil – a heavy-duty multi-purpose cleanser product
- Liquid-Plumr
- Monkey Brand – a soap introduced in the 1880s as a household scouring and polishing soap, in cake/bar form
- Mr Sheen
- Mrs. Stewart's Bluing – a brand of fabric bluing agent first marketed in 1883 that whitens fabrics with a proprietary blue dye, primarily made of blue iron powder
- Murphy Oil Soap
- OxiClean
- Paper towel
- Phisoderm
- Piranha solution
- ReNu
- Retr0bright
- Rozalex
- Rubbing alcohol
- Seventh Generation Inc.
- Saddle soap
- Scotch-Brite
- Scouring pad
- Shake n' Vac
- Shoe polish
  - Esquire Shoe Polish
  - Kiwi (shoe polish)
  - Shinola
  - Wren's Super Wax Shoe Polish
- Simple Green
- Snuggle
- S.O.S Soap Pad
- Soap
- Soap on a rope
- Soap substitute
- Sodium bisulfate
- Sodium hydroxide
- Sodium polycarboxylate
- Spic and Span
- Spiffits
- Sponge (material)
- Steel wool
- Surf (detergent)
- Swarfega – a brand of heavy-duty hand cleaner
- Tawashi
- Toilet cleaner
  - Sani Flush
  - Toilet Duck
  - Toilet rim block
  - Urinal deodorizer block
- V-Bor
- Vegetable wash
- Vim (cleaning product)
- Yucca glauca

=== Brands ===
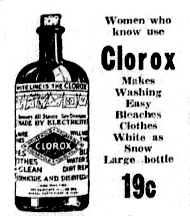
A 1922 newspaper advertisement for Clorox bleach

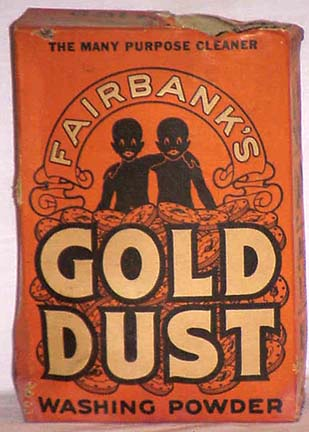
A box of Gold Dust washing powder, 1904

- 20 Mule Team Borax
- 2000 Flushes
- Ariel (detergent)
- Bosisto's
- Bounty (brand)
- Brasso
- Calgon
- Cascade (brand)
- Cheer (brand)
- Chore Boy
- Cillit Bang
- Clorox
  - Armor All
  - Formula 409
  - Lestoil
  - Liquid-Plumr
  - Pine-Sol
  - S.O.S Soap Pad
- Comfort (fabric softener)
- Dawn (brand)
- Dettol (brand)
- Downy
- Fels-Naptha
- Frosch USA
- Glass Plus
- Gold Dust washing powder
- Harpic
- Joy (dishwashing liquid)
- Lysol
- Leifheit
- Mr Muscle
- Mr Sheen
- Mr. Clean
- Palmolive (brand)
- Pledge (brand)
- Purell
- Purex (laundry detergent)
- Rinso
- Scrub Daddy
- Scrubbing Bubbles
- Suavitel
- Supamop
- Swiffer
- Tide (brand)
- Ty-D-Bol
- Vanish (brand)
- Vileda
- Windex
- Woolite

=== Disinfectants ===
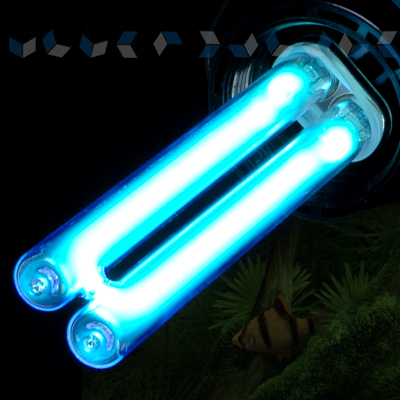
A UV-emitting gas discharge lamp for the sterilization of water, an example of a germicidal lamp

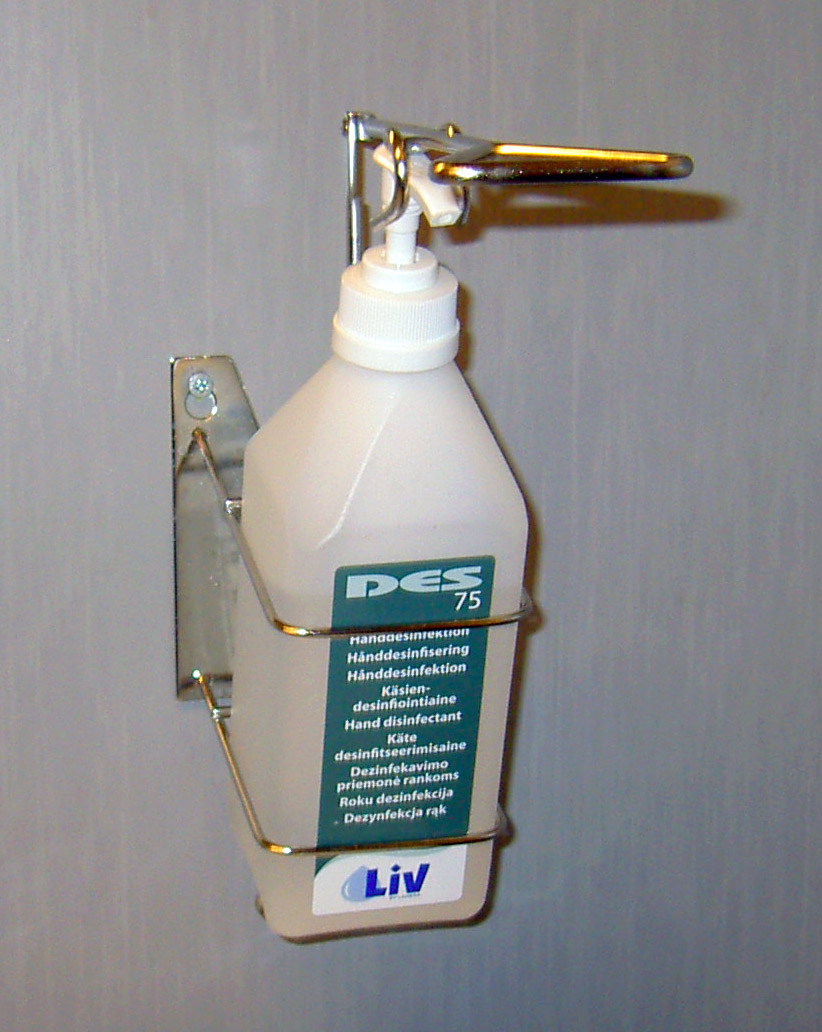
Alcohol-based hand sanitizer in a hospital

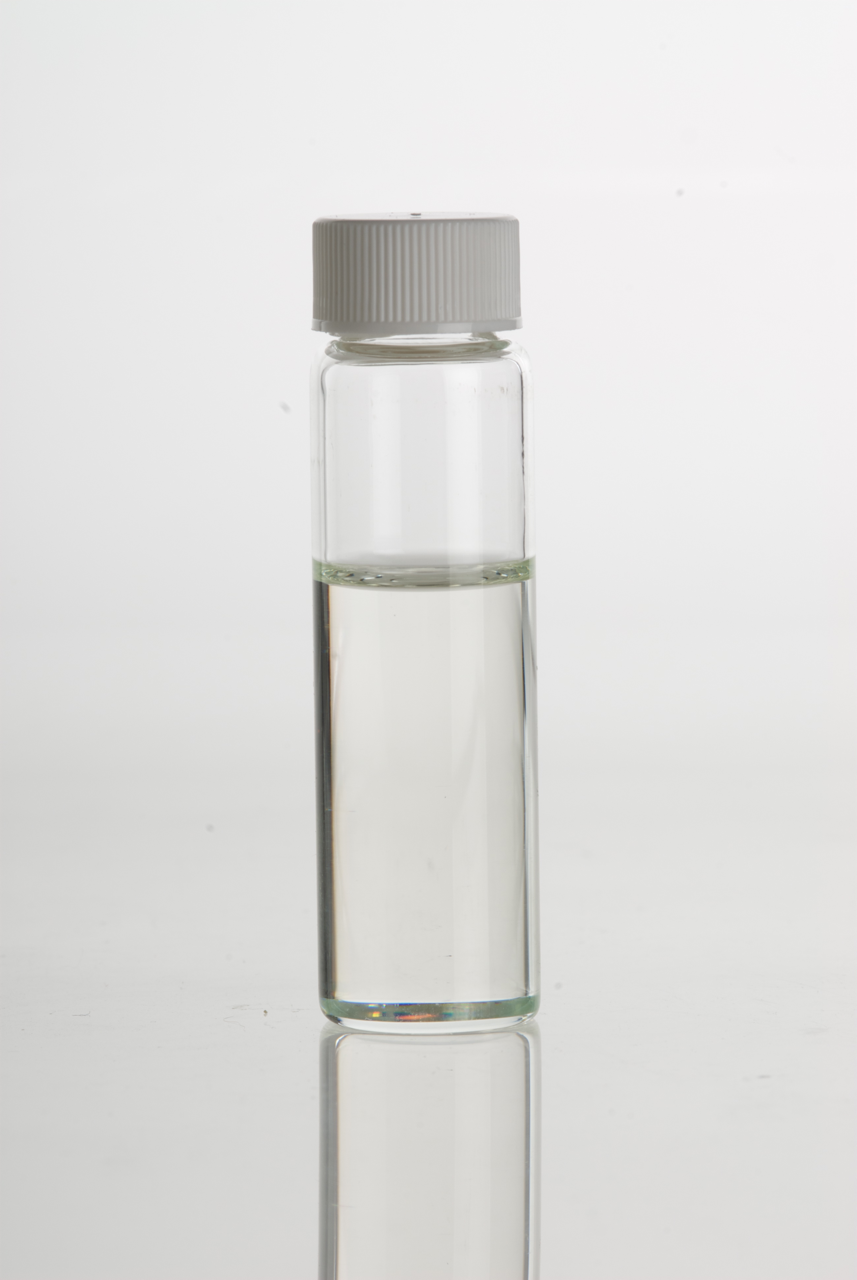
Pine oil

Disinfectants are antimicrobial agents that are applied to the surface of non-living objects to destroy microorganisms that are living on the objects.

- Air sanitizer
- Antimicrobial copper-alloy touch surfaces
- Barbicide
- Barium borate
- BCDMH
- Behentrimonium chloride
- Benzethonium chloride
- Benzododecinium bromide
- Bleach
- Bromine monochloride
- Calcium oxide
- Calcium peroxide
- Carbethopendecinium bromide
- Carbol fuchsin
- Carbolic soap
- Chlorhexidine
- Chlorine dioxide
- 2-Chlorophenol
- Creolin
- Cresolene
- Crystal violet
- DBDMH
- Diazolidinyl urea
- Electrolysed water
- Ethanol
- Eucalyptus oil
- Fuchsine
- Germicidal lamp
- Gluma
- Glutaraldehyde
- Hand sanitizer
- Hexachlorocyclohexa-2,5-dien-1-one
- Hydrogen peroxide
- Hypochlorous acid
- Hypomide
- Imidazolidinyl urea
- Iodophor
- Isopropyl alcohol
- Jeyes Fluid – a brand of disinfectant fluid
- Lapyrium
- Lithium hypochlorite
- Lugol's iodine
- Magnesium monoperoxyphthalate
- Methyl violet
- Milton sterilizing fluid
- Nitromersol
- Ozone
- Peracetic acid
- Phenols
- Pine oil
- Polyaminopropyl biguanide
- Potassium hypochlorite
- Potassium permanganate
- Povidone-iodine
- Pseudomonas aeruginosa
- Quaternary ammonium cation
- Sodium dichloroisocyanurate
- Sodium hypochlorite
- Sodium metabisulfite
- Sodium permanganate
- Thymol
- Tincture of iodine
- 2,4,6-Trichlorophenol
- Vaporized hydrogen peroxide
- Virkon – a multi-purpose disinfectant product
- Wet wipe

=== Laundry detergents ===
Laundry detergent, or washing powder, is a type of detergent (cleaning agent) that is added for cleaning laundry.

- Annette's Perfect Cleanser Company – was a 1930s era firm which manufactured a dry powder which was useful for removing spots and stains from clothing
- Ariel (detergent)
- Biz (detergent)
- Bold (detergent)
- Breeze detergent
- Cheer (brand)
- Cold Power
- Colour Catcher
- Dash (detergent)
- Daz (laundry detergent)
- Didi Seven
- Dreft
- Fresh Start (detergent)
- Gain (detergent)
- Ghari Detergent
- Laundry detergent pod
- Luvil
- Nirma
- Oxydol
- Persil
- Persil Power
- Purex (laundry detergent)
- Rinso
- Sunlight (cleaning product)
- Surf (detergent)
- Surf Excel
- Tide (brand)
- Tolypers
- Wheel (detergent)
- WIN (detergent)
- Wisk – discontinued in 2016
- Woolite

=== Soaps ===
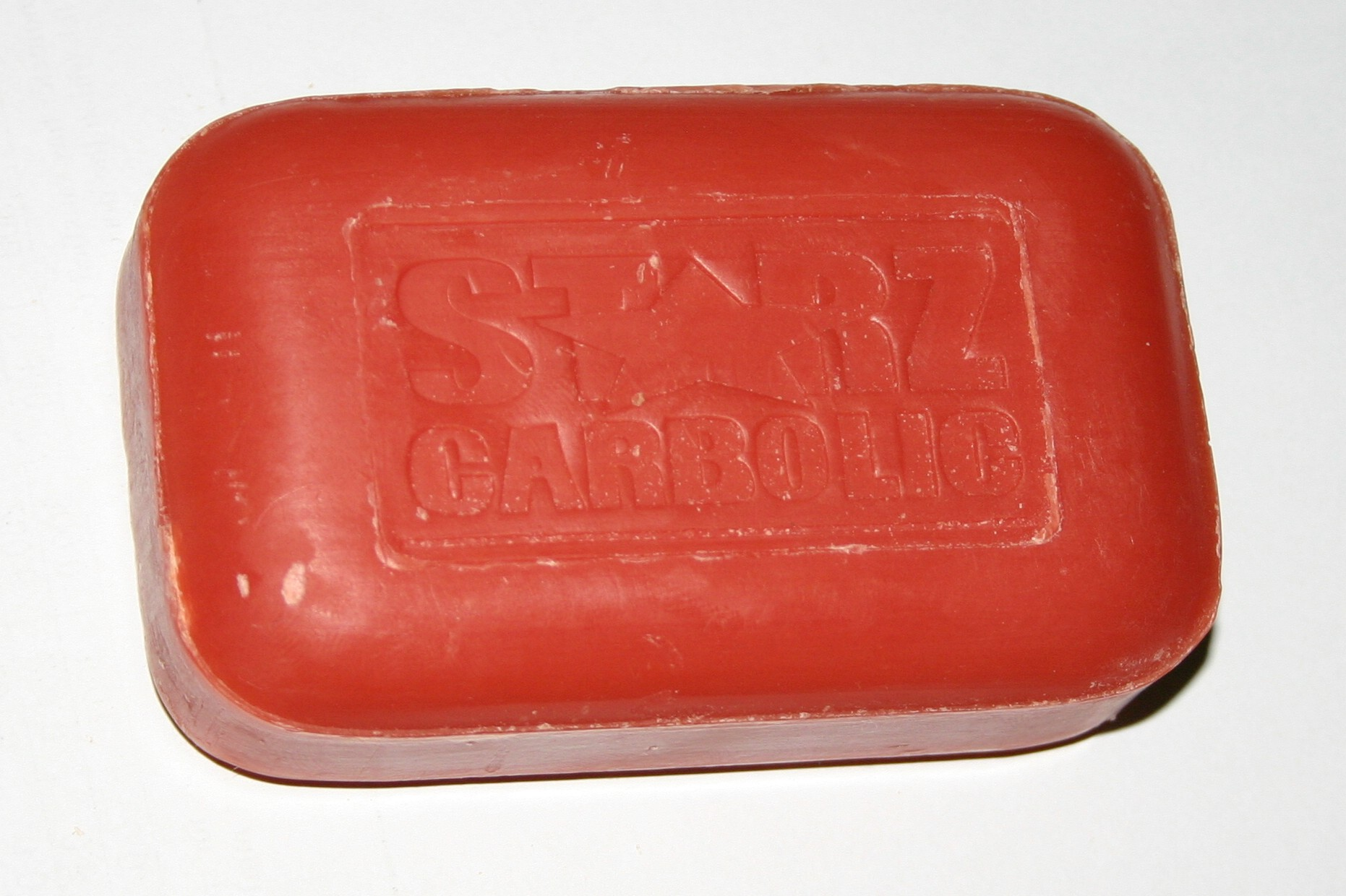
A bar of carbolic soap

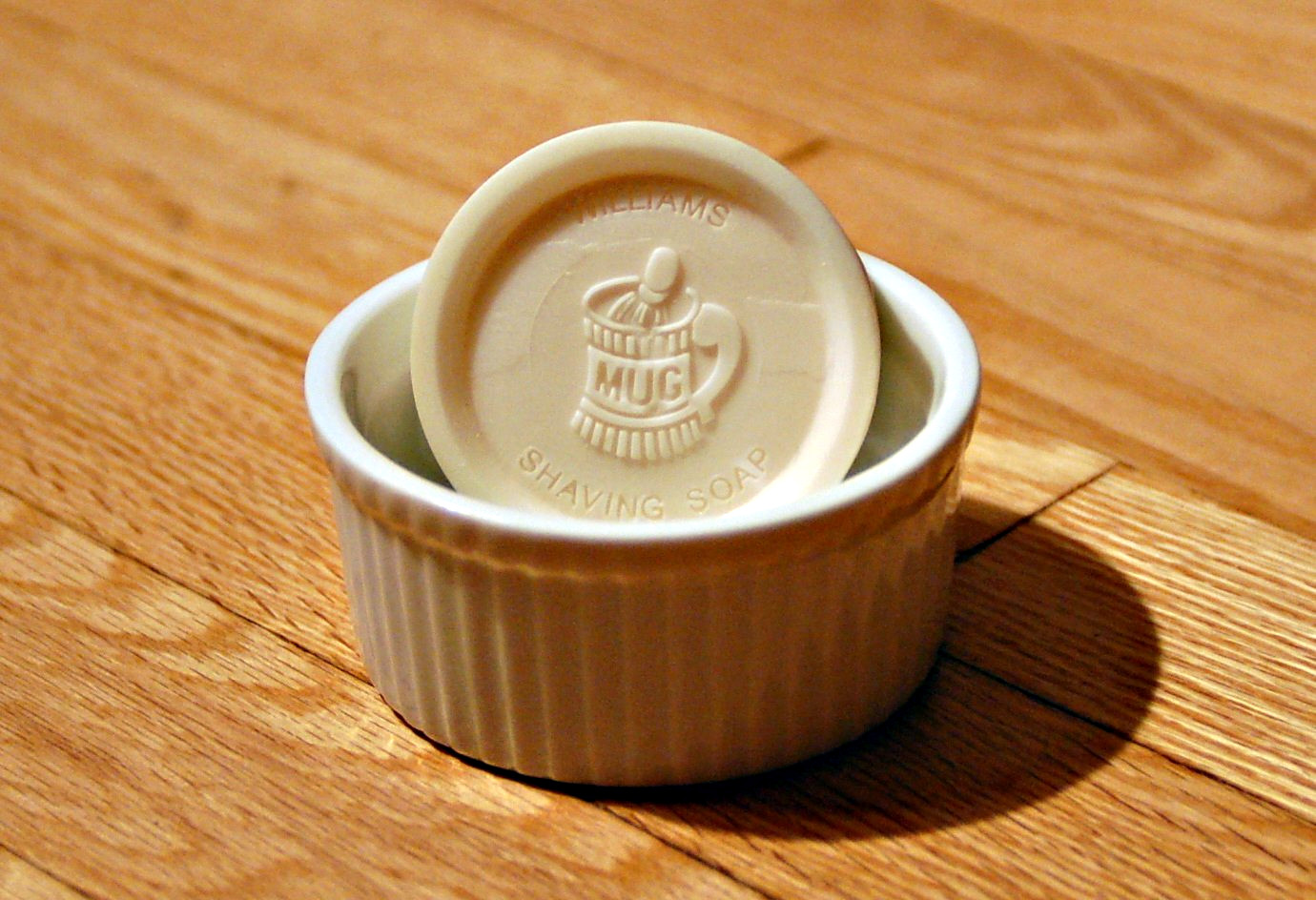
A puck of shaving soap in a ceramic bowl

In chemistry, a soap is a salt of a fatty acid. Household uses for soaps include washing, bathing, and other types of housekeeping, where soaps act as surfactants, emulsifying oils to enable them to be carried away by water.

- African black soap
- Aleppo soap
- Antibacterial soap
- Azul e branco soap
- Carbolic soap
- Castile soap
- Cuticura soap
- Glycerin soap
- Gossage
- Hard soap
- Lye
- Marseille soap
- Nabulsi soap
- Phisoderm
- Popish soap
- Rebatching
- Resin soap
- Saltwater soap
- Shaving soap
- Sodium stearate
- Stainless steel soap
- Sugar soap
- Vegan soap

==== Soap brands ====
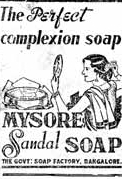
A 1937 advertisement for Mysore Sandal Soap

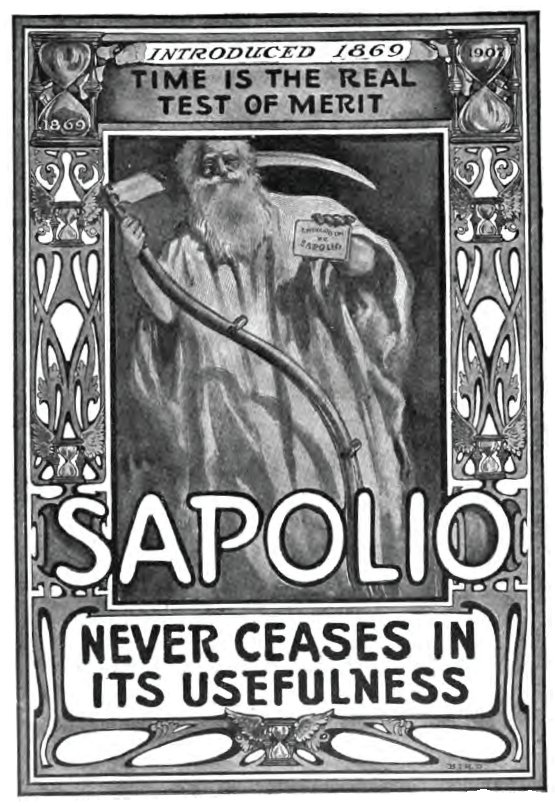
A 1907 advertisement for Sapolio soap

- Ach. Brito
- Biechele Soap
- Boraxo
- Camay
- Caswell-Massey
- Chandrika (soap)
- Coast (soap)
- Defense Soap
- Dial (soap)
- Dove (toiletries)
- Dr. Bronner's Magic Soaps
- Faso soap
- Fels-Naptha
- Fenjal
- Godrej Consumer Products Limited
- Hamam (soap)
- Imperial Leather
- Irish Spring
- Ivory (soap)
- Joy (dishwashing liquid)
- Kerala Soaps
- L'Amande
- Lano (soap)
- Lava (soap)
- Lever 2000
- Lifebuoy (soap)
- Liril
- Lux (soap)
- Margo (soap)
- Medimix
- Mysore Sandal Soap
- Nivea
- Old Spice
- Palmolive (brand)
- Pears (soap)
- Proraso
- Rozalex
- Sapolio
- Sebamed
- Shower Shock
- Simple Skincare
- Sunlight (cleaning product)
- Swan Soap
- Swarfega
- Wright's Coal Tar Soap
- Zest (brand)

== See also ==
- Automatic soap dispenser
- William E. Corbin – inventor of Nibroc paper towels
- Environmental impact of cleaning agents
- Green cleaning
- International Nomenclature of Cosmetic Ingredients
- List of cleaning companies
- Saponification
- Soap dispenser
- Surfactant
- Terminal cleaning
- UK Cleaning Products Industry Association
