= DD7 =

DD7 can refer to:

- DD7, a postcode district in the DD postcode area
- Didi Seven
- a Lotus 7 inspired kit car
