= Hexosan =

Hexosan may refer to:

- Any of a group of polysaccharide hemicelluloses that hydrolyze to hexose
- Hexachlorophene, an organochlorine compound that has been used as a disinfectant (trade name Hexosan)
