= Virac =

Virac may refer to:

- Virac, Catanduanes, a municipality in the province of Catanduanes, Philippines
  - Virac Airport, airport in Virac, Catanduanes
- Virac, Itogon, a barangay of the municipality of Itogon in the province of Benguet, Philippines
- Virac, Tarn, a municipality in the Tarn department, France
- Ventspils Starptautiskais Radioastronomijas Centrs (Ventspils International Radio Astronomy Centre), an ex-Soviet radio astronomy installation 30 km north of Ventspils, Latvia
- Virac, a trade name for the drug undecoylium chloride iodine
