= Swarfega =

Heavy-duty hand cleaning product

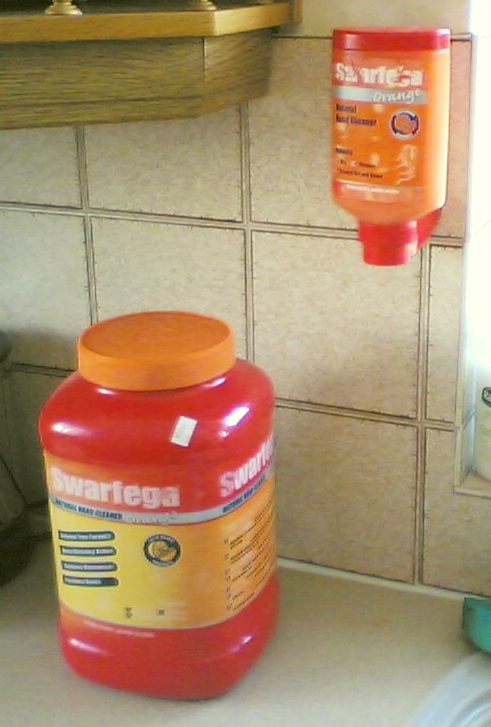
Swarfega - heavy duty hand cleaner

Swarfega (/swɔːrˈfiːɡə/) is a brand of heavy-duty hand cleaner made by Deb Limited, a British company based in Denby, Derbyshire. It is used in engineering, construction, and other manual trades, such as printing.

It is a gelatinous, thixotropic substance, dark green or orange in colour, which is used to clean grease, oil, printer's ink, or general persistent, hydrophobic dirt from the skin. A small amount of Swarfega is worked into dry skin and then wiped or rinsed off. As with other such cleaners, it can be more effective than soap or other common cleansing products at removing such dirt; accordingly, in the UK, Swarfega became virtually ubiquitous in environments where this kind of dirt is common, such as garages and machine shops.

== History ==
Swarfega was invented in 1947 by Audley Bowdler Williamson (28 February 1916 - 21 November 2004), an industrial chemist from Heanor, Derbyshire. In 1941, he founded a detergent-sales company, Deb Silkware Protection Ltd., based in Belper, to produce a formulation for extending the life of silk stockings. The name derived from "debutante", to signify the newness of the company and its products. The introduction of nylon stockings threatened to render it superfluous; however, Williamson purportedly suggested that mechanics had already found it useful for cleaning their hands. This myth may have been encouraged to attract interest, but the product was reformulated and marketed as Swarfega, becoming the company's main product. (The company's name had been changed to Deb Chemical Proprietaries Ltd.) Before Swarfega, mechanics used a variety of harsh home-brewed cleaners such as paraffin (kerosene), sand, and petrol. These removed the skin's natural oils, leading to dry, cracked skin and the risk of occupational dermatitis. The effectiveness of Swarfega is due to the hydrophobic ingredients, including medium-chain (C9-C16) alkanes and cycloalkanes in combination with an emulsifier (Trideceth-5 in current formulations). These are more efficient at solubilizing oil and grease than a detergent alone.

In the UK, "Swarfega" may be a generic term for all similar cleaners, particularly if they have the same green jelly-like appearance as genuine Swarfega. According to the company website, the name derives from "swarf", a Derbyshire word for oil and grease, and "ega", as in "eager to clean". "Swarf" now commonly refers to the metal shavings and chips resulting from metalworking operations. The word did not initially mean oil or grease as Deb claimed, but rather the waste material from a grindstone (or similar material resulting from wear in a machine). This material would be a wet or oily mixture of grit abraded from the wheel and filings from the workpiece.

Deb has expanded its product range and has long offered products related to detergent ingredients or sold to the same mechanical trades. Many of these, such as Jizer, a water-rinsable degreaser used for washing mechanical parts rather than mechanics, first defined the original market for a new product that has become commonplace.

It was reported on 3 March 2010 that the manufacturer of Swarfega had been sold to an investment firm for £325 million.

In 2015, Deb Group Ltd. was acquired by S. C. Johnson & Son.

== Competing products ==
Swarfega has lost the ubiquity it once had. Many competing products exist, such as Rozalex Two Fives and Rozalex Gauntlet. Deb has even repositioned their own "Suprega" and "Tufanega" for industrial use. This has an orange colour, emphasising its "natural" origins and citrus oil ingredients. A similar orange-coloured product called "Dirty Paws" was available in the UK in the 1950s but is no longer available.

== See also ==
- List of cleaning products
