= Glume (disambiguation) =

A glume is part of the flower of grasses and sedges.

Glume may also refer to:

- Johann Georg Glume (1679–176?), German artist
- Friedrich Christian Glume (1714–1752), German artist
- Glüme (musician) - an American musician active in the 2020s.

== See also ==
- Gluma
