= Bath brick =

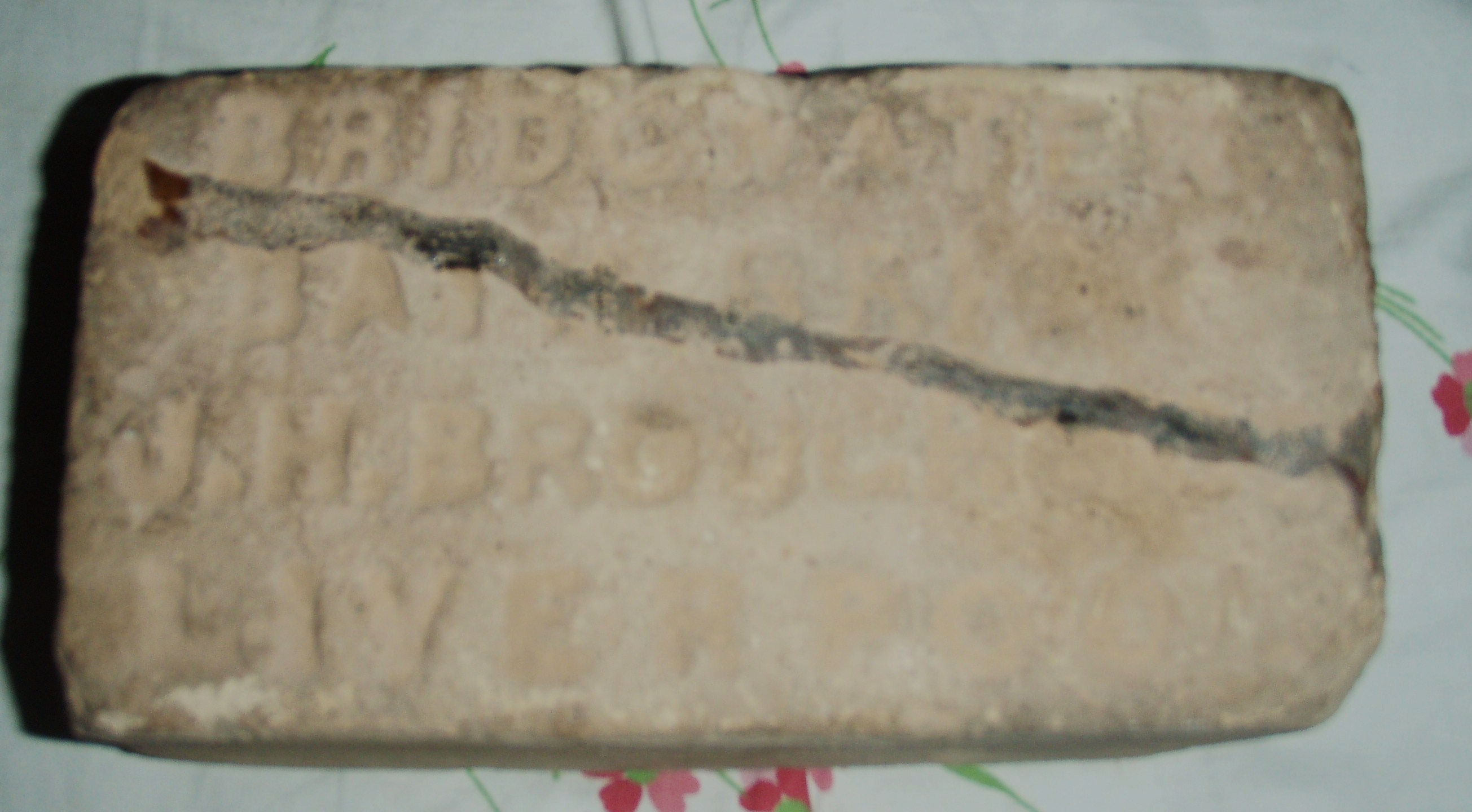
Bridgwater bath Brick, J.H.Brough & Co, Liverpool, found in India.

The bath brick (also known as Patent Scouring or Flanders bricks), patented in 1823 by William Champion and John Browne, was a predecessor of the scouring pad used for cleaning and polishing.

Bath bricks were made by a number of companies in the town of Bridgwater, England, from fine clay dredged from the River Parrett near Dunball. The silt, which was collected from the river on either side of the Town Bridge, contained fine particles of alumina and silica. It was collected from beds of brick rubble left in the rain for the salt to be washed out and then put into a "pugging mill" which was powered by a horse to be mixed, before being shaped into moulds and dried. These would be wrapped in paper and boxed for sale in England and throughout the British Empire. By the end of the 19th century around 24 million bath bricks had been produced in Bridgwater for the home and international markets.

The brick, similar in size to an ordinary house brick, could be used in a number of ways. A mild abrasive powder could be scraped from the brick and used as a scouring powder on floors and other surfaces. Powder could also be moistened with water for use on a cloth for polishing or as a kind of sand paper. Items such as knives might be polished directly on a wetted brick.

== See also ==
- List of cleaning products
