= Artemas Ward (writer) =

American writer (1848–1925)

Artemas Ward (May 28, 1848 – March 14, 1925) was an American writer and advertising executive. He is known for authoring several biographies as well as The Grocer's Encyclopedia.

== Biography ==
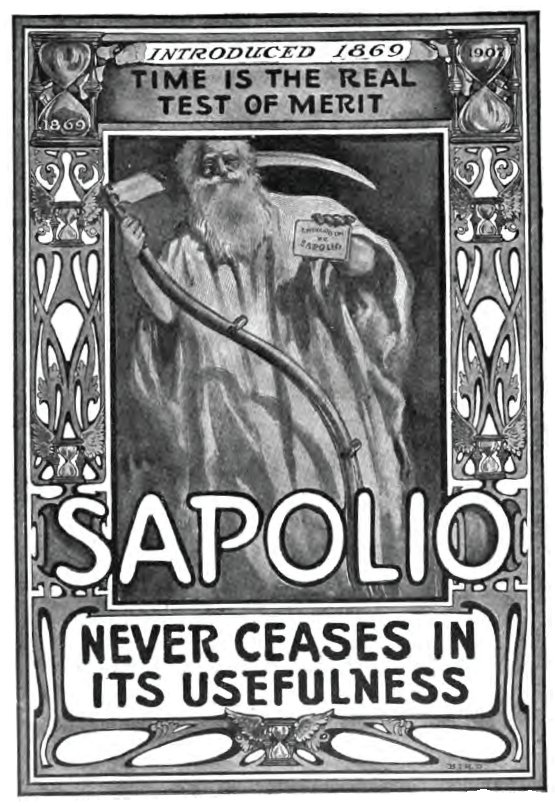
1907 advertisement for Sapolio soap

Ward, born May 28, 1848, was the great-grandson and namesake of Artemas Ward, a major general during the American Revolutionary War.

Ward's first position was in 1863 with the New York State Soldiers’ Depot. Later, Ward moved to Philadelphia, entering the Cuban export and import business, and next founded and published the Philadelphia Grocer. This led to an offer to manage advertising for household cleaner Sapolio Soap. He introduced the use of transit ads for Sapolio in almost all public transit vehicles in the country. He later obtained an exclusive franchise for the advertising facilities on New York City’s elevated railway and subway systems.

He was inducted into the Advertising Hall of Fame in 1975.
