= The Grocer's Encyclopedia =

1911 book by Artemas Ward

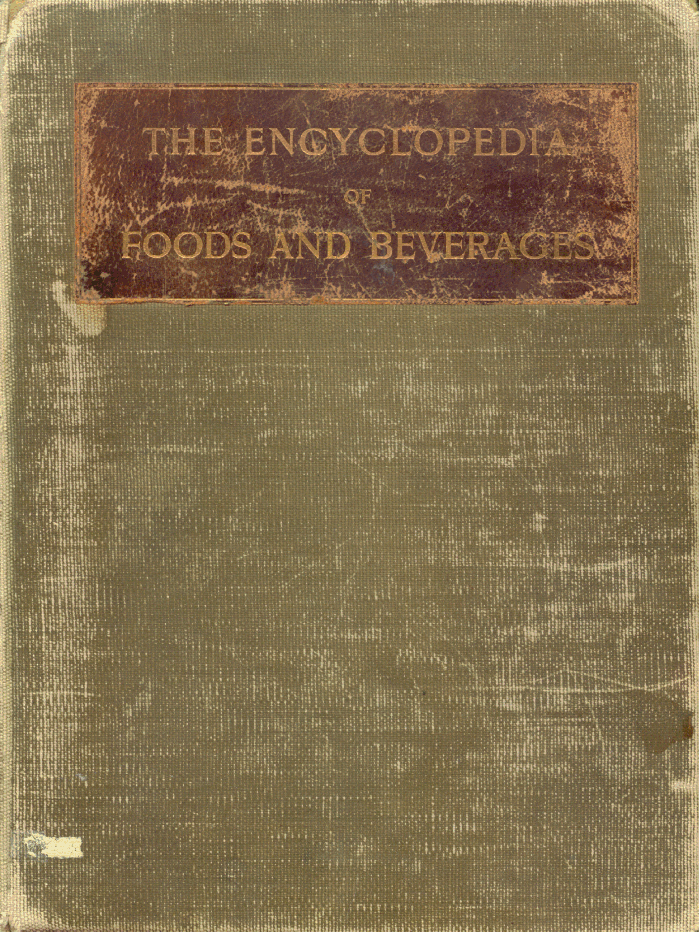
The Grocer's Encyclopedia - front cover

The Grocer's Encyclopedia (1911) is a book about the growing, preparation, and marketing of foods that was written and published in New York City by Artemas Ward, an author and an advertising and marketing innovator. Ward released a specialized edition of The Grocer's Encyclopedia entitled The Encyclopedia of Food and Beverages.

He later retitled the books for future editions of both The Grocer's Encyclopedia and The Encyclopedia of Food and Beverages to Encyclopedia of Foods.

== Synopsis ==
The work was developed out of a rudimentary publication by the author in 1882, The Grocer's Handbook, an effort which motivated him to refine the topic into the encyclopedia during "stolen minutes" throughout the thirty years intervening between the two publications.

The encyclopedia covers more than 1200 topics from abalone to zwetschgenwasser (a plum schnapps), with 80 color pages and 449 illustrations in all. The encyclopedia has 12 pages on cheese, 20 on wine, 16 on tea, and 7 on oysters. It also contains information on kosher foods, "new" meats such as kangaroo tails, cold storage, adulteration, labels, and guilds.

The book also has a 39-page appendix listing 500 names used to describe foods and drinks and translations of the terms in French, German, Italian, and Swedish.

== Reception ==
The Philadelphia Inquirer commented on the book in 1977, noting that copies were now considered collector's items and that "its contents opens an interesting window to a slice of bygone Americana."
