= Defense Soap =

Defense Soap is a company that markets and sells soap, barrier cream, equipment cleaners, sanitary wipes, and essential oils intended to address grappling specific cleanliness issues.

== Defense Soap (Product) ==
Defense Soap is a brand of soap (available in both bar and shower gel forms) created by Guy Sako to prevent outbreaks of skin infection on his wrestling team. Since then the soap has been marketed to wrestlers, Judoka, Jiu-Jitsu practitioners, and Mixed Martial Artists. Both the bar and shower gel versions of this soap are made with tea tree oil and eucalyptus extract, and are triclosan free. The manufacturers claim that Defense soap is effective in preventing MRSA, Staph, Impetigo, Ringworm, and Herpes. Defense Soap has been accepted as the official soap of USA Judo.

== Barrier Foam ==
Defense barrier foam is a type of barrier cream containing lanolin, aloe vera, jojoba oil, wheat germ extract, and vitamin E.

== Bar Soap ==
Defense soap carries several varieties of bar soap, including original, peppermint, oatmeal, and medicated. Their medicated soap is antifungal.

== Critical reception ==
Valerie Worthington of Breaking Muscle tested the shower gel version of Defense Soap and stated that, for people who train in close-quarters combat, it is "great option for keeping them active and skin condition-free".
