= Sapolio =

Brand of soap

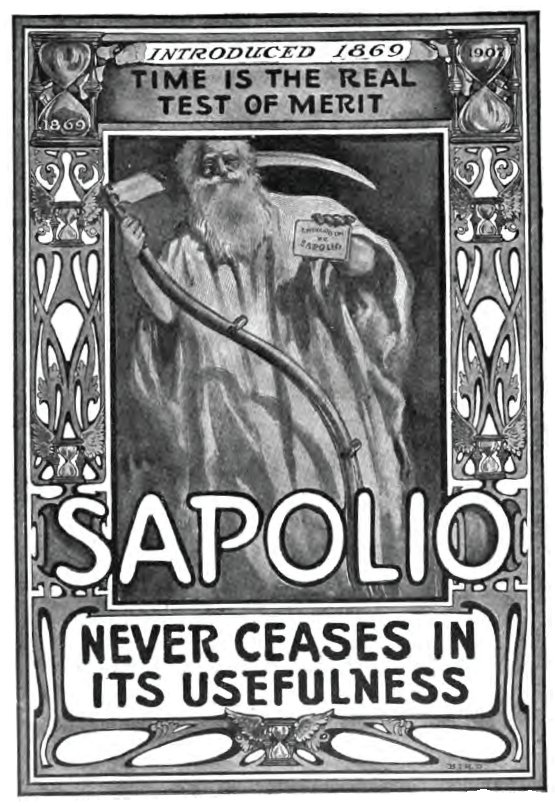
A 1907 advertisement for Sapolio soap

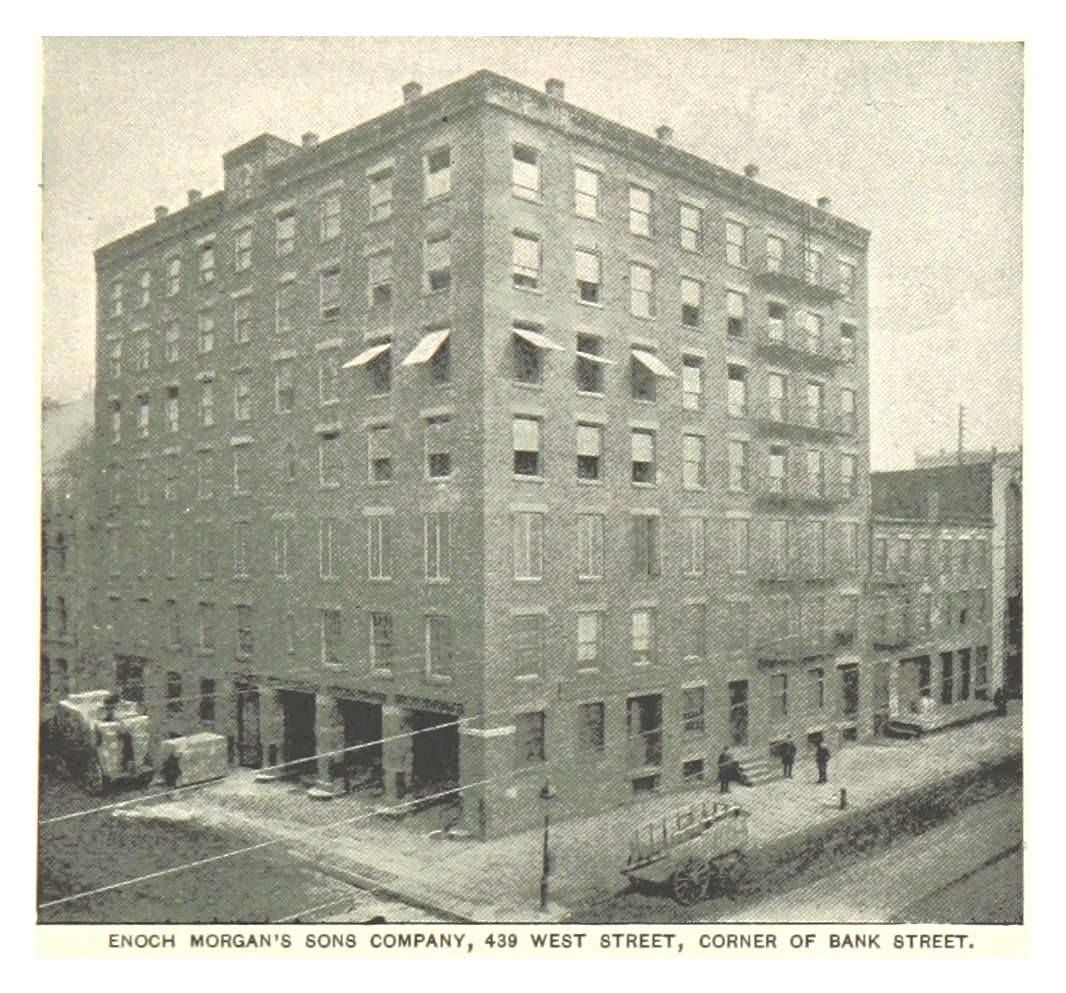
Enoch Morgan's Sons Company, 439 West Street, in 1893

Sapolio was a brand of soap noted for its advertising, led by Artemas Ward from 1883–1908. Bret Harte wrote jingles for the brand, and the sales force also included King Camp Gillette, who went on to create the Gillette safety razor and the razor and blades business model. Time magazine described Sapolio as "probably the world's best-advertised product" in its heyday.

Sapolio was manufactured by Enoch Morgan's Sons Co. in 1869 and was named after the family doctor.

James Kenneth Fraser, a copywriter and Cornell University engineering student, wrote in 1900 about the effectiveness of the soap in The Doctor's Lament:

This lean M.D. is Dr. Brown
Who fares but ill in Spotless Town.
The town is so confounded clean,
It is no wonder he is lean,
He's lost all patients now, you know,
Because they use Sapolio.

== Decline and disappearance ==
After decades of maintaining some of the best-known advertising in the U.S., Sapolio's owners decided that their position was sufficiently insurmountable to let them discontinue most advertising. Despite the brand's overwhelming market position, it was overtaken by competitors within a few years and disappeared before World War II.

== Revival ==
After the brand Sapolio disappeared, it remained under the domain of Enoch Morgan's Sons Co. until, after some negotiations, it was acquired by Procter & Gamble. However, they did not decide to relaunch the product until many years later, leaving the brand abandoned.

In 1997, the Sapolio brand was acquired by the Peruvian company Intradevco Industrial SA, who bought it from Procter & Gamble. Intradevco owns the Sapolio brand in more than 80 countries. The Sapolio brand now markets various cleaning products in Peru and Chile.

The Intradevco company also bought its Chilean counterpart Klenzo, which held the Sapolio patent in Chile.

In 2019, the Alicorp company bought the rights of Intradevco, which owns Sapolio, making it its parent company.

== References in popular culture ==
- In the children's book, The Hundred Dresses, the main character wonders if Wanda uses Sapolio to get her forehead to shine.
- Confidence man Soapy Smith was often called Sapolio Smith by the Rocky Mountain News.
- In the Ed Smalle, Jerry Macy version of Singing in the Bathtub (1930), Sapolio is used as a pun: "I Sapolio you think you're smart."
- In Robert Heinlein's To Sail Beyond the Sunset, Brian Smith (circa 1906) asks his wife, "Mo, the papers say that food prices are up even though the farmers are squawking. And I'm certain that this bigger house is costing you more to run, if only in electricity, gas and Sapolio. How much more each month do you need?"
- In the book, 60 years with Men and Machines, by Fred H. Colvin, (pages 122 - 123) references are made to the use of Sapolio as an abrasive in the manufacture of automobile engines, when the required fine lapping was performed by hand labor.
- In the 1905 novel, The House of Mirth, by Edith Wharton (Book I - Chapter IX), a reference is made to "the mingled odour of sapolio and furniture-polish".

== See also ==
- List of cleaning products
- Alicorp
