= Monkey Brand =

Brand of soap in the 18th and 19th centuries

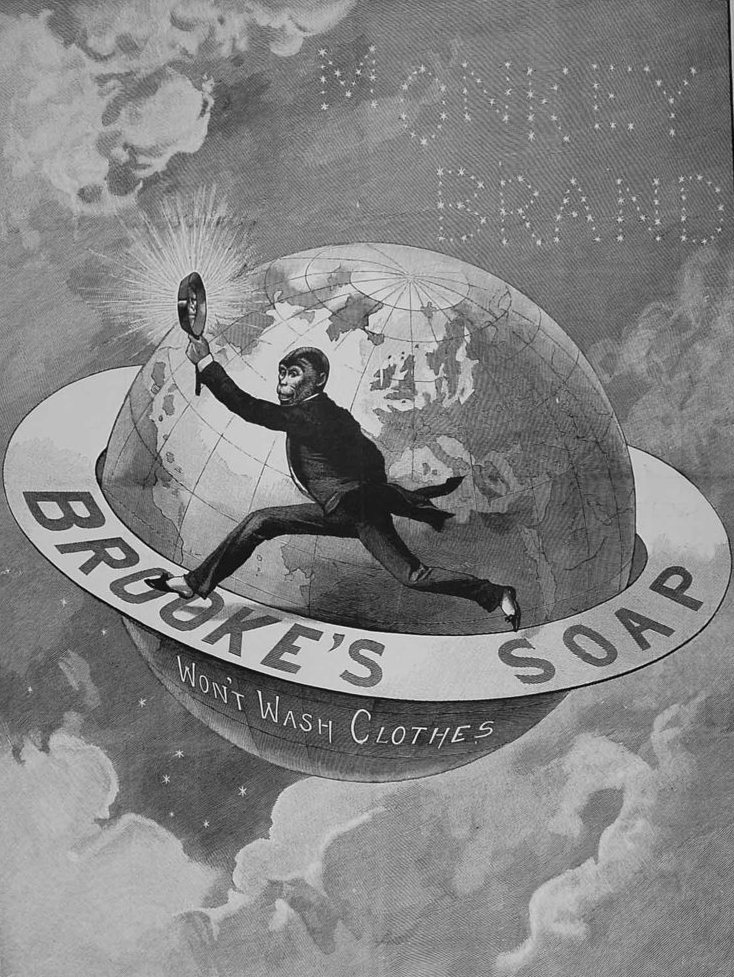
Brooke's Monkey Brand soap ad, The Illustrated London News, 5 May 1894

Monkey Brand soap was introduced in the 1880s in cake/bar form in the United States and United Kingdom as a household scouring and polishing soap.

== History ==
Initially, Benjamin Brooke & Co Ltd, a firm owned by Sidney and Henry Gross, had produced the soap in Philadelphia. The soap's highly abrasive agent was most likely pumice.

Lever Brothers bought the company in January 1899 and transferred the production of Monkey Brand soap to Port Sunlight near Liverpool. The name ‘Benjamin Brooke’ (hence Brooke's Monkey Brand) was retained to promote the Monkey Brand soap on both sides of the Atlantic.

In George Bernard Shaw's Pygmalion and the musical based on it (My Fair Lady), Henry Higgins tells his housekeeper to take Eliza Doolittle upstairs and clean her up, and to use "...Monkey Brand, if it won't come off any other way" (Act II). In the movie version, the line is changed to "...sandpaper, if it won't come off any other way." In Beatrix Potter's 1912 novel The Tale of Mr. Tod, Mr. Tod mentioned Monkey Soap as one of the soaps needed for cleaning his bedding.

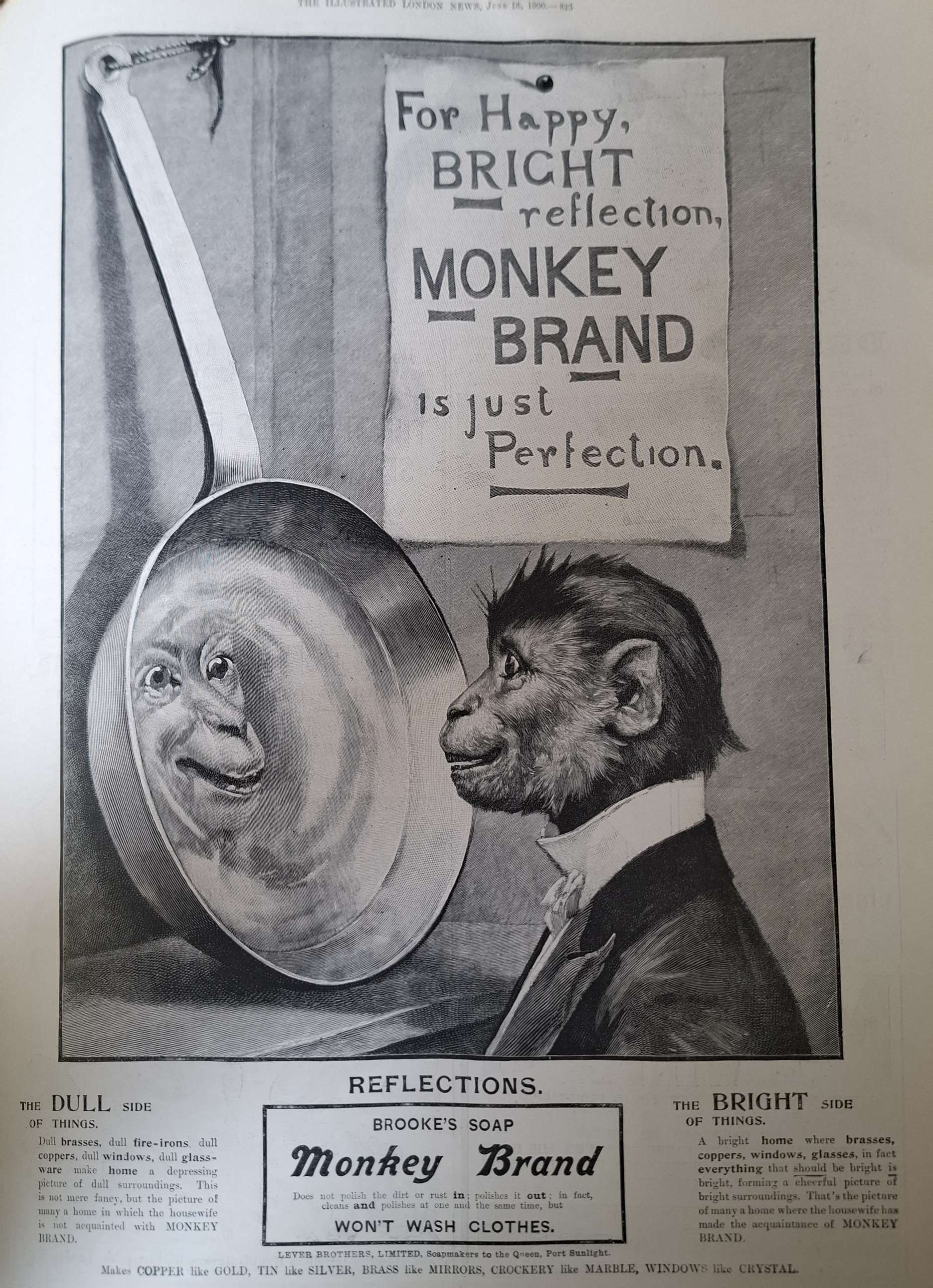
Photo of a Monkey Brand soap ad, as seen in The Illustrated London News, June 1900

The advertising campaign for Monkey Brand soap was used by cultural historians for analyzing Victorian values and social attitudes at the intersection of race, gender and class.

Gallery

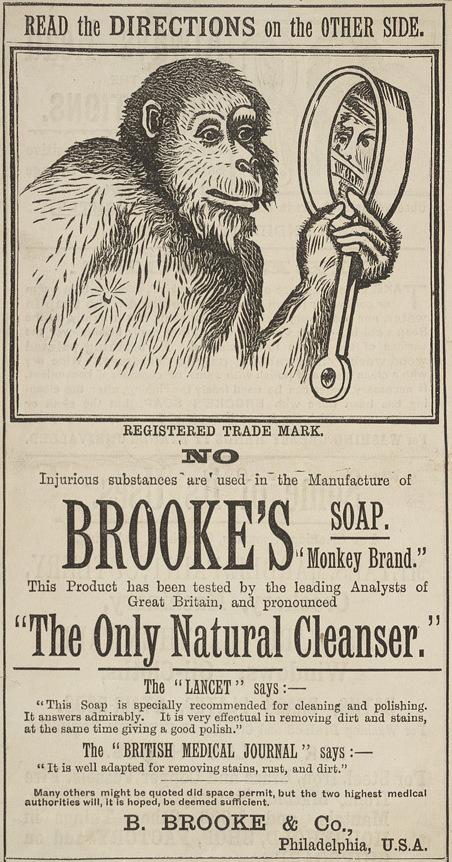

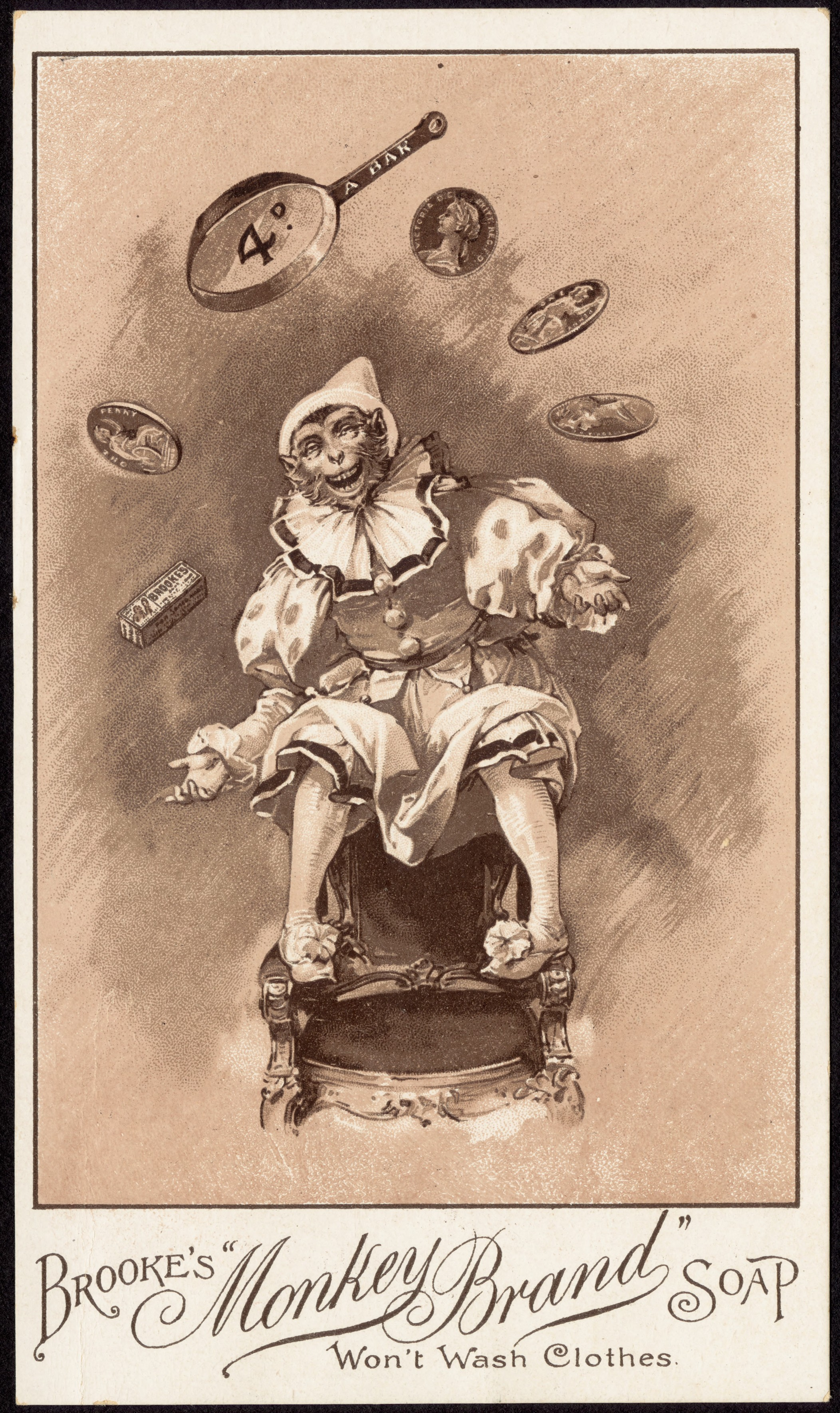

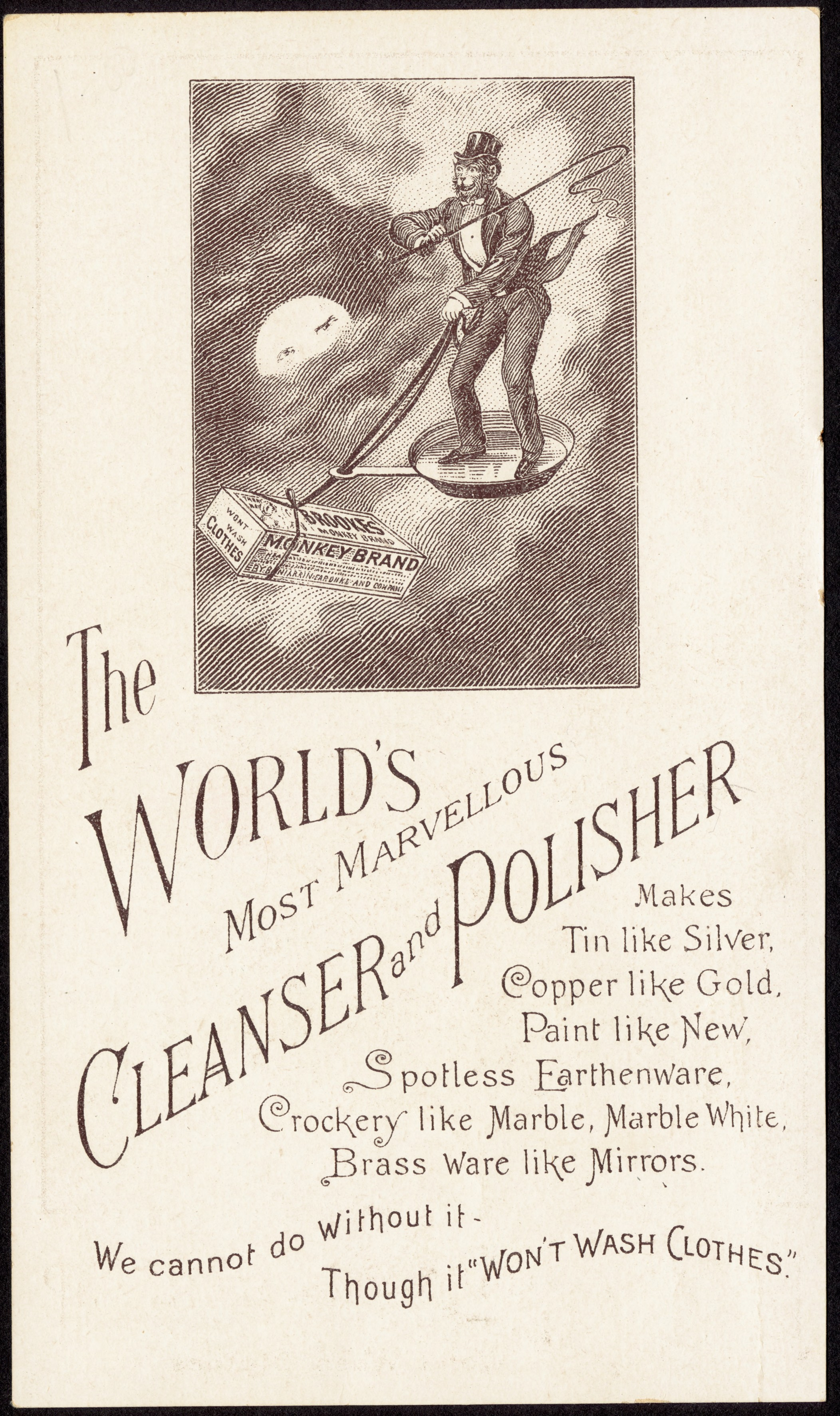

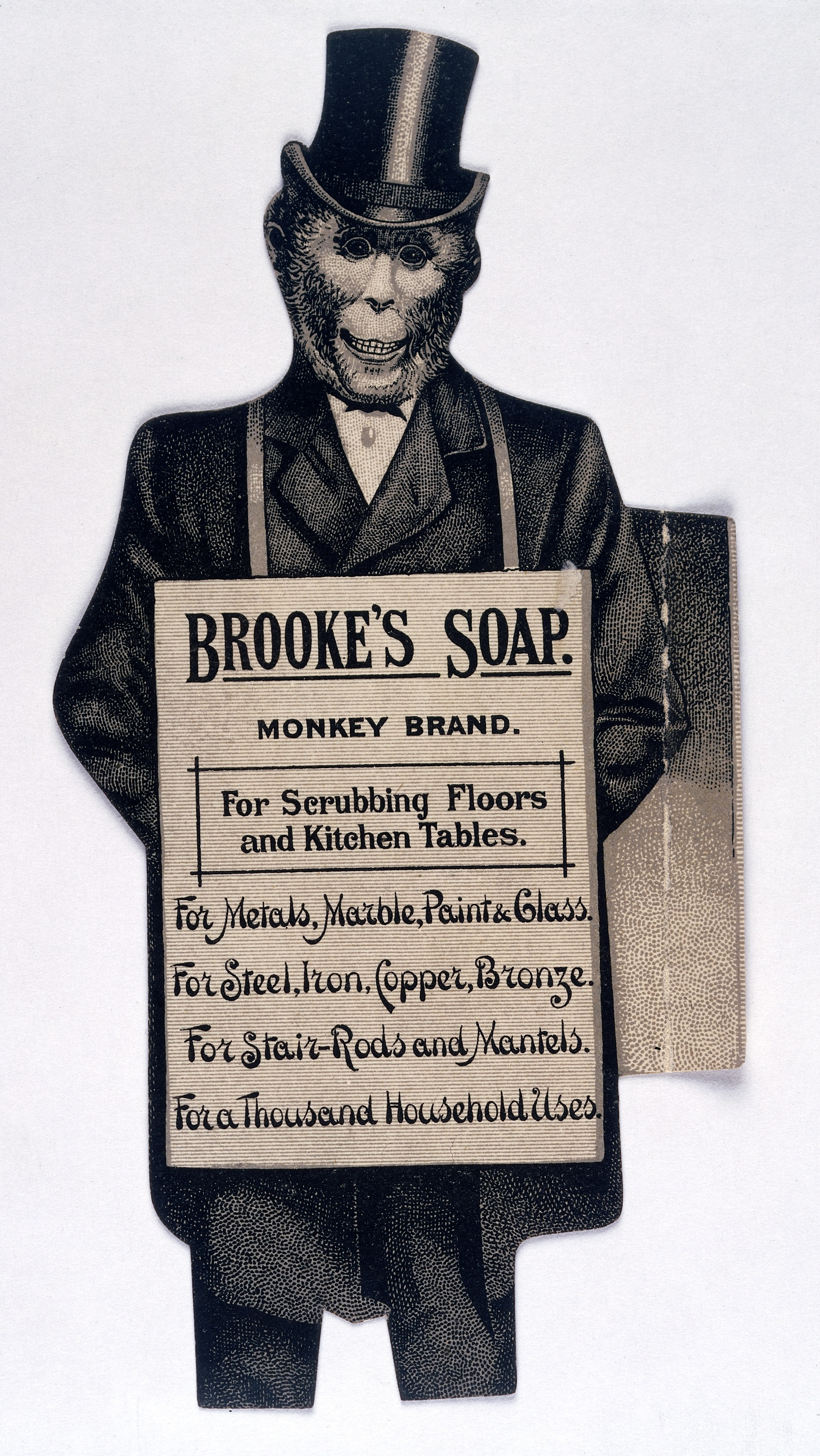

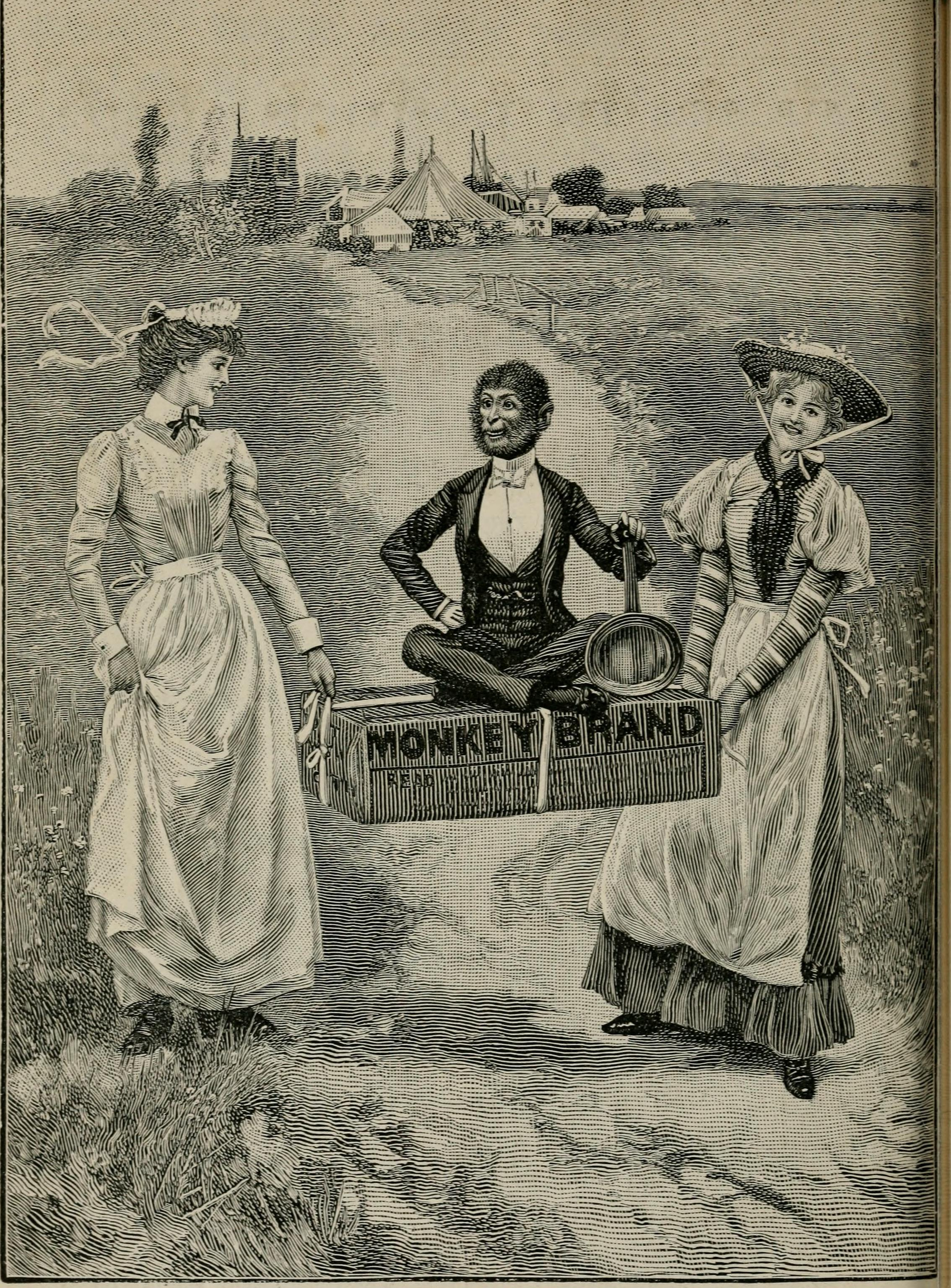

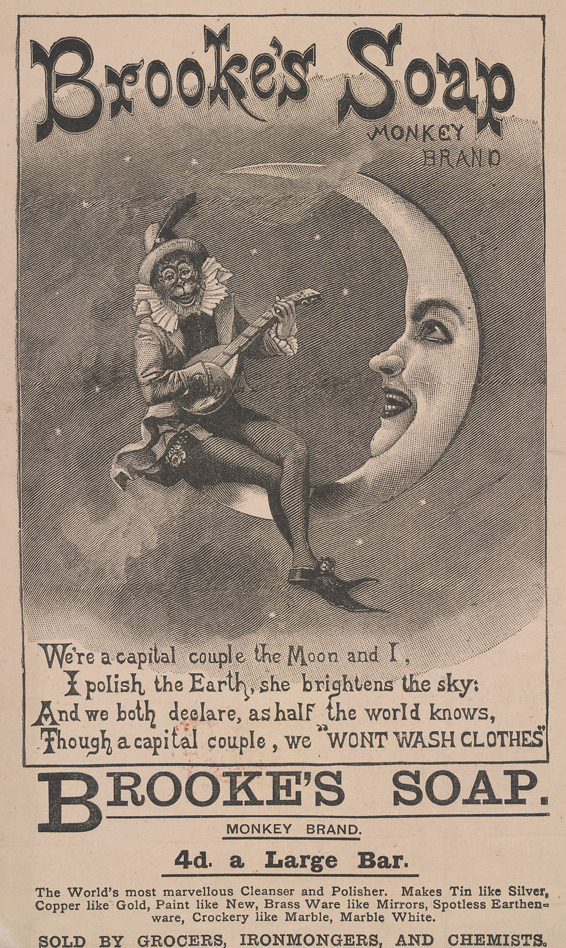

== See also ==
- List of cleaning products
