= Faso soap =

Faso soap or Fasoap is the brand of a Burkina Faso-manufactured type of soap, in the development stage, which ostensibly repels mosquitoes and thus protects from mosquito-borne diseases.

The company has shifted its focus from the Faso soap to a mosquito-repellent ointment called Maïa.

== Origins ==
Faso soap was developed in 2013 by two Institut International d'Ingénierie de l'Eau et de l'Environnement (International Institute of Water and Environmental Engineering) students-turned-entrepreneurs, Moctar Dembélé, from Burkina Faso, and Gérard Niyondiko, from Burundi.

== Composition and development ==
According to its developers, Faso soap is made of shea butter, lemongrass, African marigold and other "natural ingredients" that can be found in Burkina Faso. The soap's purpose is to leave an insect-repelling odor on the user's skin after washing.

The intent is to repel mosquitoes and thus prevent mosquito bites that can transmit diseases such as malaria, chikungunya, yellow fever, or dengue.

In April 2016, a crowd funding campaign was initiated in order to finance large-scale testing of the product and an amount of over 70,000 Euros was reportedly collected.

== Other soaps ==
A similar mosquito-repellent soap is in development at Johns Hopkins. The program, headed by Dr. Soumyadipta Acharya, uses permethrin in its soap. Permethrin is a shorter-lived compound that can "comfortably reside on [the] skin."

== See also ==
- Tropical diseases
- Neglected tropical diseases
- Diseases of poverty
- Eradication of infectious diseases
- Control of Communicable Diseases Manual
- World Health Organization
