= Shower Shock =

The original version of Shower Shock

Shower Shock is a peppermint scented glycerine soap that has been infused with caffeine. The manufacturer ThinkGeek claims that when the soap is used, caffeine is exuded in the lather to be absorbed through the user's skin. However, the idea that caffeine passes rapidly through the skin is unproven, and it has been suggested that the amount absorbed is not significant compared to a cup of coffee. Anecdotal accounts of using this soap also suggest that it is ineffective as a caffeine delivery method.

Adding peppermint oil to the body soap probably contributes to any perceived stimulating effect. Caffeine's ability to diffuse through human skin is minimal, and, as a result, users will generally not receive more than one to two milligrams (0.015 to 0.031 gr) of the drug through the soap itself.
