= Fruit and vegetable wash =

Food cleaning product

A vegetable wash is a cleaning product designed to aid in the removal process of dirt, wax and pesticides from fruit and vegetables before they are consumed.

== Contents and use ==
All fresh produce, even organic, can harbor residual pesticides, dirt or harmful microorganisms on the surface. Vegetable wash also removes germs, waxes on vegetable and fruits, and also the pesticides. Vegetable washes may either be a number of specially-marketed commercial brands, or they may be home recipes. Commercial vegetable washes generally contain surfactants, along with chelating agents, antioxidants, and other agents. Home recipes are generally dilutions of hydrogen peroxide or vinegar, the former of which may be dangerous at high concentrations.

== Effectiveness ==
Neither the U.S. Food and Drug Administration nor the United States Department of Agriculture recommend washing fruits and vegetables in anything other than cold water. To date, there is little evidence that vegetable washes are effective at reducing the presence of harmful microorganisms, though their application in removing simple dirt and wax is not contested.
