= Woolite =

Laundry detergent brand

- Product type: Laundry detergent; Cleaning products
- Current owner: Reckitt Benckiser
- Country: United States
- Introduced: 1951; 75 years ago
- Previous owners: Boyle-Midway, American Home Products/Wyeth
- Tagline: Clothes look new for longer
- Website: www.woolite.us

Woolite is an American brand of laundry detergent and cleaning products introduced in 1951. The English-Dutch company Reckitt Benckiser acquired the Woolite brand in 1991 when it bought Boyle-Midway from American Home Products / Wyeth. The company manufactures laundry accessories, among other consumer goods.

Bissell Inc., under license from Reckitt Benckiser, manufactures Woolite carpet cleaner, which Bissell bought from Playtex in 2004.
