= Hexachlorophene =

Chemical compound

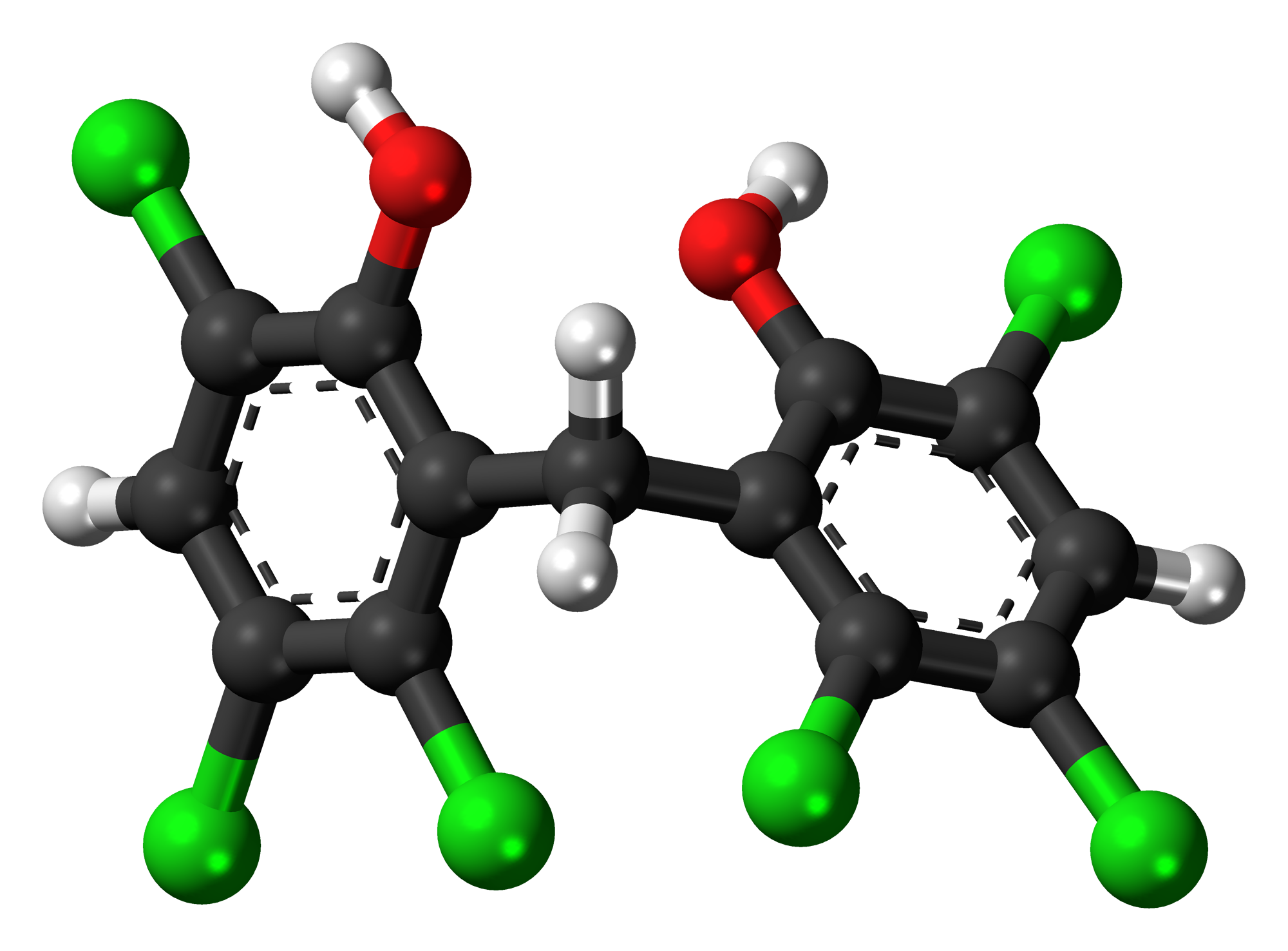

Clinical data
- Trade names: pHisoHex, Gamophen, Septisol, Turgex, Germa-Medica, Hexachlorophane, Almederm
- ATC code: D08AE01 (WHO) QP52AG02 (WHO)

Legal status
- Legal status: US: ℞-only for human use; Rx-only for human use

Identifiers
- IUPAC name: 2,2'-methylenebis(3,4,6-trichlorophenol)-3,4,6-trichloro-2-[(2,3,5-trichloro-6-hydroxyphenyl)methyl]phenol
- CAS Number: 70-30-4
- PubChem CID: 3598
- DrugBank: DB00756
- ChemSpider: 3472
- UNII: IWW5FV6NK2
- KEGG: D00859
- ChEBI: CHEBI:5693
- ChEMBL: ChEMBL496
- CompTox Dashboard (EPA): DTXSID6020690
- ECHA InfoCard: 100.000.667

Chemical and physical data
- Formula: C_{13}H_{6}Cl_{6}O_{2}
- Molar mass: 406.89 g·mol^{−1}
- 3D model (JSmol): Interactive image
- Density: 1.71 g/cm^{3}
- Melting point: 163 to 165 °C (325 to 329 °F)
- Boiling point: 471 °C (880 °F)
- SMILES: C1=C(C(=C(C(=C1Cl)Cl)CC2=C(C(=CC(=C2Cl)Cl)Cl)O)O)Cl
- InChI: InChI=1S/C13H6Cl6O2/c14-6-2-8(16)12(20)4(10(6)18)1-5-11(19)7(15)3-9(17)13(5)21/h2-3,20-21H,1H2; Key:ACGUYXCXAPNIKK-UHFFFAOYSA-N

Hexachlorophene, also known as Nabac, is an organochlorine compound that was once widely used as a disinfectant. The compound occurs as a white odorless solid, although commercial samples can be off-white and possess a slightly phenolic odor. It is insoluble in water but dissolves in acetone, ethanol, diethyl ether, and chloroform. In medicine, hexachlorophene is useful as a topical anti-infective and anti-bacterial agent. It is also used in agriculture as a soil fungicide, plant bactericide, and acaricide. It has also been reported to bind tubulin, blocking its polymerization.

== Production ==
Hexachlorophene is produced by alkylation of 2,4,5-trichlorophenol with formaldehyde. Related antiseptics are prepared similarly, e.g., bromochlorophene and dichlorophene.

== Safety ==
The LD50 (oral, rat) is 59 mg/kg, indicating that the compound is relatively toxic. It is neither mutagenic nor teratogenic according to Ullmann's Encyclopedia, but "embryotoxic and produces some teratogenic effects" according to the International Agency for Research on Cancer. 2,3,7,8-Tetrachlorodibenzodioxin (TCDD) is always a contaminant in this compound's production. Several accidents releasing many kilograms of TCDD have been reported. The reaction between 2,4,5-trichlorophenol and formaldehyde is exothermic. If the reaction occurs without adequate cooling, TCDD is produced in significant quantities as a byproduct and contaminant. The Seveso disaster and the Times Beach, Missouri, contamination incident exemplify the industrial hazards of hexachlorophene production.

== Selective removal from market ==
=== France ===
In 1972, the "Bébé" brand of baby powder in France killed 39 babies. It also did great damage to the central nervous systems of several hundred other babies. The batch of toxic "Bébé" brand of powder was mistakenly manufactured with 6% hexachlorophene. This industrial accident directly led to the removal of hexachlorophene from consumer products worldwide.

=== United States ===
In 1972, the U.S. Food and Drug Administration (FDA) halted production and distribution of products containing more than 1% hexachlorophene. After that change, most products containing hexachlorophene were available only with a doctor's prescription. The restrictions were enacted after 15 deaths in the United States, and the 39 deaths in France mentioned above, were reported following brain damage caused by hexachlorophene.

Several companies manufactured over-the-counter preparations that utilised hexachlorophene in their formulations. One product, Baby Magic Bath by The Mennen Company, was recalled in 1971, and removed from retail distribution.

Two commercial preparations using hexachlorophene, pHisoDerm and pHisoHex, were widely used as antibacterial skin cleansers in the treatment of acne, (with pHisoDerm developed for those allergic to the active ingredients in pHisoHex). During the 1960s, both were available over the counter in the US. After the ban, pHisoDerm was reformulated without hexachlorophene, and continued to be sold over-the-counter, while pHisoHex, (which contained 3% hexachlorophene - 3 times the legal limit imposed in 1972), became available as a prescription body wash. In the European Community countries during the 1970s and 1980s, pHisoHex remained available over the counter. A related product, pHisoAc, was used as a skin mask to dry and peel away acne lesions whilst pHiso-Scrub, a hexachlorophene-impregnated sponge for scrubbing, has since been discontinued. Several substitute products (including triclosan) were developed, but none had the germ-killing capability of hexachlorophene. (Sanofi-Aventis became the sole European manufacturer of pHisoHex, while The Mentholatum Company owns the pHisoDerm brand today. Sanofi-Aventis discontinued production of several forms of pHisoHex in August 2009 and discontinued all production of pHisoHex in September 2013).

The formula for Dial soap was modified to remove hexachlorophene after the FDA ended over-the-counter availability in 1972.

Bristol-Myers' discontinued Ipana toothpaste brand at one time contained hexachlorophene. Another US brand of toothpaste containing hexachlorophene in the early 1960s was Stripe.

=== Germany ===
In Germany, cosmetics containing hexachlorophene have been banned since 1985.

=== Austria ===
In Austria, the sale of drugs containing the substance has been banned since 1990.

== Trade names ==
Trade names for hexachlorophene include: Acigena, Almederm, AT7 (dial soap), AT17, Bilevon, Exofene, Fostril, Gamophen, G-11, Germa-Medica, Hexosan, K-34, Septisol, Surofene, M3.
