= Phisoderm =

Skin detergent

Phisoderm is a skin detergent which assists persons who are allergic to soap and Phisohex, a detergent and sudsless cleanser which prevents the spread of infections. In the 1950s, both Phisoderm and Phisohex were manufactured by Winthrop Laboratories. Earlier, the product was made by Fairchild Brothers & Foster. Phisoderm was developed by B. Thurber Guild (1886–1958), a physician and pharmaceutical manufacturer. Guild practiced medicine in Boston, Massachusetts, and was a specialist in allergies. The brand is currently owned by Mentholatum.

== Withdrawal from sale and reinstatement ==
Both Phisoderm and Phisohex were removed from drugstores and retail outlet stores when the US Food and Drug Administration halted the production and distribution of products containing more than 1% of hexachlorophene in September 1972.

Phisoderm continued to be produced by Winthrop Laboratories, a division of Sterling Drug, in 1980. An over-the-counter drug, its advertising was carried out by Warren Muller Dulubowsky.

By April 1989, Sterling Drug was owned by Eastman Kodak. Three Sterling brands, Haley's M-O, Philips' Milk of Magnesia, and Phisoderm, were being advertised by N.W. Ayer.

In 1991, the Phisoderm account was picked up by Ammirati & Puris of New York City. When Bayer bought Sterling in 1994, Chattem acquired the Phisoderm brand.

In 2005, it was sold to The Mentholatum Company.

In the current formulation, as of 2023, the anti-acne active ingredient is 2% salicylic acid.
