= Rozalex =

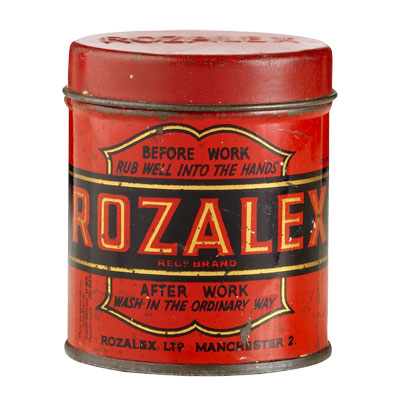
Rozalex original tin

Rozalex was a brand of Rozalex Limited, a subsidiary of the Chloride Electrical Storage Company credited with being the first company in the United Kingdom to commercialise topical barrier cream for use in an industrial setting.

The cream was originally developed for use in their Exide works at Clifton Junction near Manchester. Battery manufacture was labour-intensive and used hazardous materials, so skin irritation and contact dermatitis were rife among workers. Chloride began researching and developing a barrier cream that could help protect workers and increase productivity.

== Company history ==
Rozalex – 1956 Advertising

The company was founded in 1929 as a spin-off of The Chloride Electrical Storage Co. Ltd.

In 1969, Newton, Chambers & Company acquired Rozalex Limited and the brand sat along other household names such as IZAL and Zalpon.

In 1972, Newton, Chambers & Co was acquired by the Central & Sheerwood Trust, an Investment banking and financial services group.

In 1973, Central & Sheerwood Trust sold the IZAL operation, which included Rozalex, to Sterling Winthrop's, Sterling Industrial.

In 1981, Sterling Industrial acquired the Kerodex range of industrial barrier creams and merged them into the Rozalex Range.

In 1987, Unilever acquired Sterling Industrial strategically to push into the business-to-business hygiene, janitorial, and floor care sectors.

In 2002, Unilever sold the main equity share of its business-to-business division (Lever Industrial-DiverseyLever) to SC Johnson to form JohnsonDiversey.

In 2008, JohnsonDiversey divested the Rozalex brand to Present Value Limited, and Rozalex Limited was reinstated.

In 2010, Rozalex sponsored the Ginetta G50 car of the Barwell Motorsport team in the 2010 British Touring Car Championship TOCA series driven by Julien Draper.

In 2011, Rozalex sponsored the Barwell Motorsport team's Aston Martin GT4 car at the 2011 British GT Championship, driven by Peter Erceg and Tiff Needell.

In 2011, Rozalex sponsored the Greenpower Education Trust promoting sustainable engineering to young people.

In 2011, Rozalex teamed up with Goodwood to supply limited edition tins of handcare products for the 2011 Goodwood Revival.

In 2012, Present Value divested the Rozalex brand to Hughen Limited. Rozalex is currently a fully trading subsidiary of Hughen Limited.

In 2013, Rozalex launched a new Pouch Dispensing System (PDS) for the Industrial / Engineering / Automotive / Marine / Construction and Energy sectors.
