= Colour Catcher =

Laundry product

Colour Catcher packaging

Colour Catcher is a brand name of colour run prevention products manufactured by Spotless Group. Colour Catcher is distributed by Spotless Punch in the United Kingdom, by Punch Industries in Ireland, in Spain as Atrapa Color, by Eau Ecarlate in France as Décolor Stop, and by Guaber in Italy as Acchiappacolore.

== History ==
Colour Catcher was invented by Pat McNamee at Irish company Punch Industries in 1993. The product was created in the company's labs at Little Island, Cork.

== Product description ==
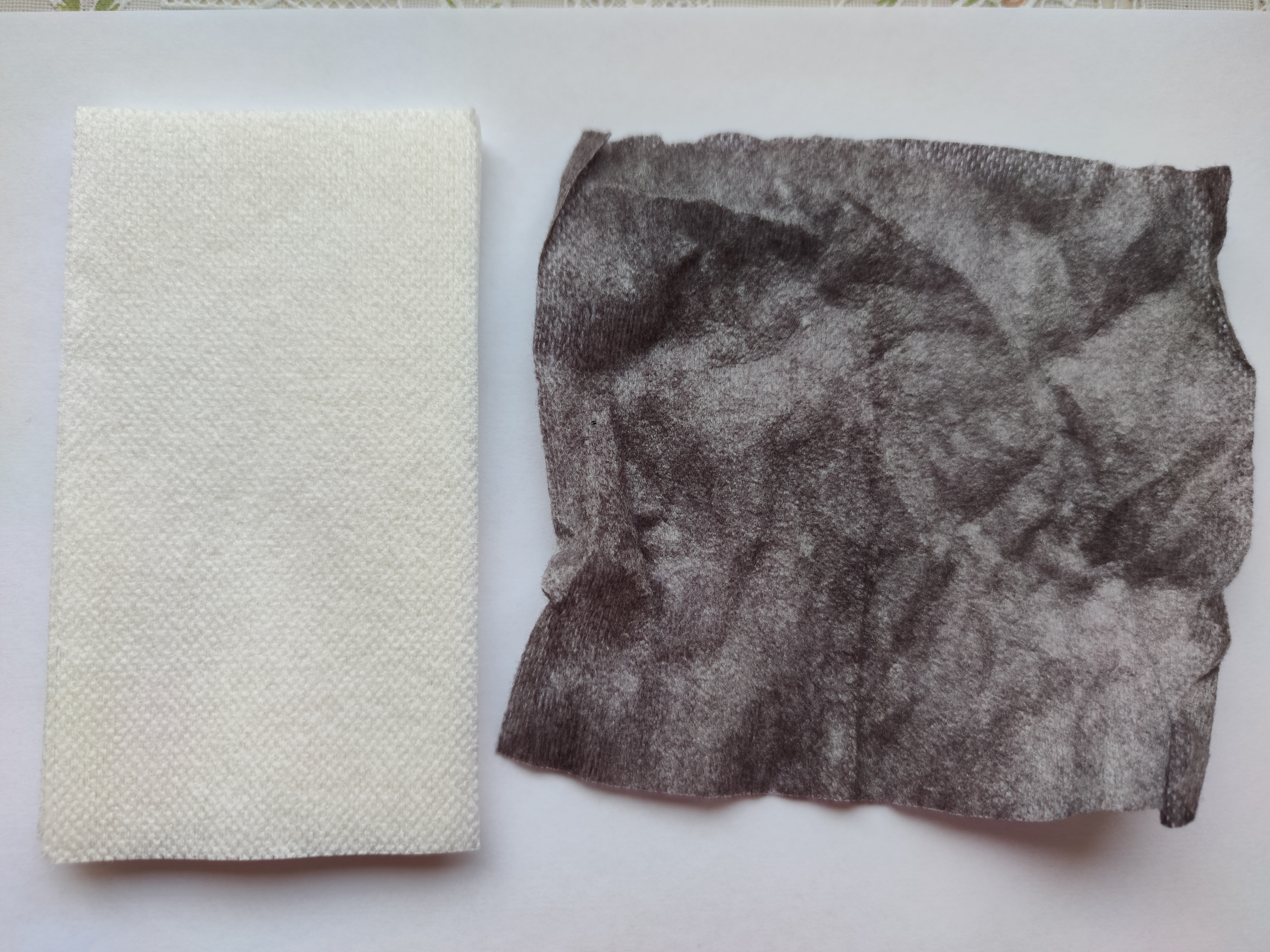
A similar product before and after use

Colour Catcher products are claimed to prevent colour runs in washing machine cycles and allow coloured and whites to be washed together without incurring colour run accidents. They are sold in boxes of 10–20 paper-like sheets, which are intended to absorb the excess dyes which garments release during the washing process.

To help prevent a Colour Catcher sheet from jamming the inner workings of a washing machine, it can be helpful to put the sheet into a mesh delicates wash bag.

== International ==
The Colour Catcher brand is marketed in the United States by S.C. Johnson under its Shout brand (the US product omits the "u" in colour, in accordance with American English). Colour Catcher is sold in most European states and Cyprus, Australia, the United Arab Emirates, and Russia.

Colour Catcher sheets are not sold in Canada; one competing product available in Canada is called "Dr. Beckmann Colour & Dirt Collector".
