= Cresolene =

Bottle of Cresolene

Cresolene is a dark liquid with a pungent smell made from coal tar used in the 19th and early 20th century as a disinfectant and to treat various ailments such as colds and measles. Most well known of all cresolene products was the Vapo-Cresolene lamp, used to heat the substance so that the fumes could be inhaled; these were produced between 1879 and 1957.

== See also ==
- Cresol
- Resin
