= Fenjal =

Switz hygiene company

Fenjal is a brand of cosmetic hygiene products marketed around the world by the pharmaceutical and cosmetics company Doetsch Grether AG of Basel, Switzerland.

The company was founded in 1899 and the first Fenjal product was a crème bath introduced in 1962 with the notable feature that the formula included plant oil.

The brand range now includes soap, bath oil, body lotion, body wash, bubble bath, shower oil, shower mousse and other skin care products. On June 1, 2016, Fit GmbH from Hirschfelde took over the brand from Doetsch-Grether AG. Since 2016, production has also taken place at the Hirschfelde site.

== See also ==
- List of pharmaceutical companies
- Pharmaceutical industry in Switzerland
