= Ach. Brito =

Portuguese company that manufactures soaps, bath salts, and cosmetic products

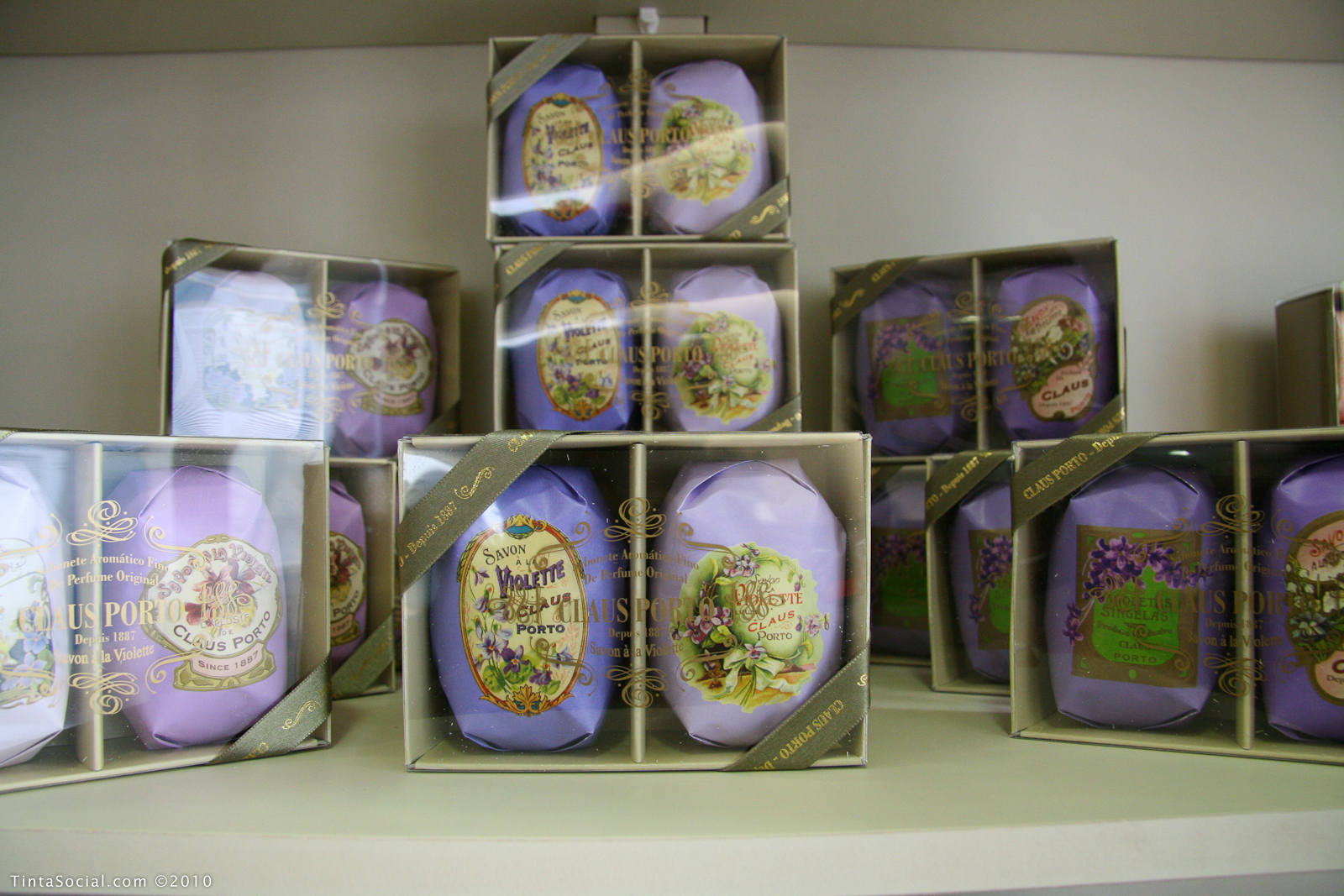
Claus Porto (Ach. Brito) Soaps

Ach Brito & Ca., S.A. is a Portuguese company that manufactures soaps, bath salts and aromatic candles, among other cosmetic products. It is based in Fajozes, Vila do Conde.

== History ==
Ach. Brito was founded by Ferdinand Claus and Georges Ph. Schweder, two Germans who had chosen to settle in Portugal. They started, in 1887, Claus & Schweder, the first national soap and perfume factory. The products were sold under the brand "FPC – Fábrica de Produtos Chimicos Claus & Schweder, Sucrs".

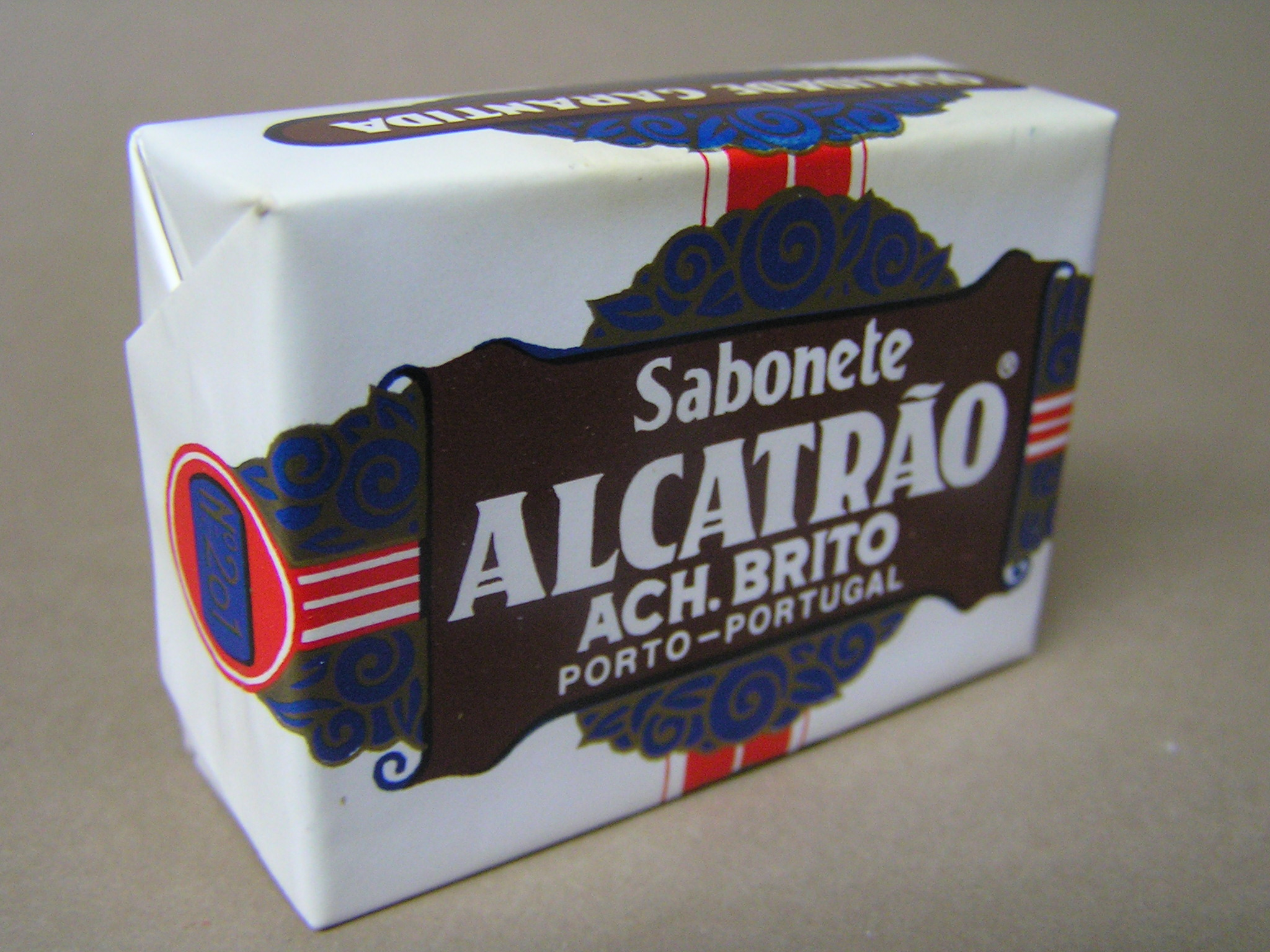
Sabonete Alcatrão, one of the first to be produced by Ach. Brito

The soaps are made by manually milling them, and then after drying, workers wrap them in colorful Art Deco wrapping. Oprah Winfrey included them on her list of Oprah's Favorite Things in 2007, calling them "a labor of love".

== See also ==
- List of companies of Portugal
