= Ghari Detergent =

Brand of detergent

Ghadi Detergent
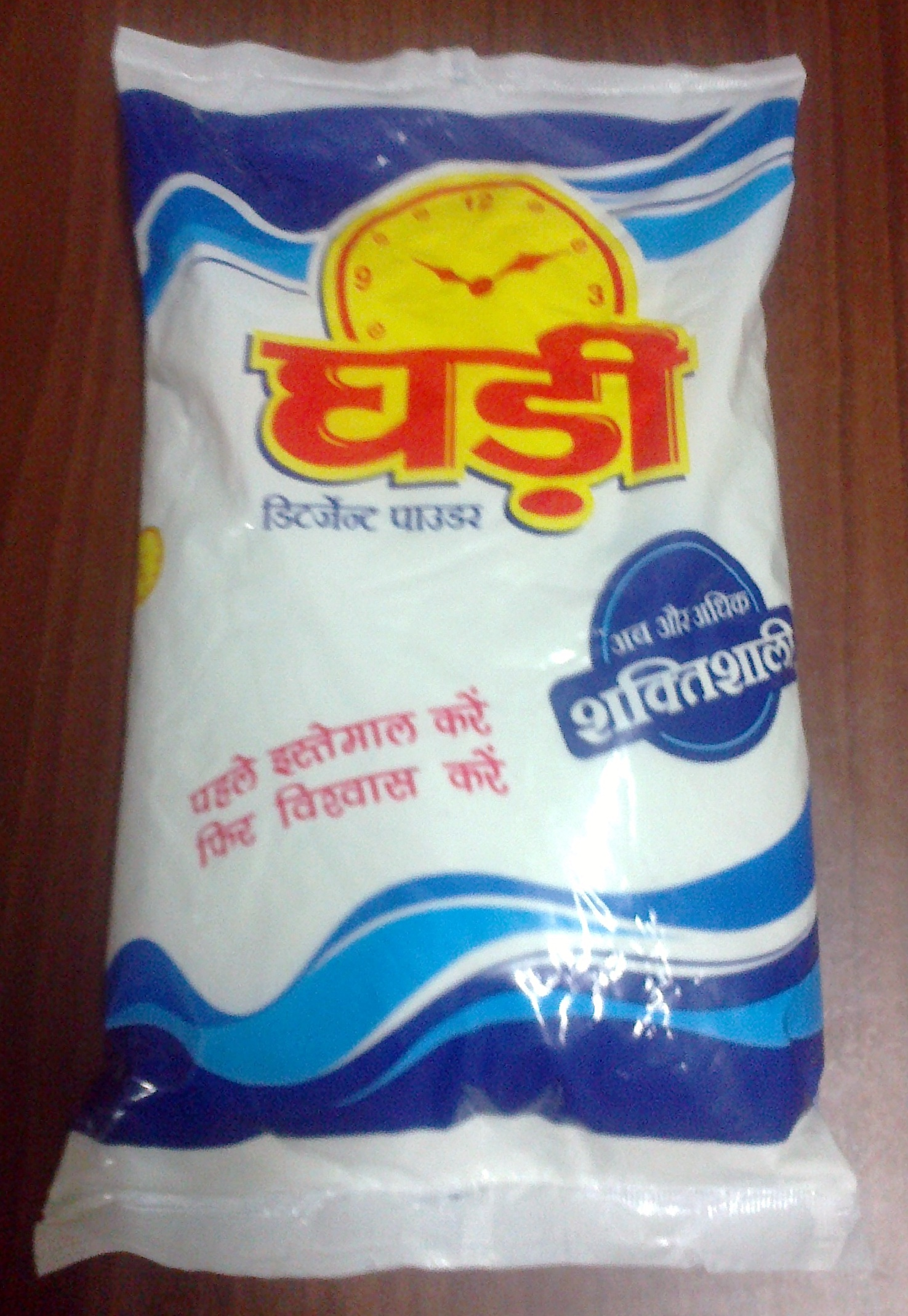
- Product type: Laundry detergent
- Current owner: RSPL Limited (RSPL)
- Introduced: 1987
- Website: ghadimachinewash.com

Ghadi Detergent powder is a detergent manufactured by RSPL Limited (RSPL), a Kanpur based company with a net worth of more than 8,000 crore as a diversified conglomerate in India. When Ghadi was launched, market was already dominated by big brands like Surf and Nirma. The detergent brand was founded by Muralidhar Gyanchandani (Chairman RSPL Group) and Bimal Kumar Gyanchandani (Vice Chairman) in 1988. According to the 2022 Hurun Rich List, their combined net worth was Rs 20,000 crore.
