= L'Amande =

Italian soap company

L'Amande, founded in 1884, is an Italian company that manufactures Marseille soap. It is now one of the oldest soap brands in the world.
