= Guar hydroxypropyltrimonium chloride =

Names
- Other names Guar, 2-hydroxy-3-trimethylammoniopropyl ether, chloride Cationic guar

Identifiers
CAS Number	65497-29-2
ECHA InfoCard	100.114.215
EC Number	613-809-4
UNII	B16G315W7A
CompTox Dashboard (EPA)	DTXSID6095459

Properties
Density	1.3

Hazards
- Lethal dose or concentration (LD, LC)
LD_{50} (median dose)	1.25g/kg rat
- Except where otherwise noted, data are given for materials in their standard state (at 25 °C [77 °F], 100 kPa). Infobox references

Guar hydroxypropyltrimonium chloride is an organic compound that is a water-soluble quaternary ammonium derivative of guar gum. It gives conditioning properties to shampoos and after-shampoo hair care products. The effects of the cationic charge density, guar concentration in aqueous solution, and treatment time on bleached European hair have been studied. A mechanical testing method has been successfully applied to determine the efficacy of cationic guars to improve the ease of combing. The results were confirmed in a shampoo formulation on both virgin and bleached hair.
