= Luvil =

Luvil is a clothes detergent manufactured by Unilever. It was sold and advertised in the United Kingdom in the 1960s - but later withdrawn from this market; the product however is still on sale in Continental Europe.

The 1960s UK TV adverts were well known for their slogans and now dated style:

1. Luvil gets children's clothes clean - it works like an underwater army
2. Harassed mother by sink: "Oh no ― give me strength" - voiceover: "You've got it with Luvil's underwater army!"
3. This packet of Luvil holds an underwater army of enzymes ― to beat egg, sweat marks, blood spots, cocoa stains
