= Tawashi =

Japanese scrubbing brush

A tawashi (たわし or 束子; lit. a bundle) is a scrubbing brush for wet cleaning, of a style that is popular in Japan. Tawashis are traditionally made from hemp palm. In Japan, sponges used for scrubbing are now treated as forms of tawashi.

== Types ==
Several synthetic polymers are frequently seen:

- A polyurethane sponge is sometimes called sponge tawashi (スポンジたわし, suponji tawashi).
- An acrylic tawashi (アクリルたわし, akuriru tawashi) is made of acrylic, typically knitted or crocheted.
- Kameno tawashi (亀の子束子) is the traditional tawashi made from palm fiber.
- Kinzoku tawashi (金属たわし), used to describe brass or stainless steel scrubbers.
- Some tawashis are now crocheted from cotton yarn, producing the eco-friendly tawashi (エコたわし, eko tawashi), which is scratch-free, and used for dishes and small cleaning jobs.
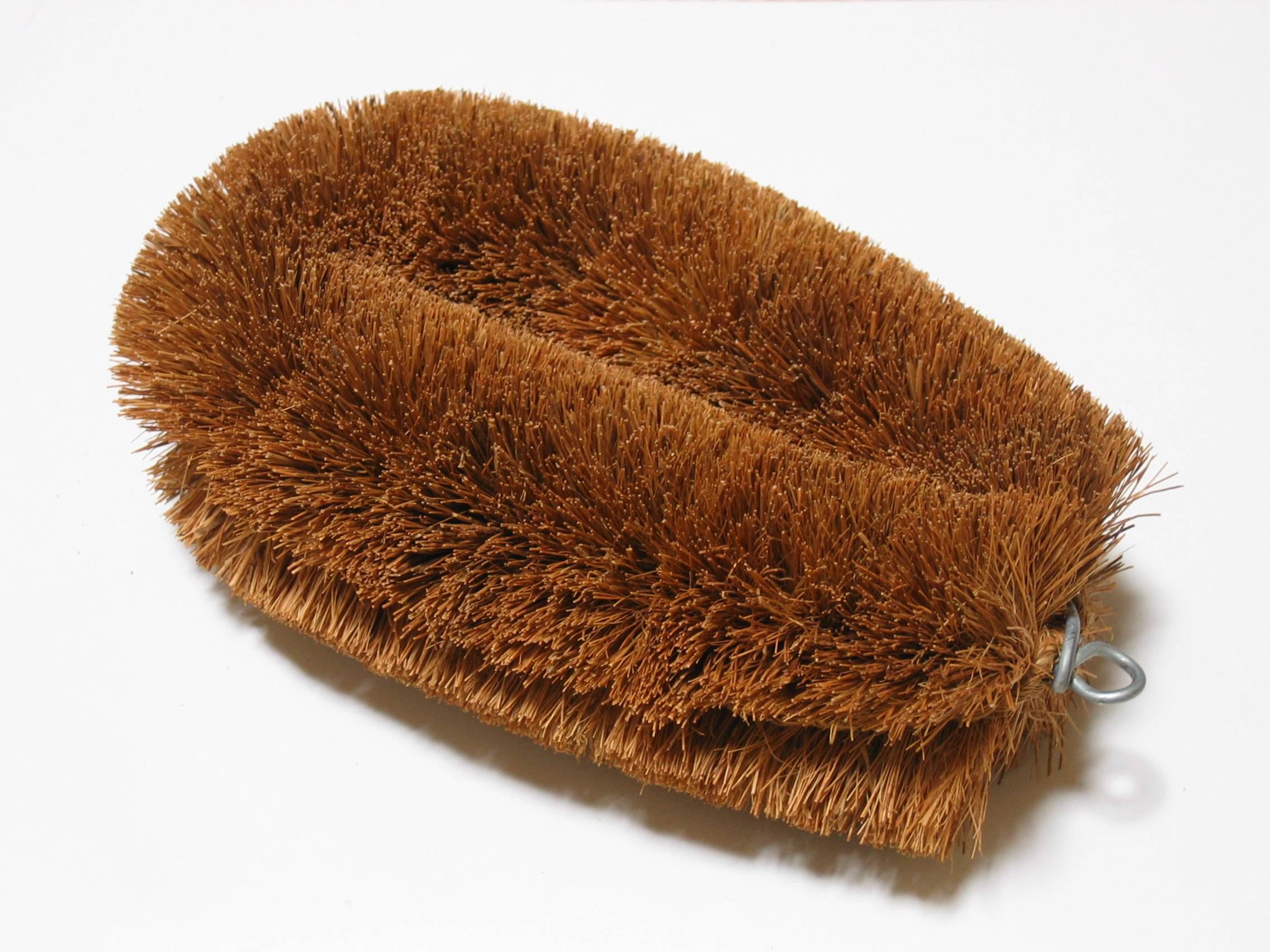
A popular Japanese design for a tawashi, said to resemble a young turtle

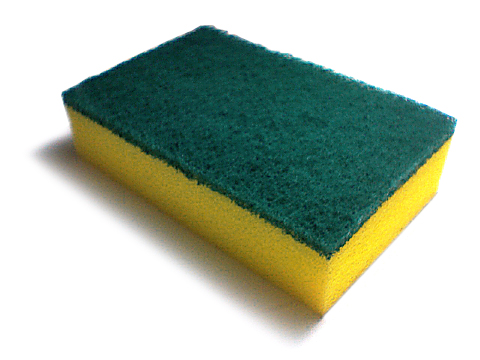
A yellow polyurethane sponge with a green nylon sponge. It is called sponge tawashi in Japan.

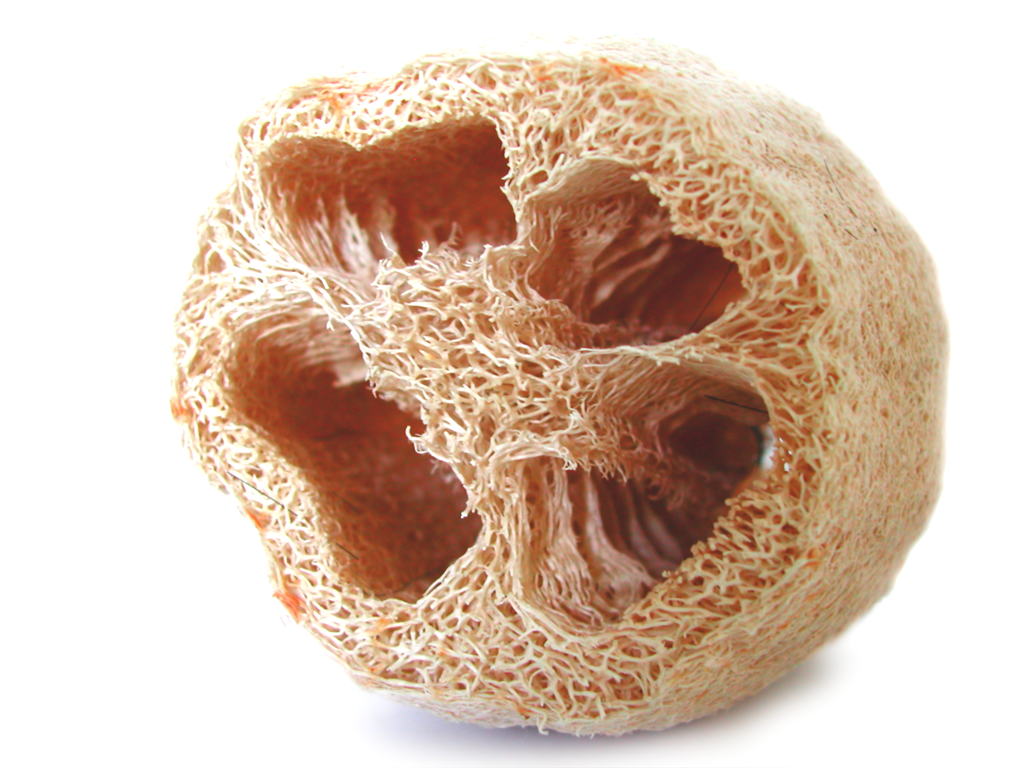
A luffa sponge, called hechima tawashi in Japanese

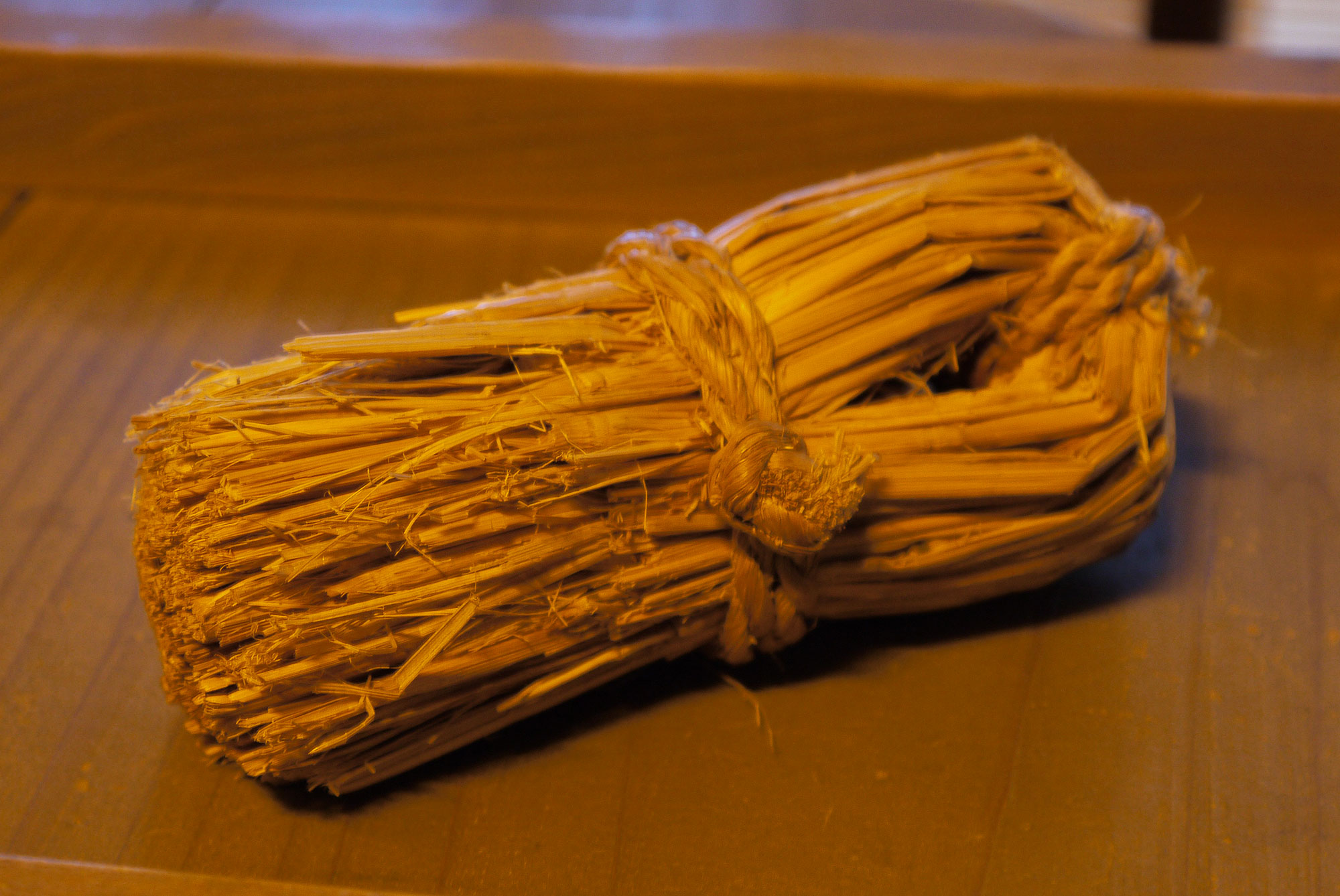
Tawashi from late Edo period

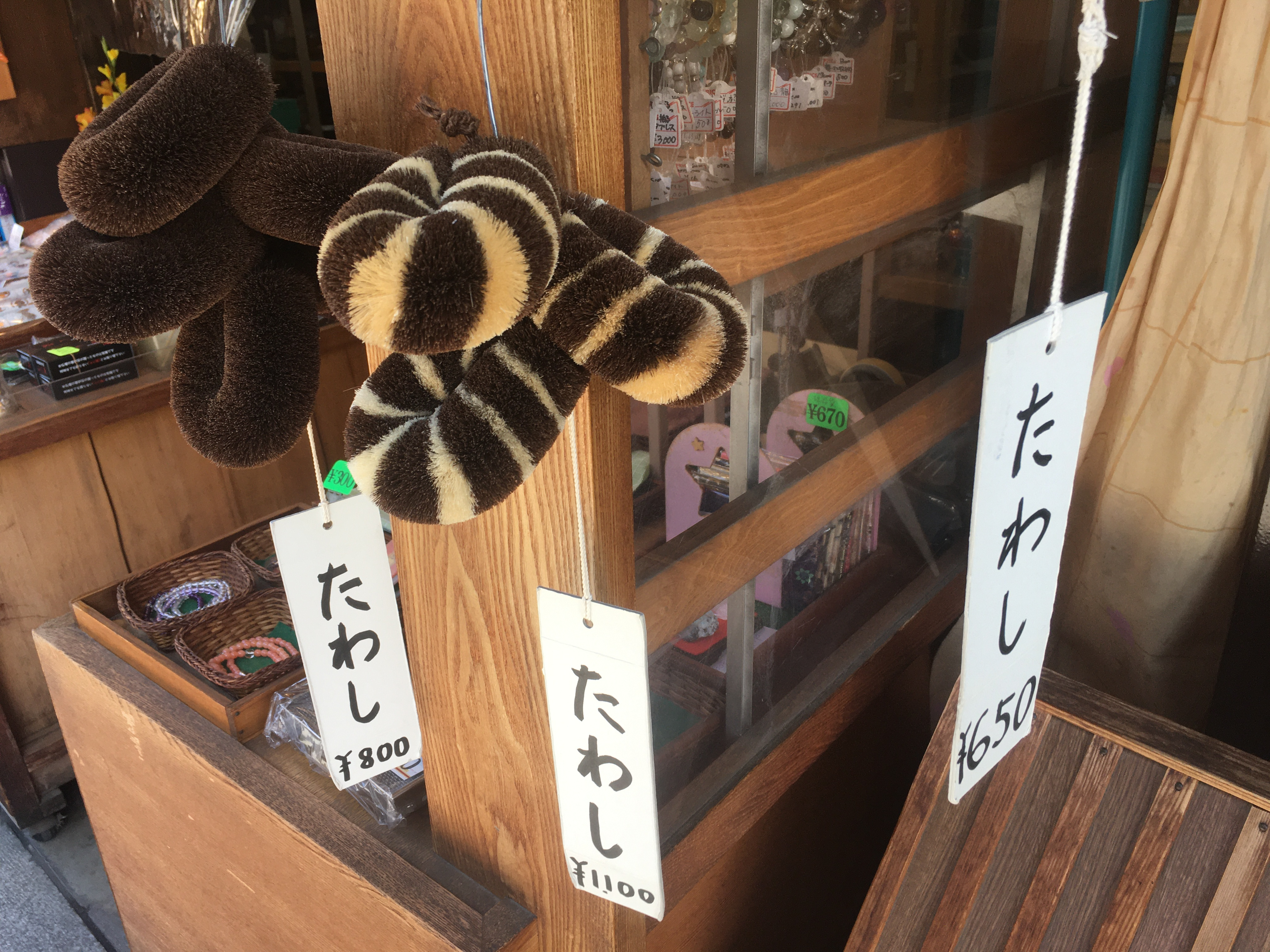
Tawashi for sale

== See also ==
- Sponge (tool)
