= WIN (detergent) =

Brand of laundry detergent

WIN High Performance Sports Detergent is a brand of laundry detergent launched in the United States in 2006 and also sold in Canada. It is designed specifically to clean high performance sports clothing made from microfibers and is marketed towards elite-level athletes and fitness enthusiasts. It is the first officially licensed detergent of the U.S. Olympic Team.

== Technology ==
WIN is a surfactant, and its properties are used in conjunction with WIN's oxygenated system, which is built using hydrogen peroxide bleach (H_{2}O_{2}). The oxidization converts soil and stains into a soluble form that can be washed away by WIN's surfactant system. Hydrogen peroxide also provides a more gentle bleaching action than chlorine bleaches.

Until WIN, peroxide bleach in a liquid detergent had not been marketed primarily to target sweat-caused bacteria in clothing. Oxy-based cleaning systems necessitate a lower pH, which makes them generally less effective on certain household stains like oil or food, and can be difficult to formulate due to stability issues created by a loss of available oxygen over periods of time. However, WIN's cleaning system was designed not to be a general use detergent formula, but rather, to address the needs of its sports enthusiast target market.

== Charity Initiatives ==
In July 2008, WIN teamed up with Olympic decathlete Bryan Clay to announce a new charity initiative called “Take Your Shirts Off to WIN.” The program asks fans to donate workout apparel to WIN, who will wash the clothing and send it to Giving is Winning, an organization that promotes sport activities for the youth in refugee camps throughout the world.
