= Barrier cream =

Skin-protection preparation

A barrier cream is a topical formulation used in industrial applications and as a cosmetic to place a physical barrier between the skin and contaminants that may irritate the skin (contact dermatitis or occupational dermatitis). There are many other terms for creams designed to protect skin from harmful substances, including skin protective creams, pre-work creams, antisolvent gels, protective ointments, and shielding lotions. Three classes of barrier creams are used: water repellent creams, water-soluble creams, and creams designed for special applications. Barrier creams may contain substances such as zinc oxide, talc or kaolin to layer over the skin. For hand care they are designed to protect against the harm from detergents and other irritants.

The efficacy of barrier creams is controversial. They have not been demonstrated to be useful in preventing hand eczema. A 2018 Cochrane review concluded that the use of moisturizers alone or in combination with barrier creams may result in important protective effects for the prevention of Occupational Irritant Hand Dermatitis (OIHD). They are a poor substitute for protective clothing for workers. Gloves provide a greater protection than barrier creams. However they are reasonably effective for the protection of the face against some airborne substances.

Some evidence suggests that improper use of barrier cream could cause a harmful rather than a beneficial effect. Skin that has been moisturized by barrier cream may be more susceptible to irritation by sodium lauryl sulfate, which can permeate hydrated skin more easily because of its hydrophilia. Barrier creams that contain petroleum jelly or certain oils may cause rubber or latex gloves to deteriorate.

== Medical uses ==
=== Hand care ===
For hand care they are designed to protect against the harm from detergents and other irritants. To help prevent the spread of pathogens, health care providers are required to wash their hands frequently. Frequent hand washing can result in chronic damage termed irritant contact dermatitis which includes dryness, irritation, itching, and more seriously, cracking and bleeding. Irritant contact dermatitis is very common among nurses, ranging from 25% to 55%, with as many as 85% relating a history of having skin problems. The World Health Organization has considered the use of barrier creams and has found their efficacy to be "equivocal" and too expensive to be considered in health-care settings where resources are limited.

The Centers for Disease Control and Prevention found "Two recent randomized, controlled trials that evaluated the skin condition of caregivers demonstrated that barrier creams did not yield better results than did the control lotion or vehicle used. As a result, whether barrier creams are effective in preventing irritant contact dermatitis among health-care workers remains unknown."

=== Diaper rash ===
The Great Ormond Street Hospital Manual of Children's Nursing Practices 2012 book found that "disposable nappies are effective in drawing fluid away from the skin and can be changed less frequently in the absence of stools, making regular application of barrier creams unnecessary in most children."

=== Work related ===
Barrier creams have been used in industry to protect workers' skin from the contaminants encountered in occupations such as nurses, hairdressers, employees in the food processing industry, cleaners, metal workers, printers, bricklayers etc.

A 2018 Cochrane review concluded that the use of moisturizers alone or in combination with barrier creams may result in important protective effects for the prevention of Occupational Irritant Hand Dermatitis (OIHD) Barrier creams can be applied before exposure to potential irritants, but are not typically used as the main protection against hazardous substances. They are a poor substitute for protective clothing for workers; in particular, gloves provide greater protection. However barrier creams are reasonably effective for protection of the face against some airborne substances. Active barrier creams containing silicone, tartaric acid, glycerin, and other ingredients are said to be beneficial for some chromate-sensitive construction workers.

=== Effectiveness ===
The efficacy of barrier creams is controversial. They have not been demonstrated to be useful in preventing hand eczema. According to the National Safety Council, "shielding lotions can keep the skin from drying out".

== Safety ==
A 2002 review found "some reports indicate that inappropriate BC (barrier cream) application might induce a deleterious rather than a beneficial effect." Skin that has been moisturized by barrier cream may be more susceptible to irritation by sodium lauryl sulfate, which can permeate hydrated skin more easily due to its hydrophilia. When handling hazardous molecules such as sodium hydroxide, ingredients in barrier cream could react and induce skin irritation. Barrier creams that contain petroleum jelly or certain oils may cause rubber or latex gloves to deteriorate.

== Mechanism of action ==
The mechanism of barrier cream varies by product. Three categories of barrier creams are used: water repellent creams, water-soluble creams, and creams designed for special applications. Moisturizing barrier cream acts as a lubricating film on the skin to prevent depletion of water (transepidermal water loss) in the skin's outermost layer, the stratum corneum. This may have a protective effect against irritant contact dermatitis and allergic contact dermatitis, which often result from such depletion. These barrier creams can be classed as occlusives (which prevent loss through a hydrophobic effect), humectants (which absorb water from the dermis and environment due to hygroscopy), or hydrating agents (which both moisturize the skin and maintain its water content). Barrier creams may contain substances such as zinc oxide, talc or kaolin to layer over the skin. Other barrier creams are intended to protect the skin from some external agents, though they are not sufficient to provide a complete barrier.
