= Didi Seven =

Stain remover

Didi Seven is a stain remover that has been heavily advertised in North America. For many years, it was manufactured and marketed by Interwood, a Canadian company which acquired rights to the product from a German company.

It became well known for its infomercial television marketing campaigns, such as a commercial in which a red sock is turned to white.

== Reviews ==
In 2004, Consumer Reports tested Didi Seven Ultra and found that it performed well in pretreating greasy stains and tannin/sugar stains before washing clothes in the laundry. However, the product failed to completely remove lipstick and ink stains.
