= Lapyrium =

Names
- Preferred IUPAC name 1-(2-{[2-(Dodecanoyloxy)ethyl]amino}-2-oxoethyl)pyridin-1-ium
- Other names Lapirium; 1-({[2-(Dodecanoyloxy)ethyl]carbamoyl}methyl)pyridin-1-ium

Identifiers
CAS Number	109260-82-4; 6272-74-8 (chloride); 1337-59-3 (undecoylium chloride); 1338-54-1 (undecoylium chloride-iodine)
3D model (JSmol)	Interactive image
ChEMBL	ChEMBL1201786
ChemSpider	21241
PubChem CID	22660
UNII	5172AI8LRR; 732T8851QH (chloride); HM7XOI3U8I (undecoylium chloride); O4CEK7FP0D (undecoylium chloride-iodine)
CompTox Dashboard (EPA)	DTXSID50148865
- InChI: InChI=1S/C21H34N2O3/c1-2-3-4-5-6-7-8-9-11-14-21(25)26-18-15-22-20(24)19-23-16-12-10-13-17-23/h10,12-13,16-17H,2-9,11,14-15,18-19H2,1H3/p+1 Key: UGJWZYARKOFRDB-UHFFFAOYSA-O; InChI=1/C21H34N2O3/c1-2-3-4-5-6-7-8-9-11-14-21(25)26-18-15-22-20(24)19-23-16-12-10-13-17-23/h10,12-13,16-17H,2-9,11,14-15,18-19H2,1H3/p+1 Key: UGJWZYARKOFRDB-IKLDFBCSAA
- SMILES: O=C(NCCOC(=O)CCCCCCCCCCC)C[n+]1ccccc1

Properties
Chemical formula	C_{21}H_{35}N_{2}O_{3}
Molar mass	363.522 g·mol^{−1}
Melting point	141 to 144 °C (286 to 291 °F; 414 to 417 K) (chloride)
- Except where otherwise noted, data are given for materials in their standard state (at 25 °C [77 °F], 100 kPa). Infobox references

Lapyrium, or lapirium, as the chloride salt lapirium chloride (INN) or lapyrium chloride (USAN), is a cationic surfactant that is used in personal care products as a biocide and antistatic agent. It is also used in waste-water treatment and corrosion inhibition formulations. It is primarily used as the chloride salt, lapyrium chloride.

== Related disinfectants ==
Undecoylium chloride (Emulsept) is a mixture of closely related chemical compounds, used as a disinfectant, in which lapyrium is the major component. In addition, its complex with iodine, undecoylium chloride-iodine (Virac), is used similarly.
