= Gluma =

Dental desensitizer

Gluma is a brand-name desensitizer, used in dentistry to treat sensitivity, product created by manufacturer Heraeus Kulzer, a German company.

== Use ==
Its formula of 5% glutaraldehyde and 35% HEMA (hydroxy-ethyl methacrylate) in water is used to help control both hypersensitive dentin and reduce the incidence of post-operative sensitivity in restorative dentistry procedures. It’s also useful as a cavity disinfectant, a rewetting agent and an adhesion promoter (when combined with most dentin bonding systems).

Research indicates that when used as a desensitizer under bonded restorative material, Gluma has no significant influence on bond strength, unlike some other liners, which contribute to a decrease in bond strength. In one study, potassium nitrate was more effective at reducing sensitivity.

== Method of action ==
The glutaraldehyde in Gluma works by occluding (blocking) the microscopic tubules that compose dentin, thereby preventing the flow of fluid and decreasing sensitivity.

Glutaraldehyde induces coagulation of proteins in dentinal tubules, which reacts with the serum albumin in the dentinal fluid to cause its precipitation. HEMA forms deep resinous tags and then occludes the dentinal tubules.
