= Comet (cleanser) =

American brand of household cleaning products

- Product type: Household cleaner
- Current owner: KIK Custom Products Inc.
- Country: United States
- Introduced: 1956; 70 years ago
- Previous owners: Procter & Gamble, Prestige Brands
- Website: cometcleaner.com

A canister of Comet cleanser

Comet is an American brand of scouring powders and other household cleaning products manufactured by KIK Custom Products Inc. The brand was introduced in 1956 by Procter & Gamble (P&G) and sold to Prestige Brands in 2001. In 2018, Prestige Brands sold the Comet brand to KIK Custom Products Inc. P&G retained the rights to market the brand in Europe and to the professional market (non-home-consumer) in the United States.

== Ingredients ==
According to the Safety Data Sheets (SDS) published by Procter & Gamble for "PGP Comet Deodorizing Cleanser with Chlorinol" and Prestige Brands for "Comet Powdered Cleanser", Comet cleanser contains 60–100% calcium carbonate (CaCO_{3}).

Ingredients that are common to all Prestige Brands Comet Powdered Cleansers are listed as:

- Calcium carbonate - Scrubbing agent
- Calcium hydroxide - pH adjuster
- Fragrance - Smell
- Green 7 - Colorant (absent in "Comet Lemon Powder")
- Sodium carbonate - Builder/sequestering agent
- Sodium linear alkylbenzenesulfonate surfactant - Cleaning agent
- Trichloro-s-triazinetrione - Bleach
- Trichloroisocyanuric acid (Symclosene) – Disinfectant

The P&G Professional Comet SDS details percentages of the major component chemicals:

- Calcium carbonate: 60-100%
- Sodium carbonate: 7-13%
- Calcium hydroxide: 1-5%
- Sodium dichloro-s triazinetrione dihydrate: 1-5%

(Note: Not all ingredients are listed on an SDS.)

== Warnings ==
Mixing cleaning products containing bleach or other oxygenates (such as Comet) with products that contain ammonia or acid is dangerous. The P&G Comet SDS specifically warns to: "Avoid contact with acids and ammonia."

Despite being labeled as "scratch free", the label for Comet cleanser also advises the use of plenty of water on "delicate surfaces". Comet powdered cleanser is not recommended for use on silver, painted surfaces, walls, soft plastic, aluminum, and rubber.

== Cultural references ==
- In the mid-1960s, former child actor Jane Withers gained new popularity as Josephine the Plumber, a character in a series of television commercials for Comet. The one-minute spots, which ran from 1963 to 1974, involved Withers in up to 30 storylines per year.
- In 1969, Wacky Packages included a mock ad, drafted by Art Spiegelman and painted by Tom Sutton, depicting a flag-waving American Revolutionary soldier and a pair of club-wielding policemen chasing a group of hippies carrying picket signs inscribed "For Freedom!" and "Love! Not War!", with a prominent slogan, "Keep America Clean with Commie Cleanser" and a can, depicting a caricature of Uncle Sam, and inscribed, "Extra Strong Commie Cleanser" and "Gets Rid of Reds, Pinkos, Hippies, Yippies & Flippies". The mock ad has also appeared depicting the can alone.
- A children's song about Comet is sung to the tune of the "Colonel Bogey March". It rhymes "Comet" with "vomit". The complete lyrics are:

Comet, it makes your teeth turn green
Comet, it tastes like gasoline
Comet, it makes you vomit,
So get some Comet, and vomit today!

An alternative version uses different first lines:

Comet, it tastes like Kerosene
Comet, it makes your insides clean

or

Comet, it makes your toilet clean
Comet, it makes your teeth turn green

- The song "Rip Her to Shreds" by the American rock/new wave band Blondie mentions Comet:

She got the nerve to tell me she's not on it
But her expression is too serene
Yeah, she looks like she washes with Comet
Always looking to create a scene

== See also ==
- Ajax scouring cleanser
- Bar Keepers Friend
- Biocide
- Bon Ami scouring cleanser
- Vim
