= Scouring powder =

Household cleaning product

Scouring powder is a household cleaning product consisting of an abrasive powder mixed with a dry soap or detergent, soda, and possibly dry bleach.

Scouring powder is used to clean encrusted deposits on hard surfaces such as ceramic tiles, pots and pans, baking trays, grill, porcelain sinks, bathtubs, toilet bowls and other bathroom fixtures. It is meant to be rubbed over the surface with a little water. The abrasive removes the dirt by mechanical action, and is eventually washed away, together with the powder, by rinsing with water.

Scouring powders are similar to scouring soaps and scouring creams in general composition and mode of action, but differ somewhat in the form (dry powder, instead of a bar or paste) and in the primary intended applications. Scouring powders compete in their intended uses with scouring pads and steel wool.

== Composition ==
A typical scouring powder consists of an insoluble abrasive powder (about 80%), a soluble base (18%) and a detergent (2%). It may also include perfume and/or a dry bleaching agent.

The abrasive can be silica (quartz, SiO_{2}), feldspar (such as orthoclase), pumice, kaolinite, soapstone, talc, calcium carbonate (limestone, chalk), calcite, etc.. The particles should have reasonably uniform size, less than 50 μm in diameter. Hard abrasives like silica and pumice can remove tougher stains but may also scratch glass, metal, and glazed ceramics.

The soluble base is meant to break down fatty substances by saponification; it may be sodium carbonate (lye, washing soda, Na_{2}CO_{3}).

The detergent is usually an anionic surfactant. Its role is to help remove greasy material (such as grease) as an emulsion, and to keep the removed stain particles suspended in the abrasive paste.

The dry bleach is usually a product that releases chlorine (more precisely hypochlorite, the classical household bleaching agent), such as trichloroisocyanuric acid.

The Bar Keepers Friend scouring powder has oxalic acid instead of the base, which makes it effective against rust stains rather than grease and other organic dirt.

== History ==
Abrasive powders have been used to wash off grease and other hard stains since antiquity. Bathing in ancient Greece and Rome started with rubbing the body with fine sand mixed with oil or other substances, and then scraping it off with a special curved spatula, a strigil.

The plants in the genus Equisetum ("horsetails") are also called "scouring rushes" because their microscopic silica scales (phitoliths).

An early industrialized scouring powder was Bon Ami, launched in 1886 by the J.T. Robertson Soap Company as a gentler alternative to quartz-based scouring powders then available on store shelves.

Another early commercial brand was Vim (1904), one of the first products created by William Lever. The abrasive was obtained from sandstone mined at the Cambrian Quarry at Gwernymynydd between 1905 and about 1950. The brand is still marketed in some countries, but Unilever has been replacing it with Jif and then Cif.

Scouring powders have been marketed with many other companies and brand names, such as Ajax, Bon Ami, Radium, Comet, Sano, and Zud.
