= Copper(II) cyanurate =

Copper(II) Cyanurate
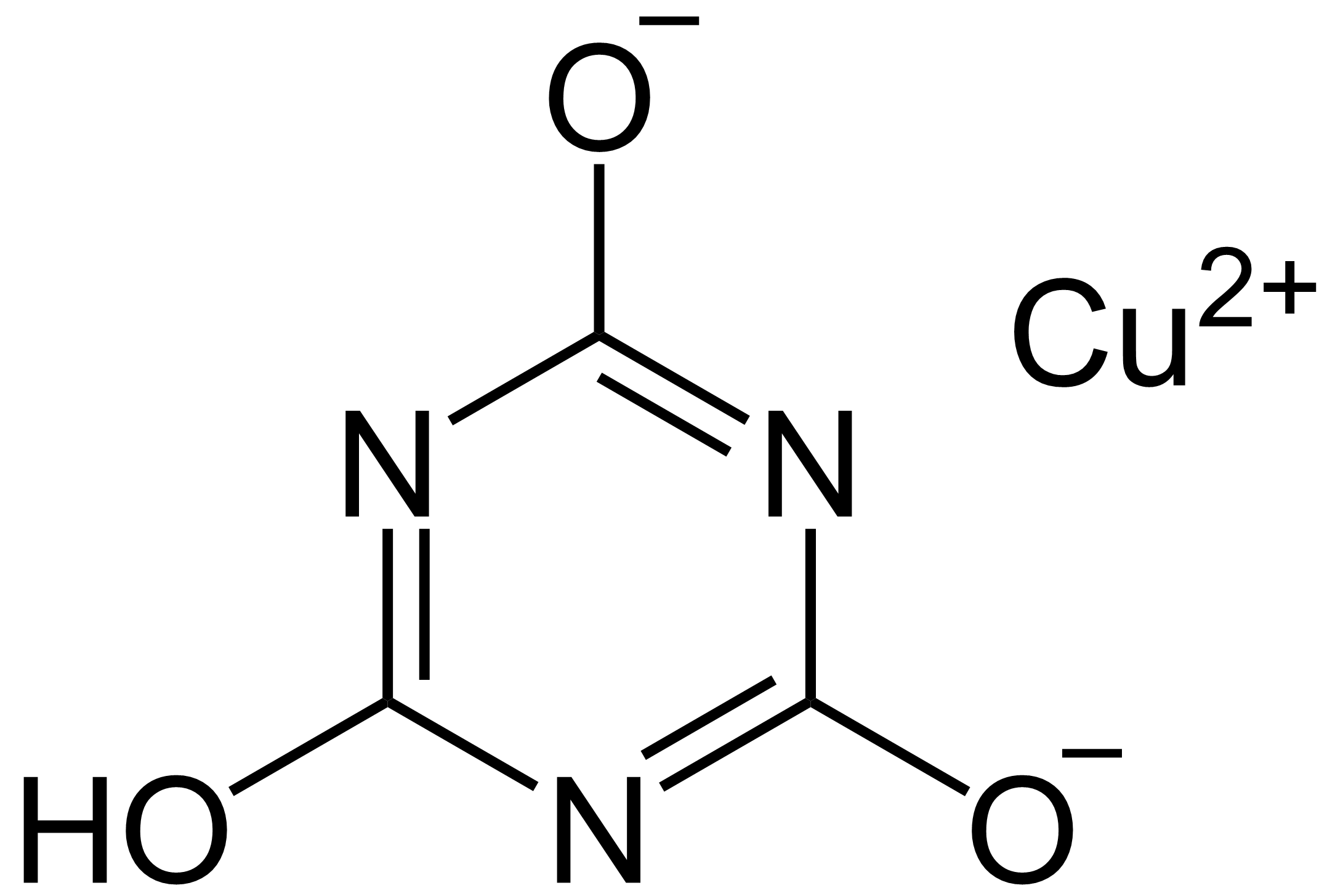

Names
- IUPAC name Copper 6-hydroxy-1,3,5-triazine-2,4-bis(olate)
- Other names Copper 1,3,5-triazine-2,4,6-triol

Identifiers
3D model (JSmol)	Interactive image
PubChem CID	137177301
- InChI: InChI=1S/C3H3N3O3.Cu/c7-1-4-2(8)6-3(9)5-1;/h(H3,4,5,6,7,8,9);/q;+2/p-2 Key: IXMUUTDLXYTMPF-UHFFFAOYSA-L
- SMILES: [Cu+2].[O-]c1nc(O)nc([O-])n1

Properties
Chemical formula	C3HCuN3O3
Molar mass	190.60434
Appearance	purple powder
- Except where otherwise noted, data are given for materials in their standard state (at 25 °C [77 °F], 100 kPa). Infobox references

Copper(II) cyanurate is an organic compound with the chemical formula C_{3}HCuN_{3}O_{3}. It exists as a stable purple solid. It has few uses, being more often encountered accidentally, rather than intentionally synthesised. Several other copper(II) cyanurate complexes exist, some of which occur naturally as minerals.

== Occurrence ==
Copper(II) cyanurate is often formed when the copper concentration in an outdoor swimming pool is too high. The copper ions in solution react with cyanuric acid (which is added as a chlorine stabilizer) to produce copper(II) cyanurate. This phenomenon is called 'Purple Cyanurate', as it discolours the water and surfaces in the pool to a purple shade. The same can occur when other pool chlorine sources such as NaDCC or TCCA are added.

Joanneumite is a rare natural mineral found in bat guano with formula Cu(C_{3}N_{3}O_{3}H_{2})_{2}(NH_{3})_{2}.

== Synthesis ==
Copper(II) cyanurate can be prepared by reacting cyanuric acid with copper(II) oxide.

CuO + C_{3}H_{3}N_{3}O_{3} → C_{3}HCuN_{3}O_{3} + H_{2}O.

=== Other complexes ===
Copper(II) cyanurate is known to form several ammine complexes. Chlorinated derivatives of cyanuric acid commonly known as dichlor or trichlor also form similar complexes. In addition, a complex with fully deprotonated cyanurate ligands exists.

==== Diamminebis(cyanurate)copper(II) ====
A lavender-pink complex with the formula Cu(NH_{3})_{2}(C_{3}N_{3}O_{3})_{2} can be prepared by heating copper(II) compounds, such as copper(II) nitrate or basic copper carbonate, with molten urea up to 190°C.

6 CO(NH_{2})_{2} → 2 C_{3}H_{3}N_{3}O_{3} + 6 NH_{3}

2 C_{3}H_{3}N_{3}O_{3} + 2 NH_{3} + CuO → Cu(NH_{3})_{2}(C_{3}N_{3}O_{3})_{2} + H_{2}O

This is dissolved and then recrystallised from a hot strong ammonia solution.

If instead a weak (2%) cold ammonia solution is used, a dark purple compound is formed. This compound's formula is not specified, but infrared data and magnetic dipole measurements suggest there are no Cu-Cu bonds.

==== Sodium tetrakis(dichloroisocyanurate)copper(II) ====
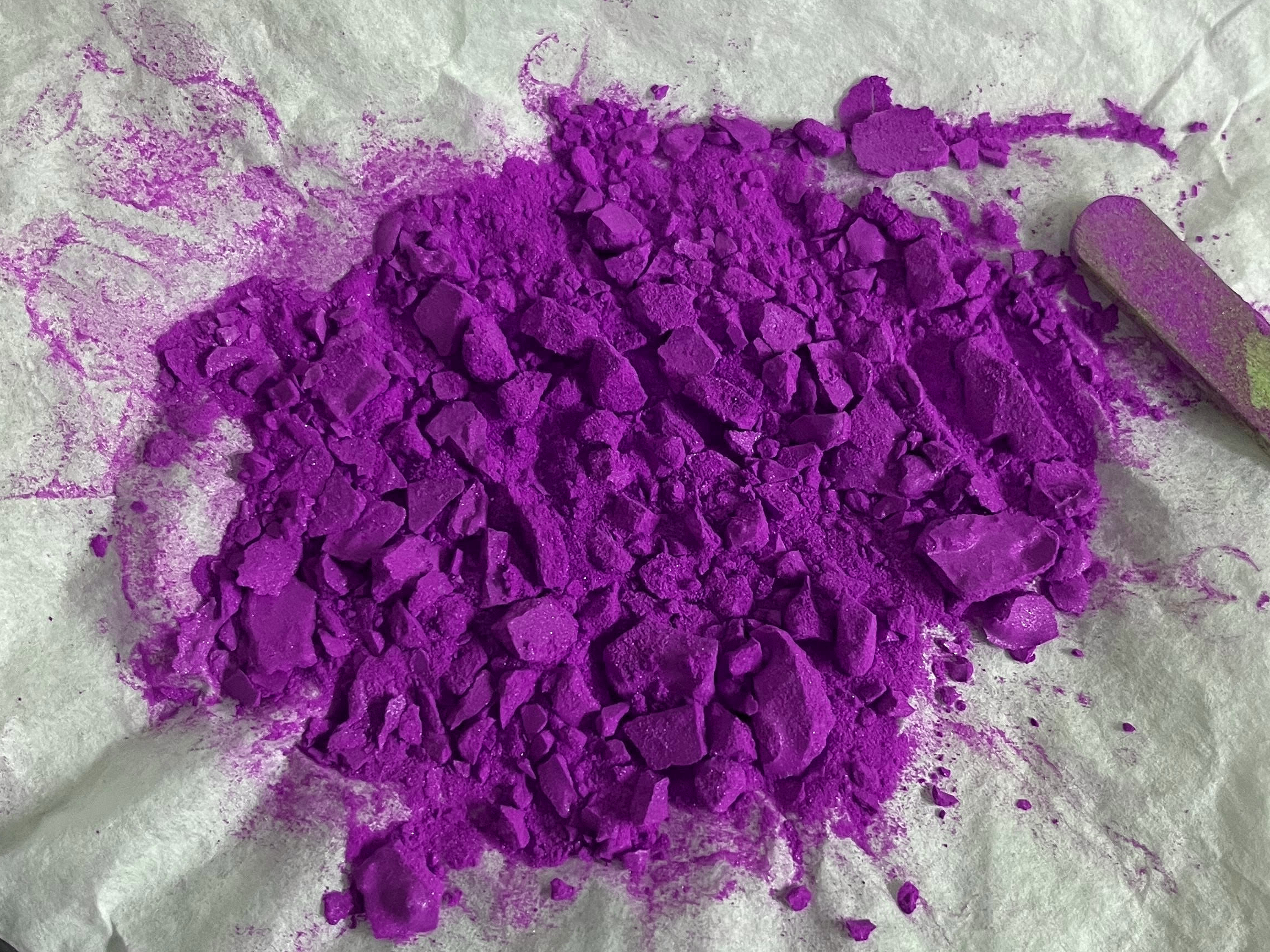
Slightly damp Na_{2}[Cu(C_{3}N_{3}O_{3}Cl_{2})_{4}]

A lilac complex with the formula Na_{2}[Cu(C_{3}N_{3}O_{3}Cl_{2})_{4}] can be prepared by reacting sodium dichloroisocyanurate (NaDCC) with copper(II) compounds such as copper(II) sulfate.

CuSO_{4} + 4 Na(C_{3}N_{3}O_{3}Cl_{2}) → Na_{2}[Cu(C_{3}N_{3}O_{3}Cl_{2})_{4}] + Na_{2}SO_{4}

==== Neutral copper(II) cyanurate ====
A green-coloured neutral copper(II) cyanurate complex with the formula Cu_{3}(C_{3}N_{3}O_{3})_{2} also exists. It contains no water or ammonia ligands, with the cyanurate ligands fully deprotonated.

== Applications ==
Copper(II) cyanurate has no known practical uses.
