= Ajax (cleaning product) =

Brand of cleaning products

- Type: Cleaning agent
- Inception: 1947; 79 years ago
- Manufacturer: Colgate-Palmolive
- Available: Yes

Ajax is an American brand of household cleaning products and detergents made by Colgate-Palmolive

== History ==
Container of Ajax powder from Mexico; bicloro means "double bleach"

Colgate-Palmolive introduced Ajax Powdered Cleanser in 1947 as one of the company's first major brands. Its ingredients include sodium dodecylbenzenesulfonate, sodium carbonate, and quartz.

The Ajax brand was extended to a line of household cleaning products and detergents, which enjoyed its greatest success in the 1960s and beginning of the 1970s. Ajax All Purpose Cleaner with Ammonia, introduced in 1962, was the first major competitor to Procter and Gamble's Mr. Clean (debuted 1958). Ajax's success as the so called "White Tornado" forced Procter and Gamble to introduce its own ammoniated cleaner, Top Job, in 1963.

Other products by Ajax included Ajax Bucket of Power, an ammoniated power floor cleaner (1963); Ajax Laundry Detergent (1964); and Ajax Window Cleaner with Hex ammonia (1965). The last successful Ajax line extension in North America, Ajax for Dishes (now known as Ajax Dishwashing Liquid) debuted in 1971.

Currently, Ajax Powdered Cleanser and Ajax Dishwashing Liquid are the only two Ajax products sold by Colgate-Palmolive in the United States. In 2005, Colgate-Palmolive licensed the American and Canadian rights to the Ajax brand name for laundry detergent products. In the same transaction, Colgate-Palmolive also sold its American, Canadian and Puerto Rican laundry products business to Phoenix Brands in 2005.

Awesome Products Inc. acquired the rights to the Ajax laundry products line in November 2023.

== Advertising and popular culture ==
The slogan for the original Ajax laundry detergent was "Stronger than dirt!", trademarked by Colgate-Palmolive Company. This slogan was often advertised with a knight in armor riding a white horse. The "Stronger Than Dirt!" phrase appears towards the end of the song "Touch Me" by the Doors, reflecting its popularity at the time.

Additionally, the USPTO shows that Colgate-Palmolive Company also held a trademark for "Stronger than grease" until 2023. While Ajax's products are labeled with "Stronger than dirt" as listed on their website, a Greek City Times story referenced a viral social media post that suggested "Stronger than grease" was a pun referencing the Greek mythological hero Ajax, though Colgate-Palmolive never confirmed this interpretation. Colgate ceased advertising in the United Kingdom for the brand in January 1996.

American actor Eugene Roche gained fame as Ajax man "Squeaky Clean" in many television commercials of the 1970s.

In the United Kingdom, character actress Ann Lancaster appeared on television advertisements featuring the slogan "It cleans like a white tornado".

In 1977, Steptoe and Son actors Wilfrid Brambell and Harry H. Corbett appeared in two television advertisements for Ajax, recorded during their tour of Australia.

In the Philippines, actress Lorli Villanueva appeared in television commercials, featuring her character as "Maxima Labandera" in the 1970s. Lito Lapid, Jimmy Santos, Nida Blanca also starred in various Ajax detergent commercials from 1988 to 1992. Blanca's frequent co-star Dolphy was the final brand ambassador of Ajax detergent from 1994 until the product's discontinuation in 2000.

In Australia, Ajax Spray n' Wipe television commercials appeared from 1988 to 2010, all voiced by Robyn Moore singing a jingle to the tune of Ian Dury's song "Billericay Dickie". The ads featured soap opera actress Paula Duncan.

== See also ==
- Biocide
- Bon Ami cleanser
- Comet cleanser
- Vim cleanser
- Ajax the Great
