= Lestoil =

Oil-based cleaning product

- Product type: Heavy-duty multipurpose cleanser
- Current owner: The Clorox Company
- Country: United States
- Introduced: 1933
- Previous owners: Procter & Gamble, Noxell, Adell Chemical Company
- Website: clorox.com/lestoil

Lestoil is a registered trade name of Clorox for a heavy-duty multipurpose cleanser product, used to remove extremely difficult laundry stains, dissolve water-based and oil-based paints, and clean grease, oil, paint, and adhesives from floors and surfaces. It was introduced as a dry cleaning fluid for laundry in 1933. As a company, Lestoil, also known as the Adell Chemical Company, also made Bon Ami, from 1964 until 1971.

== Formula ==
As of 2015, the safety data sheet for Lestoil lists tall oil fatty acids, sodium salts 5–10%, Stoddard solvent 3–7%, pine oil 1–5%, sodium hydroxide < 1%.

== History ==
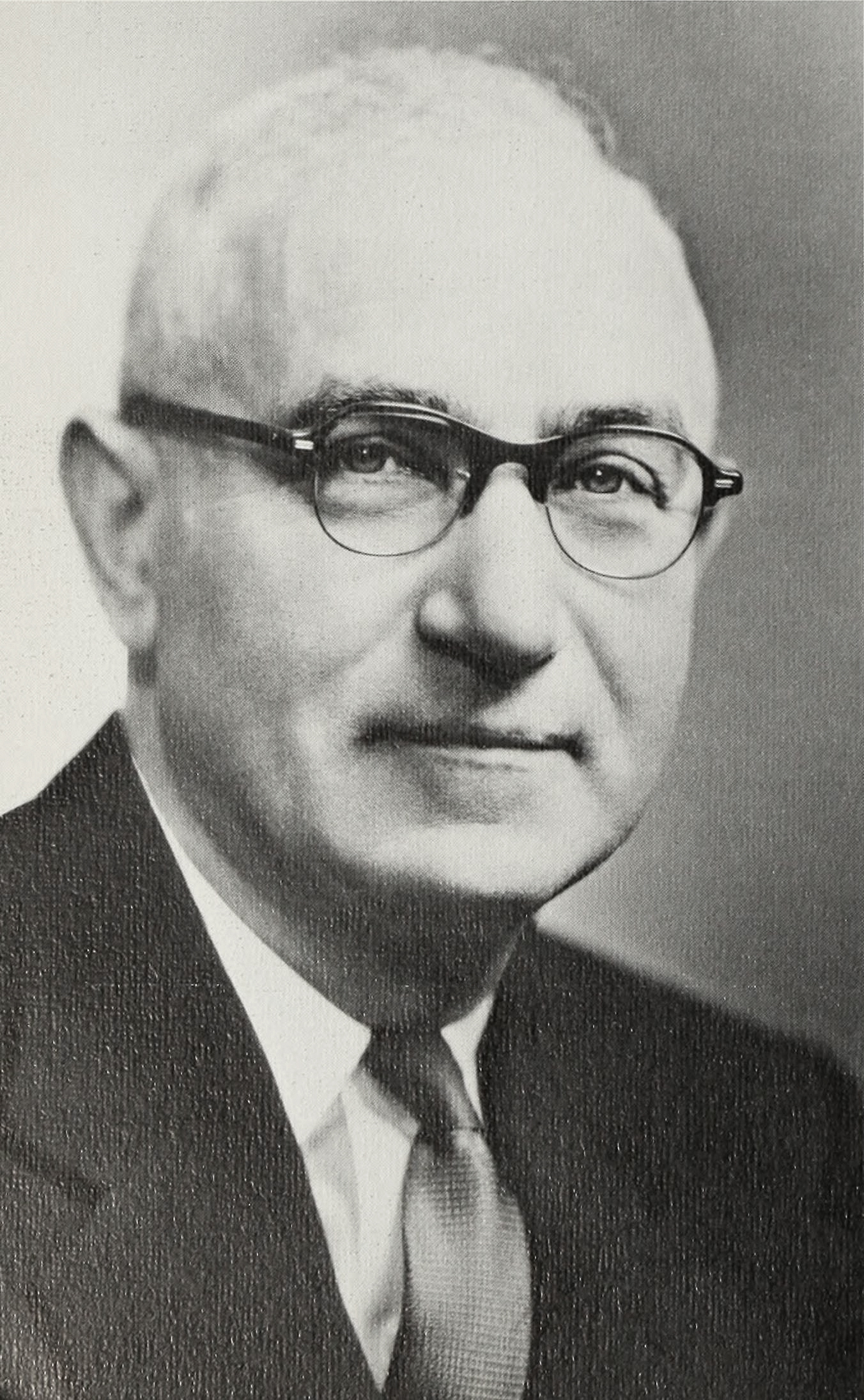
Jacob L. Barowsky, creator of Lestoil

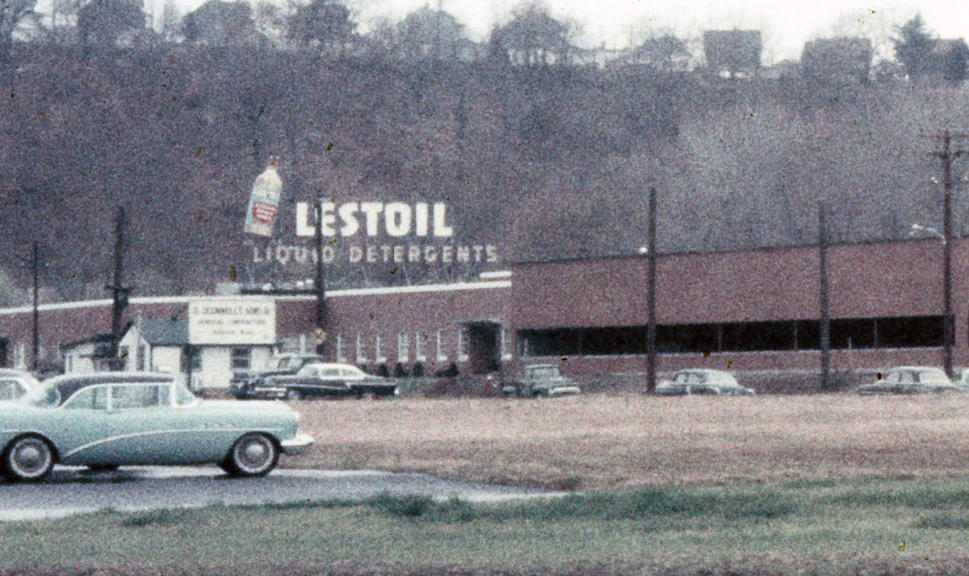
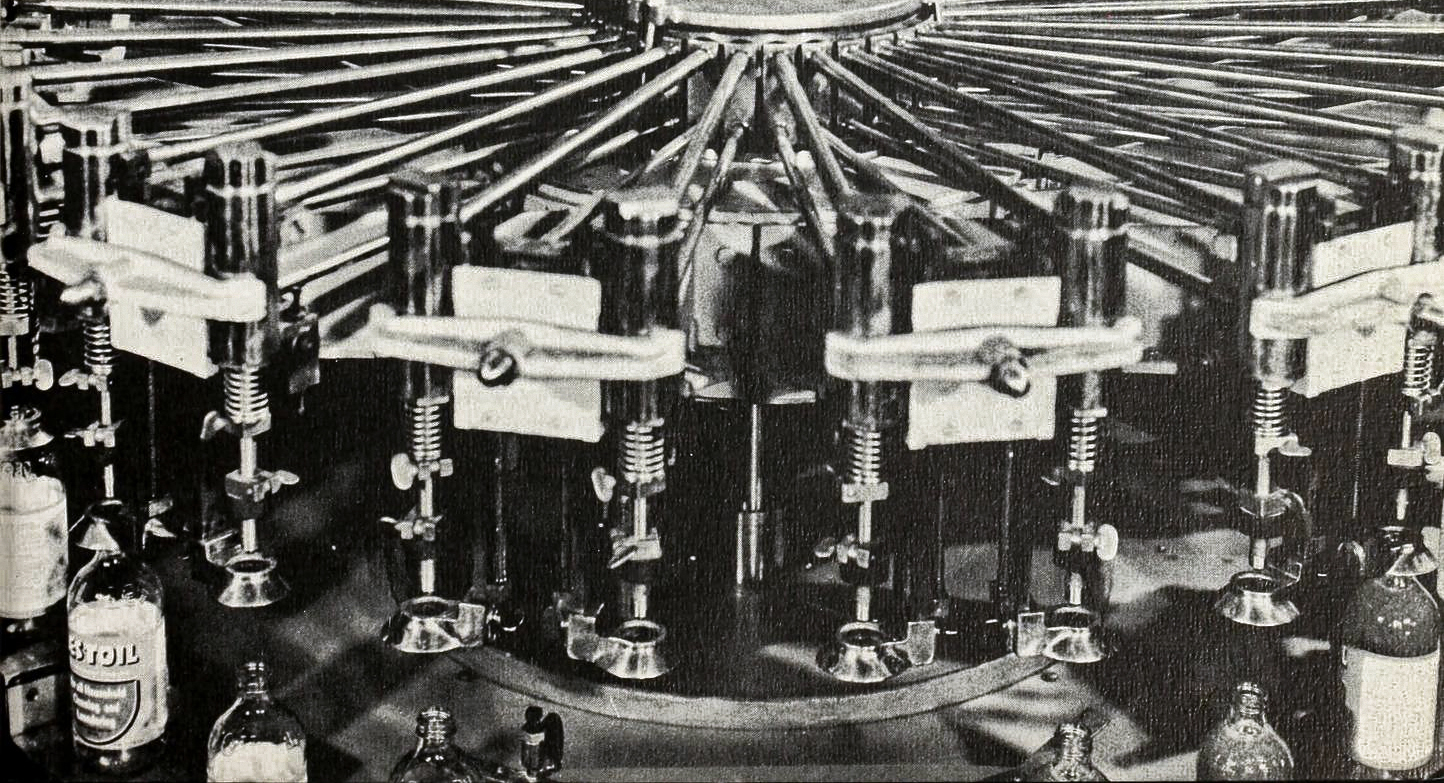
The headquarters of the Adell Chemical Company in Springdale, Holyoke, Massachusetts, c. 1955; a bottling machine filling bottles of Lestoil

Harvard graduate Jacob L. Barowsky worked at the General Cleaners and Dyers in Holyoke, Massachusetts. In 1927 he saw the need for a single product that removed both water-soluble and non-water-soluble soils from laundry. Barowsky started the Adell Chemical Company to solve the problem, and with the assistance of chemist John Tulenko, they introduced LAVOL to the world in 1933 (renamed to LesToil in 1936).

Initially, LesToil was used by commercial laundries, but it was also used to remove ink, wax, oil, grease and adhesives by paper mills during production. After 11 years of pressure to enter the retail market, Barowsky started using industrial profits to fund marketing efforts. Much of his early success was also attributed to an agreement with Steiger's Department Store, which sold the product and allowed him to perform demonstrations. Among other marketing promotions that Barowsky would use, included promotional bottles featuring the likenesses of historical figures like George Washington, the inclusion of dolls with the product, such as a series representing different countries, and the publishing of a book "Lestoil Animal Stories" which prominently featured its product, as well as a washable cover. The amount of time and money he put into local marketing however proved time-consuming and it would not be until the 1950s, when Barowsky saturated the market with TV commercials, that he succeeded in making Lestoil a household name. The product was now used in 80% of the homes in which it was made available. For some duration in the late 1950s, the Adell Chemical Company would also promote a powdered bleach product, dubbed "Lestare". In 1963 the company acquired a 60% share of Bon Ami, and from 1964 until 1971 owned the product in full. After its merger with the Bon Ami Company in 1964, Adell began producing their product line out of the former Skinner's Silk mill, before eventually selling the brand to Faultless Starch in 1971.

Barowsky sold the company in 1960 for $12 million to Standard International Corp. They sold it to the Noxell Company in 1969, which became a subsidiary of Procter & Gamble Company in 1989.

On June 21, 1996, Noxell sold the Lestoil cleaner brand to Clorox Company, so that Noxell could focus on its Max Factor and CoverGirl lines. Noxell claimed that 99% of their business had become cosmetics and fragrances and that cleaners had no strategic fit in their company.

As of 2014, regional marketing has left brand recognition of Lestoil to primarily a midwest/east coast American and Puerto Rican audience. As such, large distributors like Walmart only stock it in regions where it was advertised.

=== Lestoil syndrome ===
In product marketing, the name Lestoil became synonymous by the early 1960s with a phenomenon of corporate copycat practices, known as the "Lestoil syndrome", coined by journalist and management consultant Robert Heller. Essentially "Lestoil syndrome" describes the phenomena of innovators being copied by competitors with greater capital resources, who can employ the initial creator's strategy, but use their capital to obtain a greater market recognition. The Lestoil detergent product was among the earliest heavy-industry cleaning detergents marketed directly to consumers; however, its initial success in obtaining a large market share was quickly overshadowed when larger competitors in the household product space took notice. These competitors began introducing similarly marketed products like Colgate-Palmolive's liquid Ajax, and Procter & Gamble's Mr. Clean, and before eventually being bought by a subsidiary of Procter & Gamble, their marketing campaigns diluted Lestoil's market share. Heller characterized this by saying they had "reacted with multi-million dollar force, swamping Lestoil in a sea of green bubbles".
