= Bombril =

Brazilian manufacturer of cleaning products

- Industry: Household goods
- Founded: January 14, 1948; 78 years ago in São Paulo, Brazil
- Founder: Roberto Sampaio Ferreira
- Products: Steel wool, detergent, scouring powder
- Website: bombril.com.br

Bombril is a Brazilian manufacturer of household cleaning agents. Their main product is a fine-grade steel wool marketed with the brand "Bom Bril". The company at one point had 90% share of the Brazilian market for that product, and the brand name is, to this day, used in the country as a metonymy to steel wool in general, although the company manufactures other products as well.

The company was created on 1948-01-14 at the Brooklin Paulista borough of São Paulo, by entrepreneur Roberto Sampaio Ferreira, with the name Abrasivos Bombril Ltda. The name was a contraction and shortening of the Portuguese words bom brilho, meaning "good shine".

Besides the Bom Bril steel wool, the company markets several other products such as the "Limpol" brand of dishwashing detergent, the "Pinho Bril" scented disinfectant detergents, and the "Radium" scouring powder.
