= Spotless =

Spotless may refer to:

- Spotless (Australian business), an Australian integrated services company providing cleaning, catering, laundry services, facilities management
- Spotless Group, pan-European manufacturer of insect control and laundry products
- Spotless (TV series), a Franco - British television series
- "Spotless" (Doctors), a 2004 television episode
