= BKF =

BKF may refer to:

- Bar Keepers Friend, a cleaning product
- the BKF file format, used in the NTBackup command
- Budapest College of Communication and Business (Hungarian: Budapesti Kommunikációs és Üzleti Főiskola, BKF), a higher education institute in Hungary
- Burkina Faso, UNDP country code
- Butterfly chair
