= C18H37NO2 =

The molecular formula C_{18}H_{37}NO_{2} (molar mass: 299.49 g/mol, exact mass: 299.2824 u) may refer to:

- Ammonium oleate
- Palmitoylethanolamide (PEA)
- Sphingosine
