= Cleaning agent =

Substance used to remove dirt or other contaminants

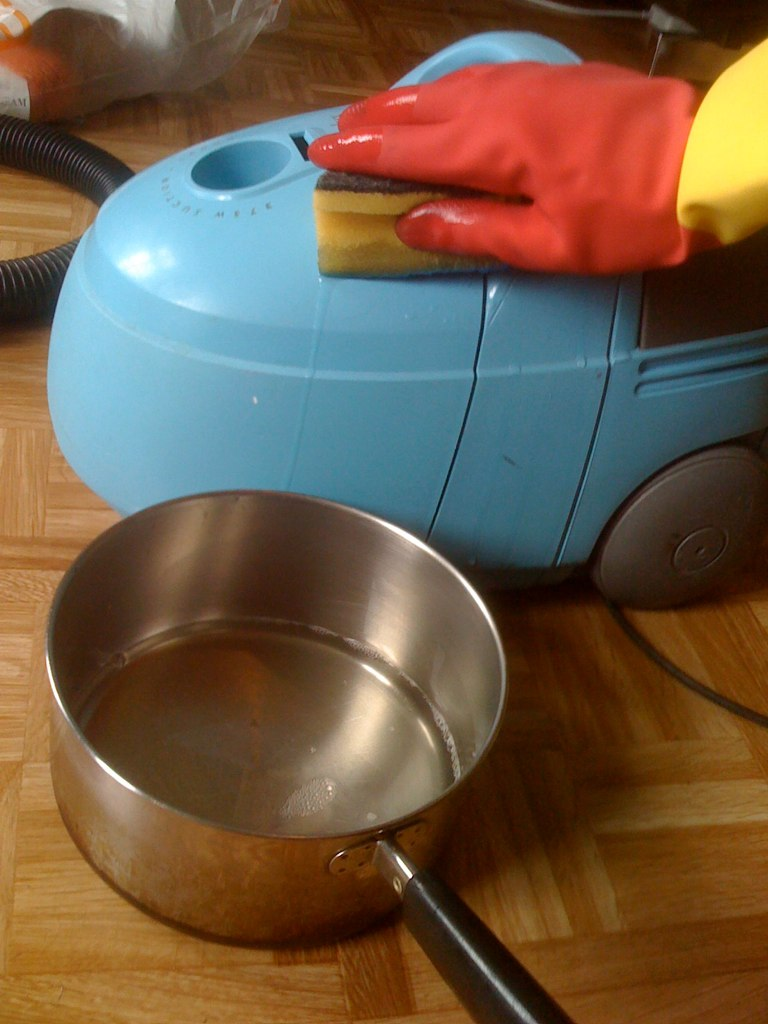
Using a mix of acidic vinegar and soap to clean a plastic surface

Cleaning agents or hard-surface cleaners are substances (usually liquids, powders, sprays, or granules) used to remove dirt, including dust, stains, foul odors, and clutter on surfaces. Purposes of cleaning agents include health, beauty, removing offensive odors, and avoiding the spread of dirt and contaminants to oneself and others. Some cleaning agents can kill bacteria (e.g. door handle bacteria, as well as bacteria on worktops and other metallic surfaces) and clean at the same time. Others, called degreasers, contain organic solvents to help dissolve oils and fats.

== Chemical agents ==
=== Acidic ===
Acidic cleaning agents are mainly used for removal of deposits like scaling. The active ingredients are normally strong mineral acids and chelants. Often, surfactants and corrosion inhibitors are added to the acid.

Hydrochloric acid is a common mineral acid typically used for concrete. Vinegar can also be used to clean hard surfaces and remove calcium deposits. Sulphuric acid is used in acidic drain cleaners to unblock clogged pipes by dissolving organic materials, like greases, proteins, and even carbohydrate-containing substances such as toilet tissue.

=== Alkaline ===
Alkaline cleaning agents contain strong bases like sodium hydroxide or potassium hydroxide. Such agents are effective against animal or vegetable fats through conversion into soaps, therefore have poor effectiveness for oils that can not be saponified.

Bleach (pH 12) and ammonia (pH 11) are common alkaline cleaning agents. Often, dispersants, to prevent redeposition of dissolved dirt, and chelants, to attack rust, are added to the alkaline agent.

Alkaline cleaners can dissolve fats (including grease), oils, and protein-based substances.

=== Neutral ===
Neutral washing agents are pH-neutral and based on non-ionic surfactants that disperse different types.

== Scouring agents ==
Scouring agents are mixtures of the usual cleaning chemicals (surfactants, water softeners) as well as abrasive powders. The abrasive powder must be of a uniform particle size.

Particles are usually smaller than 0.05 mm. Pumice, calcium carbonate (limestone, chalk, dolomite), kaolinite, quartz, soapstone or talc are often used as abrasives, i.e. polishing agents.

Special bleaching powders contain compounds that release sodium hypochlorite, the classical household bleaching agent. These precursor agents include trichloroisocyanuric acid and mixtures of sodium hypochlorite ("chlorinated orthophosphate").

Examples of notable products include Ajax, Bar Keepers Friend, Bon Ami, Comet, Vim, Zud, and others.

== Purposes ==
=== Oven cleaners ===
Traditional oven cleaners contain sodium hydroxide (lye), solvents, and other ingredients. They work best when used in a slightly warm (not hot) oven. If used in a self-cleaning oven, the lye can cause permanent damage to the oven.

Some oven cleaners are based on ingredients other than lye. These products must be used in a cold oven. Most new-style oven cleaners can be used in self-cleaning ovens.

=== All-purpose cleaners ===
All-purpose cleansers contain mixtures of anionic and nonionic surfactants, polymeric phosphates or other sequestering agents, solvents, hydrotropic substances, polymeric compounds, corrosion inhibitors, skin-protective agents, and sometimes perfumes and colorants. Aversive agents, such as denatonium, are occasionally added to cleaning products to discourage animals and small children from consuming them.

Some cleaners contain water-soluble organic solvents like glycol ethers and fatty alcohols, which ease the removal of oil, fat and paint. Disinfectant additives include quaternary ammonium compounds, phenol derivatives, terpene alcohols (pine oil), aldehydes, and aldehyde-amine condensation products.

All-purpose cleaners are usually concentrated solutions of surfactants and water softeners, which enhance the behavior of surfactant in hard water. Typical surfactants are alkylbenzene sulfonates, an anionic detergent, and modified fatty alcohols. A typical water softener is sodium triphosphate.

All-purpose cleansers are effective with most common kinds of dirt. Their dilute solutions are neutral or weakly alkaline, and are safe for use on most surfaces.

=== Toilet cleaners / hygiene / deodorant products ===
Toilet bowl cleaning is often aimed at the removal of calcium carbonate deposits, which are attacked by acids. Powdered cleaners contain acids that come in the form of solid salts, such as sodium hydrogen sulfate. Liquid toilet bowl cleaners contain other acids, typically dilute hydrochloric, phosphoric, or formic acids. These convert the calcium carbonate into salts that are soluble in water or are easily rinsed away.

=== Metal cleaners ===
Metal cleaners are used for cleaning stainless steel sinks, faucets, metal trim, silverware, etc. These products contain abrasives (e.g., siliceous chalk, diatomaceous earth, alumina) with a particle size < 20 μm. Fatty alcohol or alkylphenol polyglycol ethers with 7-12 ethylene oxide (EO) units are used as surfactants.

For ferrous metals, the cleaners contain chelating agents, abrasives, and surfactants. These agents include citric and phosphoric acids, which are nonaggressive. Surfactants are usually modified fatty alcohols. Silver cleaning is a specialty since silver is noble but tends to tarnish via formation of black silver sulfide, which is removable via silver-specific complexants such as thiourea, and either hydrochloric or sulfuric acid.

Stainless steel, nickel, and chromium cleaners contain lactic, citric, or phosphoric acid. A solvent (mineral spirits) may be added.

Nonferrous metal cleaners contain ammonia, ammonium soaps (ammonium oleate, stearate) and chelating agents (ammonium citrate, oxalate).

=== Glass cleaners ===
Light duty hard surface cleaners are not intended to handle heavy dirt and grease. Because these products are expected to clean without rinsing and result in a streak-free shine, they contain no salts. Typical window cleaning items consist of alcohols, either ethanol or isopropanol like Windex, and surfactants for dissolving grease. Other components include small amounts of ammonia as well as dyes and perfumes.

These are composed of organic, water-miscible solvent such as isopropyl alcohol and an alkaline detergent. Some glass cleaners also contain a fine, mild abrasive. Most glass cleaners are available as sprays or liquid. They are sprayed directly onto windows, mirrors and other glass surfaces or applied on with a soft cloth and rubbed off using a soft, lint-free duster. A glass cloth and soft water, to which some methylated spirit or vinegar is added, is an inexpensive alternative to store-bought glass cleaner.

=== Building facade cleaners ===
For acid-resistant building facades, such as brick, acids are typically used. These include mixtures of phosphoric and hydrofluoric acid as well as surfactants. For acid-sensitive facades such as concrete, strongly alkaline cleaners are used such as sodium hydroxide and thickeners. Both types of cleaners require a rinsing and often special care since the solutions are aggressive toward skin.

== Common cleaning agents ==
- Acetic acid (vinegar)
- Various forms of alcohol including isopropyl alcohol or rubbing alcohol
- Ammonia solution
- Bleach
- Borax
- Carbon dioxide
- Citric acid
- Freon (e.g. dichlorodifluoromethane) (use is often discouraged due to damaging effects on the ozone layer)
- Soap or detergent
- Sodium carbonate (washing soda)
- Sodium bicarbonate (baking soda)
- Sodium hydroxide (lye)
- Sodium hypochlorite (liquid bleach)
- Sodium perborate
- Sodium percarbonate
- Tetrachloroethylene (dry cleaning)
- Trisodium phosphate
- Water, the most common cleaning agent, which is a very powerful polar solvent
- Xylene (can damage plastics)

== See also ==
- Disinfectant
- Green cleaning
- Laundry detergents
- List of cleaning products
