= SDIC =

SDIC may refer to the following:

- San Domingo Improvement Company, an entity formed to assume control of Dominican Republic railroads in its colonial period; see History of the Dominican Republic § Ulises Heureaux and U.S. protectorate
- In mathematics, Sensitive dependency on initial conditions, also called the butterfly effect
- Singapore Deposit Insurance Corporation, see Deposit insurance § Singapore
- Sodium dichloroisocyanurate
- South Dakota Intercollegiate Conference, a former athletic conference affiliated in the National Association of Intercollegiate Athletics (NAIA)
- Spatial Data Interest Community, or Spatial Data Infrastructure Community, a community with interests in spatial data as defined by INSPIRE
- State Development & Investment Corporation, a state-owned investment holding company in China
