= Dichloroisocyanuric acid =

Dichlor
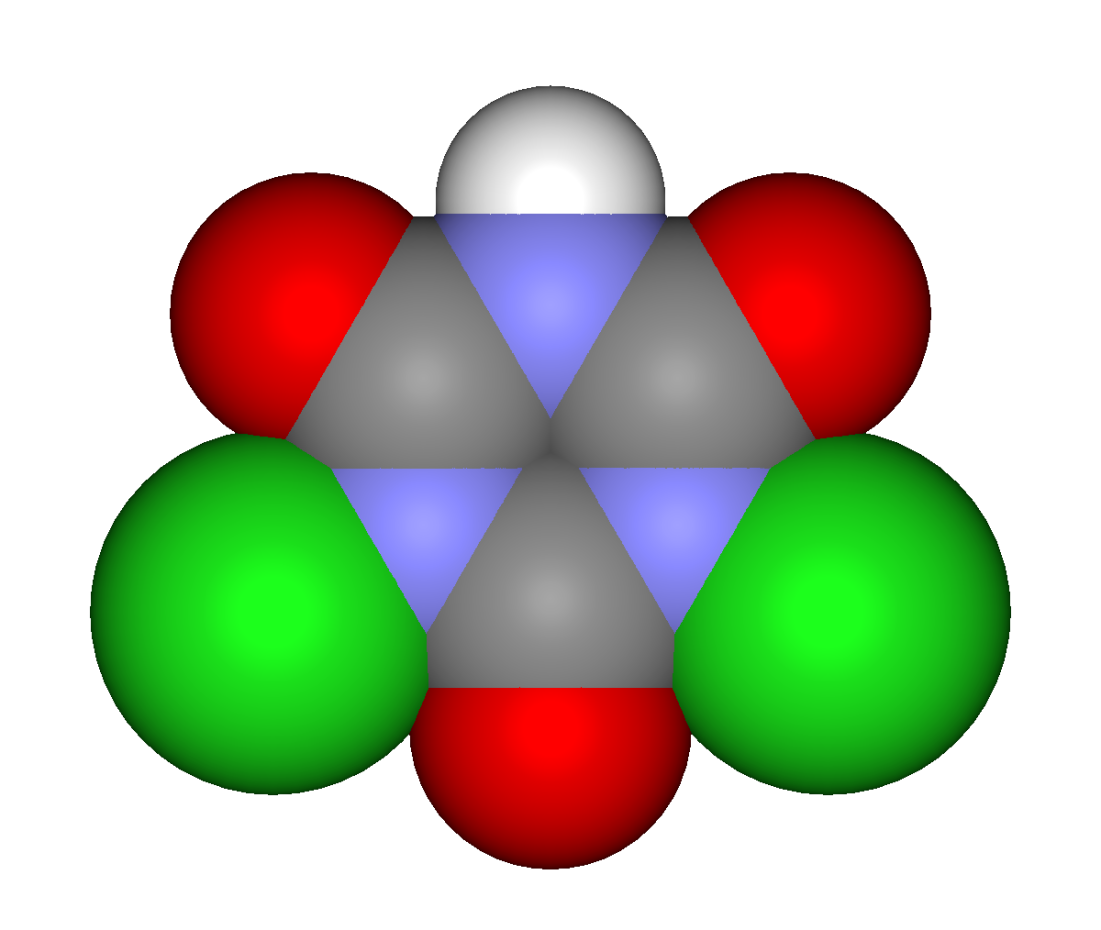
Dichlor

Names
- Preferred IUPAC name 1,3-Dichloro-1,3,5-triazinane-2,4,6-trione

Identifiers
| CAS Number | 2782-57-2 |
| 3D model (JSmol) | Interactive image; Interactive image |
| ChemSpider | 15857 |
| ECHA InfoCard | 100.018.625 |
| KEGG | D08650 |
| PubChem CID | 16726 |
| UNII | PHR838Y52L |
| CompTox Dashboard (EPA) | DTXSID8024993 |
- InChI: InChI=1S/C3HCl2N3O3/c4-7-1(9)6-2(10)8(5)3(7)11/h(H,6,9,10) Key: CEJLBZWIKQJOAT-UHFFFAOYSA-N; InChI=1/C3HCl2N3O3/c4-7-1(9)6-2(10)8(5)3(7)11/h(H,6,9,10) Key: CEJLBZWIKQJOAT-UHFFFAOYAN
- SMILES: C1(=O)NC(=O)N(C(=O)N1Cl)Cl; ClN1C(=O)NC(=O)N(Cl)C1=O

Properties
| Chemical formula | C_{3}HCl_{2}N_{3}O_{3} |
| Molar mass | 197.96 g·mol^{−1} |
| Density | 2.2 g/cm^{3} |
| Melting point | 225 °C (437 °F; 498 K) |
- Except where otherwise noted, data are given for materials in their standard state (at 25 °C [77 °F], 100 kPa). verify (what is ?) Infobox references

Dichloroisocyanuric acid, also known as dichlor or dichloro-s-triazinetrione and is marketed under many names (e.g. troclosene), is a chemical compound with the formula (C(O)NCl)_{2}(C(O)NH).

== Synthesis ==
Dichloroisocyanuric acid is manufactured by chlorination of cyanuric acid:

(C(O)NH)_{3} + 2 Cl_{2} → (C(O)NCl)_{2}(C(O)NH) + 2 HCl

It is a colourless solid.

== Mechanism of action ==
Dichloroisocyanuric acid is an oxidizer, reacting with water to form chlorine gas.

Although the bleaching agent in most chlorine based bleach is sodium hypochlorite, the sodium salt of dichloroisocyanuric acid, sodium dichloroisocyanurate, is the active ingredient in commercial disinfectant bacteriocides, algicides, and cleaning agents such as the pulverized cleanser Comet.

When dissolved in water, cyanuric acid forms a weak bond with dissolved chlorine, protecting it from breakdown by the sun's UV rays while not preventing the chlorine from oxidizing contaminants. For outdoor pools, dichlor should be added until cyanuric acid levels reach 30-50 ppm. Thereafter, sodium hypochlorite or other forms of chlorine can be used to maintain sanitation levels without continuing to add additional cyanuric acid to the system. At very high levels, cyanuric acid can reduce the ability of free chlorine to eliminate certain microbial contaminants.

== See also ==
- Trichloroisocyanuric acid (trichlor)
