= Cif =

Cleaning product

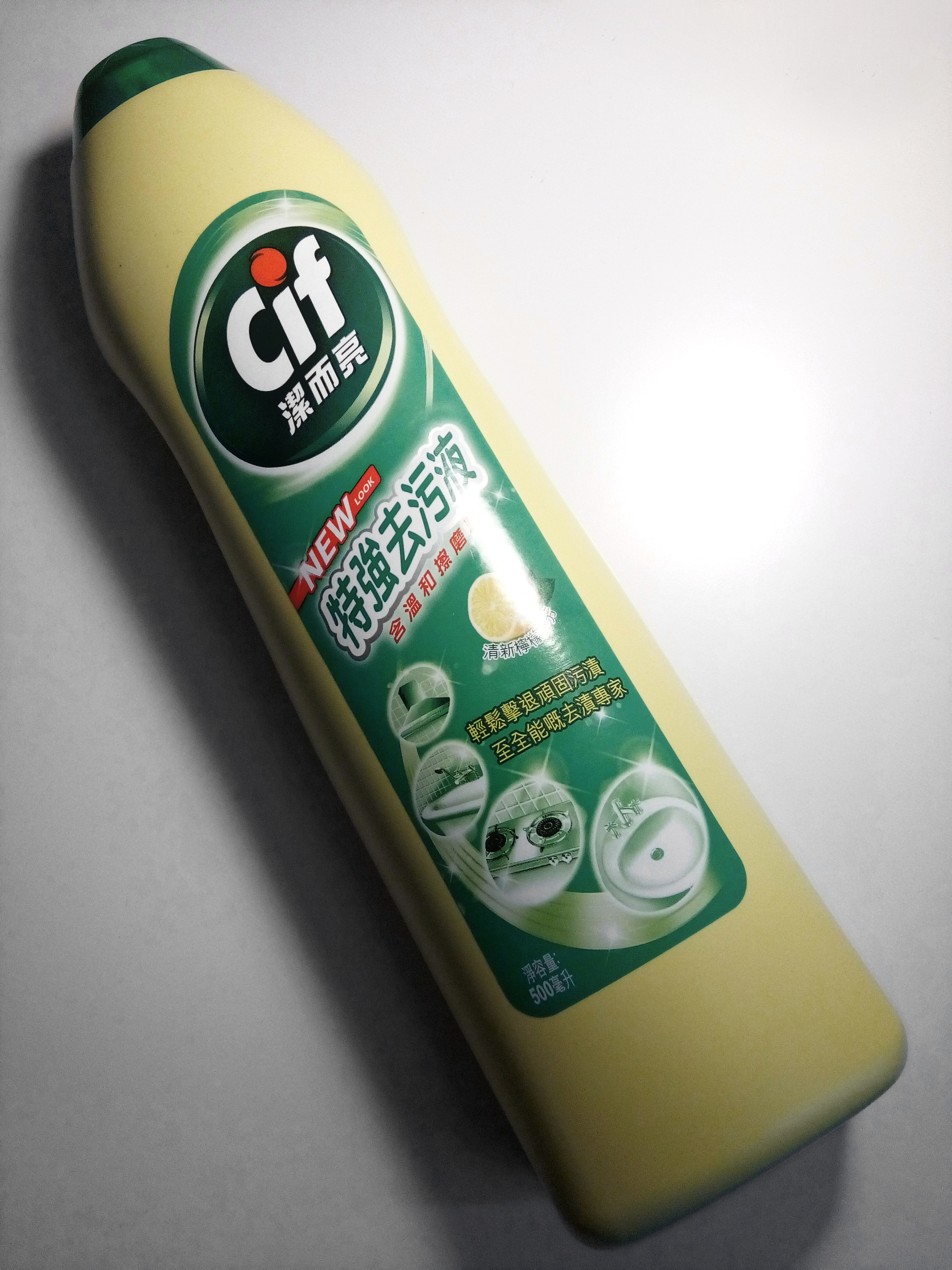
- Products sold in Hong Kong
- Product type: Household cleaning
- Current owner: Unilever
- Country: France
- Introduced: 1965; 61 years ago
- Related brands: Jif, Vim, Viss, Handy Andy
- Markets: Global
- Website: www.cifclean.co.uk www.viss.de

Cif is a French brand of household cleaning products owned by British conglomerate Unilever, known as Jif in Australia, New Zealand, Japan, Middle East and the Nordic countries.

Cif was launched in France in 1965 and was marketed in competition against scouring powders such as Vim.

== Name ==
Cif is sold under the names Jif, Vim, Viss and Handy Andy, depending on which of the 51 countries it is sold in.

In Sweden, and South Africa, the products were originally sold under the name Vim before this was changed to Jif, the launch name in the United Kingdom, Ireland, the Netherlands and Hong Kong.

In January 2001, the name in most of these countries was changed to Cif in order to align marketing and product inventories across the continent.

In Belgium, Finland and Portugal, the product was known as Vim for quite some time, after which it became Cif. In Canada it is still called Vim. In Germany, the cleaner's name is Viss. In Iraq it is still traded as Jif, with local Arabic and English writing.

In Norway, the product is traded as Jif and was formerly owned by Lilleborg, historically part of Orkla ASA until it was acquired by Solenis in 2024. The Jif brand however continues to part of Orkla. Unilever had a decades long partnership with Lilleborg when they were given the exclusive rights to the brand Jif in Norway. Lilleborg registered the trademark in 1968. Without consent from Lilleborg, Unilever registered their trademark Cif in 1998 and started selling Cif products in 2018. Thereafter Lilleborg protested and two JIF vs CIF court cases followed. The court decided that Unilever was allowed to keep the brand Cif, but not allowed to sell Cif products in Norway.

In the United States, Cif Cream Cleaner is sold as a co-branded product with Scrub Daddy.

== Products ==
- Cif Bathroom Mousse
- Cif Stainless Steel Cleaner
- Cif Bathroom Cleaner
- Cif Kitchen Cleaner
- Cif Power Cream
- Cif Cream Cleaner, a non-abrasive version
