= Biocide =

Chemical substance or microorganism used against a harmful organism

A biocide is defined in the European legislation as a chemical substance or microorganism intended to destroy, deter, render harmless, or exert a controlling effect on any harmful organism. The US Environmental Protection Agency (EPA) uses a slightly different definition for biocides as "a diverse group of poisonous substances including preservatives, insecticides, disinfectants, and pesticides used for the control of organisms that are harmful to human or animal health or that cause damage to natural or manufactured products". When compared, the two definitions roughly imply the same, although the US EPA definition includes plant protection products and some veterinary medicines.

The terms "biocides" and "pesticides" are regularly interchanged, and often confused with "plant protection products". To clarify this, pesticides include both biocides and plant protection products, where the former refers to substances for non-food and feed purposes and the latter refers to substances for food and feed purposes.

When discussing biocides a distinction should be made between the biocidal active substance and the biocidal product. The biocidal active substances are mostly chemical compounds, but can also be microorganisms (e.g. bacteria). Biocidal products contain one or more biocidal active substances and may contain other non-active co-formulants that ensure the effectiveness as well as the desired pH, viscosity, colour, odour, etc. of the final product. Biocidal products are available on the market for use by professional and/or non-professional consumers.

Although most of the biocidal active substances have a relative high toxicity, there are also examples of active substances with low toxicity, such as CO_{2}, which exhibit their biocidal activity only under certain specific conditions such as in closed systems. In such cases, the biocidal product is the combination of the active substance and the device that ensures the intended biocidal activity, i.e. suffocation of rodents by CO_{2} in a closed system trap. Another example of biocidal products available to consumers are products impregnated with biocides (also called treated articles), such as clothes and wristbands impregnated with insecticides, socks impregnated with antibacterial substances etc.

Biocides are commonly used in medicine, agriculture, forestry, and industry. Biocidal substances and products are also employed as anti-fouling agents or disinfectants under other circumstances: chlorine, for example, is used as a short-life biocide in industrial water treatment but as a disinfectant in swimming pools. Many biocides are synthetic, but there are naturally occurring biocides classified as natural biocides, derived from, e.g., bacteria and plants.

A biocide can be:

- A pesticide: this includes fungicides, herbicides, insecticides, algicides, molluscicides, miticides, piscicides, rodenticides, and slimicides.
- An antimicrobial: this includes germicides, antibiotics, antibacterials, antivirals, antifungals, antiprotozoals, and antiparasitics. See also spermicide.

== Uses ==
In Europe biocidal products are divided into different product types (PT), based on their intended use. These product types, 22 in total under the Biocidal Products Regulation (EU) 528/2012 (BPR), are grouped into four main groups, namely disinfectants, preservatives, pest control, and other biocidal products. For example, disinfectants contains products to be used for human hygiene (PT 1) and veterinary hygiene (PT 3), preservatives contains wood preservatives (PT 8), for pest control contains rodenticides (PT 14) and repellents and attractants (PT 19), while other biocidal products contains antifouling products (PT 21). One active substance can be used in several product types, such as for example sulfuryl fluoride, which is approved for use as a wood preservative (PT 8) as well as an insecticide (PT 18).

Biocides can be added to other materials (typically liquids) to protect them against biological infestation and growth. For example, certain types of quaternary ammonium compounds (quats) are added to pool water or industrial water systems to act as an algicide, protecting the water from infestation and growth of algae. It is often impractical to store and use poisonous chlorine gas for water treatment, so alternative methods of adding chlorine are used. These include hypochlorite solutions, which gradually release chlorine into the water, and compounds like sodium dichloro-s-triazinetrione (dihydrate or anhydrous), sometimes referred to as "dichlor", and trichloro-s-triazinetrione, sometimes referred to as "trichlor". These compounds are stable while solids and may be used in powdered, granular, or tablet form. When added in small amounts to pool water or industrial water systems, the chlorine atoms hydrolyze from the rest of the molecule forming hypochlorous acid (HOCl) which acts as a general biocide killing germs, micro-organisms, algae, and so on. Halogenated hydantoin compounds are also used as biocides.

== Hazards and environmental risks ==
Because biocides are intended to kill living organisms, many biocidal products pose significant risk to human health and welfare. Great care is required when handling biocides and appropriate protective clothing and equipment should be used. The use of biocides can also have significant adverse effects on the natural environment. Anti-fouling paints, especially those utilising organic tin compounds such as TBT, have been shown to have severe and long-lasting impacts on marine eco-systems and such materials are now banned in many countries for commercial and recreational vessels (though sometimes still used for naval vessels).

Disposal of used or unwanted biocides must be undertaken carefully to avoid serious and potentially long-lasting damage to the environment.

== Classification ==
=== European classification ===
The classification of biocides in the BPR is broken down into 22 product types (i.e. application categories), with several comprising multiple subgroups:

MAIN GROUP 1: Disinfectants and general biocidal products

- Product-type 1: Human hygiene biocidal products
- Product-type 2: Private area and public health area disinfectants and other biocidal products
- Product-type 3: Veterinary hygiene biocidal products
- Product-type 4: Food and feed area disinfectants
- Product-type 5: Drinking water disinfectants

MAIN GROUP 2: Preservatives

- Product-type 6: In-can preservatives
- Product-type 7: Film preservatives
- Product-type 8: Wood preservatives
- Product-type 9: Fibre, leather, rubber and polymerised materials preservatives
- Product-type 10: Masonry preservatives
- Product-type 11: Preservatives for liquid-cooling and processing systems
- Product-type 12: Slimicides
- Product-type 13: Metalworking-fluid preservatives

MAIN GROUP 3: Pest control

- Product-type 14: Rodenticides
- Product-type 15: Avicides
- Product-type 16: Molluscicides
- Product-type 17: Piscicides
- Product-type 18: Insecticides, acaricides, and products to control other arthropods
- Product-type 19: Repellents and attractants
- Product-type 20: Control of other vertebrates

MAIN GROUP 4: Other biocidal products

- Product-type 21: Antifouling products
- Product-type 22: Embalming and taxidermist fluids

== Legislation ==
The EU regulatory framework for biocides has for years been defined by the Directive 98/8/EC, also known as the Biocidal Products Directive (BPD). The BPD was revoked by the Biocidal Products Regulation 528/2012 (BPR), which entered into force on 17 July 2012 with the application date of 1 September 2013. Several Technical Notes for Guidance (TNsG) have been developed to facilitate the implementation of the BPR and to assure a common understanding of its obligations. According to the EU legislation, biocidal products need authorisation to be placed or to remain on the market. Competent Authorities of the EU member states are responsible for assessing and approving the active substances contained in the biocides. The BPR follows some of the principles set previously under the REACH Regulation (Registration, Evaluation, Authorisation and Restrictions of Chemicals) and the coordination of the risk assessment process for both REACH and BPR are mandated to the European Chemicals Agency (ECHA), which assures the harmonization and integration of risk characterization methodologies between the two regulations.

The biocides legislation puts emphasis on making the Regulation compatible with the World Trade Organization (WTO) rules and requirements and with the Globally Harmonized System of Classification and Labelling of Chemicals (GHS), as well as with the OECD programme on testing methods. Exchange of information requires the use of the OECD harmonised templates implemented in IUCLID – the International Unified Chemical Information Data System (see ECHA and OECD websites).

Many biocides in the US are regulated under the Federal Pesticide Law (FIFRA) and its subsequent amendments, although some fall under the Federal Food, Drugs and Cosmetic Act, which includes plant protection products (see websites below). In Europe, the plant protection products are placed on the market under another regulatory framework, managed by the European Food Safety Authority (EFSA).

== Risk assessment ==
Due to their intrinsic properties and patterns of use, biocides, such as rodenticides or insecticides, can cause adverse effects in humans, animals and the environment and should therefore be used with the utmost care. For example, the anticoagulants used for rodent control have caused toxicity in non-target species, such as predatory birds, due to their long half-life after ingestion by target species (i.e. rats and mice) and high toxicity to non-target species. Pyrethroids used as insecticides have been shown to cause unwanted effects in the environment, due to their unspecific toxic action, also causing toxic effects in non-target aquatic organisms.

In light of potential adverse effects, and to ensure a harmonised risk assessment and management, the EU regulatory framework for biocides has been established with the objective of ensuring a high level of protection of human and animal health and the environment. To this aim, it is required that risk assessment of biocidal products is carried out before they can be placed on the market. A central element in the risk assessment of the biocidal products are the utilization instructions that defines the dosage, application method and number of applications and thus the exposure of humans and the environment to the biocidal substance.

Humans may be exposed to biocidal products in different ways in both occupational and domestic settings. Many biocidal products are intended for industrial sectors or professional uses only, whereas other biocidal products are commonly available for private use by non-professional users. In addition, potential exposure of non-users of biocidal products (i.e. the general public) may occur indirectly via the environment, for example through drinking water, the food chain, as well as through atmospheric and residential exposure. Particular attention should be paid to the exposure of vulnerable sub-populations, such as the elderly, pregnant women, and children. Also pets and other domestic animals can be exposed indirectly following the application of biocidal products. Furthermore, exposure to biocides may vary in terms of route (inhalation, dermal contact, and ingestion) and pathway (food, drinking water, residential, occupational) of exposure, level, frequency and duration.

The environment can be exposed directly due to the outdoor use of biocides or as the result of indoor use followed by release to the sewage system after e.g. wet cleaning of a room in which a biocide is used. Upon this release a biocidal substance can pass a sewage treatment plant (STP) and, based on its physical chemical properties, partition to sewage sludge, which in turn can be used for soil amendments thereby releasing the substance into the soil compartment. Alternatively, the substance can remain in the water phase in the STP and subsequently end up in the water compartment such as surface water etc. Risk assessment for the environment focuses on protecting the environmental compartments (air, water and soil) by performing hazard assessments on key species, which represent the food chain within the specific compartment. Of special concern is a well functioning STP, which is elemental in many removal processes. The large variety in biocidal applications leads to complicated exposure scenarios that need to reflect the intended use and possible degradation pathways, in order to perform an accurate risk assessment for the environment. Further areas of concern are endocrine disruption, PBT-properties, secondary poisoning, and mixture toxicity.

Biocidal products are often composed of mixtures of one or more active substances together with co-formulants such as stabilisers, preservatives and colouring agents. Since these substances may act together to produce a combination effect, an assessment of the risk from each of these substances alone may underestimate the real risk from the product as a whole. Several concepts are available for predicting the effect of a mixture on the basis of known toxicities and concentrations of the single components. Approaches for mixture toxicity assessments for regulatory purposes typically advocate assumptions of additive effects;. This means that each substance in the mixture is assumed to contribute to a mixture effect in direct proportion to its concentration and potency. In a strict sense, the assumption is thereby that all substances act by the same mode or mechanism of action. Compared to other available assumptions, this concentration addition model (or dose addition model) can be used with commonly available (eco)toxicity data and effect data together with estimates of e.g. LC50, EC50, PNEC, AEL. Furthermore, assumptions of additive effects from any given mixture are generally considered as a more precautionary approach compared to other available predictive concepts.

The potential occurrence of synergistic effects presents a special case, and may occur for example when one substance increases the toxicity of another, e.g. if substance A inhibits the detoxification of substance B. Currently, predictive approaches cannot account for this phenomenon. Gaps in our knowledge of the modes of action of substances as well as circumstances under which such effects may occur (e.g. mixture composition, exposure concentrations, species and endpoints) often hamper predictive approaches. Indications that synergistic effects might occur in a product will warrant either a more precautionary approach, or product testing.chemical

As indicated above, the risk assessment of biocides in EU hinges for a large part by the development of specific emission scenario documents (ESDs) for each product type, which is essential for assessing its exposure of man and the environment. Such ESDs provide detailed scenarios to be used for an initial worse case exposure assessment and for subsequent refinements. ESDs are developed in close collaboration with the OECD Task Force on Biocides and the OECD Exposure Assessment Task Force and are publicly available from websites managed by the Joint Research Centre and OECD (see below). Once ESDs become available they are introduced in the European Union System for the Evaluation of Substances (EUSES), an IT tool supporting the implementation of the risk assessment principles set in the Technical Guidance Document for the Risk Assessment of Biocides (TGD). EUSES enables government authorities, research institutes and chemical companies to carry out rapid and efficient assessments of the general risks posed by substances to man and the environment.

Once a biocidal active substance is allowed onto the list of approved active substances, its specifications become a reference source of that active substance (so called 'reference active substance'). Thus, when an alternative source of that active substance appears (e.g. from a company that have not participated in the Review Programme of active substances) or when a change appears in the manufacturing location and/or manufacturing process of a reference active substance, then a technical equivalence between these different sources needs to be established with regard to the chemical composition and hazard profile. This is to check if the level of hazard posed to health and environment by the active substance from the secondary source is comparable to the initial assessed active substance.

It goes without saying that biocidal products must be used in an appropriate and controlled way. The amount utilized of an active substance should be minimized to that necessary to reach the desired effects thereby reducing the load on the environment and the linked potential adverse effects. In order to define the conditions of use and to ensure that the product fulfils its intended uses, efficacy assessments are carried out as an essential part of the risk assessment. Within the efficacy assessment the target organisms, the effective concentrations, including any thresholds or dependence of the effects on concentrations, the likely concentrations of the active substance used in the products, the mode of action, and the possible occurrence of resistance, cross resistance or tolerance is evaluated. A product cannot be authorized if the desired effect cannot be reached at a dose without posing unacceptable risks to human health or the environment. Appropriate management strategies needs to be taken to avoid the buildup of (cross)resistance. Last but not least, other fundamental elements are the instructions of use, the risk management measures and the risk communication, which is under responsibility of the EU member states.

While biocides can have severe effects on human health and/or the environment, their benefits should not be overlooked. To provide some examples, without the above-mentioned rodenticides, crops and food stocks might be seriously affected by rodent activity, or diseases like Leptospirosis might be spread more easily, since rodents can be a vector for diseases. It is difficult to imagine hospitals, food industry premises without using disinfectants or using untreated wood for telephone poles. Another example of benefit is the fuel saving of antifouling substances applied to ships to prevent the buildup of biofilm and subsequent fouling organisms on the hulls which increase the drag during navigation.

== See also ==
- Fungicide
- Integrated pest management
- Non-pesticide management
- Oligodynamic effect
- Virucide

== Literature ==
- Wilfried Paulus: Directory of Microbicides for the Protection of Materials and Processes. Springer Netherland, Berlin 2006, ISBN 1-4020-4861-0.
- Danish EPA (2001): Inventory of Biocides used in Denmark
- Wittmer IK, Scheidegger R, Bader HP, Singer H, Stamm C (2011). "Loss rates of urban biocides can exceed those of agricultural pesticides". Science of the Total Environment. 409 (5): 920–932. Bibcode:2011ScTEn.409..920W. doi:10.1016/j.scitotenv.2010.11.031. PMID 21183204.
- Christensen FM, Eisenreich EJ, Rasmussen K, Riego-Sintes J, Sokull-Kluettgen B, Van de Plassche EJ (2011). "European Experience in Chemicals Management: Integrating Science into Policy". Environmental Science and Technology. 45 (1): 80–89. doi:10.1021/es101541b. PMID 20958022.
- SCHER, SCCS, SCENIHR. (2012) Opinion on the Toxicity and Assessment of Chemical Mixtures https://web.archive.org/web/20160305110234/http://ec.europa.eu/health/scientific_committees/consultations/public_consultations/scher_consultation_06_en.htm
