= Dylon =

British brand of textile dyes and household chemicals

Dylon International is a British brand of textile dyes and other household chemicals. It was founded in 1946 by the Mayborn Group. The Mayborn Group sold Dylon International to European homecare company Spotless Group in 2008. Spotless Group was acquired by Henkel in 2014 which is the current owner of Dylon.

Dylon products are made in the Republic of Ireland. Dylon's former London factory has been redeveloped as the Dylon Works.

Dye brands include Cold Water Dye, Machine Fabric Dye and Multipurpose Dye.

== Hot water dye ==
This a range of textile dyes which are used at high temperatures. They are reactive azo dyes and dichlorotriazine is the main group present. They require hot fix (sodium carbonate) and common salt (sodium chloride). It comes in 2 colours.

== Machine Fabric Dye ==
Dylon's machine fabric dye and hand dye both contain reactive azo dyes, triphenylmethane dyes, sodium carbonate and sodium chloride. The reactive groups are either pyrimidine or vinylsulphone. Machine Fabric Dye comes in 32 colours, Hand Dye in 21 colours.

== Multipurpose Dye ==
This range contains a mixture of 3 different dyes - direct, acid and disperse. Direct dyes are for cellulose based fabrics, acid dyes for wool and nylon and disperse for some plastics. None of these are reactive dyes and are less wash fast than the other ranges. It comes in 26 colours.
