= Spotless Group =

Pan-European manufacturer of insect control and laundry products

- Industry: Consumer Products
- Founded: 2005; 21 years ago
- Headquarters: Paris, France
- Products: Colour Catcher, Keep it White, Vim, Ballerina, Vigor, Eparcyl, Punch, Dylon
- Parent: Henkel
- Website: www.spotlessgroup.eu

Spotless Group SAS was a pan-European manufacturer of insect control and laundry products, based in Paris, France. In 2015, it became part of Germany's Henkel group.

== Operations ==
Spotless Group was established by AXA Private Equity (renamed Ardian in 2013) in 2005, upon AXAs acquisition of French homecare company Eau Ecarlate. The incumbent CEO of Eau Ecarlate, Pierre le Tanneur, assumed the presidency of Spotless.

In 2006, the second year of its existence, Spotless Group acquired Bologna-based homecare company Guaber and Irish shoe-care manufacturer Punch Industries. The group made further acquisitions in 2007, of sewerage disposal company Eparcyl and the Unilever brand Ballerina. In 2008, the company purchased Dylon International, the UK's leading dye producer, from the Mayborn Group. Spotless Group owns a total of 18 brands as of 2008.

In 2010, AXA Private Equity (renamed Ardian in 2013) sold its 65.6% stake in Spotless Group to British private-equity company BC Partners for a reported €600 million, according to Reuters.

In 2014, Germany's Henkel, a specialist in laundry products, offered to buy Spotless for 940 million Euros (about $1.3 billion) in cash. "By acquiring the Spotless Group, we will strengthen our market position and enter highly profitable growth segments," Henkel chief executive Kasper Rorsted told reporters. The deal, which was subject to approval from antitrust authorities, was completed in May 2015. The deal would slightly increase Henkel's share of the $82 billion global laundry care market to 8.7%, still well behind Procter & Gamble's 26.6% and the 14.8% market share held by Unilever, which sells Persil detergent - a Henkel brand - in some markets.

== Subsidiaries ==
Spotless Group had subsidiaries in 8 European Countries:

- Guaber, Italy
- Spotless Hungary, Hungary
- Punch Industries, Ireland
- Eau Ecarlate, France
- Spotless UK, United Kingdom
- Spotless Benelux, Netherlands
- Spotless Iberia, Spain
- Boston Scandinavia, Sweden

== Products ==
Spotless Group owned the brand Colour Catcher, which is the market leader in washing machine colour protection. Other Spotless Group brands include:

- Punch
- Vim
- Ballerina
- Eparcyl
- Dylon
- Vigor
- Boston
- Punch
- Fito
- Bloom
- Cucal
- Vapona
- Catch
- Dum Dum
- Tupic
- Carcomin
- Zensect
- Globol
- Tabard
- Iba
- Dr.Optic
- Lord Sheraton furniture polish range (manufactured in San Marino).
