= Sodium dichloroisocyanurate =

Names
- IUPAC name Sodium 3,5-dichloro-2,4,6-trioxo-1,3,5-triazinan-1-ide
- Other names: Sodium dichloroisocyanurate; Sodium troclosene; Sodic troclosene

Identifiers
CAS Number	2893-78-9; 51580-86-0 (dihydrate)
3D model (JSmol)	Interactive image
ChemSpider	451165
ECHA InfoCard	100.018.880
PubChem CID	517121
RTECS number	XZ1900000
UNII	07M9U9U0LK; 8027SYQ9X3 (dihydrate)
UN number	2465 or 3077
CompTox Dashboard (EPA)	DTXSID3024994
- InChI: InChI=1S/C3HCl2N3O3.Na/c4-7-1(9)6-2(10)8(5)3(7)11;/h(H,6,9,10);/q;+1/p-1 Key: MSFGZHUJTJBYFA-UHFFFAOYSA-M; InChI=1S/C3HCl2N3O3.Na/c4-7-1(9)6-2(10)8(5)3(7)11;/h(H,6,9,10);/q;+1/p-1 Key: MSFGZHUJTJBYFA-REWHXWOFAV; Key: MSFGZHUJTJBYFA-UHFFFAOYSA-M
- SMILES: [Na+].ClN1C(=O)[N-]C(=O)N(Cl)C1=O

Properties
Chemical formula	C_{3}Cl_{2}N_{3}NaO_{3}
Molar mass	219.95 g/mol (anhydrous) 255.98 g/mol (dihydrate)
Appearance	white, crystalline powder
Odor	chlorine-like
Density	0.7 g/cm^{3} (as granules)
Melting point	225 °C (437 °F; 498 K)
Solubility in water	22.7 g/100 mL (25 °C)
Solubility in acetone	0.5 g/100 mL (30 °C)
Acidity (pK_{a})	6.2-6.8

Hazards
- GHS labelling
Pictograms	(GHS03: Oxidizing) (GHS05: Corrosive) (GHS07: Exclamation mark) (GHS09: Environmental hazard)
Signal word	Danger
Hazard statements	H272, H302, H314, H319, H335, H410
Precautionary statements	P210, P220, P260, P264, P264+P265, P270, P271, P273, P280, P301+P317, P301+P330+P331, P302+P361+P354, P304+P340, P305+P351+P338, P305+P354+P338, P316, P317, P319, P321, P330, P337+P317, P363, P370+P378, P391, P403+P233, P405, P501
NFPA 704 (fire diamond)	2 0 1 W
- Lethal dose or concentration (LD, LC)
LD_{50} (median dose)	(Rat oral) 1670 mg/kg

Related compounds
Other cations	Potassium dichloroisocyanurate Calcium dichloroisocyanurate Lithium dichloroisocyanurate Barium dichloroisocyanurate
- Except where otherwise noted, data are given for materials in their standard state (at 25 °C [77 °F], 100 kPa). verify (what is ?) Infobox references

Sodium dichloroisocyanurate (INN: sodium troclosene, troclosenum natricum or NaDCC or SDIC) is a chemical compound widely used as a cleansing agent and disinfectant. It is a colorless, water-soluble solid, produced as a result of reaction of cyanuric acid with chlorine. The dihydrate is also known (51580-86-0 ) as is the potassium salt (2244-21-5 ).

== Uses ==
It is mainly used as a disinfectant, biocide and industrial deodorant. It is found in some modern water purification tablets/filters. It is more efficient than the formerly used halazone water disinfectant. In these applications, it is a slow-release source of chlorine in low concentrations at a relatively constant rate. As a disinfectant, it is used to sterilize drinking water, swimming pools, tableware and air, and to fight against infectious diseases as a routine disinfection agent.

It can be used for disinfection and environmental sterilization, for example in livestock, poultry, fish and silkworm raising, for bleaching textiles, for cleaning industrial circulating water, and to prevent wool from shrinking.

The reaction between NaDCC and a dilute solution of copper (II) sulfate produces an intense lilac precipitate of the complex salt sodium copper dichloroisocyanurate. The reactions between dichloroisocyanurate salts (Na, K, Li, Ba, Ca) and transition metal salts (Ni, Cu, Cd) are described in patent US 3,055,889. The overall reaction is:

CuSO_{4} + 4 Na(C_{3}N_{3}O_{3}Cl_{2}) → Na_{2}[Cu(C_{3}N_{3}O_{3}Cl_{2})_{4}] + Na_{2}SO_{4}

Sodium dichloroisocyanurate reacts with concentrated (130 vol, 35%) hydrogen peroxide to create singlet oxygen which emits red light upon decomposition.

It is considered hazardous according to OSHA 29 CFR 1910.1200. High-level exposure can cause reactive airways dysfunction syndrome (R.A.D.S.)

== See also ==
- Comet (cleanser)
- Dichloroisocyanuric acid (dichlor)
- Trichloroisocyanuric acid (trichlor)
- Calcium hypochlorite
