= Slimicide =

Broad-spectrum antimicrobial pesticide

Slimicide (or antislime agent) is a broad-spectrum antimicrobial pesticide used to kill slime-producing microorganisms such as algae, bacteria, fungi, and slime molds. One primary application domain is in the papermaking industry, where it reduces the occurrence of paper holes and spots, as well as protecting the machinery from odor, clogs, corrosion, and breakdown. Slimicides come in variants effective in acidic and/or alkaline media, in liquid or solid form, and are based on chemicals such as aldehydes, bromium or quaternary ammonium compounds, and others. Additional significant application areas for slimicides include industrial water recirculation systems such as cooling towers, fuel storage tanks and wells, and in conjunction with fluids used for oil extraction. In some application domains, slimicides may be formulated specifically to target slime molds.
