= Bon Ami Company =

American manufacturing company

Faultless Brands
- Company type: Private
- Industry: Manufacturing; Consumer goods
- Founded: 1886
- Founder: Major Thomas G. Beaham
- Headquarters: Kansas City, Missouri, United States
- Area served: Worldwide
- Products: See list of Faultless Brands products
- Number of employees: 201–500
- Website: Faultless.com

Faultless Brands is a manufacturing business, producing laundry, household cleaning products, air care, and lawn and garden products. The company headquarters are located in Kansas City, Missouri, United States.

== History ==
In 1886, Major Thomas G. Beaham (1842–1909) went to Kansas City and bought into a company selling coffee, tea, and spices, which was to become Beaham & Moffit. Later, it was renamed Faultless Starch Company. After adding Bon Ami products to the line, the company once again was registered as Faultless Starch/Bon Ami Company in 1974.

Major Beaham's first product, dry white starch, was used widely in the 1880s, because it was simple to use and did not require lengthy boiling.

=== Faultless Starch Books ===
Faultless Starch Books

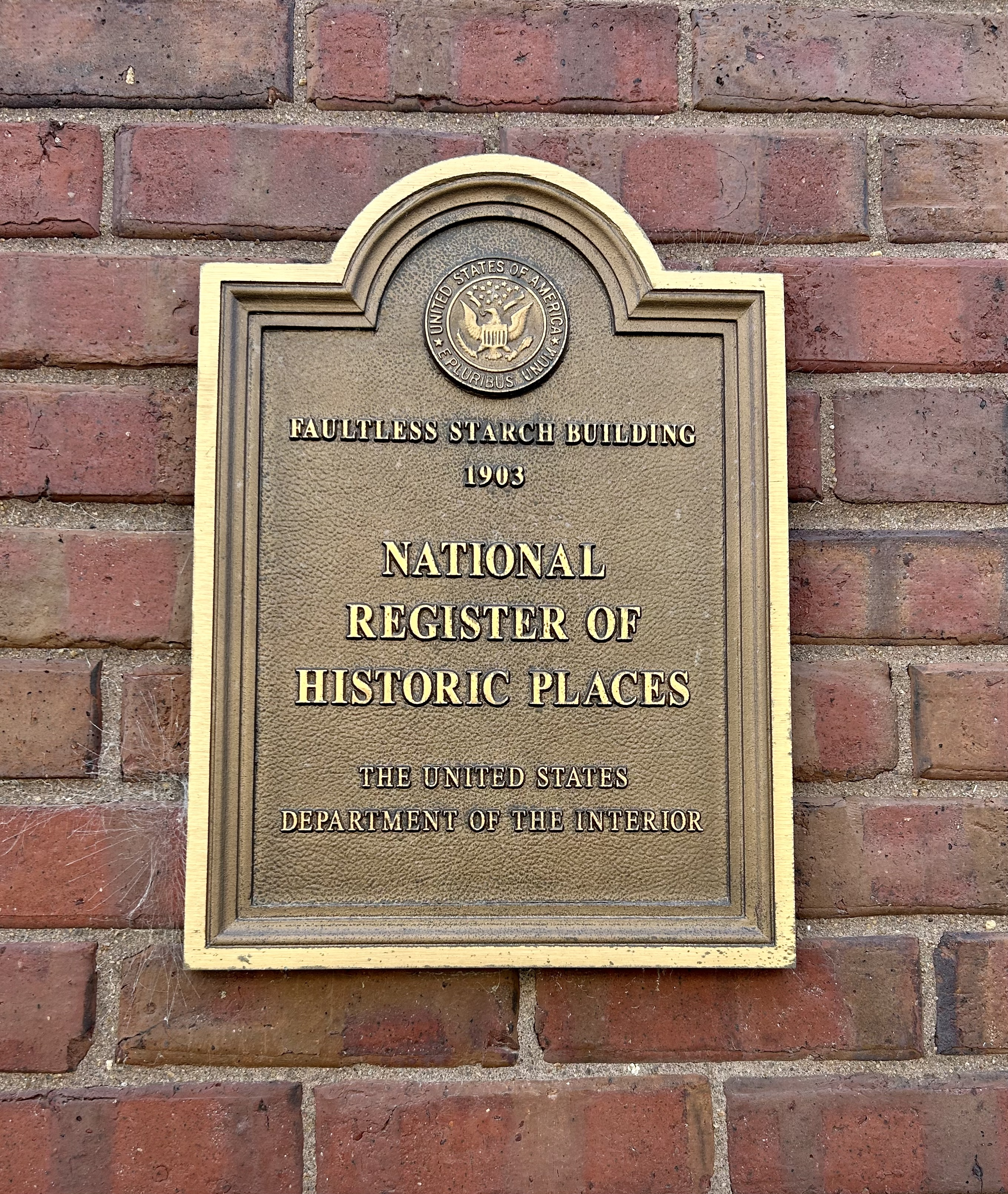
National Historic Register of Places in the U.S. marker on the original company building

The 'Faultless Starch Books' were a line of primers that were given to early purchasers of the product from the 1890s. They were used as a marketing technique by John Nesbitt. Thirty-six of the books were published from the 1890s to the 1930s, including such children's staples as the ABC book, Little Red Riding Hood, and The Ant and Grasshopper, to name a few.

== Headquarters ==
Faultless Brands is located in Kansas City, Missouri, USA.

=== 1800s to 2008 ===
The original Faultless Starch Company plant was located in the West Bottoms area of Kansas City but was destroyed in the flood of 1903. It was rebuilt nearby, at 1025 West Eighth Street, as a six-story building designed by local architecture firm Shepard and Farrar.

As the company grew and required more space, the plant continued to expand at the existing site at 1025 West Eighth Street. In 1968, it was apparent that the business had outgrown its office space within the plant building. The New England Building, constructed in 1887 (the year Faultless was founded), was purchased. The company offices moved into the building at Ninth and Wyandotte Streets in 1978. In 1991, the company moved its offices to the River Market district of Kansas City.

The company moved to its current headquarters in 2009.
