= Triammonium citrate =

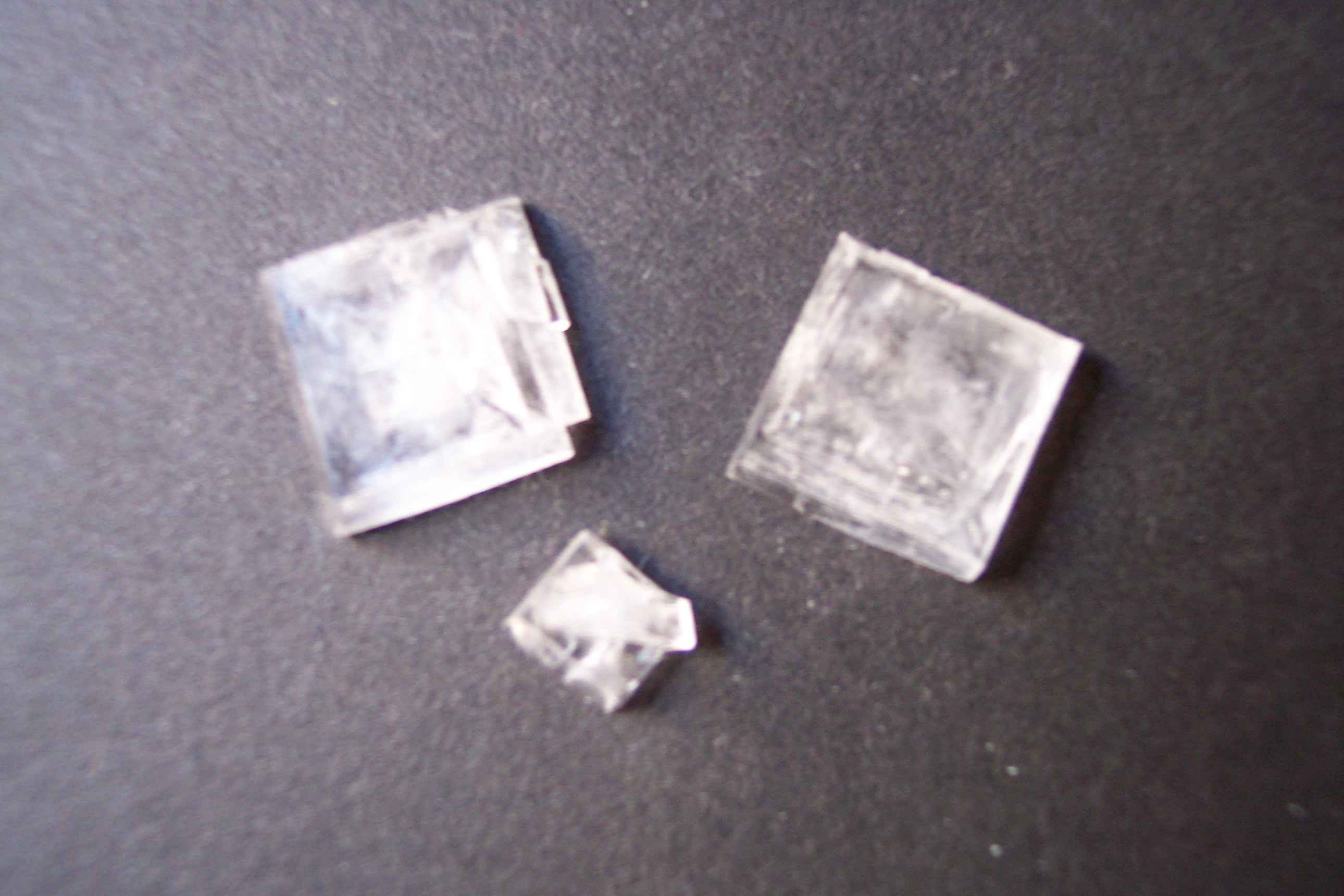

Names
- IUPAC name Ammonium 2-hydroxypropane-1,2,3-tricarboxylate
- Other names Ammonium citrate tribasic; Ammonium citrate

Identifiers
CAS Number	3458-72-8
3D model (JSmol)	Interactive image
ChEBI	CHEBI:63037
ChemSpider	17896
ECHA InfoCard	100.020.359
EC Number	222-394-5
E number	E380 (antioxidants, ...)
PubChem CID	18954
UNII	J90A52459R
UN number	3077
CompTox Dashboard (EPA)	DTXSID10889469
- InChI: InChI=1S/C6H8O7.3H3N/c7-3(8)1-6(13,5(11)12)2-4(9)10;;;/h13H,1-2H2,(H,7,8)(H,9,10)(H,11,12);3*1H3 Key: YWYZEGXAUVWDED-UHFFFAOYSA-N
- SMILES: C(C(=O)[O-])C(CC(=O)[O-])(C(=O)[O-])O.[NH4+].[NH4+].[NH4+]

Properties
Chemical formula	C_{6}H_{17}N_{3}O_{7}
Molar mass	243.216 g·mol^{−1}
Density	1.48

Hazards
- GHS labelling
Pictograms	(GHS07: Exclamation mark)
Signal word	Warning
Hazard statements	H315, H319, H335
Precautionary statements	P261, P264, P271, P280, P302+P352, P304+P340, P305+P351+P338, P312, P321, P332+P313, P337+P313, P362, P403+P233, P405, P501
- Except where otherwise noted, data are given for materials in their standard state (at 25 °C [77 °F], 100 kPa). Infobox references

Triammonium citrate is a chemical compound whose molecular formula is C_{6}H_{17}N_{3}O_{7}.

== Synopsis ==
It was patented some date prior to 1986.

This substance causes serious eye irritation, causes skin irritation and may cause respiratory irritation.

It is known in the European E number food additive series as E380. It is known in the United States as "an indirect food additive for use only as a component of adhesives", and as a "substance added directly to human food affirmed as generally recognized as safe (GRAS)."

Triammonium citrate is a chelating agent. This property has led to its use as a rust-removing surface cleaner, as well as a pH neutralizing substance in soil remediation.
