= Bar Keepers Friend =

Brand of cleaning agents

- The Bar Keepers Friend logo, designed to resemble saloon doors

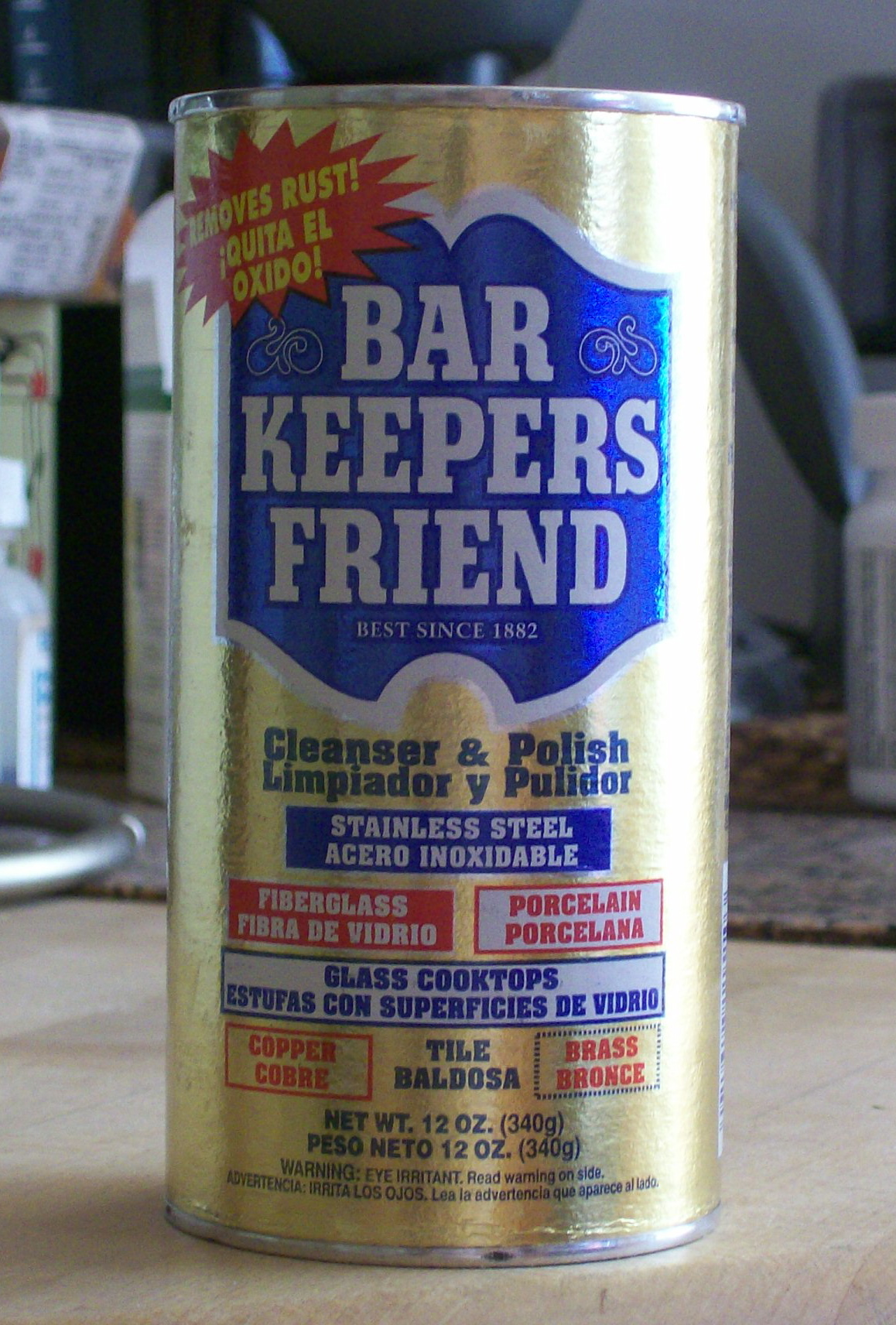
- A can of Bar Keepers Friend in 2010, with English and Spanish text
- Product type: Powdered cleaning agent, liquid and spray cleansers
- Current owner: SerVaas Laboratories, Inc. (1957–present)
- Produced by: SerVaas Laboratories, Inc.
- Country: United States
- Introduced: 1882
- Markets: United States, Canada, United Kingdom
- Website: www.barkeepersfriend.com

Bar Keepers Friend is an American brand of cleaning agents. The original canned scouring powder product has been manufactured and sold since 1882. It was invented by a chemist in Indianapolis, Indiana, where it continues to be manufactured by SerVaas Laboratories. The canned product's primary active ingredient is oxalic acid. Bar Keepers Friend has various cleaning uses.

== Overview ==
Bar Keepers Friend was originally manufactured in 1882 as a cleaning agent in powdered form. This formulation is still manufactured today. It was invented by chemist George William Hoffman in Indianapolis, Indiana. The product was originally sold to bars in Indianapolis and Hoffman asserted in a trademark application that the name had been used since January, 1887. The formula contains oxalic acid as a primary ingredient.

The Bar Keepers Friend logo represents the swinging doors of a saloon.

In the 1950s the product became the base of a line of cleaning products made by Indianapolis-based SerVaas Laboratories, which started producing and carrying products under the Bar Keepers Friend brand name. Additional products manufactured and marketed under the Bar Keepers Friend brand name include liquid, cream and spray cleaners. SerVaas Laboratories had 40 employees in May 2011 and 54 in April 2016.

== Production ==
Bar Keepers Friend products are mass-produced in a manufacturing environment that has significant automation in the process. The powdered and canned (original) product is formulated in separate two-ton batches during the production process. In September 2016, the canned powdered product was manufactured at a rate of approximately 60,000 cans per day, which are packaged in 12 oz (340 g), 15 oz (430 g) and 21 oz (600 g) cans.

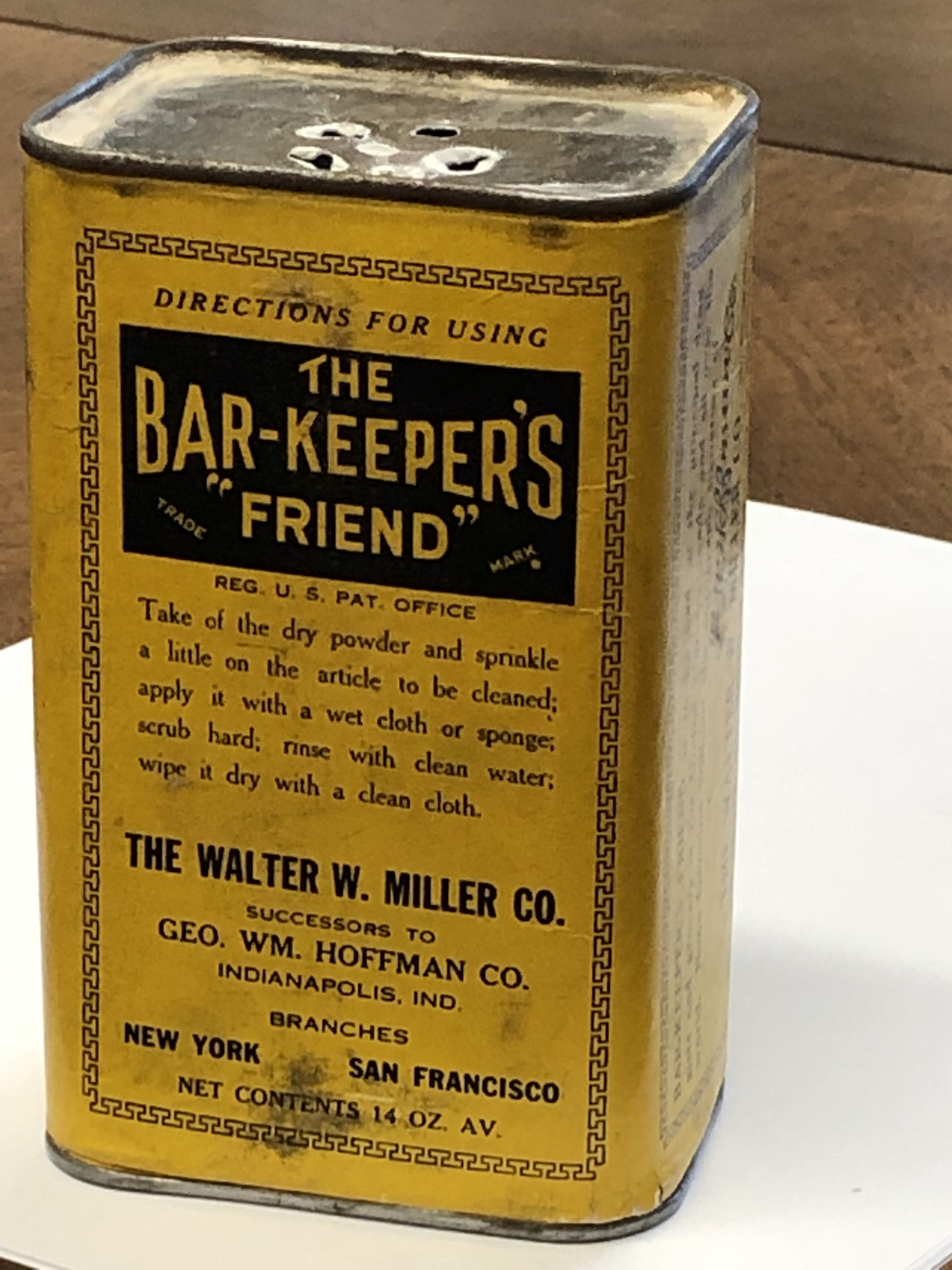
Walter Miller Co era Bar Keepers Friend Packaging

== Active ingredients ==
According to the February 26, 2020 Safety data sheet (SDS), Bar Keepers Friend Cleanser contains:

- 85–94% glass oxide (CAS 65997–17–3),
- 5–10% oxalic acid (CAS 144–62–7), and
- 1–5% benzene sulfonic acid, mono C10–16 derivatives, sodium salt (CAS 68081–81–2).

Prolonged use and extended skin contact may cause irritation, peeling and contact dermatitis. The product can also be an eye irritant. Personal protective equipment such as protective gloves and eye protection is recommended when handling the cleanser. Dust from the product may also cause mild respiratory irritation.

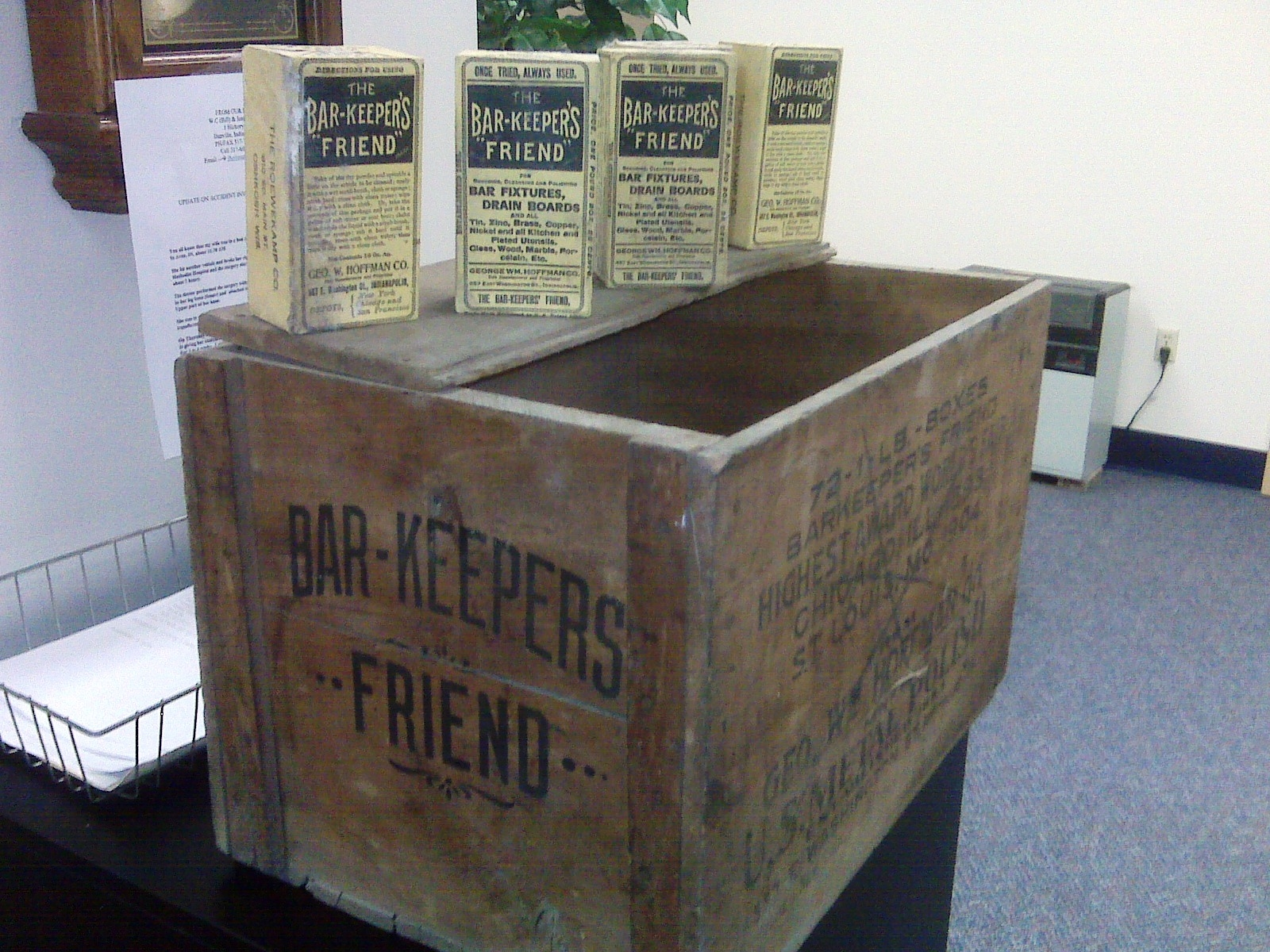
George Hoffman-era 1 lb Bar Keepers Friend boxes with wood shipping crate

== Performance and uses ==
In 1994, Consumer Reports found Bar Keepers Friend to perform on a par with Mr. Clean for removing baked-on soil, tea stains and other pot stains, and that it was better at removing rust. While recommending Bar Keepers Friend for a variety of household cleaning uses, author Heather Solos warned that it should not be used to clean silverware, pewter or real marble.

The product serves to make stainless steel resistant to oxidation via the process of passivation and can remove rust on stainless steel. The product can also remove small scratches from stainless steel, silver and plates.

Uses of Bar Keepers Friend that are not noted on its label include removing hard water stains from glass and windows and removing the brown or yellow stains caused by sunscreen containing avobenzone. The product can also clean teak wood and bleaches it.

== See also ==
- List of cleaning products
