= Ammonium oleate =

Identifiers
| CAS Number | 544-60-5 |
| 3D model (JSmol) | Interactive image |
| ChemSpider | 4940583 |
| ECHA InfoCard | 100.008.067 |
| EC Number | 208-873-1 |
| PubChem CID | 6435897 |
| UNII | EH7L6J9LHN |
| CompTox Dashboard (EPA) | DTXSID50878372 |
- InChI: InChI=1S/C18H34O2.H3N/c1-2-3-4-5-6-7-8-9-10-11-12-13-14-15-16-17-18(19)20;/h9-10H,2-8,11-17H2,1H3,(H,19,20);1H3/b10-9-; Key: WFXRJNDIBXZNJK-KVVVOXFISA-N
- SMILES: CCCCCCCCC=CCCCCCCCC(=O)O.N

Properties
| Chemical formula | C_{18}H_{37}NO_{2} |
| Molar mass | 299.499 g·mol^{−1} |
| Appearance | brown solid |
| Density | 0.903 g/cm^{3} |
| Melting point | 71 °C (decomposes) |
| Solubility in water | soluble |

Hazards
- GHS labelling
| Pictograms | (GHS07: Exclamation mark) |
| Signal word | Warning |
| Hazard statements | H315, H319, H335 |
| Precautionary statements | P261, P264, P271, P280, P302+P352, P304+P340, P305+P351+P338, P362, P403+P233, P405, P501 |
- Except where otherwise noted, data are given for materials in their standard state (at 25 °C [77 °F], 100 kPa). Infobox references

Ammonium oleate is a chemical compound with the chemical formula C_{17}H_{33}COONH_{4}. This is an organic ammonium salt of oleic acid.

== Synthesis ==
Ammonium oleate is formed by the reaction between oleic acid and aqueous ammonia.

== Physical properties ==
Ammonium oleate emits toxic oxides of nitrogen when heated excessively. It is soluble in water.

== Uses ==
The compound is used in agriculture as a deer and rabbit repellent.
