= Household chemicals =

Chemicals common in an average household

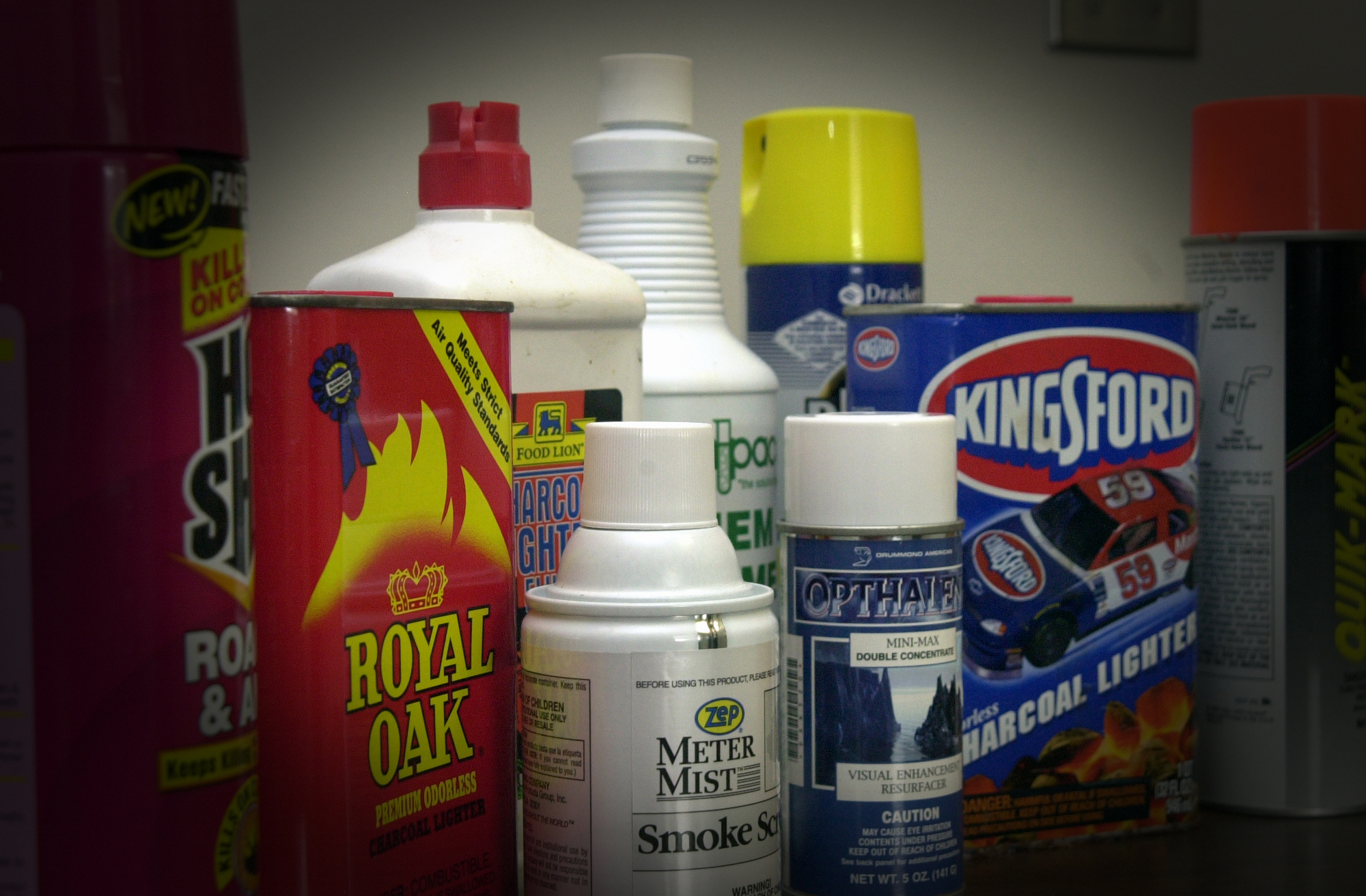
A selection of common household chemicals such as Hot Shot insecticide, Kingsford charcoal, and Behold furniture polish.

Household chemicals are non-food chemicals that are commonly found and used in and around the average household. They are a type of consumer goods, designed particularly to assist cleaning, house and yard maintenance, cooking, pest control and general hygiene purposes, often stored in the kitchen or garage.

Food additives generally do not fall under this category, unless they have a use other than for human consumption. Additives in general (e.g. stabilizers and coloring found in washing powder and dishwasher detergents) make the classification of household chemicals more complex, especially in terms of health - some of these chemicals are irritants or potent allergens - and ecological effects.

Together with non-compostable household waste, the chemicals found in private household commodities pose a serious ecological problem. In addition to having slightly adverse up to seriously toxic effects when swallowed, chemical agents around may contain flammable or corrosive substances.

== Purposes ==
Various household cleaning products have been developed to help remove dust and dirt, for surface maintenance, and for disinfection. Products are available in powder, liquid or spray form. The basic ingredients determine the type of cleaning tasks for which they are suitable. Some are marketed as general-purpose cleaning materials, while others are targeted at specific cleaning tasks such as drain clearing, oven cleaning, lime scale removal and polishing furniture. Household cleaning products provide aesthetic and hygiene benefits, but may cause health risks. The US Department of Health and Human Services offers the public access to the Household Products Database, with consumer information on over 4,000 products based on information provided by the manufacturer through the material safety data sheet.

Surfactants lower the surface tension of water, allowing it to flow into smaller tiny cracks and crevices in soils, making removal easier. Alkaline chemicals break down known soils such as grease and mud. Acids break down soils such as lime scale, soap scum, and stains of mustard, coffee, tea, and alcoholic beverages. Some solvent-based products are flammable and some can dissolve paint and varnish. Disinfectants stop smell and stains caused by bacteria.

== Health & safety impacts ==
When multiple chemicals are applied to the same surface without full removal of the earlier substance, the chemicals may interact. This interaction may reduce the efficiency of the chemicals applied (such as a change in pH value caused by mixing alkalis and acids) and in some cases may even emit toxic fumes. An example of this is the mixing of ammonia-based cleaners (or acid-based cleaners) and bleach. This causes the production of chloramines that volatilize (become gaseous), causing acute inflammation of the lungs (toxic pneumonia), long-term respiratory damage, and potential death.

Residue from cleaning products and cleaning activity (dusting, vacuuming, sweeping) has been shown to worsen indoor air quality (IAQ) by redistributing particulate matter (dust, dirt, human skin cells, organic matter, animal dander, particles from combustion, fibers from insulation, pollen, and polycyclic aromatic hydrocarbons) to which gaseous or liquid particles can be adsorbed. The concentration of such particulate matter and chemical residual will highest immediately after cleaning, and will decrease over time depending upon levels of contaminants, air exchange rate, and other sources of chemical residual. Of most concern are the family of chemicals called VOCs such as formaldehyde, toluene, and limonene.

Volatile organic compounds (VOCs) are released from many household cleaning products such as disinfectants, polishes, floor waxes, air-freshening sprays, all-purpose cleaning sprays, and glass cleaner. These products have been shown to emit irritating vapors. VOCs tend to evaporate and then to be inhaled into the lungs or adsorbed by dust, which can also be inhaled. Aerosolized (spray) cleaning products are important risk factors and may aggravate symptoms of adult asthma, respiratory irritation, childhood asthma, wheeze, bronchitis, and allergy.

Other modes of exposure to potentially harmful household cleaning chemicals include absorption through the skin (dermis), accidental ingestion, and accidental splashing into the eyes. Products for the application and safe use of the chemicals are also available, such as nylon scrub sponges and rubber gloves. It is up to consumers to keep themselves safe while using these chemicals. Reading and understanding the labels is important.

Chemicals used for cleaning toilets, sinks, and bathtubs can find their way into sewage water and can often not be effectively removed or filtered.

There is a growing consumer and governmental interest in natural cleaning products and green cleaning methods. The use of nontoxic household chemicals is growing as consumers become more informed about the health effects of many household chemicals, and municipalities are having to deal with the expensive disposal of household hazardous waste (HHW).

== Examples ==
- Air freshener
- Ammonium hydroxide
- Bleach
- Conditioner
- Deodorant
- Detergent
- Disinfectant
- Drain cleaner
- Hard surface cleaner
- Insect repellent
- Soap
- Toilet rim block
- Body wash

== See also ==
- Carbon footprint
- Wastewater
- Environmental chemistry
