= Vim (cleaning product) =

Household cleaning product

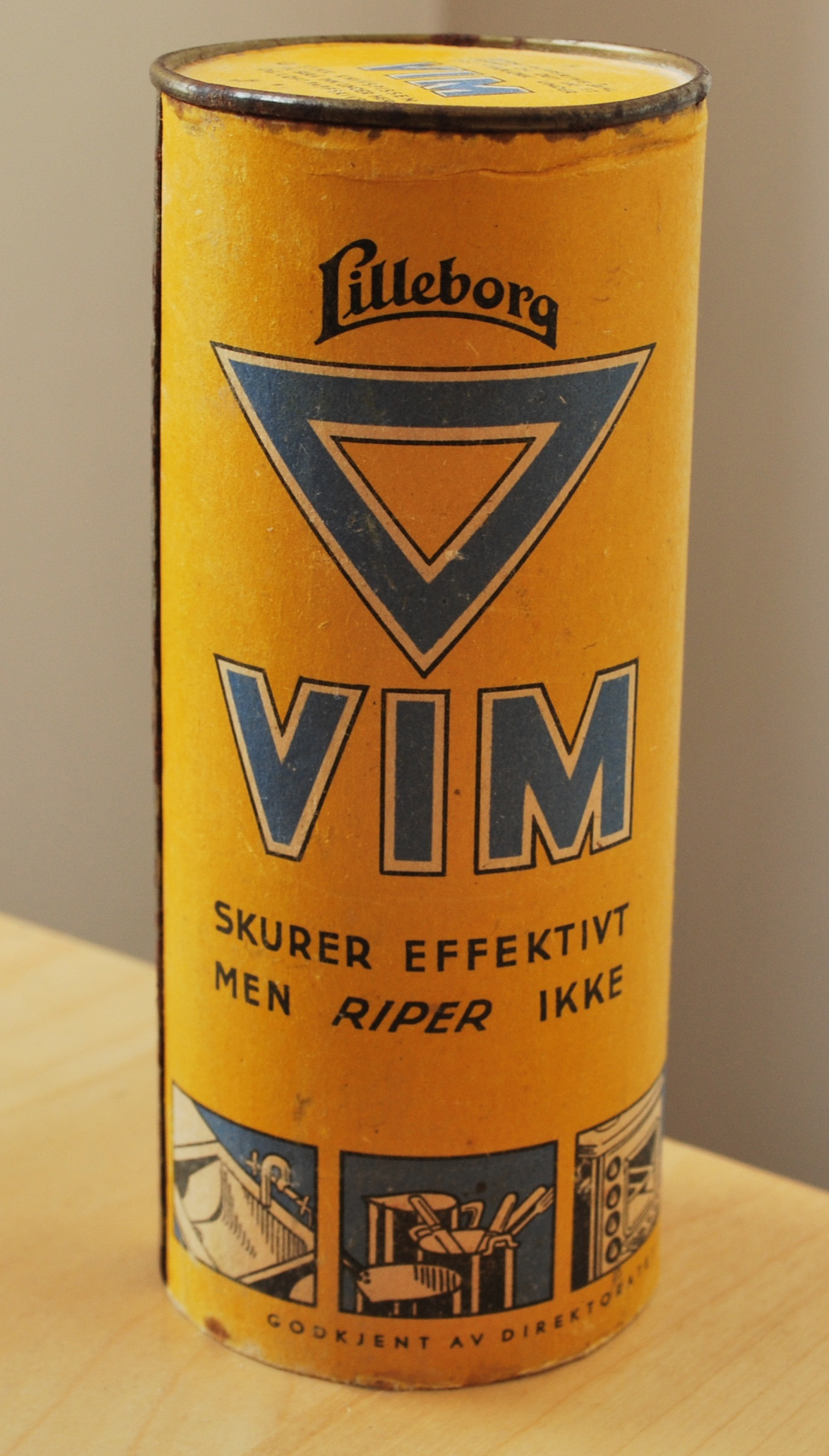
Can of VIM scouring powder from Norway. (2010)

Vim is the name of a range of household cleaning products originally produced by Lever Brothers (later Unilever). The Vim brand is currently owned by the German multinational company Henkel, while Unilever retains ownership in Canada and Vietnam.

== History ==
Vim scouring powder, one of the first products created by William Lever, first appeared on the market in 1904, an offshoot of Monkey Brand scouring soap. The name is thought to derive from the colloquial English word "vim" which has the same meaning as the Latin vis, vim ("force", "vigour").

Vim was produced at Port Sunlight near Liverpool, England. The name Vim remained solely associated with the scouring powder until 1993, when a range of associated products were released. Vim was also the name of a detergent tablet manufactured by Lever Brothers, and sold in the United States during the 1960s. It was the sponsor of the sitcom on CBS, The Lucy Show, starring Lucille Ball.

Former owner Unilever abandoned Vim in favour of rival product Jif, although it was still sold in some other countries in Europe.

In December 2004, it was sold to the group Guaber, based in Italy. Vim is currently owned by Henkel Group after its acquisition of Spotless Group in 2015, although it is still marketed by Unilever in Canada and Sri Lanka, where it has a 90% market share. Vim is also sold as a Unilever brand in South Africa and India.

Unilever was criticised in 2012 for a claim that its Vim Power Pro product contained "98% natural ingredients", when assessment tests found the product to be mainly water but with petroleum-based chemicals accounting for a quarter of its contents. Unilever's contention that the inclusion of the water justified the claim was described as "greenwashing" by critics.

== See also ==
- Ajax, for many years the main competitor to Vim in the market in the United Kingdom
