= Bon Ami =

American scouring powder brand

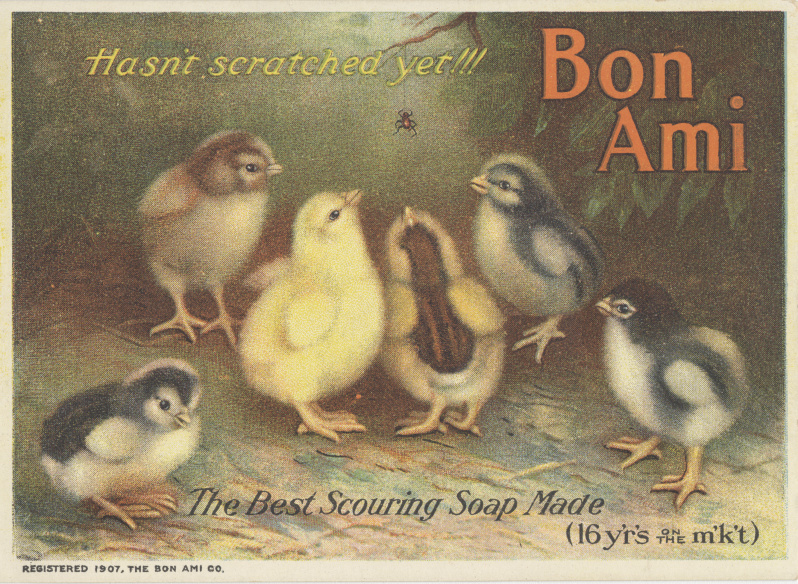
Advertisement featuring the "hasn't scratched yet" slogan, 1907

Bon Ami (French for "Good Friend") is an American scouring powder brand sold by the Bon Ami Company of Kansas City, Missouri. Since its inception in the late 19th century, the brand's advertising campaigns have gained particular notice.

== History ==
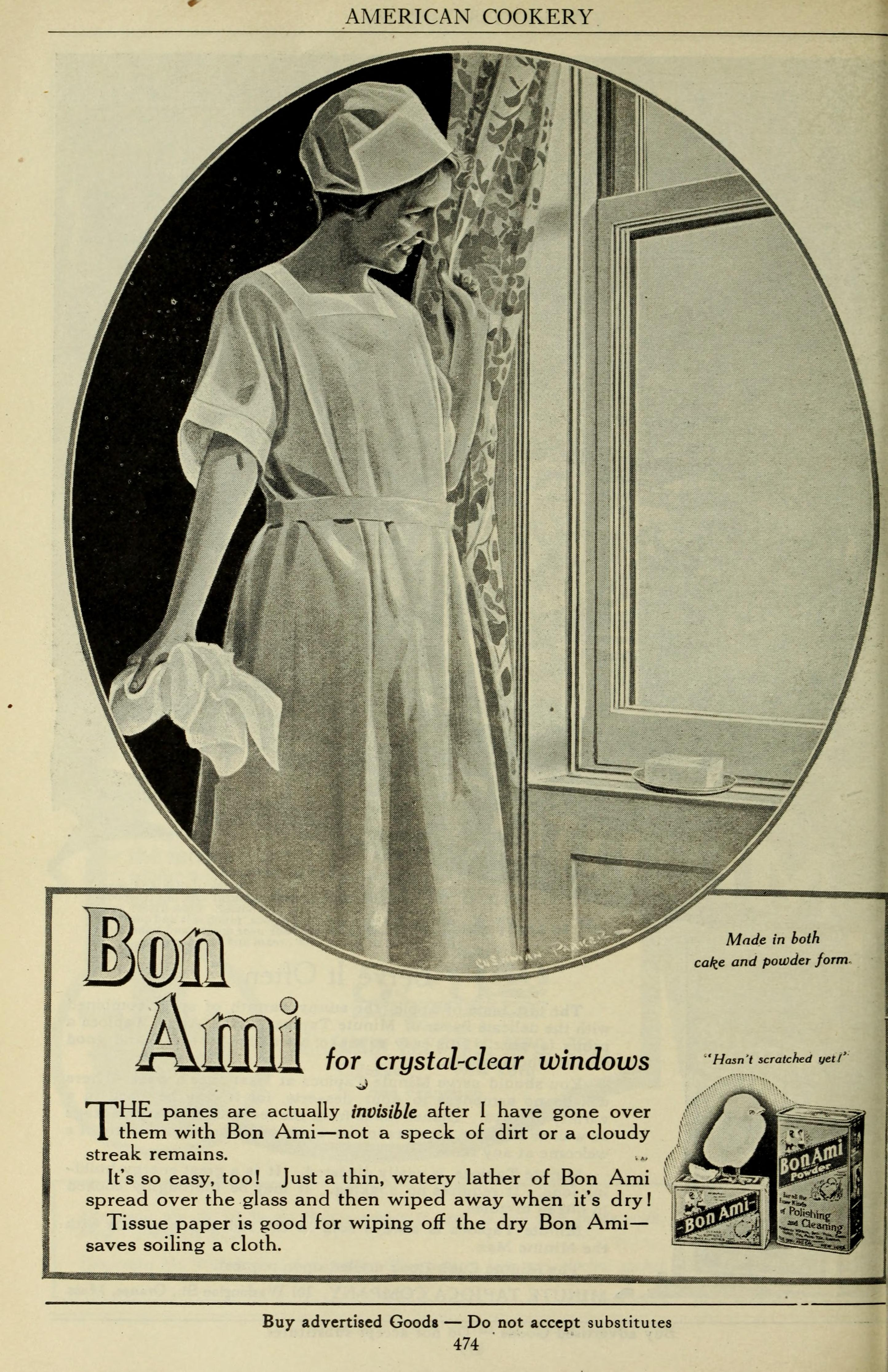
Advertisement in American Cookery, 1919

=== 19th century ===
The original Bon Ami formula was developed in 1886 by the J. T. Robertson Soap Company as a gentler alternative to quartz-based scouring powders available in stores. In those days, scouring powder was made from tallow and finely ground quartz. When quartz was mined, it was entwined with feldspar, and the two had to be separated by hand. The feldspar was discarded until Robertson discovered that this soft mineral could be combined with soap to create a less-abrasive product that would clean without scratching, resulting in the Bon Ami product.

Bon Ami was originally manufactured in a factory in Glastonbury, Connecticut, which later moved to Manchester in the 1880s.

As of 1896, Bon Ami was a common product in northeastern United States households. The slogan "hasn't scratched yet!" is an early American trademark.

=== 20th century ===
In the early 1900s, Alfred William Erickson, founder of McCann, revived the brand with full-color pages in leading women's magazines. He accepted Bon Ami as a client c. 1908. Artist Ben Austrian painted the prints, and Ben's wife served as the model in the ads. The campaign blossomed into literature with the release of The Chick That Never Grew Up, a work of children's literature featuring Princess Bon Ami.

In 1963, Lestoil purchased an approximately 60% stake in Bon Ami. Bon Ami merged into Lestoil in 1964, after protracted negotiations.

In 1971, Bon Ami was purchased by the Faultless Starch Company, which later changed the corporation name to Faultless Starch/Bon Ami Company to help reintroduce Bon Ami to the market.

In 1980, the company again revived its brand with a magazine campaign featuring the headline "never underestimate the cleaning power of a 94-year-old chick with a French name". During the first 6 months of the campaign, Bon Ami sales rose 12%. Nevertheless, its business was still flagging by 1983, when it remained in third place behind products from Procter & Gamble and Colgate-Palmolive.

=== 21st century ===
In 2011, Bon Ami celebrated its 125th anniversary by rereleasing the original cleaning cake for purchase. Limited supplies were offered both with and without a commemorative tin, celebrating the original formula's popularity.

== Ingredients ==
The product called "original" contains only feldspar. For other products, the Bon Ami website lists the following as main ingredients: feldspar, limestone, water, baking soda, citric acid, corn alcohol, epsom salts, essential oils, and xanthan gum.

== In popular culture ==
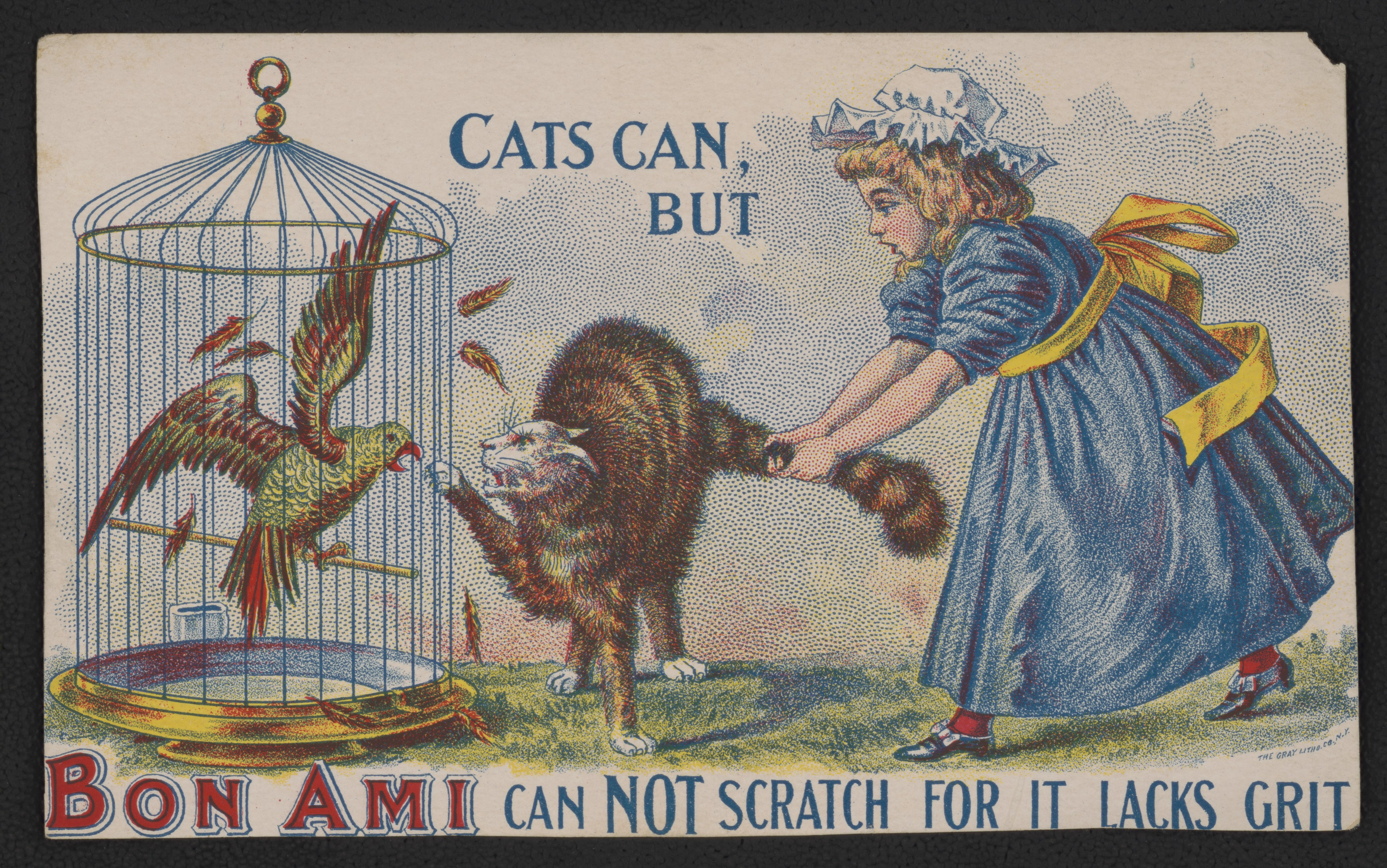
Bon Ami advertisement, 1890

In the F. Scott Fitzgerald novel Tender Is the Night, first published in 1934, Fitzgerald notes the routine of the character Dick Diver in cleaning up his workroom at his home outside Cannes: "He swept up, for no servants were allowed in there, treated his washroom sketchily with Bon Ami, repaired a screen and sent off an order to a publishing house in Zurich".

In the 1966 film The Ghost and Mr. Chicken, whenever discussing a murder at an old mansion, one character mentions that the police were unable to clean the blood off the organ keys, and another character adds, "And they used Bon Ami!" Lead actor Don Knotts personally got permission from the president of Bon Ami to include this reference to the company's product.

In the first volume of his autobiography, Isaac Asimov recalls a box his family kept in the bathroom when he was a child, and how in his childish naïveté he was impressed that the company was so conscientious that if they ever found that the powder had scratched, they would change the slogan to "Only Scratched Once!"

Jane Vandenburgh's novel Failure to Zigzag makes reference to Bon Ami's slogan "hasn't scratched yet".

== Sources ==
- Dorman, Evelyn S. (1994). "Bon Ami". In Jorgensen, Janice (ed.). Encyclopedia of Consumer Brands. Vol. 2. St. James Press. pp. 66–68. ISBN 9781558623378. OCLC 756196954.
- Woodward, A. (2003). "Faultless Starch/Bon Ami Company". In Grant, Tina (ed.). International Directory of Company Histories. Vol. 55. St. James Press. pp. 142–145. ISBN 9781558626966. OCLC 769044999.
