= Trichloroisocyanuric acid =

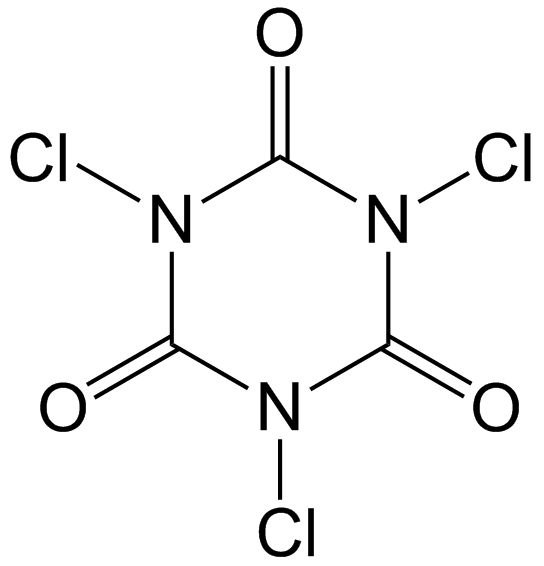

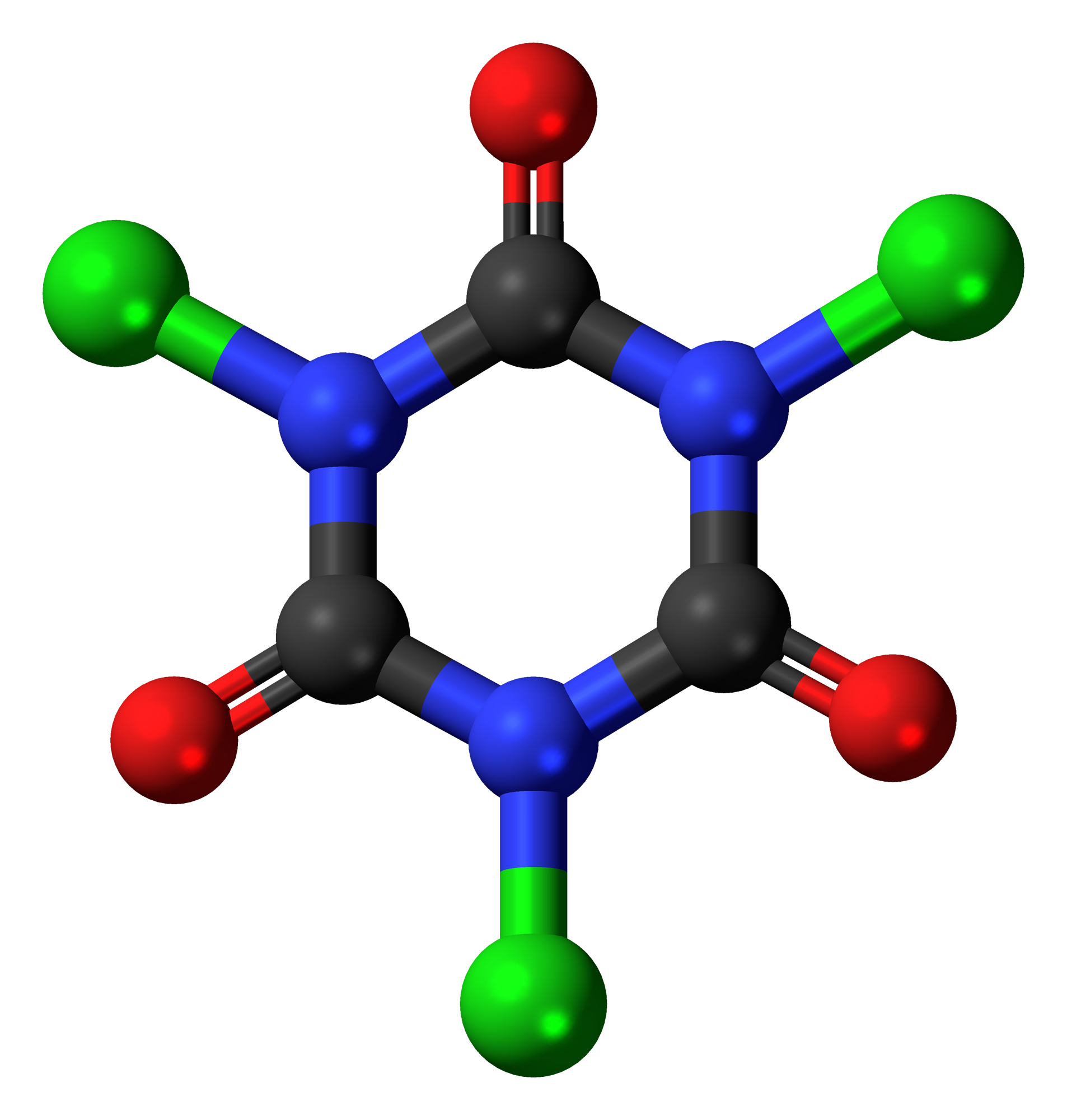

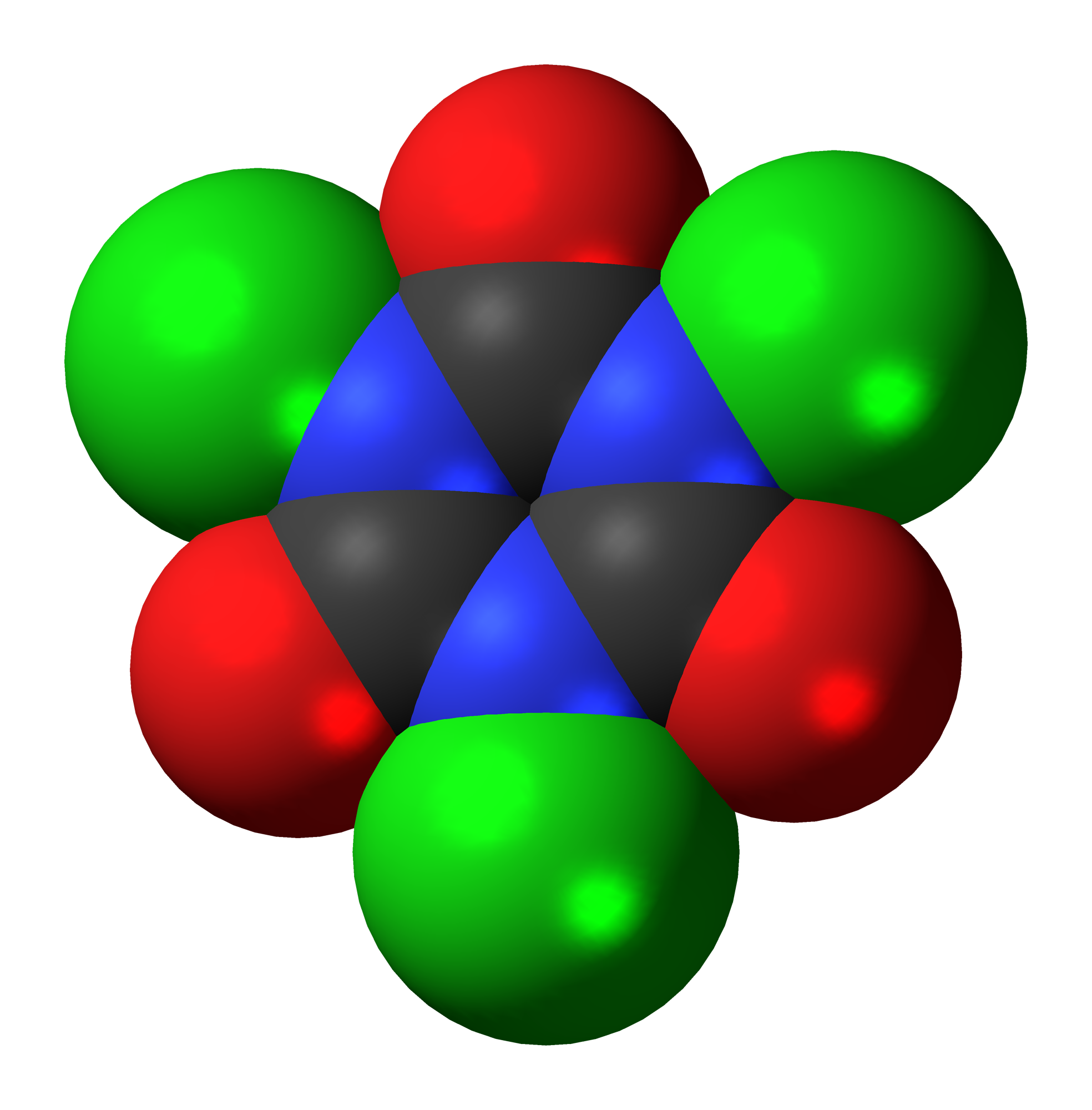
Symclosene

Names
- Preferred IUPAC name 1,3,5-Trichloro-1,3,5-triazinane-2,4,6-trione
- Other names: Trichlor; Isocyanuric chloride; 1,3,5-Trichloro-1,3,5-triazine-2,4,6(1H,3H,5H)-trione; Chloreal; Symclosene; Trichloro-s-triazinetrione; TCICA; TCCA

Identifiers
CAS Number	87-90-1
3D model (JSmol)	Interactive image
Beilstein Reference	202022
ChEBI	CHEBI:33015
ChEMBL	ChEMBL1698868
ChemSpider	6643
ECHA InfoCard	100.001.621
EC Number	201-782-8
Gmelin Reference	240759
KEGG	D05985
PubChem CID	6909
RTECS number	XZ1925000
UNII	RL3HK1I66B
UN number	2468
CompTox Dashboard (EPA)	DTXSID2026523
- InChI: InChI=1S/C3Cl3N3O3/c4-7-1(10)8(5)3(12)9(6)2(7)11 Key: YRIZYWQGELRKNT-UHFFFAOYSA-N; InChI=1/C3Cl3N3O3/c4-7-1(10)8(5)3(12)9(6)2(7)11 Key: YRIZYWQGELRKNT-UHFFFAOYAR
- SMILES: ClN1C(=O)N(Cl)C(=O)N(Cl)C1=O

Properties
Chemical formula	C_{3}Cl_{3}N_{3}O_{3}
Molar mass	232.40 g·mol^{−1}
Appearance	Colorless solid
Density	2.19 ± 0.1 g/cm^{3}
Melting point	246 to 247 °C (475 to 477 °F; 519 to 520 K)
Boiling point	decomposes
Solubility in water	1.2%
Solubility in other solvents	Soluble in chlorocarbons, acetone, and acetonitrile

Structure
Coordination geometry	planar
Dipole moment	0 D

Hazards
- Occupational safety and health (OHS/OSH)
Main hazards	lung irritant
- GHS labelling
Pictograms	(GHS03: Oxidizing) (GHS07: Exclamation mark) (GHS09: Environmental hazard) (GHS05: Corrosive)
Signal word	Danger
Hazard statements	H272, H302, H314, H319, H335, H410
Precautionary statements	P210, P220, P260, P264, P264+P265, P270, P271, P273, P280, P301+P317, P301+P330+P331, P302+P361+P354, P304+P340, P305+P351+P338, P316, P319, P321, P330, P337+P317, P363, P370+P378, P391, P403+P233, P405, P501
Flash point	NA

Related compounds
Related compounds	Cyanuric chloride Dichloroisocyanuric acid Tribromoisocyanuric acid
- Except where otherwise noted, data are given for materials in their standard state (at 25 °C [77 °F], 100 kPa). verify (what is ?) Infobox references

Trichloroisocyanuric acid is an organic compound with the formula (CONCl)_{3}. It is used as an industrial disinfectant, bleaching agent and a reagent in organic synthesis. This white crystalline powder, which has a strong "chlorine odour," is sometimes sold in tablet or granule form for domestic and industrial use.

== Synthesis ==
Trichloroisocyanuric acid is prepared from cyanuric acid via a reaction with chlorine gas and trisodium cyanurate.

== Applications ==
The compound is a disinfectant, algicide and bactericide mainly for swimming pools and dyestuffs, and is also used as a bleaching agent in the textile industry. It is widely used in civil sanitation for pools and spas, preventing and curing diseases in animal husbandry and fisheries, fruit and vegetable preservation, wastewater treatment, as an algicide for recycled water in industry and air conditioning, in anti shrink treatment for woolens, for treating seeds and in organic chemical synthesis. It is used in chemical synthesis as an easy to store and transport chlorine gas source, it is not subject to hazardous gas shipping restrictions, and its reaction with hydrochloric acid produces relatively pure chlorine.

Trichloroisocyanuric acid as used in swimming pools is easier to handle than chlorine gas. It dissolves slowly in water, but as it reacts, cyanuric acid concentration in the pool will build-up. In large bodies of water, the TCCA is soluble and breaks down slowly, releasing chlorine in the water to sanitize contaminants. When TCCA instead comes in contact with or is wetted/moistened by a small amount of water and does not dissolve, it can experience a chemical reaction, generating heat and causing the decomposition of the chemical, which in turn produces toxic chlorine gas and can produce explosive nitrogen trichloride.

== See also ==
- Comet (cleanser)
- Dichloroisocyanuric acid (Dichlor)
- Sodium dichloroisocyanurate
- Chlorine
