= SOS (disambiguation) =

SOS is the common name of the international Morse code distress signal.

SOS may also refer to:

== Arts, entertainment, and media ==
=== Films ===
- S.O.S. (1928 film), a 1928 British adventure film
- S.O.S. (1999 film), a 1999 Norwegian / Italian comedy
- S.O.S. – En segelsällskapsresa, a 1988 Swedish comedy
- Son of Sardaar, a 2012 Indian Hindi-language action-comedy film
- SOS: The San Onofre Syndrome, 2023 film

=== Games ===
- SOS (arcade game), a 1979 shoot 'em up arcade game by Namco
- SOS (1993 video game), a 1993 SNES video game
- SOS: The Final Escape or Disaster Report, a 2002 PS2 video game
- SOS (paper-and-pencil game), a more complicated version of tic-tac-toe

=== Literature ===
- "SOS" (short story), a 1933 short story by Agatha Christie
- Sos the Rope, a 1968 novel by Piers Anthony
- S.O.S. (novel), a 2001 novel by Joseph Connolly
- "SOS", a 2003 short story manga collection by Hinako Ashihara

=== Music ===
==== Groups and labels ====
- SOS (Indonesian group), an Indonesian girl group active from 2012–2016
- SOS (Turkish Cypriot band), a Turkish Cypriot rock band active since 1987
- SOS (Filipino alternative band), an alternative rock band from the Philippines
- SOS, a British band founded by Bernie Marsden
- Sisters of Shu, Dee Shu and Barbie Shu
- Swing Out Sister, a UK band active since the 1980s
- Symphony of Soul, the band of Bowie State University in Maryland, US
- The S.O.S. Band, an American R&B and electro-funk band active since 1977
- SOS Records, a punk rock record label

==== Albums ====
- SOS (Millencolin album), 2019
- S.O.S (Morgana Lefay album), 2000
- S.O.S. (S.O.S. Band album), 1980
- SOS (SZA album), 2022
- S.O.S., by La Bouche, or its title song, 1998
- S.O.S.: Save Our Soul, by Mark Broussard, 2007
- $O$, by Die Antwoord, 2022

==== Songs ====
===== SOS =====
- "SOS" (ABBA song), 1975
- "SOS" (Avicii song), 2019
- "SOS" (Rihanna song), 2006
- "SOS", by Dethklok from Dethalbum IV, 2023
- "SOS", by Elena Patroklou, Cyprus' entry in the 1991 Eurovision Song Contest, 1991
- "SOS", by Fifty Fifty from Love Tune, 2024
- "S.O.S.", by Go West from their self-titled album
- "SOS", by Max from Colour Vision (album), 2020
- "SOS", by Papa Roach from The Paramour Sessions, 2006
- "SOS", by Sekai no Owari from Eye, 2019
- "SOS", by Take That from Progress, 2010
- "SOS", by Aitch from 4, 2025

===== S.O.S or S.O.S. =====
- "S.O.S." (ABC song), 1984
- "S.O.S" (Indila song), 2014
- "S.O.S" (Jonas Brothers song), 2007
- "S.O.S." (Pink Lady song), 1976
- "S.O.S." (Ola song), 2007
- "S.O.S.", by August Burns Red from Season of Surrender, 2026
- "S.O.S.", by The Breeders from Last Splash, 1993
- "S.O.S.", by Chroma Key from Dead Air for Radios, 1998
- "S.O.S.", by Collie Buddz from WWE The Music, Vol. 8, 2008
- "S.O.S.", by Earl Greyhound from Soft Targets, 2006
- "S.O.S.", by Good Charlotte from The Chronicles of Life and Death, 2004
- "S.O.S.", by Gotthard from Firebirth, 2012
- "S.O.S.", by Hayley Kiyoko from Panorama, 2022
- "S.O.S.", by Jerry Cantrell from Degradation Trip Volumes 1 & 2, 2002
- "S.O.S.", by La Bouche from A Moment of Love, 1999
- "S.O.S.", by Stratovarius from Destiny, 1998
- "S.O.S.", by The Suicide Machines from Destruction by Definition, 1996
- "S.O.S. (Let the Music Play)", by Jordin Sparks, 2009
- "S.O.S. (Smile on Smile)", by Kis-My-Ft2, 2013
- "S.O.S. (Too Bad)", by Aerosmith, 1974
- "S.O.S. (The Tiger Took My Family)", by Dr. Bombay, 1998
- "(Sending Out An) S.O.S." by Retta Young, 1975
- "Same Ol' Situation (S.O.S.)", by Mötley Crüe, 1989
- "Stop Her on Sight (S.O.S.)" by Edwin Starr, 1966
- "S.O.S. (Anything But Love)", by Apocalyptica from Worlds Collide, 2007

=== Television ===
- S.O.S. (Agents of S.H.I.E.L.D.), a 2015 episode and season 2 finale
- "S.O.S. (Lost)", a 2006 episode of the second season
- "SOS (Save Our Show)", a 2021 episode of the web series Battle for Dream Island
- S.O.S.: Sexo y otros secretos, a 2007 Mexican TV series
- "S.O.S", a segment of the 2017 Thai TV series Project S: The Series
- S.O.S.: Stories of Survival, Philippine television program
- Satanische Omroep Stichting, a Dutch pirate television station

== Food ==
- S.O.S. (appetizer), Swedish
- "Shit On a Shingle", US military slang for chipped beef on toast

== Government and military ==
- Secretary of state
- Services of Supply, a branch of the US Army
- Special Operations Squadron, US Air Force units
- Squadron Officer School, a US Air Force leadership school
- State Defense Guard (Czechoslovakia), 1918–1936

== Organizations ==
- Boat People SOS, a Vietnamese-American association
- Samaritans of Singapore, a suicide prevention centre
- Save Outdoor Sculpture!, a program of Heritage Preservation from 1989–1999
- Secular Organizations for Sobriety, an addiction recovery program
- Share Our Strength, a US hunger relief organization
- SOS Children's Villages, an organization that maintains housing and services for children without stable parental care
- SOS Sahel Ethiopia, a non-governmental organization in Ethiopia working on rural development
- Stop Our Ship (SOS), an antiwar movement during the Vietnam War

== People ==
- Bill Sayer (1934–1989), an English rugby league player nicknamed Sos
- sOs (gamer), a StarCraft II esports player
- Shaun Marsh (born 1983), an Australian cricketer nicknamed SOS (Son of Swampy)
- Sós, a surname
- Stephen Silvagni (born 1967), an Australian football player nicknamed SOS

== Places ==
- Sos, Nagorno-Karabakh, Azerbaijan, a village in Khojavend District
- Sos, Lot-et-Garonne, France, a commune in southern France
- Sos del Rey Católico, Aragon, Spain, a town in Zaragoza Province

== Science, technology, and mathematics ==
=== Biology and medicine ===
- Si opus sit, use medicine if needed
- Sinusoidal obstruction syndrome, a medical condition
- Son of Sevenless, a type of gene
- SOS response, a DNA repair system

=== Computing ===
- Apple SOS, an operating system
- Science On a Sphere, a display system
- Secure Our Smartphones, a New York State and San Francisco initiative
- Sensor Observation Service, a standardized web service (OGC)
- Scrum of scrums, in software development
- SHARE Operating System, IBM
- Silicon on sapphire, a circuit-manufacturing process
- Son of sysreport, in Linux; see Red Hat § Utilities and tools
- Structural operational semantics, in computer programming

=== Mathematics ===
- Polynomial SOS, decomposing into a sum of squares
- Special ordered set, in optimization
- Sum of squares (disambiguation), in mathematics

=== Other uses in science and technology ===
- Science On a Sphere, a display system
- Special ordered set, in optimization
- System of systems, in systems engineering

== Sport ==
- Side out scoring, a competition where a team can only earn points when serving
- Strength of schedule, a competitor rating statistic
- Survival of the Shawangunks, a triathlon held in New Paltz, New York

== Other uses ==
- Södersjukhuset, a hospital in Stockholm, Sweden
- Somali shilling (ISO 4217 code: SOS), currency of Somalia
- SOS incident, several missing person incidents in Hokkaidō, Japan in the 1980s
- S.O.S Soap Pads

== See also ==
- SoS (disambiguation)
