= Wool (disambiguation) =

Wool is the textile fibre obtained from sheep.

Wool may also refer to:

== Organic matter ==
- Alpaca wool, derived from fur of alpacas
- Angora wool, derived from fur of rabbits
- Cashmere wool, derived from fur of goats
- Cotton wool, a British term for a fibrous mass of surgical cotton
- Llama wool, derived from fur of llamas
- Wool, the commonly used term in the UK for woollen knitting yarn

== Non-organic matter ==
- Bronze wool, an abrasive derived from bronze
- Glass wool, an insulating material derived from fiberglass
- High temperature insulation wool, an insulating material derived from ceramic fibers
- Mineral wool, an insulating material derived from minerals or metal oxides
- Steel wool, an abrasive derived from steel

== People ==
- Wool (surname)

== Other uses ==
- Wool, the first book in the Silo series of science fiction novels by Hugh Howey
- Wool, Dorset, a village in England
- Wool (band), a rock band from Washington, D.C.
- WOOL-FM, a radio station in Vermont, United States

== See also ==
- British Wool Marketing Board
- Bob Woolmer, English cricketer whose nickname is Woollie
- Woolly, British slang for a sweater
- Worshipful Company of Woolmen
