= Wire wool =

Entwined filament pads or rolled belts

Wire wool is a generic term for products made of filaments entwined, woven or otherwise agglomerated into a sort of felt pad or belt that is often rolled for convenience. Typical dimensions for most domestic wire-wool might be about 1 cm/¼" thick by 8cm/3" broad and cut to various lengths.

Although "wire wool" and "steel wool" have become almost synonymous in general use, in engineering terms this is a misnomer as other metals, plastics and even natural fibers such as bristles may be incorporated singly or in combination within the wire-wool mesh according to purpose.

Most wire–wool products are intended for cleaning and polishing, but some are also occasionally used for binding, as a scaffolding, for casting or molding stabilization. Most common varieties of wire-wool are:

- Steel wool is generally made of low-grade carbon steel extruded wire but also synthetic steel wool contains steel filaments that have been deliberately modified in profile or chemistry for some specific application. Unlike earlier designs that tended to oxidize modern products tend to be "rustless"
- Lead wool (Pb) which can be packed into joints of rigid tubing to make a tight and slightly flexible joint especially suitable for wet or underwater conduits
- Copper wool (Cu) used where steel is too coarse
- Bronze wool filaments are less likely to break and so used for finishing and polishing with less risk of scratching.
- Brass wool (Cu+Zn) is used where copper wool is too harsh including glass grinding, bright metal and fine marquetry
- Aluminum wool (Al) is for heat shielding, sound damping specialist insulation as well as final air filtration for clean rooms and operating theatres.

== See also ==
- Abrasive
- Air filtration in operating rooms
- HEPA high-efficiency particulate air filtration
- Polishing (metalworking)
- Scouring pad
- Scrubber
- Surface finishing
