= Scotch-Brite =

Abrasive product line by 3M

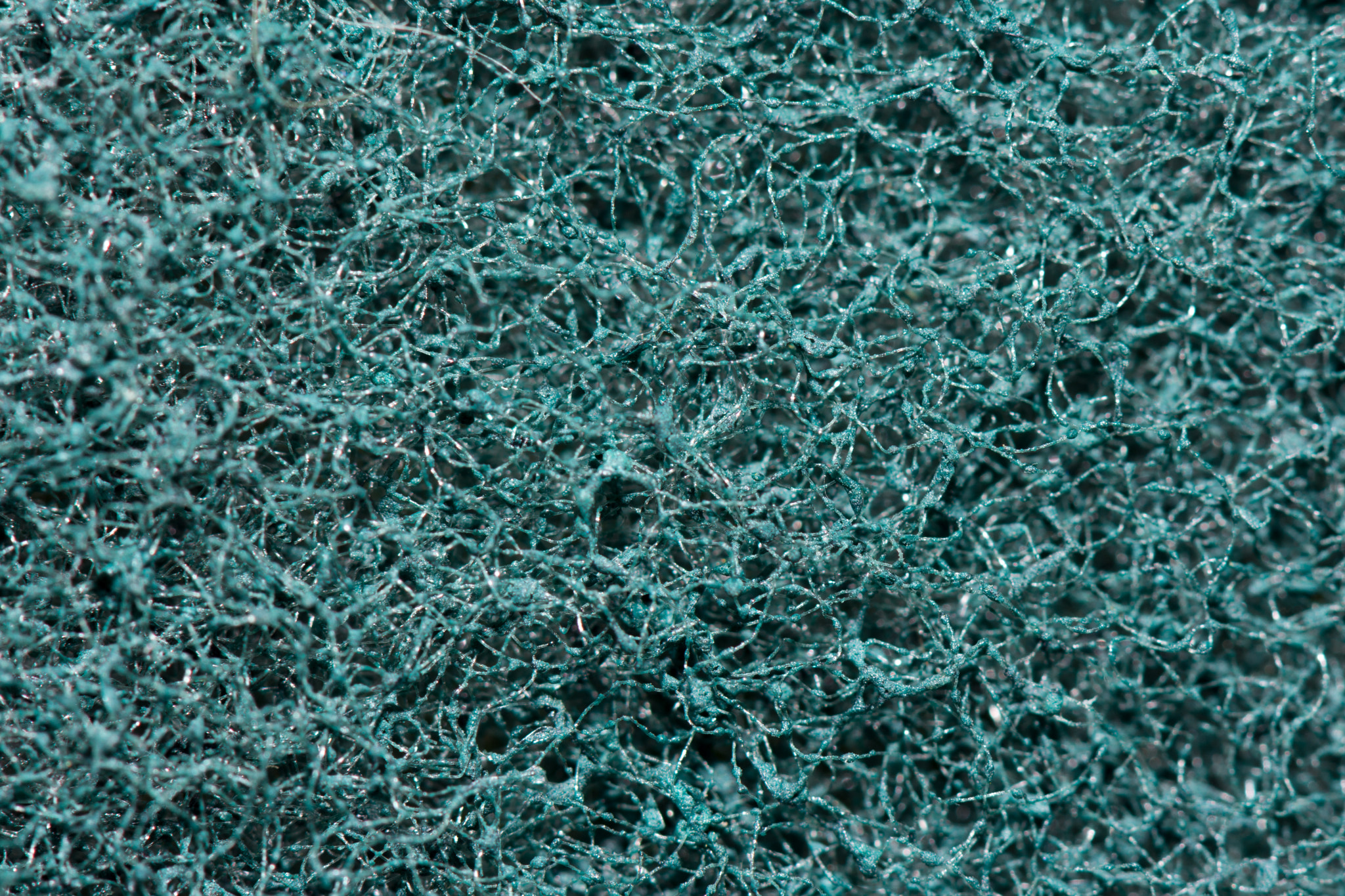
- Product type: Scouring pads, Dobie pads, industrial abrasive products
- Current owner: 3M
- Country: United States
- Introduced: 1950s

Scotch-Brite is a line of abrasive products produced by 3M. The product line includes scouring pads and tools for home uses such as dish washing and scrubbing, as well as various types of surfaces for industrial applications, such as discs, belts, and rotating brushes, with varying compositions and levels of hardness.

Scotch-Brite, and similar abrasives, have largely replaced the use of bronze wool, which had been used as a non-rusting alternative to steel wool, for use on materials such as oak that would be sensitive to rust.

== Structure ==
The structure of Scotch-Brite pads is created by a sparse unwoven polymer such as cellulose, nylon or spun polypropylene fiber. Products use several variations of hardening and abrasive materials, such as aluminium oxide (alumina), titanium dioxide and resins. Although the base polymers may be considered benignly soft, the composition with other materials greatly enhances their abrasive powers; to the extent that a heavy-duty Scotch-Brite pad (which contains both aluminum oxide and titanium dioxide) will scratch glass.

== History ==
Alvin W. Boese was born in St. Paul, Minnesota on March 24, 1910. In 1925 Boese dropped out of high school and worked as a bell hop and drug store clerk before joining 3M as an office boy in 1930. He moved to the laboratory as a helper in 1933, and in 1939 he volunteered to assist in developing a noncorrosive backing for electrical tape. This assignment was the start of Boese's career in the research, development, and marketing of 3M nonwoven fiber products.

In 1938, Alvin W. Boese conducted experiments to discover how to bind a mass of fibers together without weaving them.

In the 1950s, Al Boese bonded nonwoven materials, to abrasive compounds such as Aluminium oxide and Titanium oxide, to make Scotch-Brite pads.

In 1953 Boese became technical director of 3M's ribbon laboratories and in 1958 he was promoted to general manufacturing manager of the gift wrap and fabric division. In June 1968 Boese was promoted to nonwoven products manager and a month later he was appointed as a research associate in 3M's new business ventures division.

== Other products ==
Dobie pads are white polyester mesh, wrapped around an absorbent urethane sponge, woven/knitted/crocheted non-scratch scrub covering which does not remove non-stick coatings, like teflon, from surfaces.
