= SOS2 =

SOS2 may refer to:

- Son of Sevenless, a set of encoding genes
- Special ordered set of type 2, a structure in discrete optimization
