= Lake Mohonk Conference on International Arbitration =

Conferences held in New York state, between 1895 and 1916

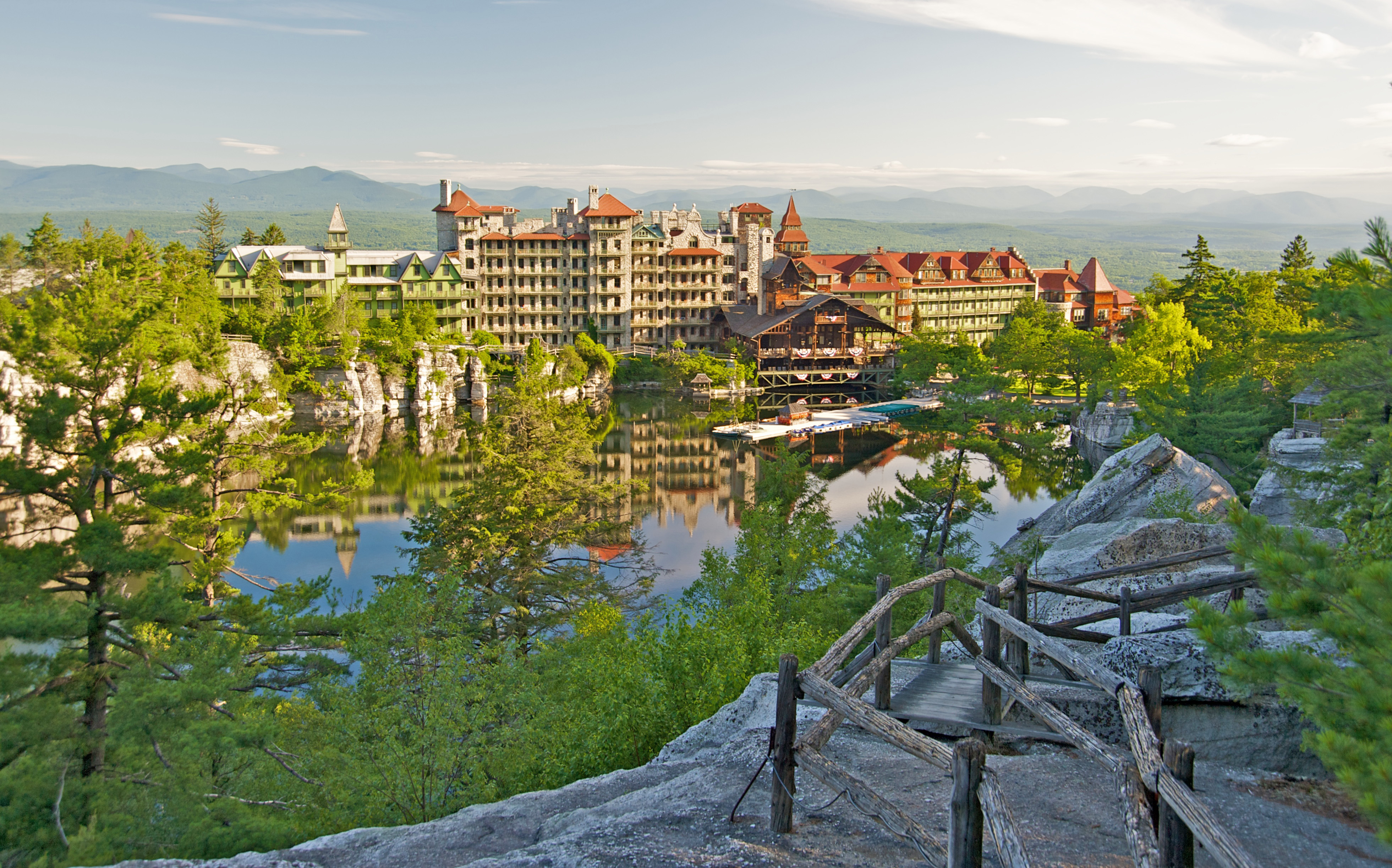
Mohonk Mountain House, a resort hotel located on the Shawangunk Ridge

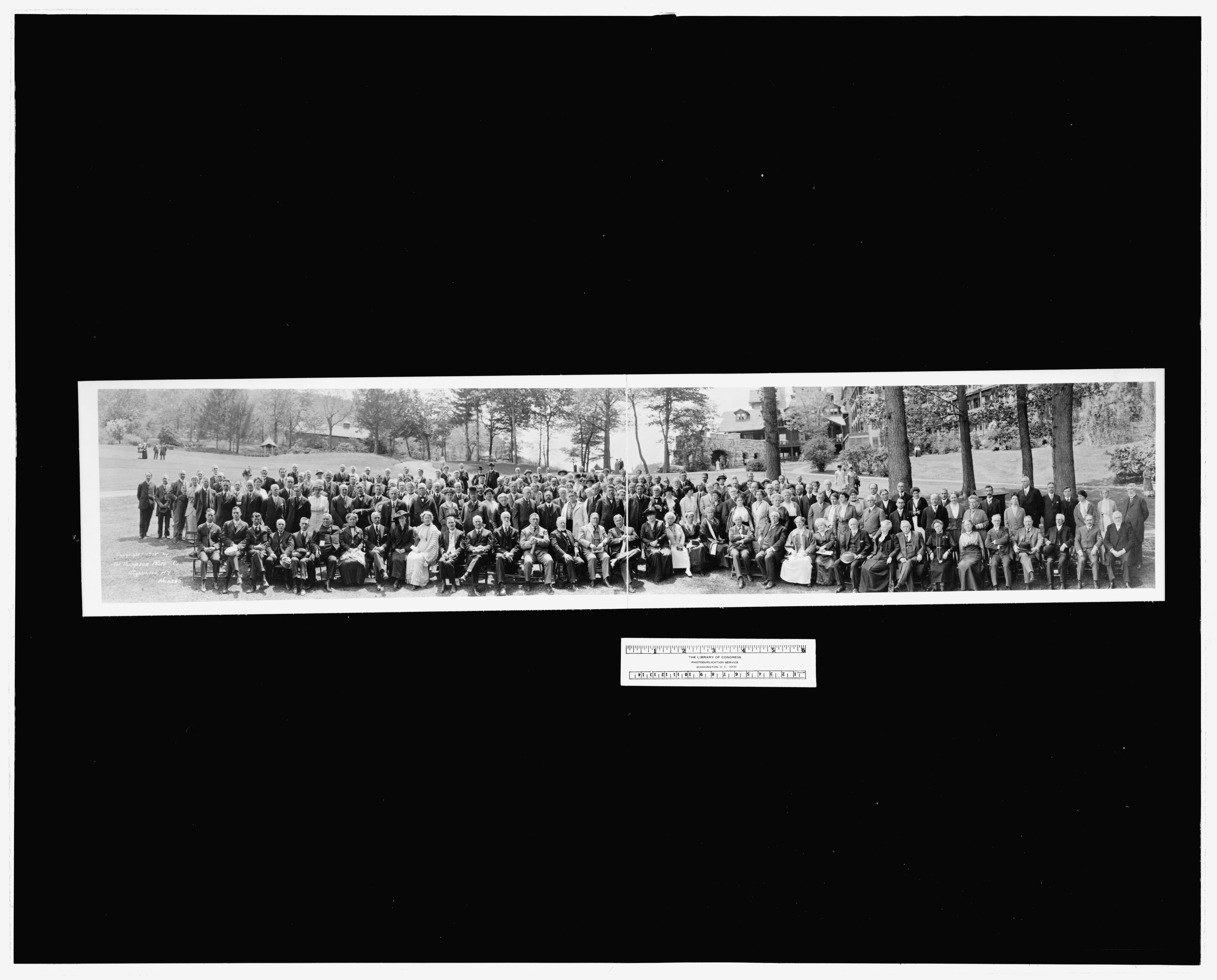
1915 Conference

The Lake Mohonk Conference on International Arbitration was founded in 1895 to support the cause of international arbitration, arbitration treaties, and an international court, and to generate public support on behalf of the cause. These meetings, which took place between 1895 and 1916, were instrumental in the creation of the Permanent Court of Arbitration in The Hague, Netherlands.

The first Lake Mohonk Conference on International Arbitration was held in June 1895 at Lake Mohonk in Ulster County in the U.S. state of New York. Fifty individuals selected by Albert K. Smiley, a Quaker and the owner of the Mohonk Mountain House, one of the most prestigious summer resorts of the day, convened at the initial sessions at the resort. The annual conferences soon grew to attract 300 leaders of government, business, religion, the press, and education. It was one of the stops of `Abdu'l-Bahá's journeys to the West. After Albert Smiley's death in December 1912, his place as host of the Conferences was taken by his half-brother, Daniel Smiley. The last conference was held in 1916. Plans for a 1917 conference were made, but it was never held, partly due to World War I.

The conference papers were later donated by the Smiley Family to Swarthmore College for study and research.
