= Mohonk Mountain House =

Resort hotel in the Catskill Mountains

- Lake Mohonk Mountain House
- U.S. National Register of Historic Places
- U.S. National Historic Landmark
- New York State Register of Historic Places
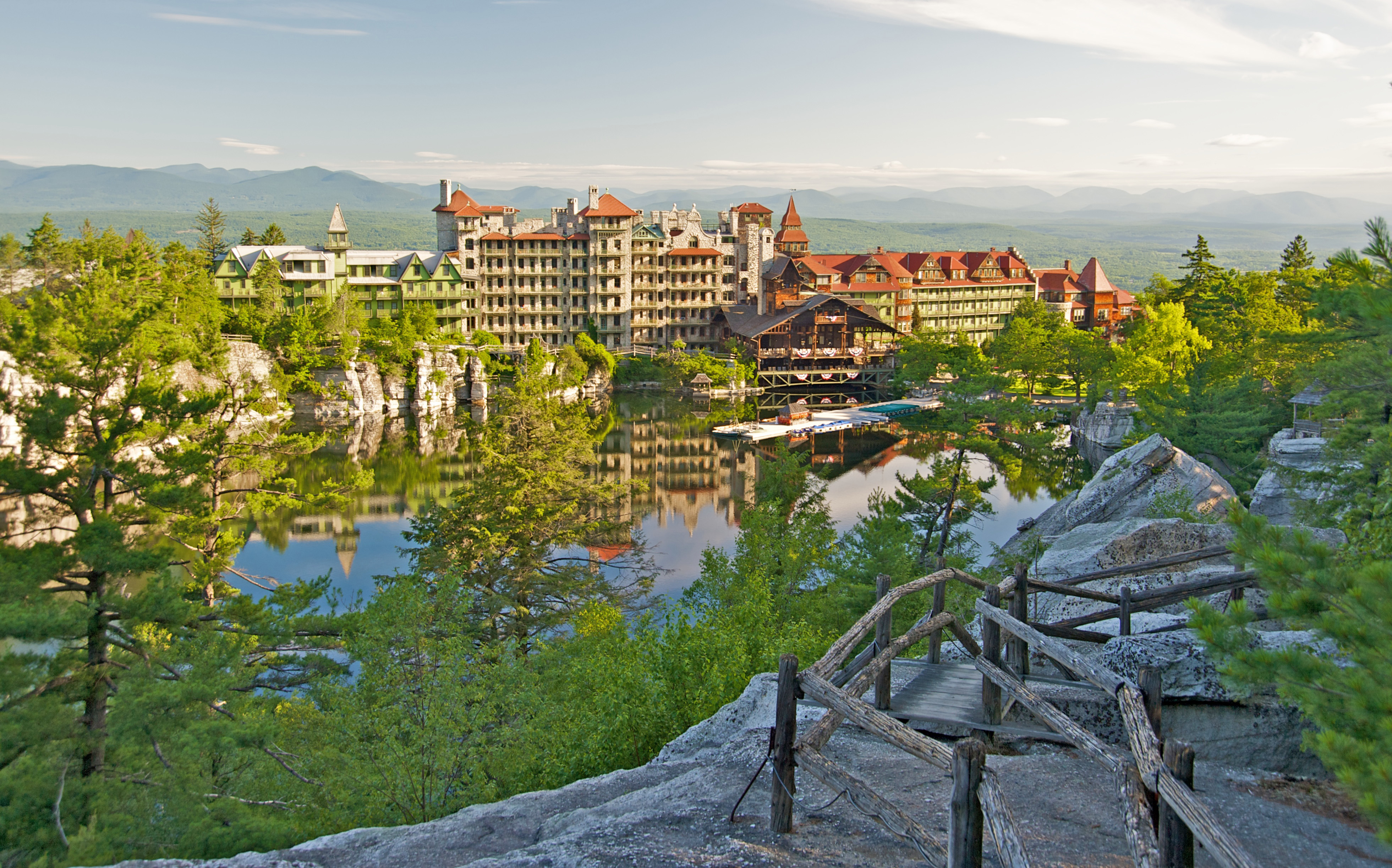
- Mohonk Mountain House

- Location within New York Location within the United States
- Location: New Paltz, New York
- Coordinates: 41°46′07″N 74°09′20″W
- Built: 1869–1910
- Architect: Napoleon Le Brun; James E. Ware
- Website: mohonk.com
- NRHP reference No.: 73001280
- NYSRHP No.: 11108.000020

Significant dates
- Added to NRHP: July 16, 1973
- Designated NHL: June 24, 1986
- Designated NYSRHP: June 23, 1980

The Mohonk Mountain House, also known as Lake Mohonk Mountain House or simply Lake Mohonk, is a resort hotel located south of the Catskill Mountains on the crest of the Shawangunk Ridge in New York. The property lies at the junction of the towns of New Paltz, Marbletown, and Rochester.

== History ==
The National Historic Landmark Program's "Statement of Significance", as of the site's historic landmark designation in 1986, said:

Begun in the 1870s as a small resort for family and friends by the Smiley brothers, it became so popular that it was enlarged many times. Because of the Smileys' love of the outdoor life, the area around the hotel was treated as an integral part of the attractions of the resort. Much of this area was planned as an experiment in conservation of the natural environment and as an educational tool for studying botany, geology, and outdoor living.

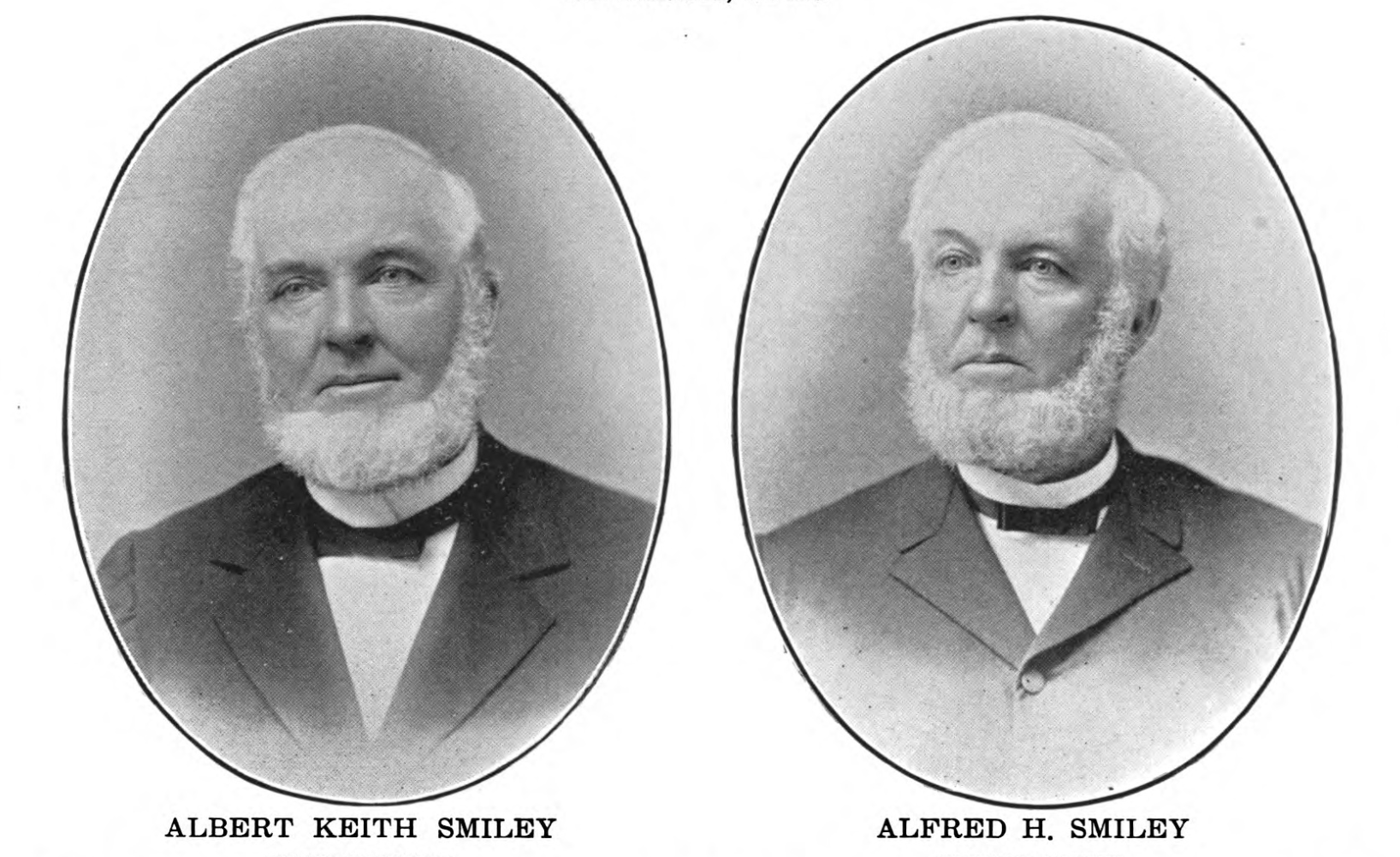
Albert Keith Smiley and Alfred H. Smiley (c. 1901)

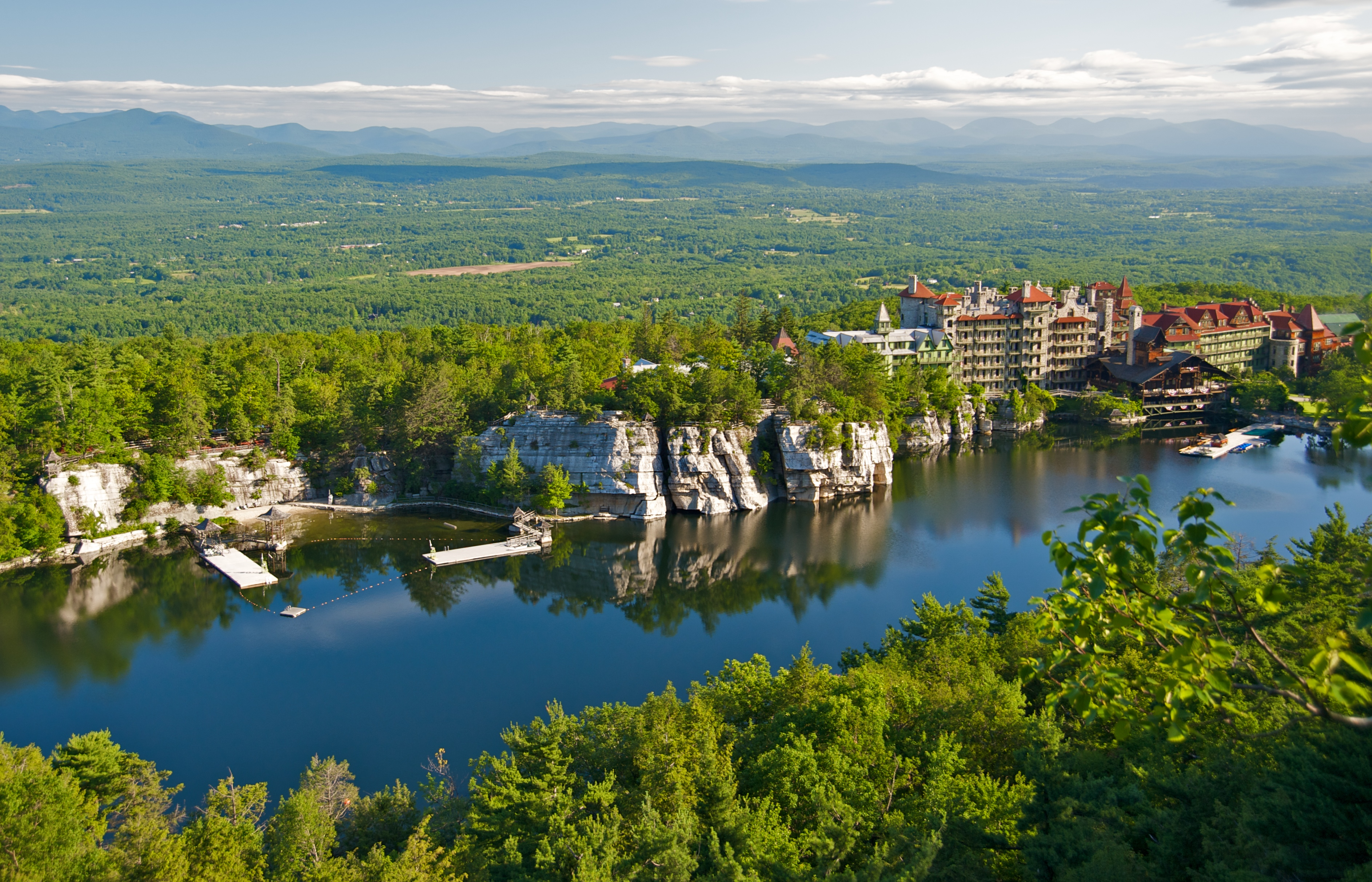
Lake Mohonk

The resort is located on the shore of Lake Mohonk, which is half a mile (800 m) long and 60 feet (18 m) deep. The main structure was built by Quaker twin brothers Albert and Alfred Smiley between 1869 and 1910.

From 1883 to 1916, annual conferences took place at Mohonk Mountain House, sponsored by Albert Smiley, to improve the living standards of Native American Indian populations. The meetings brought together government representatives of the Bureau of Indian Affairs and the House and Senate committees on Indian Affairs, as well as educators, philanthropists, and Indian leaders to discuss the formulation of policy. The Haverford College library in Haverford, Pennsylvania holds 22,000 records from the 34 conference reports for researchers and students of American history. The hotel hosted the Lake Mohonk Conference on International Arbitration between 1895 and 1916, which was instrumental in creating the Permanent Court of Arbitration in The Hague, Netherlands. Those conference papers were donated by the Smiley Family to Swarthmore College for research.

The house was given a United Nations Environment Programme Award in 1994 in honor of "125 years of stewardship". According to the National Trust for Historic Preservation, "Through its buildings and roads, its land, and its spirit, Mohonk exemplifies America's history and culture. Mohonk has since managed to maintain its 19th century character into the 21st century." The resort was sued in 2014 by 200 guests who had become ill in a norovirus outbreak after staying there. They claimed that the owners had been aware of the gastrointestinal illness at the resort prior to the guests' arrival. The resort settled the claims for $875,000 two years later.

== Description ==
Mohonk Mountain House is a Victorian-style mountain castle that has 259 guest rooms, including 28 tower rooms, an indoor pool and spa, and an outdoor ice-skating rink for winter use. The property consists of 1,325 acres (536 ha), and much of it is landscaped with meadows and gardens. It adjoins the Mohonk Preserve, which is crisscrossed by 85 miles (140 km) of hiking trails and carriage roads. The Smileys conveyed the majority of their property to the preserve, in 1963. At the time the preserve was called the Mohonk Trust.

== Notable guests ==
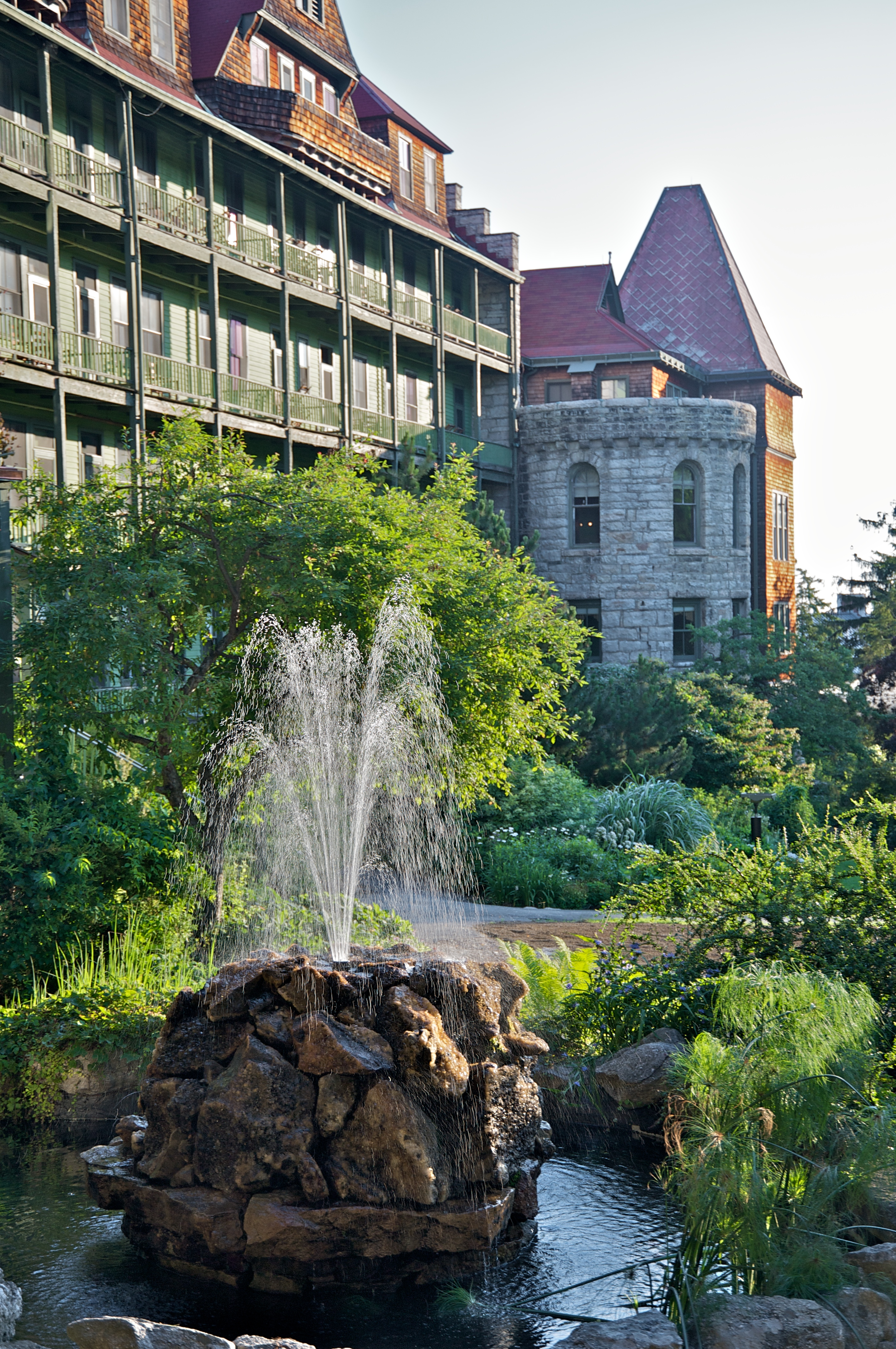
Water fountain

Mohonk Mountain House has hosted many famous visitors including industrialist John D. Rockefeller, financier Charles A. Schmutz, naturalist John Burroughs, industrialist Andrew Carnegie, prolific author Isaac Asimov, and presidents: Rutherford B. Hayes, Chester A. Arthur, Theodore Roosevelt, William Howard Taft, and Bill Clinton. Guests have also included actor Alan Alda, former First Lady Julia Grant, author Thomas Mann, and religious leaders like theologian Lyman Abbott, Rabbi Louis Finkelstein, Reverend Ralph W. Sockman, and Reverend Francis Edward Clark. `Abdu'l-Bahá, the eldest son of Baháʼí Faith founder Bahá'u'lláh, stayed there in 1912 during the Lake Mohonk Conference on International Arbitration during his journeys to the West. William James Roe II said the resort was a "palace of peace" after his stay there, writing an article of the same name, published in Harper's Young People. Actor Kevin Bacon has stayed at the resort. Dee Snider of Twisted Sister fame often enjoys vacations at Mohonk with his family.

Ada Louise Huxtable, an architectural critic for The New York Times, also visited the resort, calling it "unspoiled" and praising its ability to capture the picturesque and sublime. She singled out the Lake Parlor and Lake Lounge as being "notably good".

== In popular culture ==
The stone gatehouse appeared in the 1985 film The Stuff. The resort was the filming location of the film The Road to Wellville (1994), starring Anthony Hopkins and Matthew Broderick. The resort is mentioned in the 22nd episode of the eighth season of Blue Bloods.

Scenes from the Amazon Prime Video television series Upload were filmed at the resort. The resort was featured in the second episode of the fifth season of Billions. The resort was featured in the "Hudson Valley, N.Y." episode of Anthony Bourdain: No Reservations in 2010. In the Stephen King novel The Regulators, the resort plays a minor role as a place fondly remembered by a protagonist. The epilogue is written as a typewritten letter on Mohonk stationery talking about some events at the resort.

== Awards ==
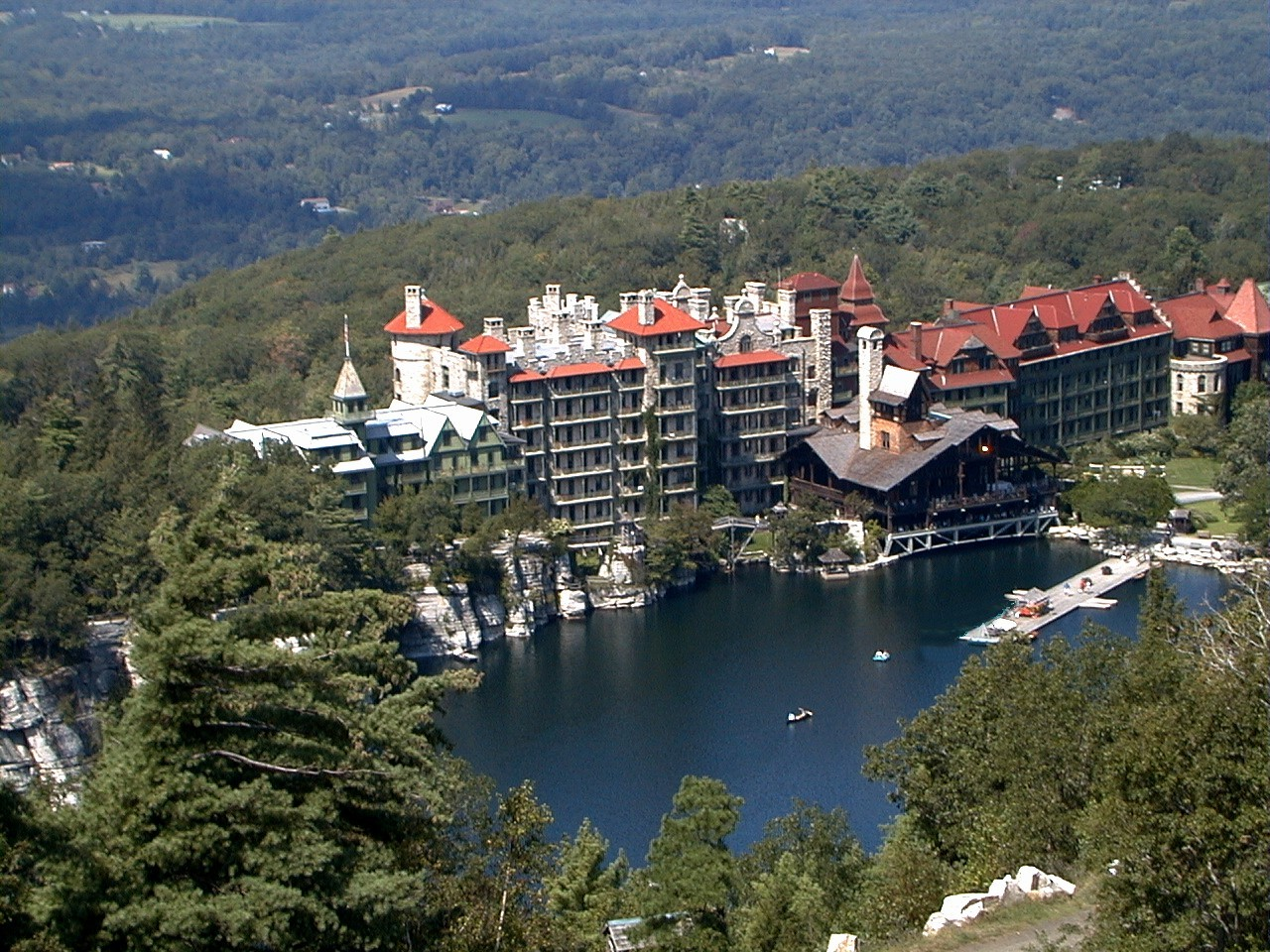
The hotel seen from Skytop observation tower

Condé Nast Traveler has given it nine awards since 2008, including "Number One Resort Spa in the United States" (2013). Travel + Leisure has given the resort seven awards since 2009, including "Number Two Hotel Spa in the United States" (2013) and "Number Six Hotel Spa in the World" (2013).

Fodor's listed it as one of "10 Best Spa Trips" for 2012, and in 2010 named it as one of 10 Best Hotels for Kids and Families. In 2011, Every Day with Rachael Ray listed Mohonk as one of "Our Eight Favorite Resorts". Mohonk Mountain House is a member of Historic Hotels of America, the official program of the National Trust for Historic Preservation. In July 2024, Americas Great Resorts added the hotel to its Top Picks as a landmark property.

== See also ==
- List of Historic Hotels of America
- Catskill Mountain House
- Overlook Mountain House
