= Brillo Pad =

Trade name for a scouring pad made from soap-filled steel wool

Brillo
- Product type: Scouring pad
- Current owner: Armaly Brands
- Country: United States
- Introduced: 1913
- Previous owners: Brillo Manufacturing Company (1913–1962); Purex Industries, Inc. (1962–1985); The Dial Corporation (1985–1997); Church & Dwight (1997–2010)
- Tagline: Now that's brilliant!
- Website: brillo.com

Brillo is a trade name for a scouring pad, used for cleaning dishes, and made from steel wool filled with soap. The concept was patented in 1913, at a time when aluminium pots and pans were replacing cast iron in the kitchen; the new cookware blackened easily. The company's website states the name Brillo is from the Latin word for "bright", although no such word exists in Latin. In Spanish the word brillo means the noun "shine"; however, German, Italian, French, and English do have words for "shine" or "bright" beginning with brill- deriving from Latin words for beryl.

== History ==
In the early 1900s, in New York, an unnamed cookware peddler and his brother-in-law, Theodore Ludwig, were working on a solution to clean blackened cookware. Using jewellers' rouge, with soap and fine steel wool from Germany, they developed a method to scour the backsides of cooking utensils when they began to blacken. The method worked and the peddler added this new product, soap with steel wool, into his line of goods for sale.

Demand for the steel wool, copper spun and soap with jewellers' rouge increased quickly. The peddler and the jeweller decided to patent the product. Because they lacked the money to pay for legal services, they offered New York attorney Milton Loeb an interest in their business. Loeb accepted and in 1913, he secured a patent for the product under the name Brillo. The partnership formed between the peddler, the jeweller and the attorney became known as the Brillo Manufacturing Company, with headquarters and production operations in New York City.

By 1917, the company was selling packaged boxes of six pads, with a cake of soap included. During World War I, it helped with needed efforts of field operations. In 1921, the company moved its production facility to London, Ohio. It was only in the 1930s that soap was contained within the pad.

The company merged with Purex Industries in 1962. The Dial Corporation acquired Purex Industries in 1985. Church and Dwight acquired the Brillo business from Dial in 1997.

In 2010, Armaly Brands of Walled Lake, Michigan, primarily a manufacturer of sponges, purchased the Brillo business from Church & Dwight. At that time there were about 50 employees, down from a high of about 150 in the 1990s.

== Production ==
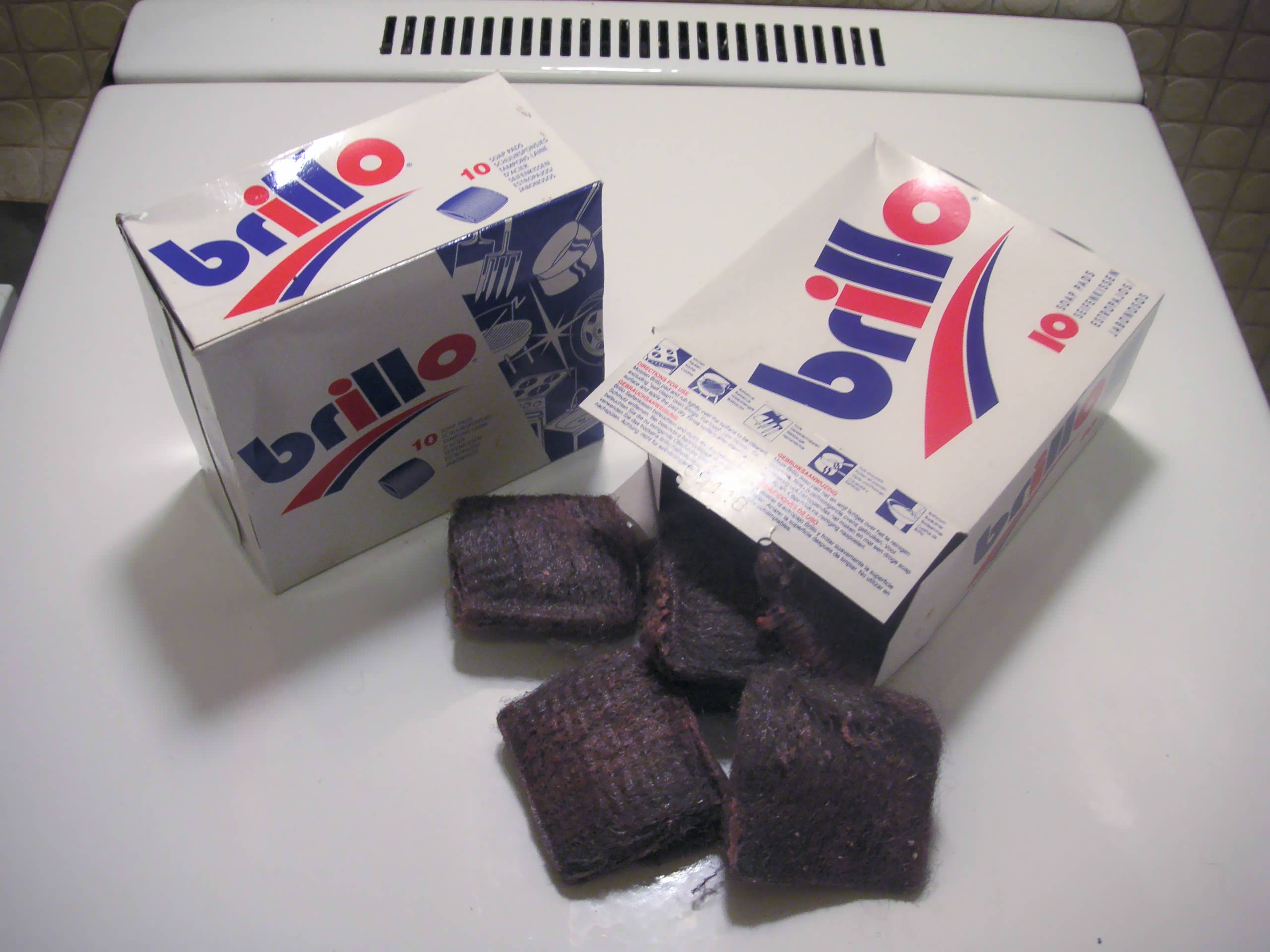
Brillo pads

Brillo is manufactured in London, Ohio.

== Brillo Basics ==
In December 2019, Innovative Brands, a division of International Wholesale, agreed to a licensing agreement with Armaly Brands to launch Brillo Basics, a line of household cleaning products.

== In art ==
The most famous use of Brillo in Pop Art is Andy Warhol's Brillo Boxes, which debuted in 1964 and reproduced the 1960s Brillo logo on sculptural box forms.

In 1970, Harlan Ellison and Ben Bova published a short story about a robot policeman titled "Brillo". The title was a pun by Bova as a robot policeman could be referred to as metal fuzz.

== See also ==
- S.O.S Soap Pad
