= After-rust =

After-rust is a form of rust which sometimes develops on a non-ferrous metal surface when that surface has been finished, deburred, or cleaned with a carbon steel brush or steel wool. It is caused by microscopic deposits of the steel which become embedded in the metal surface and which over time begin to oxidize. This oxidation causes the surface to become dull and may impart a brown color to it. After-rust can be avoided by cleaning such surfaces only with non-ferrous brushes/ wools including rustless bronze, aluminum, and stainless steel wool and nonferrous wools such as those made of brass.
