= Suspicious Package =

Studio album by Earl Greyhound
- Released: April 13, 2010
- Genre: Blues rock; hard rock
- Length: 44:55
- Label: Hawk Race
- Producer: Dave Schiffman

Earl Greyhound chronology
Soft Targets (2006)	Suspicious Package (2010)

Professional ratings
Review scores
Source	Rating
PopMatters	9/10 stars
Spin	4/5 stars
Impose Magazine	(positive)
Popwreckoning	(positive)

Suspicious Package is the second full-length album by the American blues rock band Earl Greyhound. It was released in April 2010 by the band's own label, Hawk Race Records. The album marks a departure from the band's previous album, Soft Targets, by mixing that album's blues rock sounds with additional genre influences, while increasing the contributions of bassist/keyboardist/singer Kamara Thomas and drummer Ricc Sheridan.

== Track listing ==
All tracks are written by Earl Greyhound.

No.	Title	Length
1.	"The Eyes of Cassandra (Part 1)"	2:08
2.	"The Eyes of Cassandra (Part 2)"	4:33
3.	"Oye Vaya"	3:24
4.	"Ghost and the Witness"	3:44
5.	"Shotgun"	4:49
6.	"Holy Immortality"	3:20
7.	"Sea of Japan"	3:50
8.	"Black Sea Vacation"	3:14
9.	"Bill Evans"	3:57
10.	"Out of Air"	5:29
11.	"Misty Morning"	6:33

== Personnel ==
- Matt Whyte (guitar, vocals)
- Kamara Thomas (bass, keyboards, vocals)
- Ricc Sheridan (drums)
