= SoS =

SoS may refer to:

- Scotland on Sunday, a newspaper
- Scrum of scrums, a technique to operate scrum at scale for project management
- Son of Sardaar, an Indian film
- System of systems, systems that pool their resources and capabilities to create a new, more complex system
- "Sea of Sorrow", a 1990s song by Alice in Chains
- Sea of Sorrow, a video game expansion for Hollow Knight: Silksong

== See also ==
- SOS (disambiguation)
