= Earl Greyhound =

- Origin: Brooklyn, New York, USA
- Genres: Blues rock; hard rock
- Years active: 2003–2012
- Labels: Hawk Race Records (2010–present); Some Records (2003–2006)
- Past members: Matt Whyte; Kamara Thomas; Ricc Sheridan; Christopher Bear
- Website: earlgreyhound.com

Earl Greyhound was an American rock trio from Brooklyn, New York, formed by singer/guitarist Matt Whyte in 2003. The band's music was influenced by the blues rock and hard rock of the 1970s and 1990s, and the intertwined vocals of Whyte and bassist Kamara Thomas were a key component of their sound.

== History ==
The band's original lineup consisted of Whyte, Thomas, and drummer Christopher Bear. Ricc Sheridan replaced Bear just after the band recorded its first full-length album. They were first signed to Some Records but later started their own label, Hawk Race Records. After an EP in 2004, the band's first full-length album, Soft Targets, was released in 2006, followed by Suspicious Package in 2010. The band then went on an extended hiatus and have had no documented activity since releasing an EP in 2012.

Kamara Thomas went on to explore Americana music with backing band The Ghost Gamblers, and released the albums Earth Hero in 2013 and Tularosa in 2022. Matt Whyte released the album To a Deer Outside Ithaca with the indie-pop duo Rupe Shearns in 2017.

== Discography ==
=== Studio albums ===
- Soft Targets, Some Records (2006)
- Suspicious Package, Hawk Race Records (2010)

=== EPs ===
- Earl Greyhound, Some Records (EP, 2004)
- Ancient Futures, Hawk Race Records (EP, 2010)
- Besides Seasides, Hawk Race Records (EP, 2012)

=== Live albums ===
- I'm on Jupiter Waving My Arms at You: Live at the Calhoun School, Hawk Race Records (2010)

== Appearances ==
- The premiere episode of the 2007 series, Bionic Woman, featured the song, "S.O.S".
- Their songs "All Better Now" and "S.O.S." were featured in four video games: Sony's MLB 07: The Show, EA Sports' Arena Football: Road to Glory, Madden NFL 08 and Burnout Dominator.
- The song "Oye Vaya" is featured in the video games NHL 10, Need for Speed: Nitro and Shaun White Skateboarding and can be downloaded for Rock Band 2 through the Rock Band Network.
- The song "Sea of Japan" was featured in the season four finale of the television series Friday Night Lights.
- The video for "Shotgun" was included in the Beavis and Butt-head episode "Going Down".
