= Sós =

Sós, Sos or Şoş ([ˈʃoːʃ], its literal meaning in the Hungarian language being salty) is a Hungarian surname. It may refer to:

- Csaba Sós (born 1957), retired Hungarian swimmer
- Károly Sós (1909–1991), Hungarian footballer and manager
- Márkó Sós (born 1990), Hungarian football player
- Rozalia Șoș (born 1947), former Romanian handball player
- Vera T. Sós (1930–2023), Hungarian mathematician
