= Steel wool =

Bundle of very fine and flexible sharp-edged steel filaments

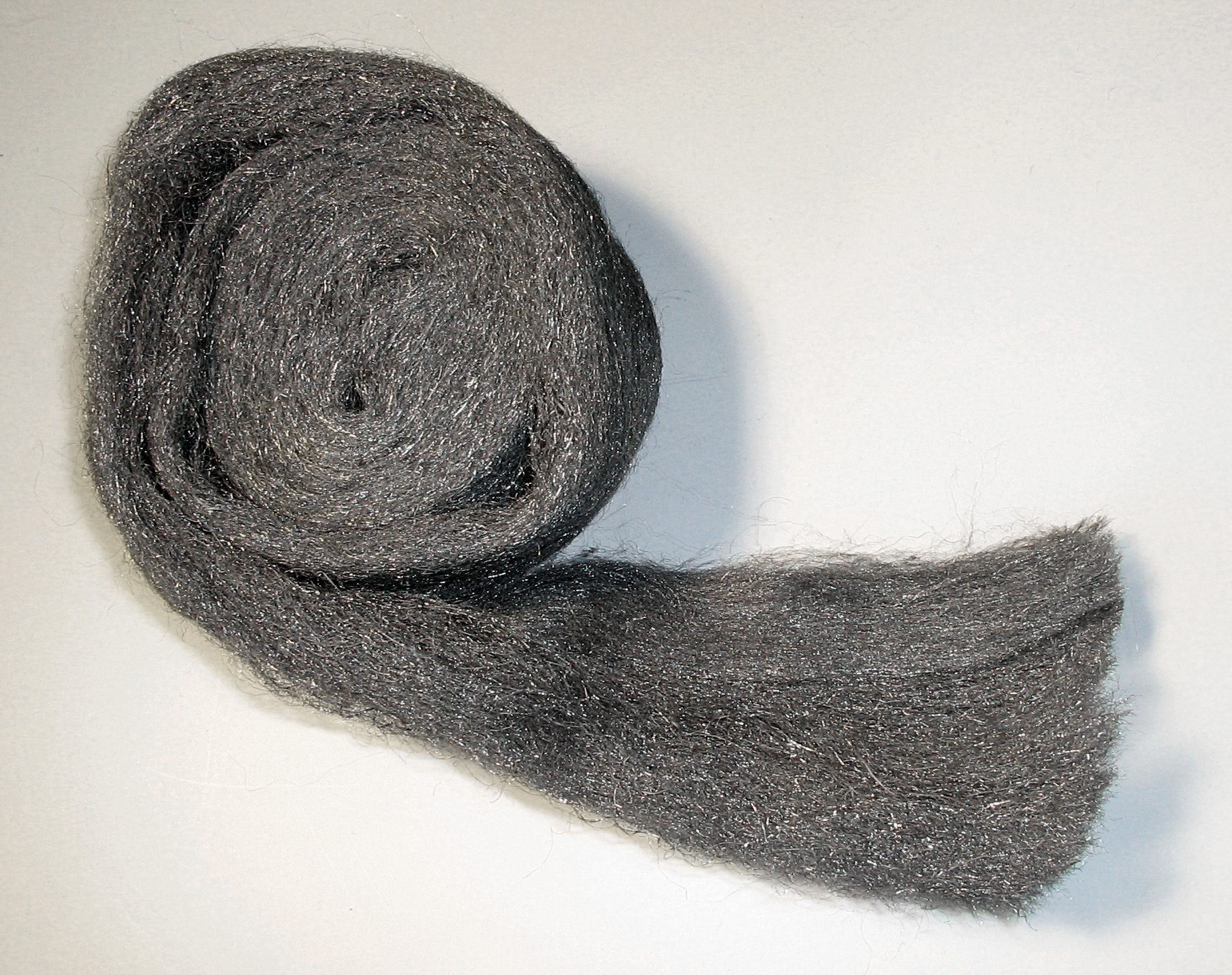
A piece of steel wool

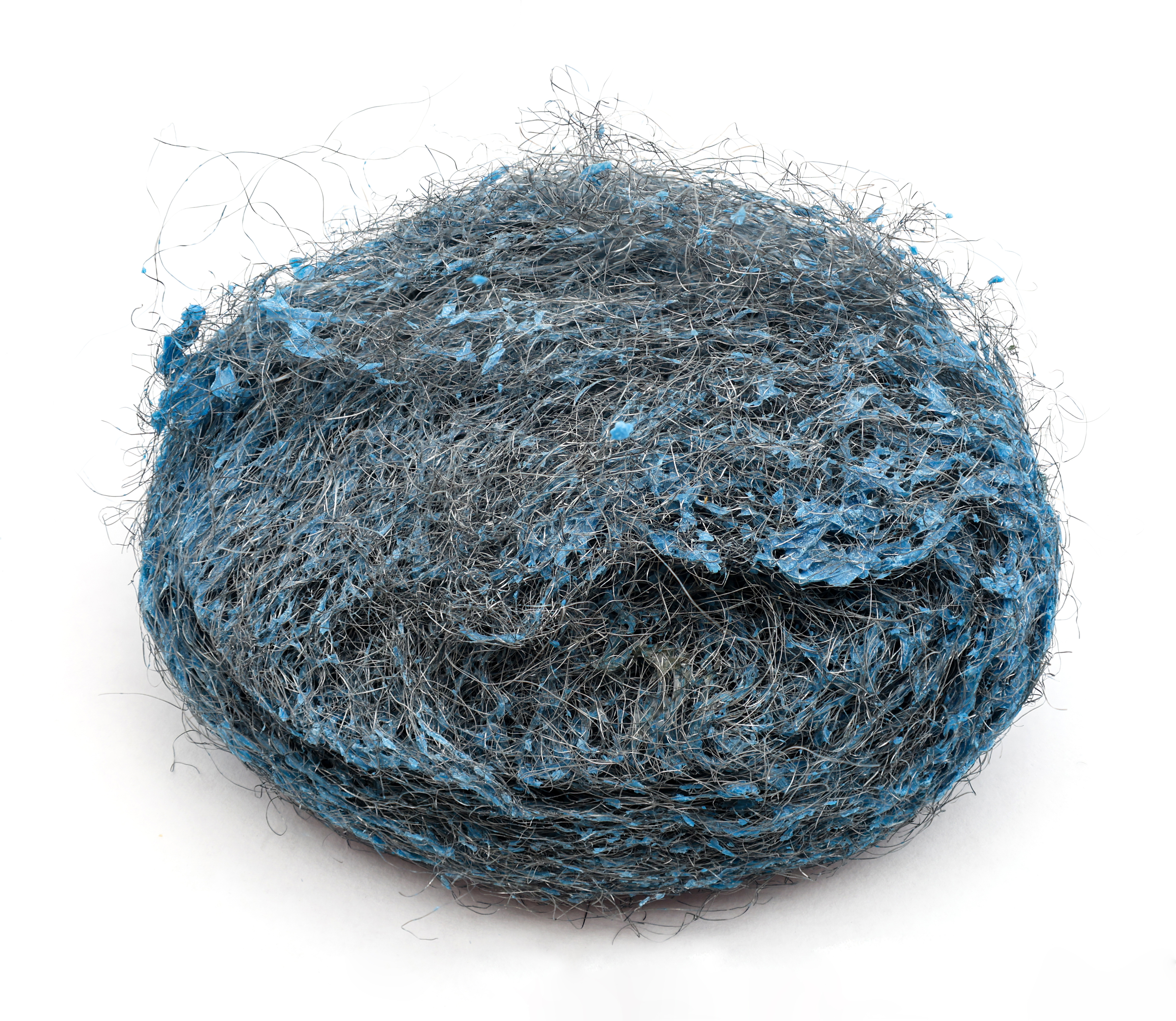
Soap-impregnated steel wool pad for household cleaning

Steel wool, also known as iron wool or wire sponge, is a bundle of very fine and flexible sharp-edged steel filaments. It is the most common type of wire wool and is often the type meant when wire wool is mentioned. It was described as a new product in 1896. It is used as an abrasive in finishing and repair work for polishing wood or metal objects, cleaning household cookware, cleaning windows, and sanding surfaces.

Steel wool is made from low-carbon steel in a process similar to broaching, where a heavy steel wire is pulled through a toothed die that removes thin, sharp, wire shavings.

== Uses ==
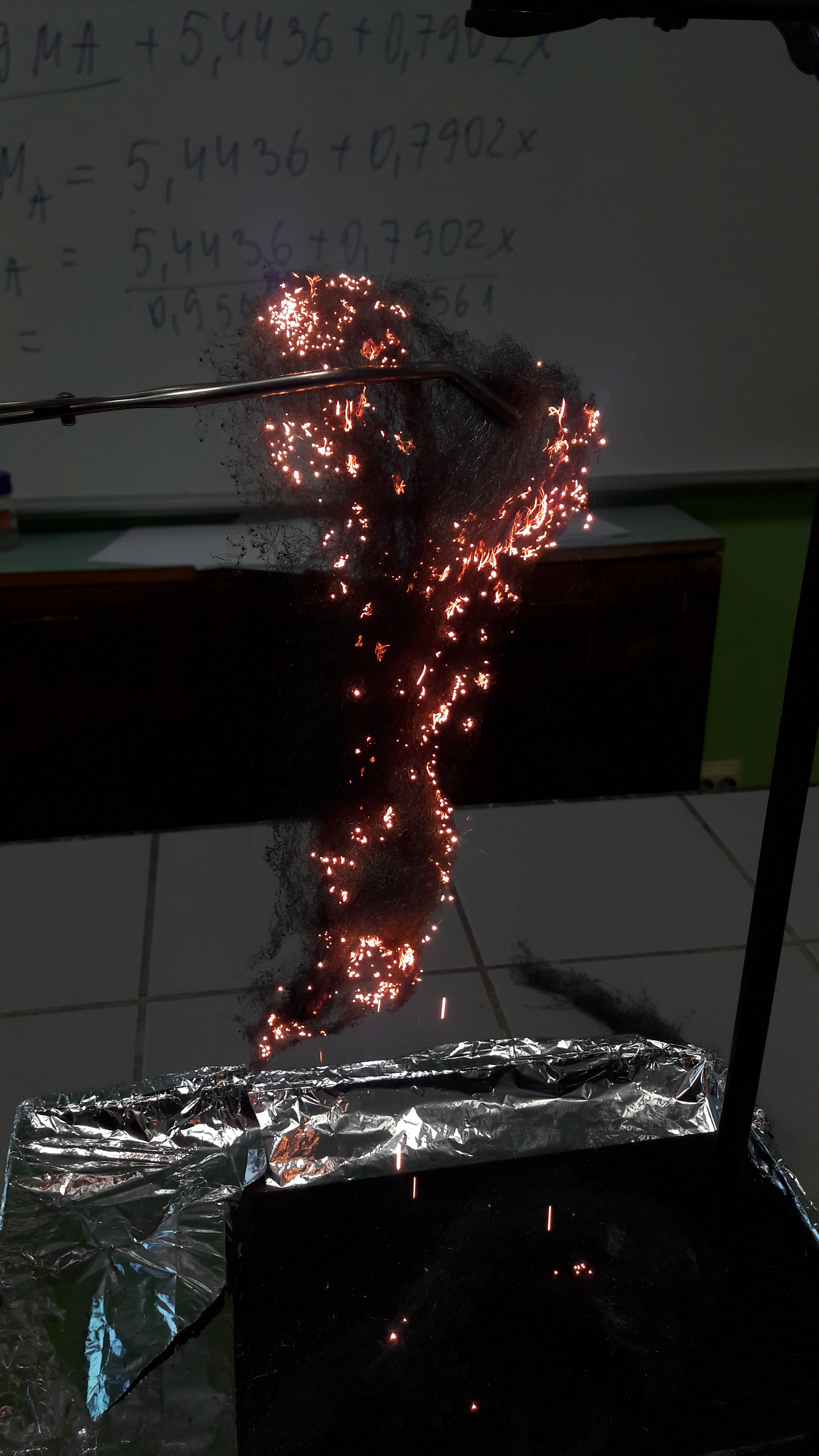
Steel wool burning in air

Steel wool is commonly used by woodworkers, metal craftsmen, and jewelers to clean and smooth working surfaces and give them shine. However, when used on oak, remaining traces of iron may react with tannins in the wood to produce blue or black iron stain, and when used on aluminium, brass, or other non-ferrous metal surfaces may cause after-rust which will dull and discolor the surface. Bronze wool and stainless steel wool will not cause these undesirable effects.

Steel wool is often used for professional cleaning processes on glass and porcelain because it is softer than those materials and is able to scrape off deposits without scratching the underlying surface like common abrasives. In many countries, soap-impregnated steel wool pads were sold under various trade names including Brillo Pad, Chore Boy, and S.O.S Soap Pad for household cleaning, although those products sometimes no longer contain steel wool.

Another use for steel wool is in rodent control. Small holes are plugged with coarse grade steel wool, which, if gnawed on by rodents, causes extreme pain in the mouth and, if ingested, severe internal damage may lead to death.

When steel wool is heated or allowed to rust, it increases in mass due to the combination of oxygen with iron.

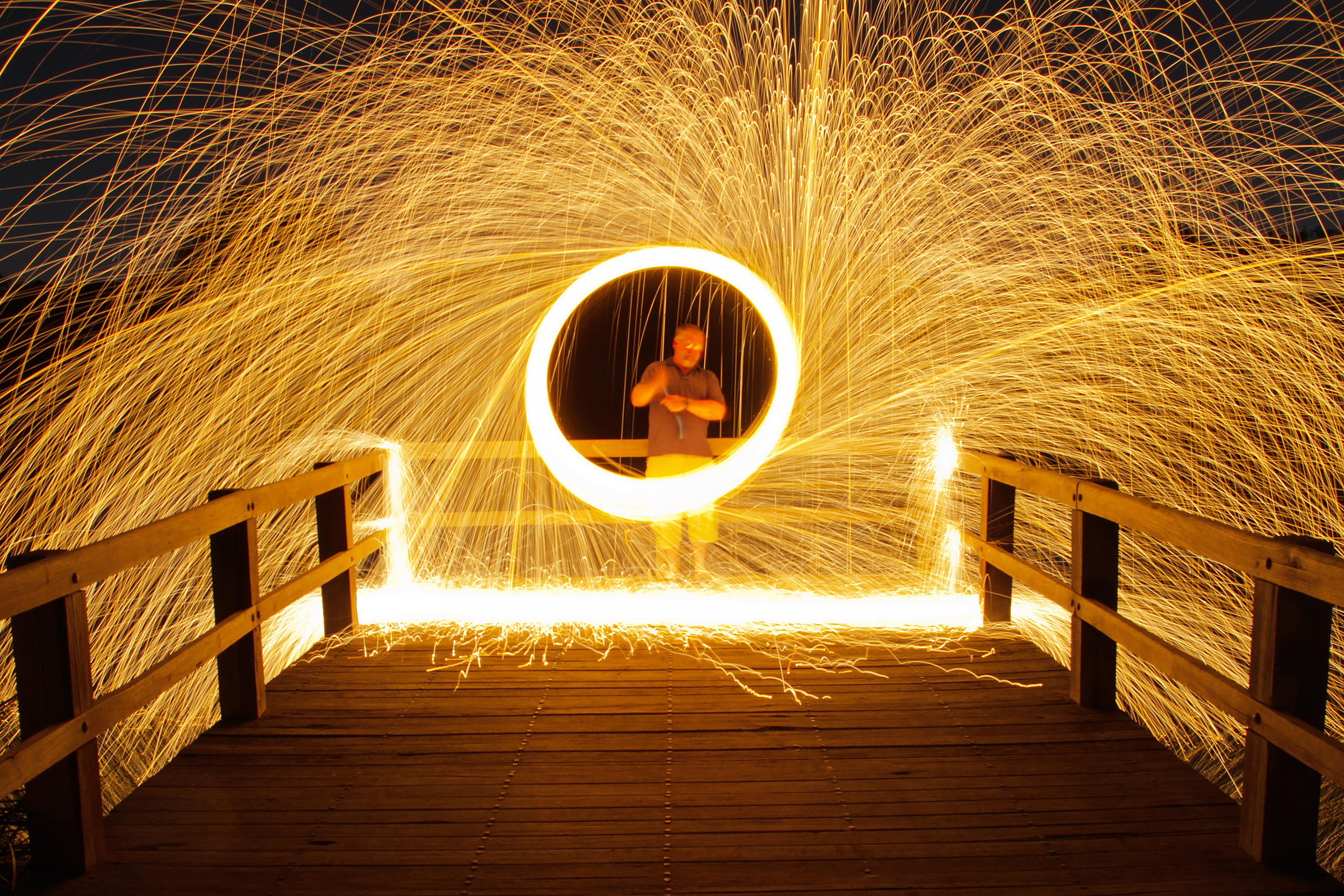
Piece of burning steel wool being spun to produce sparks for light painting

The fine cross-section of steel wool makes it combustible in air. Light painting, where many sparks are released, is one application. Very fine steel wool can also be used as tinder in emergency situations, as it burns even when wet and can be ignited by fire, a spark, or by connecting a battery to produce joule heating.

== Grades ==
Steel wool products are supplied in grades from the coarser grades 3 and 4 to the super fine grade 0000. Rust-resistant (stainless) steel wool is also available.

Steel Wool fiber thickness
Grade Name	Grade Code	inches	μm
Super Fine	0000#	0.0010	25
Extra Fine	000#	0.0015	35
Very Fine	00#	0.0018	40
Fine	0#	0.0020	50
Medium	1#	0.0025	60
Medium Coarse	2#	0.0030	75
Coarse	3#	0.0035	90
Extra Coarse	4#	0.0040	100

== See also ==
- Bronze wool
- Glass wool
- Mineral wool
- Polishing
- Wood finishing
