= Lake Mohonk =

Lake in Ulster County, New York, USA

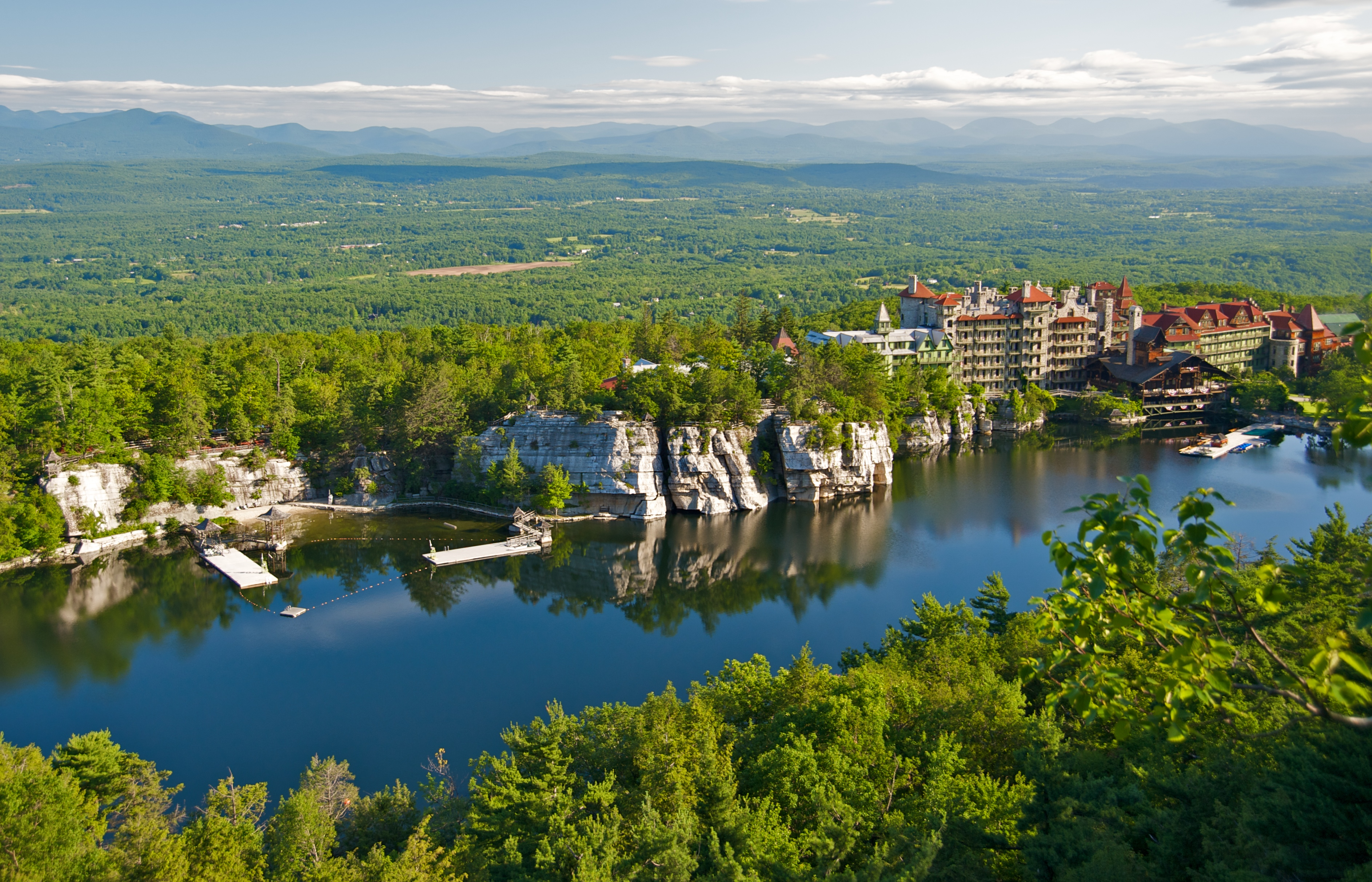
- Lake Mohonk

- Location within New York Location within the United States
- Location: Ulster County, New York
- Coordinates: 41°45′58″N 074°09′25″W
- Basin countries: United States
- Surface area: 17 acres (6.9 ha)
- Max. depth: 60 ft (18 m)
- Surface elevation: 1,253 ft (382 m)
- Settlements: Marbletown

Lake Mohonk is located in Ulster County, New York, United States. It is located approximately 14 miles (23 km) northwest of Poughkeepsie. Activities on the lake are operated by Mohonk Mountain House.

== Description ==
The small lake, one-half mile (0.80 km) long and 60 feet (18 m) deep, is located 1,245 feet (379 m) above sea level in the town of New Paltz near Sky Top Mountain, at 1,542 feet (470 m) one of the highest peaks of the Shawangunk Ridge.

The peak of Sky Top lies just east of the south end of the lake; to the west, Eagle Cliff rises to a height of 1,412 feet (430 m). Competitors in the Survival of the Shawangunks swim the lake as their final aquatic leg of the competition.

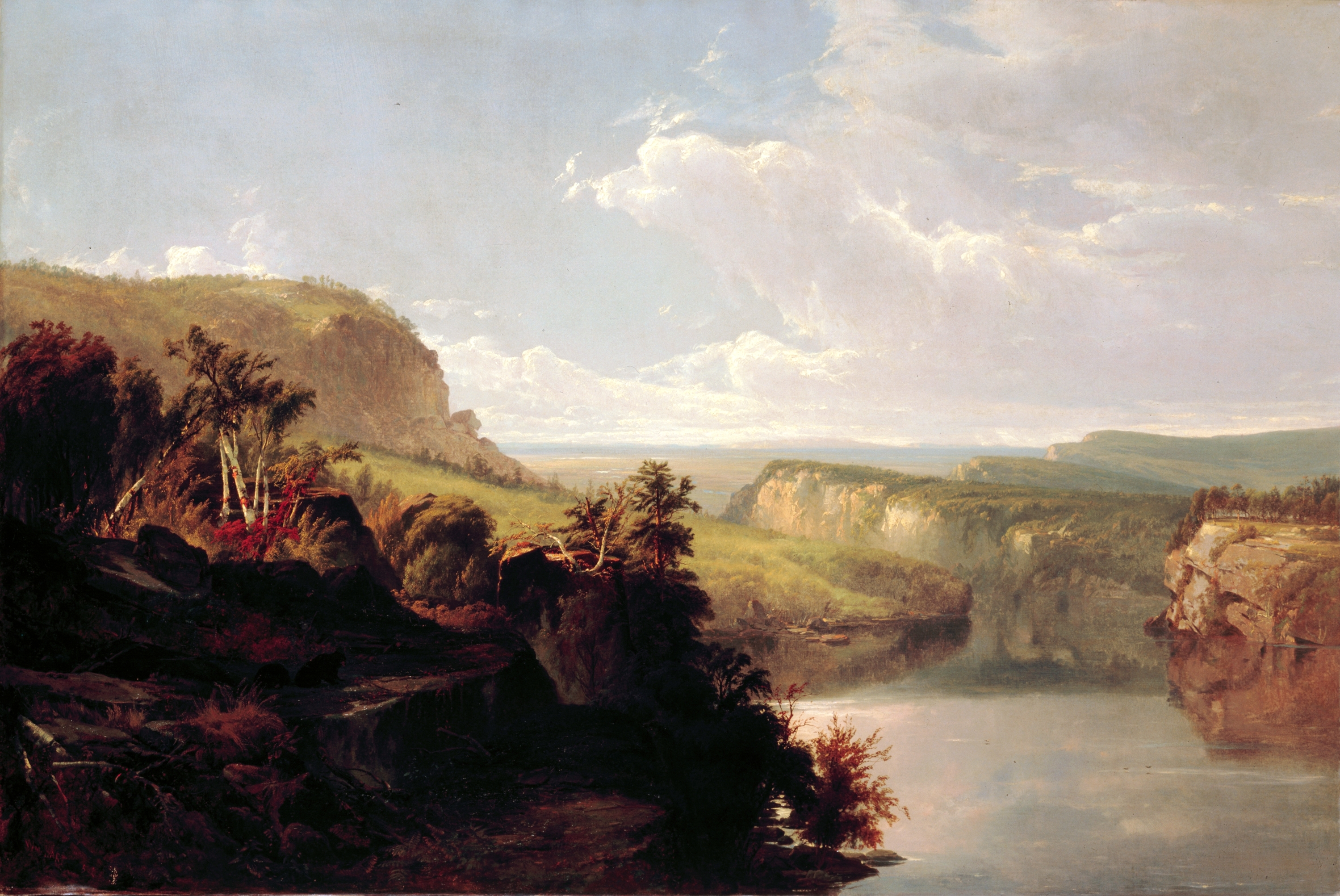
Lake Among the Hills (1858) by William Hart, on display at the White House

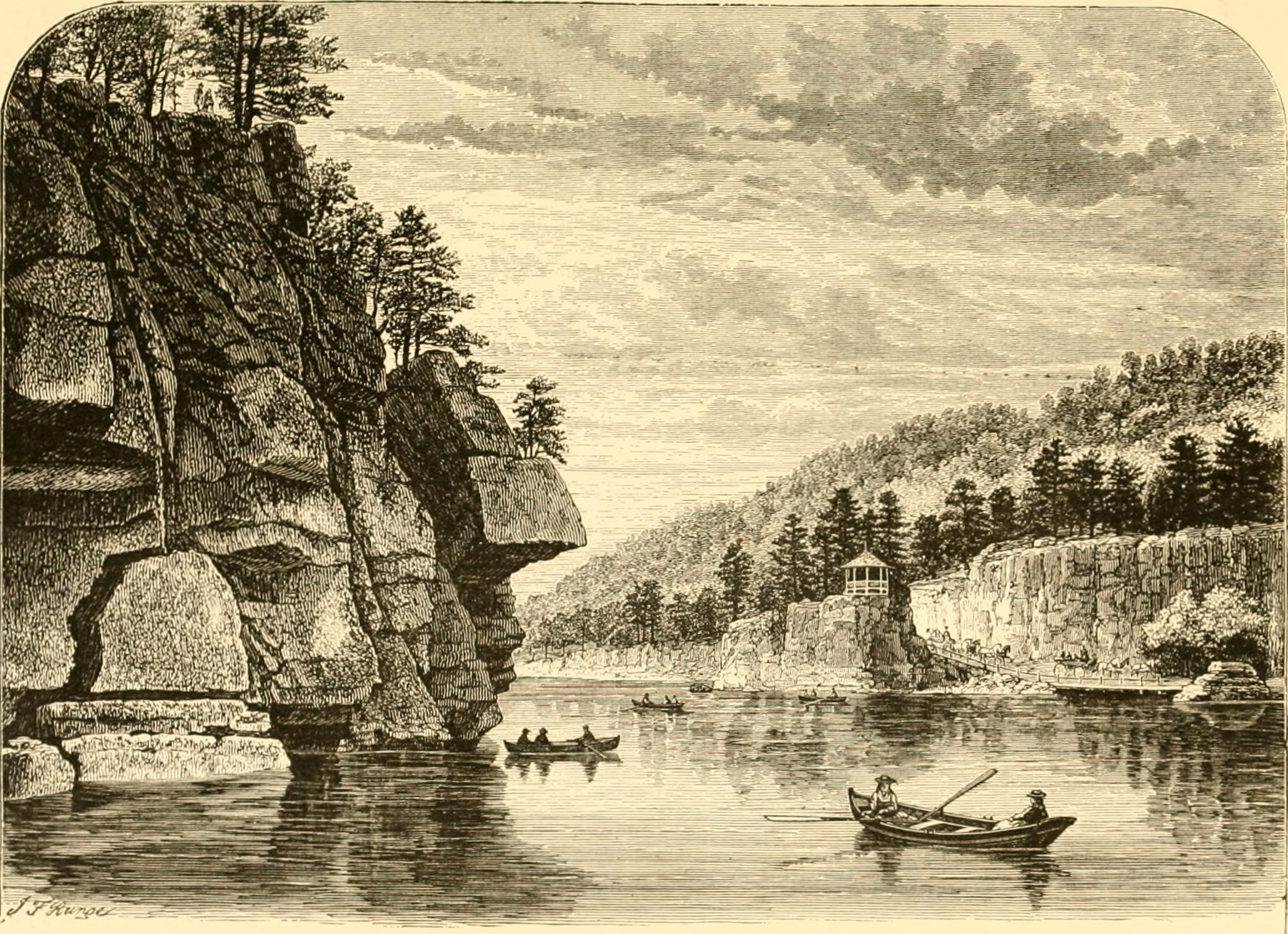
Lake Mohonk, 1881

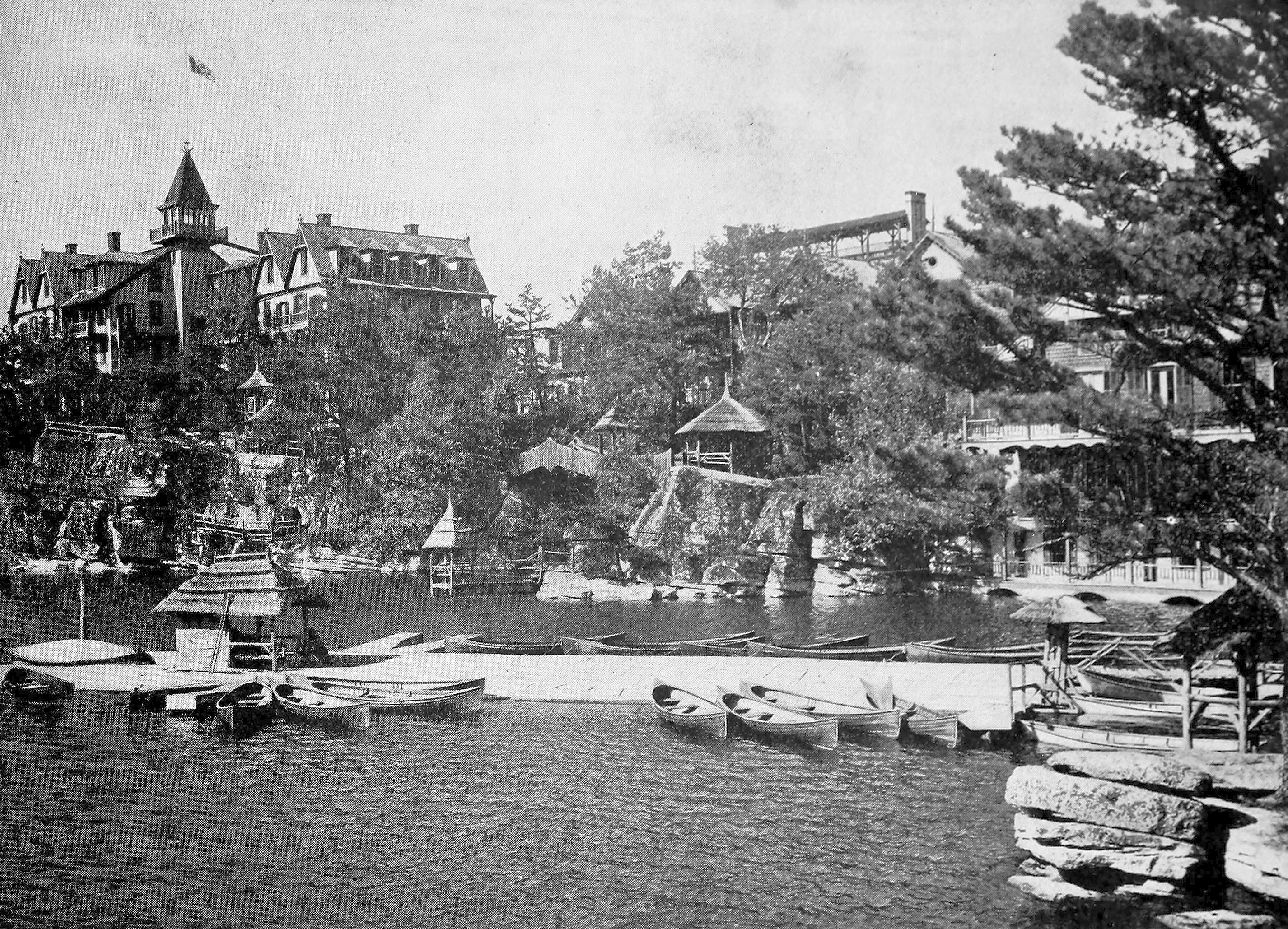
Lake Mohonk, 1899

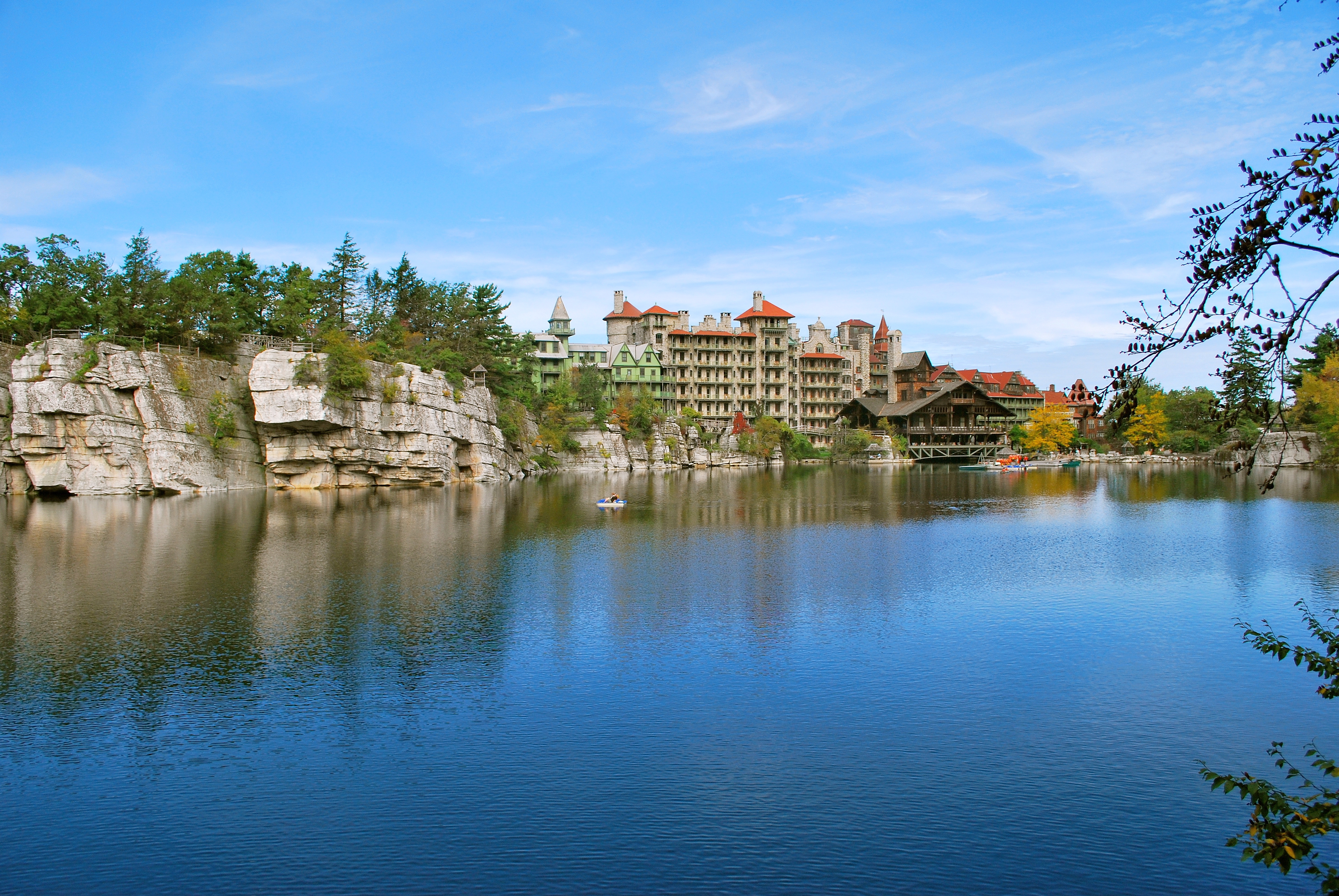
Lake Mohonk, 2011
