= S.O.S. (appetizer) =

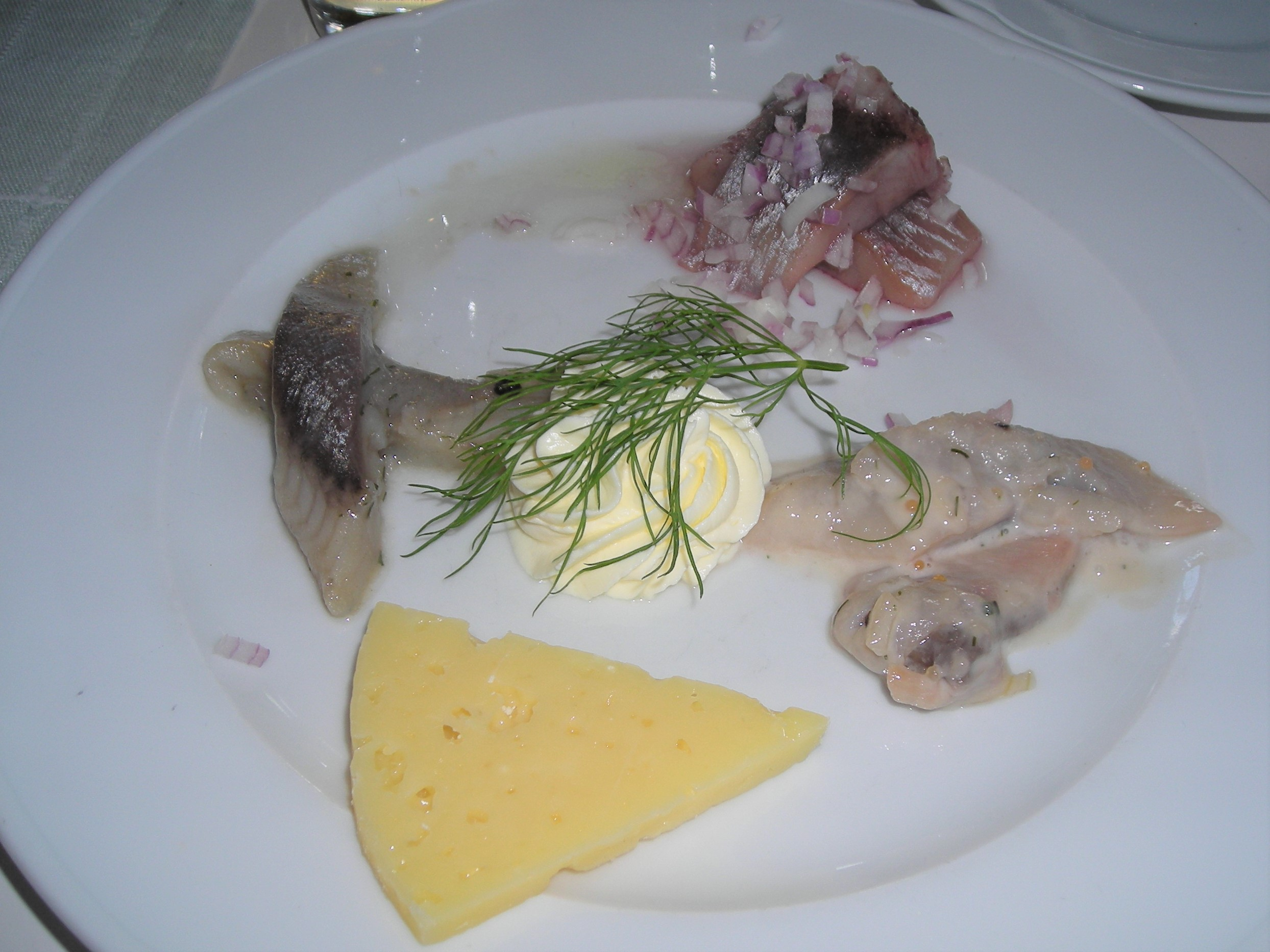
- Course: Hors d'oeuvre
- Place of origin: Sweden
- Main ingredients: Herring, butter, cheese

S.O.S. is a traditional Swedish appetizer. It stands for "smör, ost och sill", which describes its main ingredients: butter, cheese and herring. It is usually eaten with snaps Akvavit. The name parodies the morse code signal SOS, commonly used to indicate emergencies or distress.
