= Scouring pad =

Small pad of metal or plastic mesh used for scouring a surface

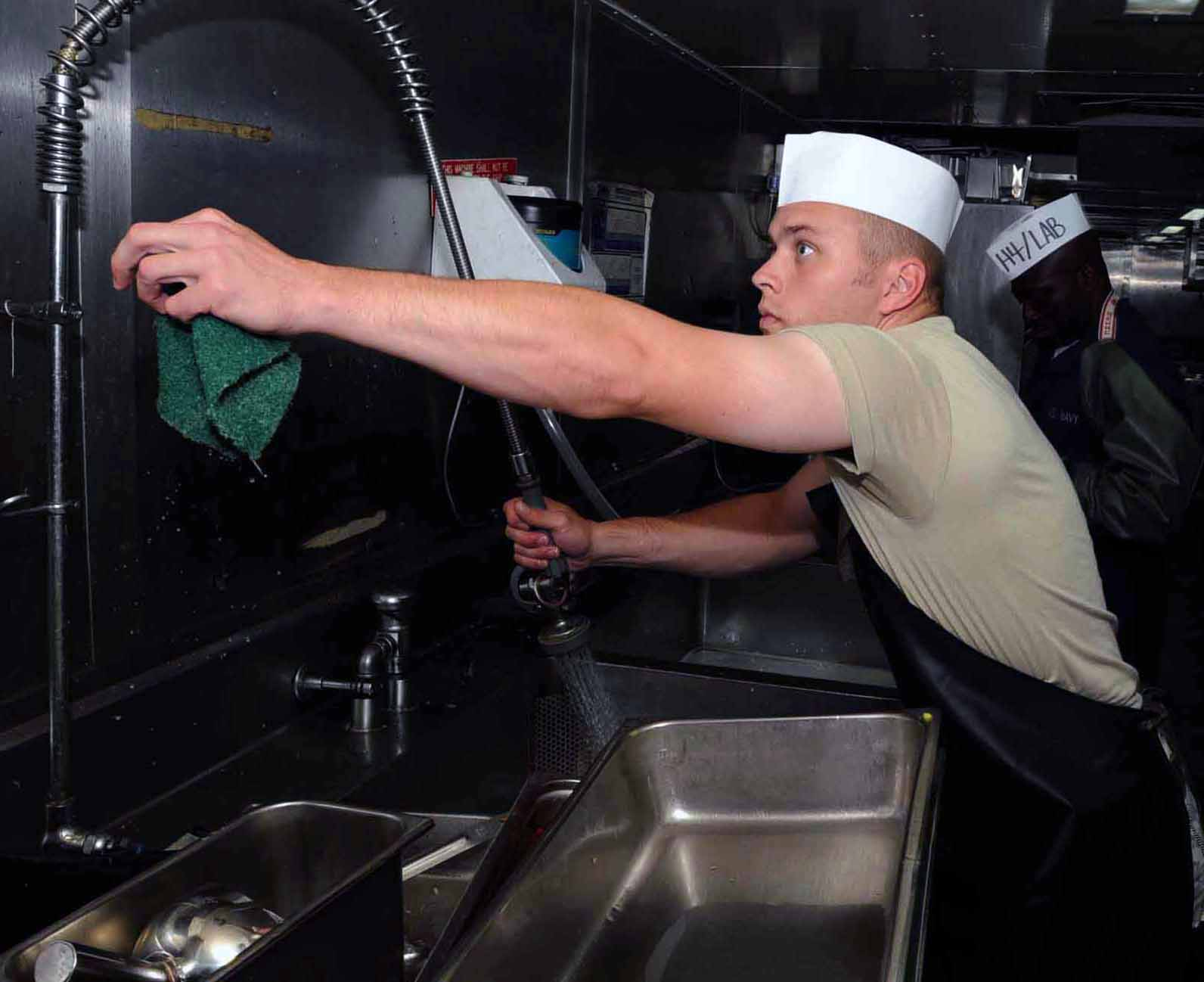
Cleaning with a scouring pad.

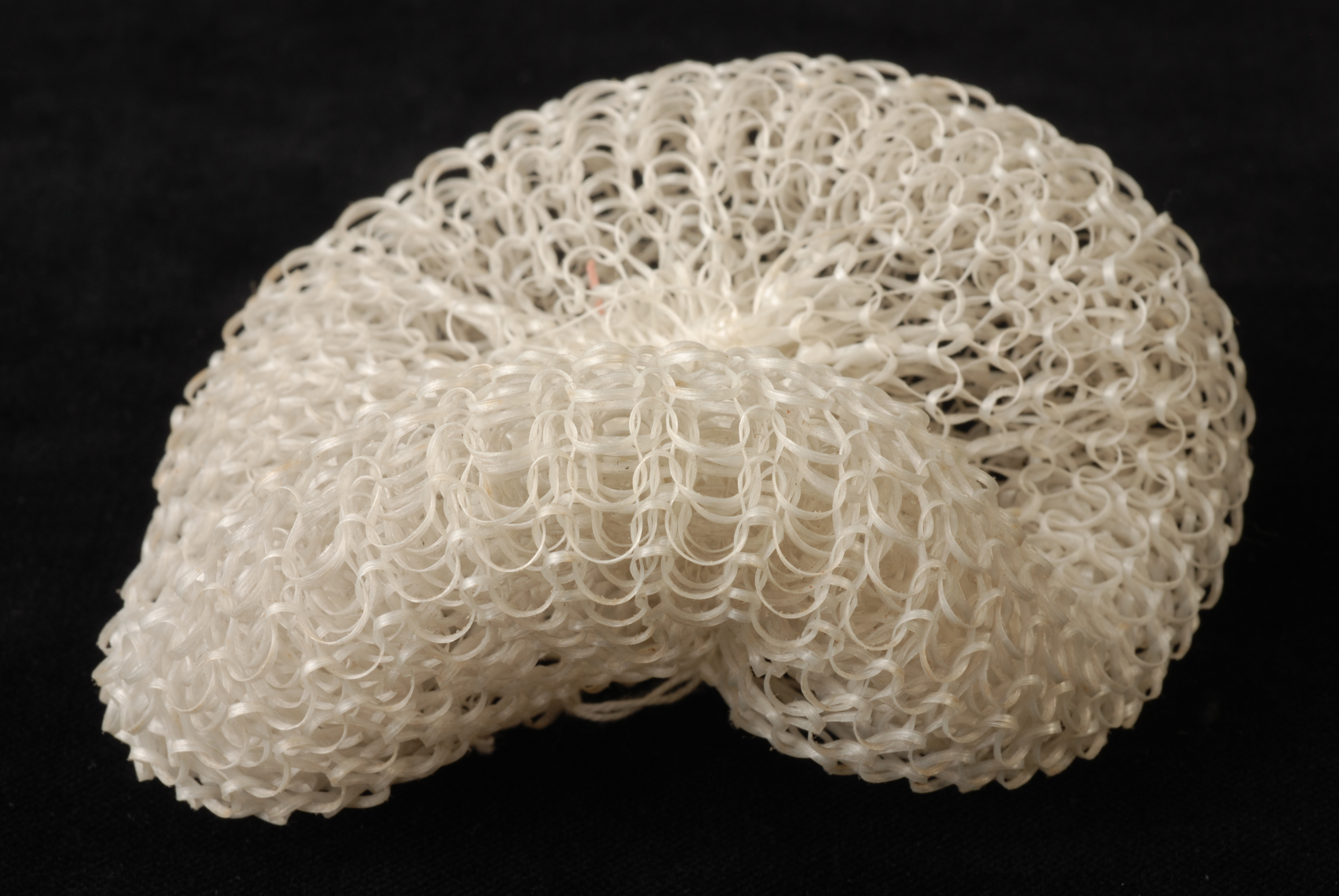
Toroidal scouring pad made of plastic wires, thus less aggressive to non-stick surfaces

A scouring pad or scourer is a small pad of metal or plastic mesh used for scouring a surface. Some scouring pads have one side made of a soft sponge-like material and the other is the aforementioned mesh.

== History ==
The scouring pad has been reincarnated in several forms over the years. In 1928, R. B. Kingman patented the scouring ball, which was one of the first scouring pads made of a metal mesh.

On 30 September 1941, United States patent 2,257,456 was issued to Joseph R. Crockford of Chicago, IL for a scouring device of the type employed for "cleansing and scouring pots, pans and other household implements." The invention provided for a "plate of non-corrosive metal, arched or curved to fit the fingers."

In 1942, David J. Kelman patented a toroidal metal scouring pad. This was, and still is, used as an abrasive scrubbing pad, however, it is becoming less common, as it removes non-stick surfaces off pans.

On June 19, 1962, Alfred Benjamin patented the stainless-steel scouring pad - United States patent 3,039,125.

In 1988, the first scouring pad made out of sponge material was patented by Hans J. Hartmann. This enabled the scouring pad to float. To achieve this, he used a technique to thread the metal mesh through the sponge and wrap it around the outside. This was meant to stop the scouring pad from dropping to the bottom of the sink.

In 1973, the plastic needle surface (now more commonly used) was invented by Edward Mednick, who invented the new surface as a way of reducing the damage scouring pads did to non-stick surfaces. This technology and varieties thereon are what most scouring pads sold today are based upon.

== Use ==
Using scouring pads on non-stick surfaces such as Teflon is not advisable as they may strip away the coating. It is advisable to use protective equipment such as rubber gloves when using scouring pads as this is known to prevent (or at least hide) any irritation caused by use.

== See also ==
- Scotch-Brite, a brand of polymer-based scouring pad produced by 3M
- Brillo Pad
- S.O.S Soap Pad
