= Wool (surname) =

Wool is a surname. Notable people with the surname include:

- Christopher Wool (born 1955), American artist
- Dan Wool, American composer and sound designer
- Glenn Wool (born 1974), Canadian stand-up comedian
- John E. Wool (1784–1869), United States Army general
