= Science On a Sphere =

Spherical projection system

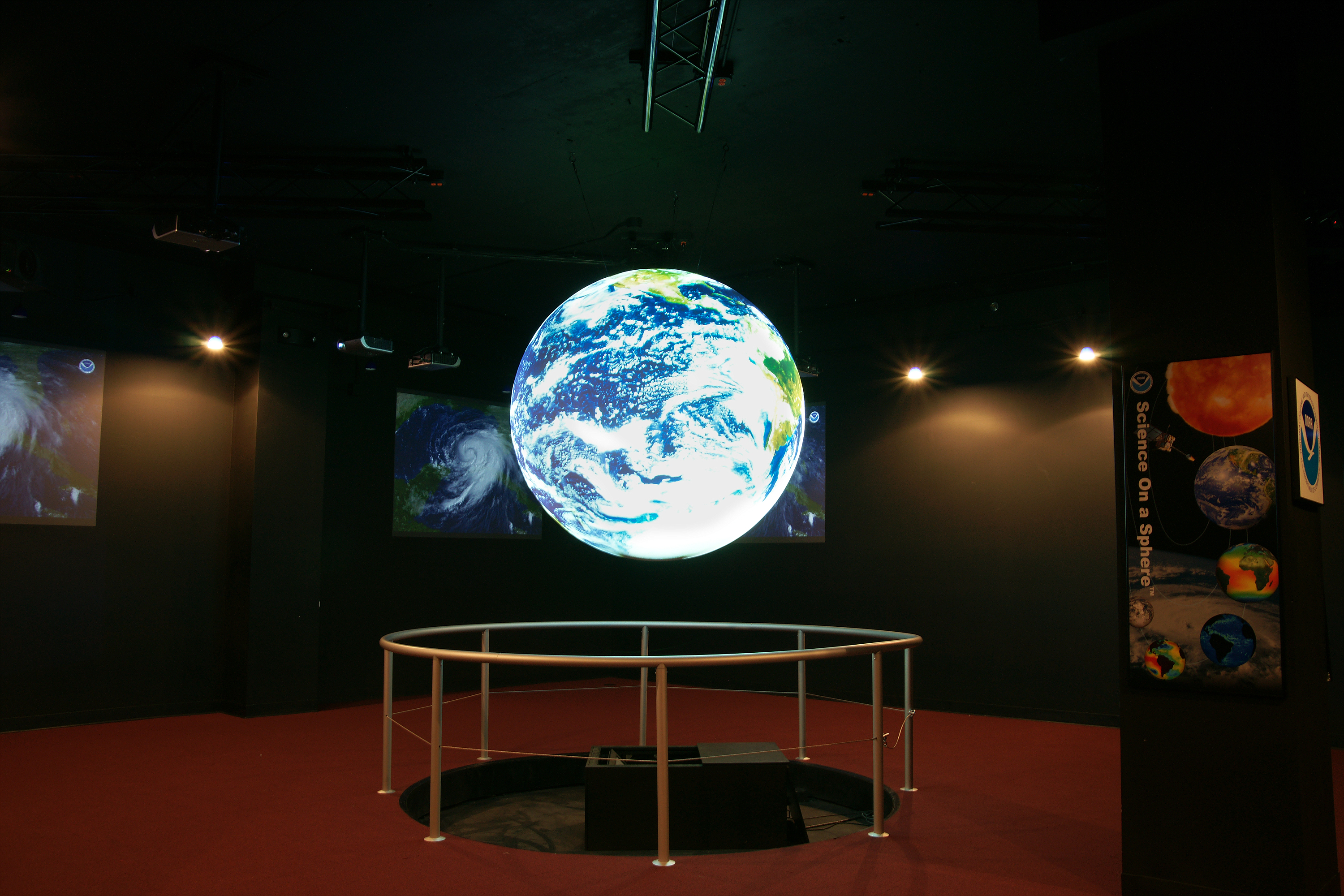
SOS in the Planet Theater at the NOAA Earth System Research Laboratories in Boulder, Colorado

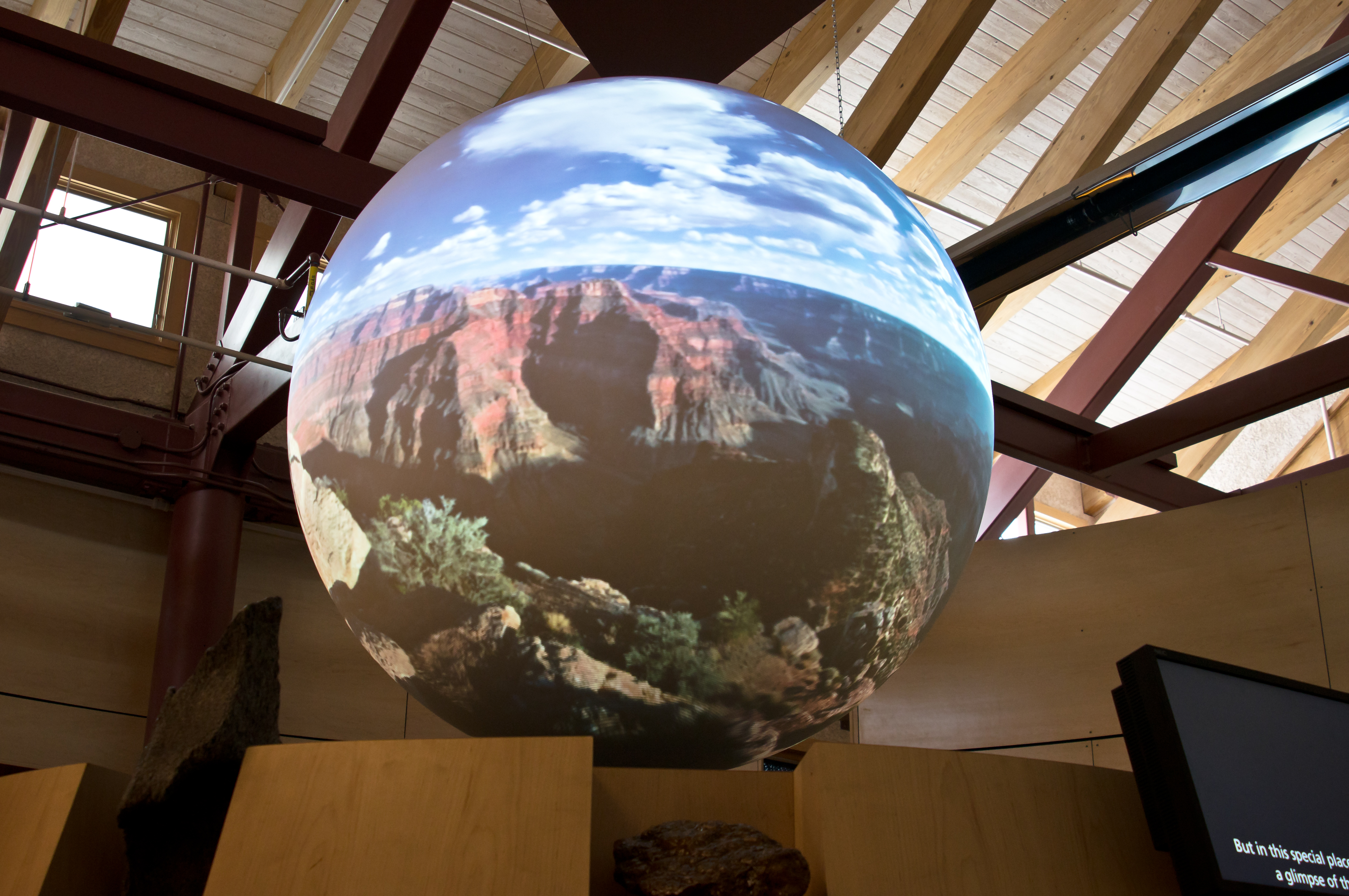
The Canyon World in the Science On a Sphere Theater at Grand Canyon Visitor Center

Science On a Sphere (SOS) is a spherical projection system created by the United States National Oceanic and Atmospheric Administration (NOAA). It displays high-resolution video on a suspended globe with the aim of better representing global phenomena. Animated images of atmospheric storms, climate change, and ocean temperature can be displayed on the sphere to display environmental processes. SOS systems are most frequently installed in science museums, universities, zoos, and research institutions.

== History ==
SOS was invented by Alexander E. MacDonald, the former director of the Earth System Research Laboratories. MacDonald devised the original idea for SOS in 1995. A team of NOAA staff wrote the SOS software and developed the SOS hardware and system architecture. A patent was awarded to NOAA for Science On a Sphere in August 2005.

== Configuration ==
SOS uses many off-the-shelf hardware and software components. A spherical screen covered in ordinary latex paint hangs suspended in the center of the projection space. The screen is inert; it neither moves nor has any electronic parts. Surrounding the screen are four video projectors, with each projector responsible for one quadrant of screen space. One CPU is used to control the system. The SOS software runs on Linux.

=== The sphere ===
The carbon fiber sphere is 68 inches (1.7 m) in diameter and weighs under 50 pounds (23 kg). The sphere is attached to the ceiling or suspension structure with a three-point suspension system to hold the sphere in place and reduce lateral movement and blurring.

=== Projectors ===
The system requires high quality, bright, long-duty cycle projectors, rather than smaller portable and consumer models to endure the requirements of 8–10 hours per day, 7 days per week of most public displays.

=== Computer hardware ===
The newest configuration uses one Ubuntu Linux computer with NVIDIA Quadro graphics cards, and an iPad app to control the system.

=== SOS data details ===
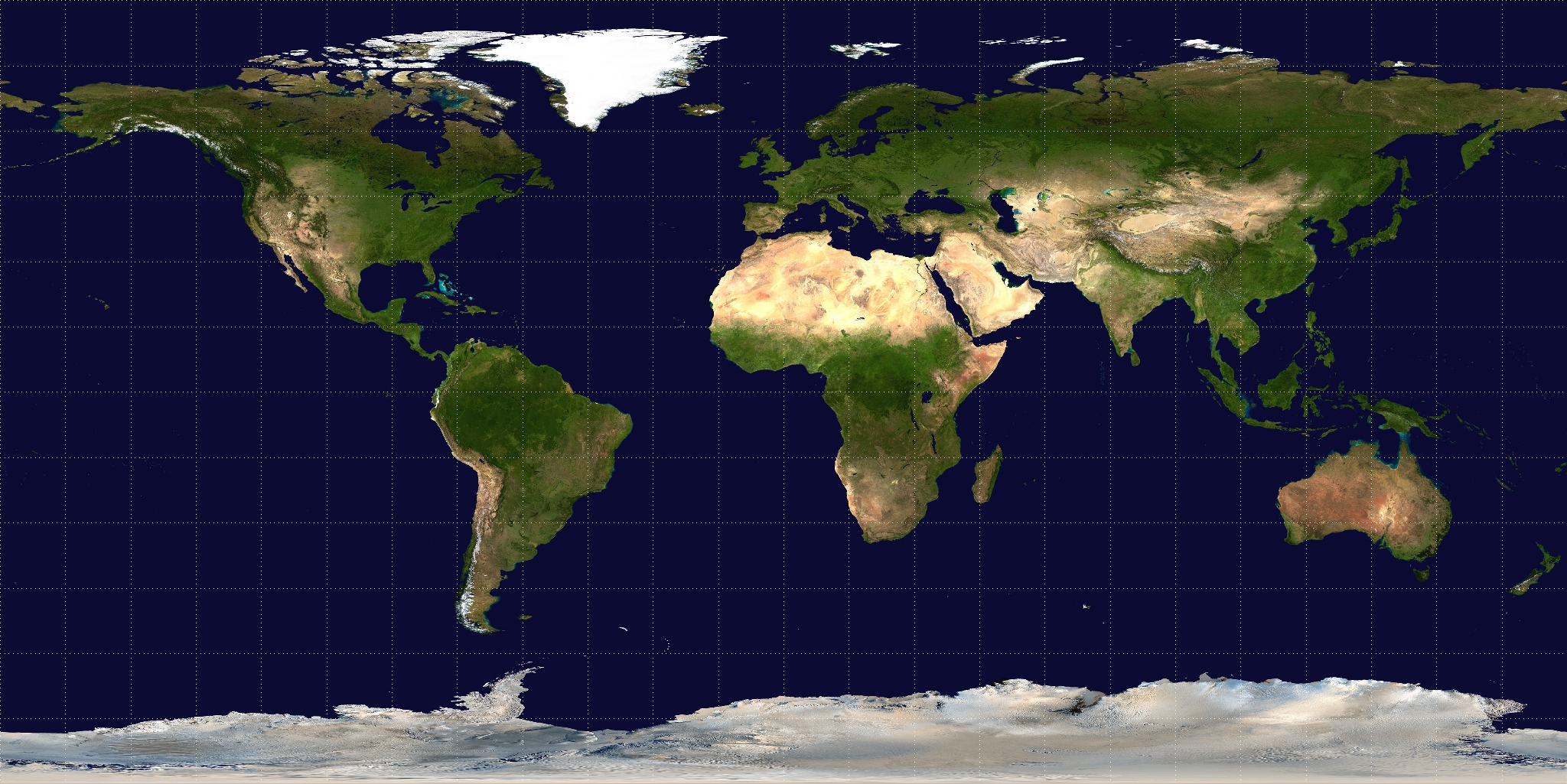
An equirectangular projection of the Earth; the standard parallel is the equator.

The majority of SOS assets are so-called "datasets". Originally conceived as a video system for showing space-based collections of Earth data, the SOS has grown in its utility. The majority of data that traditionally appears on the SOS screens concerns the Earth, either from near-real-time data acquisition systems, or from processed remote sensing platforms, but recent interest and growth in different kinds of media have started to broaden that library. There are currently over 500 datasets that can be shown on the sphere, including real-time infrared satellite images, Mars, real-time earthquakes, an ocean acidification model, and others, including a number of movies.

The data format for SOS datasets is the equirectangular projection, as shown by the map to the right.

== SOS User's Collaborative Network ==
A collaborative network has been established by institutions with access to SOS, as well as partners who are developing educational programming and content for these systems. The SOS Users Collaborative Network is backed by the NOAA Office of Education (OEd) and the NOAA Earth System Research Laboratories (ESRL).

== See also ==
- Virtual globe
