= Survival of the Shawangunks =

Coordinates: 41.722°N 74.120°W

The Survival of the Shawangunks is a triathlon held in the town of New Paltz, New York. It is unusual in that it has seven transitions among the three racing modalities, compared to the two that are typical for the sport (switching from swimming to cycling, and then from cycling to running). Self-sufficiency in this race that culminates with a thousand-foot climb to the finish line is celebrated; participants must carry their running shoes as they swim and may only have a single person assist them during the competition.

== History ==
The SOS was founded in 1983 by Don Davis as a way to train for the Ironman Triathlon. The best overall time for the event was 4:10:43 by Erik Grimm in 1993; Jan Wanklyn holds the record for best female finish with her time of 4:44:49 in 2000.

94 participants completed the course in 1998, the earliest year for which results are available. The race was capped at 150 participants until 2007, at which point the field was expanded to 170. In 2007 and 2008, 149 competitors crossed the finish line; among them were triathletes from throughout North America, including Quebec, California, and Florida.

The race was originally run unofficially by Davis and two others in secrecy, as they had not obtained permission from private landowners for the competition, but the following year's competition was open to other triathletes, all of whom must have completed a half-ironman triathlon in the previous 18 months, or in the prior year's SOS, within certain time restrictions in order to be eligible.

== Course ==
The race is 50.5 miles (81.3 km) long, beginning at the Ulster County Fairgrounds. Participants begin by bicycling thirty miles. This is followed by a total of seven transitions, more than is found in other competitions of this sort: a 4.2 miles (6.8 km) run to Lake Awosting, 1.1 mile swim across the lake, a 5.5 mile run to Lake Minnewaska, a 0.5 miles (0.80 km) swim along that lake's eastern shore, an 8 miles (13 km) run to Lake Mohonk, a 0.5 miles (0.80 km) swim along the east shore of Mohonk Lake, and a 0.7 miles (1.1 km) uphill run to the Skytop Tower on Shawangunk Ridge. The course gains and loses several thousands of feet of altitude and provides a number of stunning views for participants, and the finish line is visible from a number of points along the course.

In 2002, weather conditions necessitated a modified course of 30 miles (48 km) bicycling, a 19 miles (31 km) run, a 0.5 miles (0.80 km) swim in Lake Mohonk, and a final 0.7 miles (1.1 km) run up Skytop, a total of 50.2 miles (80.8 km).

The number of transitions between swimming and running necessitate competitors bringing their running gear with them as they swim and their goggles as they run. Athletes tuck them into their swimming gear, carry them in a plastic bag, or pull them on small rafts. Self-sufficiency is a theme for the competition, and to that end, participants are only permitted one assistant.
