= Soft Targets =

Studio album by Earl Greyhound
- Released: August 8, 2006
- Genre: Blues rock, hard rock
- Length: 49:07
- Label: Some Records
- Producer: Earl Greyhound, Tim Edgar

Earl Greyhound chronology
Soft Targets (2006)	Suspicious Package (2010)

Professional ratings
Review scores
Source	Rating
Allmusic	4/5 stars
PopMatters	6/10 stars
Spin	4/5 stars

Soft Targets is the first full-length album by the American blues rock band Earl Greyhound. It was released in August 2006 by Some Records. Drummer Christopher Bear left the band just after the album was recorded, and was replaced by Ricc Sheridan.

== Track listing ==
All tracks are written by Matt Whyte except where noted.

No.	Title	Writer(s)	Length
1.	"S.O.S."		4:59
2.	"All Better Now"		2:54
3.	"It's Over"		3:45
4.	"Like a Doggy"		3:40
5.	"Monkey"		8:41
6.	"Good"		4:34
7.	"Back and Forth"	Matt Whyte, Kamara Thomas	3:04
8.	"Yeah I Love You"		3:53
9.	"Fashion"	Matt Whyte, Christopher Bear	4:23
10.	"Two Weeks"		3:49
11.	"I'm the One"		5:28

== Personnel ==
- Matt Whyte (guitar, lead vocals)
- Kamara Thomas (bass, backing vocals, lead vocals on tracks 7 and 8)
- Christopher Bear (drums)
