= Bronze wool =

Abrasive derived from bronze

Bronze wool is a bundle of very fine bronze filaments, used in finishing and repair work to polish wood or metal objects. Bronze wool is similar to steel wool, but is used in its place to avoid some problems associated with broken filaments: steel rusts quickly, especially in a marine environment. Furthermore, steel is magnetic and can affect the operation of marine equipment, such as a compass. Steel can also discolor some materials, such as oak. This discoloration results from a reaction between the tannates in the oak and the iron in the steel, forming iron tannate, a black compound.

Bronze wool also has uses for filter elements, again when rusting would be a problem.

The main US retail supplier of bronze wool is Homax Group, under their Rhodes American brand.

For cost reasons, bronze wool has largely been replaced by plastic mesh abrasives from makers such as Webrax and 3M Scotch-Brite. These use grains of aluminium oxide or silicon carbide, bonded to a non-woven web of nylon fibres. Like bronze wool, they avoid rust problems.
