= S.O.S Soap Pad =

Brand of abrasive cleaning pad

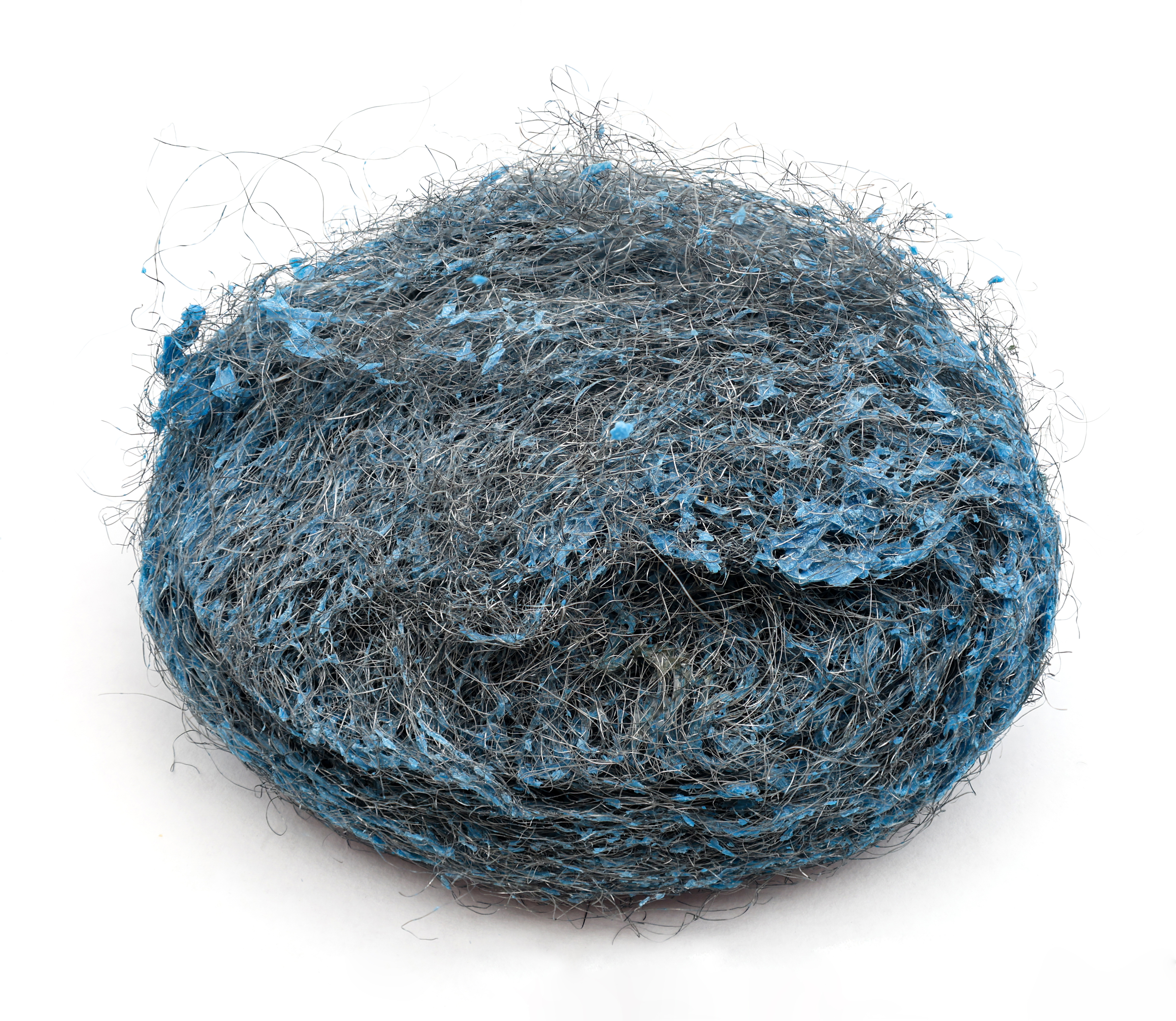
An S.O.S Soap Pad. The soap is the blue substance seen in the pad.

S.O.S Soap Pad is a trade name for an abrasive cleaning pad, used for household cleaning, and made from steel wool saturated with soap.

In 1917, Irwin Cox of San Francisco, California, an aluminum pot salesman, invented a pre-soaped pad with which to clean pots. As a way of introducing himself to potential new customers, Cox made the soap encrusted steel-wool pads as a calling card. His wife named the soap pads S.O.S or "Save Our Saucepans." Cox soon found out that the S.O.S pads were a hotter product than his pots and pans.

It is commonly believed that a period was left out in the name's punctuation. However, this spelling was chosen by design. The acronym, S.O.S., is the famous distress signal and could not be trademarked. By removing the last period, the name was unique and could then be registered with the United States Patent and Trademark Office.

The product was indirectly featured in a widely circulated black & white photograph taken by William Safire of the Kitchen Debate. An S.O.S box is clearly visible on the right side of the picture, standing on the countertop above the washing machine.

S.O.S was bought by General Foods in 1958, then in 1968 it was sold to Miles Laboratories. In the mid-1990s, the manufacturer began advertising that S.O.S pads had been made rust-resistant. In fact the pads were so well-protected against rust, and the pads lasted so much longer, that Miles removed the rust-inhibiting ingredients and ceased to advertise the pad's rust resistant quality. Later, in 1994 Miles sold the brand to Clorox.

== See also ==
- Brillo Pad
