= Deodorizing toilet seat =

Toilet seat with integrated air freshner

A deodorizing toilet seat is a toilet seat that comes with integrated air purifier and air freshener solutions to combat bad odors.

== Examples ==
Breeza

Brondell's Breeza activates automatically using a sensor. It captures odours at the source through an intake and quiet fan, purifies the air with an odor-absorbing activated carbon replaceable filter, and freshens the air with a fragrant vent. It is powered by two D-cell batteries, which last up to 9 months. It was pulled out of the market in 2011, due to high manufacturing costs and low demand.

Swash 1000

Brondell's Swash 1000 features an automatically activated carbon deodorizer which can suck the air from the toilet bowl and blow it through a catalyst wall of activated charcoal that absorbs odors. By pressing the deodorize button, it will run on high for approximately 1 minute. Besides the deodorize function, the Swash 1000 also has features that are common among electronic bidets, such as posterior wash, feminine wash, self-cleaning nozzle, nozzle position adjustment, adjustable water pressure, water and drying temperature setting, oscillating setting, heated seat and others.

== Alternatives ==
The Eliminator is a small suction fan with an activated carbon filter cartridge that is placed within the flush tank. It works by drawing air from the bowl, thus preventing odors from rising and wafting from the toilet bowl into the bathroom when the toilet is in use. The odors are drawn upwards through the independent overflow pipe within the cistern and then pass through the activated carbon filter, where they are totally eliminated. It is fully automatic with a robust auto sensor system as standard and comes complete with an AC/DC mains adapter or alternatively with a rechargeable battery pack. In 2015, The Eliminator was rebranded as The Odorless and started a Kickstarter project. It successfully raised $33,633 of its pledged of $27,000 goal.

== See also ==
- Automatic self-clean toilet seat
- Automatic deodorizer dispenser
