= Air sanitizer =

An air sanitizer is a sanitizer that acts on airborne microorganisms, including bacteria, fungi, and viruses, in households, institutions, and/or commercial environments.

Unlike air purifiers, which filter or otherwise trap particles within an air circulator, air sanitizers act on airborne microorganisms in open interior air space. A sneeze- or cough-generated pathogenic aerosol will take significant time to be treated by a circulating air purifier simply because air circulators are unable to treat all air in the room simultaneously. Air circulators treat a fractional room volume per unit time and exhaust the treated air back into the room, resulting in fractional air dilution. By contrast, air sanitizers that are maintained at a sufficient and homogeneous concentration within the interior air space provide simultaneous treatment of the entire interior air space volume but are not able to remove particles, including allergens. Air purifiers and air sanitizers are therefore complementary air treatment solutions. Air sanitizers are not air fresheners, which add fragrance to the air.

The vapors of some glycols, including triethylene glycol, can act as an air sanitizer. According to the United States Environmental Protection Agency, "There is considerable evidence that glycol vapors produce significant decreases in numbers of viable airborne bacteria under relatively wide conditions of relative humidity and temperature when properly and continuously dispensed by a vaporizing device so as to maintain suitable concentrations in the air in enclosed spaces."

== See also ==
- Indoor bioaerosol
