= Air pollution in Bhiwadi =

The pollution in Bhiwadi, according to IQAir, is the most polluted in the world. As of Central Pollution Control Board, It becomes most polluted city during Diwali in India. The pollution level was ranked fourth in 2021. It has the air quality index of 106.2 in 2021 and 228 in 2022. It is also the most polluted city in India whose pollution is more than air pollution in Delhi. The PM 2.5 of this city is twenty times more than the maximum level recommended by the World Health Organization. In November 2022, the air quality index of Bhiwadi is 412.

== Cause ==
The main cause of this pollution is because of the 2,000 factories established in the city.

== Response ==
To prevent the pollution, Government of Rajasthan sprinkles 200 thousand liters water daily in the road between October and November every year which settles the dust. The aim of sprinkling water on the road is 25 million liters.
