= Neil Drossman =

American advertising writer

Neil Drossman (February 26, 1940 - November 25, 2023) was an American advertising writer. He was known for writing memorable witty catchphrases. He wrote successful ad campaigns for Meow Mix cat food, Einstein Moomjy Carpets, Air Wick air freshener, Chemical Bank, and Teacher’s scotch.
