= Sam Sofer =

Iranian-born American scientist (born 1945)

Sam Sofer (born 1945) is an Iranian-born American scientist who specializes in biological processes and bioreactor design, with applications in medicine, energy, and the environment. He is the creator of biological air and water cleaners that use immobilized cell technology, and of various biomedical instruments and test protocols related to boosting the immune system to fight disease.

== Early life ==
Sofer was born Samir Salim Sofer, in Tehran, Iran. He attended the American Community School for his primary and secondary education.

== Education ==
Upon secondary school graduation Sofer attended the University of Utah, where he earned an Honors Bachelor of Science in Chemical Engineering. Sofer went on to get a Masters of Engineering from Texas A & M University, and a PhD in Chemical Engineering from the University of Texas at Austin. His PhD dissertation was titled 'Continuous production of drug metabolites by insolubilized hepatic microsomal oxidase'.

== Career ==
Sofer has been Professor and Director, Chemical Engineering and Materials Science at the University of Oklahoma; and Research Chair Professor of Biotechnology at the New Jersey Institute of Technology.

Sofer has industrial experience as a US chemical plant engineer, and has the following patents: Method and Spiral Bioreactor for Processing Feedstocks, U.S. Patent 6,916,630 B2, Jul. 12, 2005; Immune and Oxygen System Measuring and Drug Screening Method and Apparatus U.S. and International patents pending, 2012.

Sofer is currently the President of Air & Water Solutions (NJ) and of ReGen Technology LLC (NM), all of which specialize in biological processes and bioreactor design.

== Technology applications ==
Sam Sofer's Spiral Bioreactor patent for air purification technology has been developed and industrialized and studied for the professional segment use by U-earth Biotech. Sara Zanni Environmental Engineer, U-earth Chief Science Officer until 2019 in cooperation with UNIBO, the university of Bologna, has published studies on the applications of AIRcel bioreactors derived by Sofer's patent, in the medical, industrial and commercial segment.

The system has been studied and research papers published in the industrial machining contest and in the waste treatment contest.
