= Bioaerosol =

Airborne particles containing living organisms

Bioaerosols (short for biological aerosols) are a subcategory of particles released from terrestrial and marine ecosystems into the atmosphere. They consist of both living and non-living components, such as fungi, pollen, bacteria and viruses. Common sources of bioaerosols include soil, water, and sewage.

Bioaerosols are typically introduced into the air via wind turbulence over a surface. Once in the atmosphere, they can be transported locally or globally: common wind patterns/strengths are responsible for local dispersal, while tropical storms and dust plumes can move bioaerosols between continents. Over ocean surfaces, bioaerosols are generated via sea spray and bubbles.

Bioaerosols can transmit microbial pathogens, endotoxins, and allergens to which humans are sensitive. A well-known case was the meningococcal meningitis outbreak in sub-Saharan Africa, which was linked to dust storms during dry seasons. Other outbreaks linked to dust events including Mycoplasma pneumonia and tuberculosis.

Another instance was an increase in human respiratory problems in the Caribbean that may have been caused by traces of heavy metals, microorganism bioaerosols, and pesticides transported via dust clouds passing over the Atlantic Ocean.

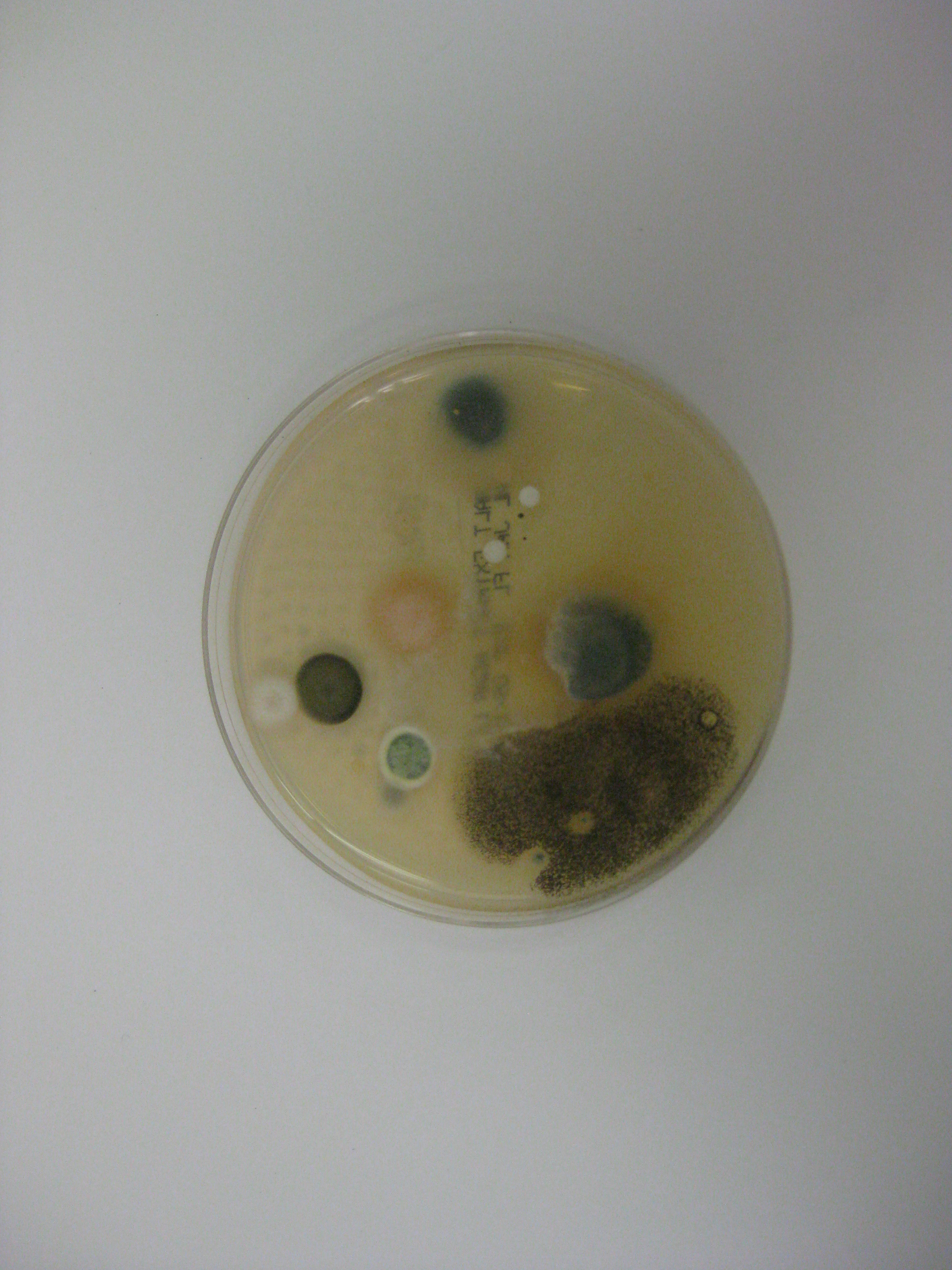
Common bioaerosol isolated from indoor environments

== Background ==
Charles Darwin was the first to observe the transport of dust particles but Louis Pasteur was the first to research microbes and their activity within the air. Prior to Pasteur's work, laboratory cultures were used to grow and isolate different bioaerosols.

Since not all microbes can be cultured, many were undetected before the development of DNA-based tools. Pasteur also developed experimental procedures for sampling bioaerosols and showed that more microbial activity occurred at lower altitudes and decreased at higher altitudes.

== Types of bioaerosols ==
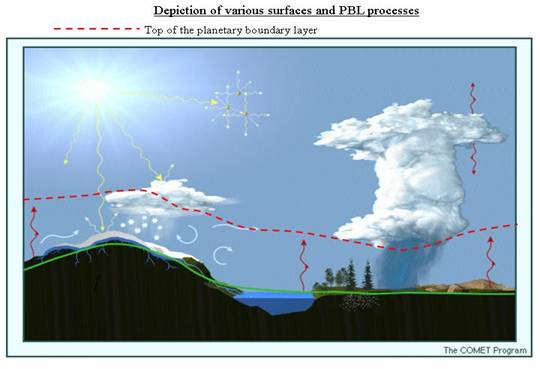
The planetary boundary layer

Bioaerosols include fungi, bacteria, viruses, and pollen. Their concentrations are greatest in the planetary boundary layer (PBL) and decrease with altitude. Survival rate of bioaerosols depends on a number of biotic and abiotic factors which include climatic conditions, ultraviolet (UV) light, temperature and humidity, as well as resources present within dust or clouds.

Bioaerosols found over marine environments primarily consist of bacteria, while those found over terrestrial environments are rich in bacteria, fungi and pollen. The dominance of particular bacteria and their nutrient sources are subject to change according to time and location.

Bioaerosols can range in size from 10 nanometer virus particles to 100 micrometers pollen grains. Pollen grains are the largest bioaerosols and are less likely to remain suspended in the air over a long period of time due to their weight.

Consequently, pollen particle concentration decreases more rapidly with height than smaller bioaerosols such as bacteria, fungi and possibly viruses, which may be able to survive in the upper troposphere. At present, there is little research on the specific altitude tolerance of different bioaerosols. However, scientists believe that atmospheric turbulence impacts where different bioaerosols may be found.

=== Fungi ===
Fungal cells usually die when they travel through the atmosphere due to the desiccating effects of higher altitudes. However, some particularly resilient fungal bioaerosols have been shown to survive in atmospheric transport despite exposure to severe UV light conditions. Although bioaerosol levels of fungal spores increase in higher humidity conditions, they can also be active in low humidity conditions and in most temperature ranges. Certain fungal bioaerosols even increase at relatively low levels of humidity.

=== Bacteria ===
Unlike other bioaerosols, bacteria are able to complete full reproductive cycles within the days or weeks that they survive in the atmosphere, making them a major component of the air biota ecosystem. These reproductive cycles support a currently unproven theory that bacteria bioaerosols form communities in an atmospheric ecosystem. The survival of bacteria depends on water droplets from fog and clouds that provide bacteria with nutrients and protection from UV light. The four known bacterial groupings that are abundant in aeromicrobial environments around the world include Bacillota, Actinomycetota, Pseudomonadota, and Bacteroidota.

=== Viruses ===
The air transports viruses and other pathogens. Since viruses are smaller than other bioaerosols, they have the potential to travel further distances. In one simulation, a virus and a fungal spore were simultaneously released from the top of a building; the spore traveled only 150 meters while the virus traveled almost 200,000 horizontal kilometers.

In one study, aerosols (<5 μm) containing SARS-CoV-1 and SARS-CoV-2 were generated by an atomizer and fed into a Goldberg drum to create an aerosolized environment. The inoculum yielded cycle thresholds between 20 and 22, similar to those observed in human upper and lower respiratory tract samples. SARS-CoV-2 remained viable in aerosols for 3 hours, with a decrease in infection titre similar to SARS-CoV-1. The half-life of both viruses in aerosols was 1.1 to 1.2 hours on average. The results suggest that the transmission of both viruses by aerosols is plausible, as they can remain viable and infectious in suspended aerosols for hours and on surfaces for up to days.

=== Pollen ===
Despite being larger and heavier than other bioaerosols, some studies show that pollen can be transported thousands of kilometers. They are a major source of wind-dispersed allergens, coming particularly from seasonal releases from grasses and trees. Tracking distance, transport, resources, and deposition of pollen to terrestrial and marine environments are useful for interpreting pollen records.

== Collection ==
The main tools used to collect bioaerosols are collection plates, electrostatic collectors, mass spectrometers, and impactors, other methods are used but are more experimental in nature. Polycarbonate (PC) filters have had the most accurate bacterial sampling success when compared to other PC filter options.

=== Single-stage impactors ===
To collect bioaerosols falling within a specific size range, impactors can be stacked to capture the variation of particulate matter (PM). For example, a PM_{10} filter lets smaller sizes pass through. This is similar to the size of a human hair. Particulates are deposited onto the slides, agar plates, or tape at the base of the impactor. The Hirst spore trap samples at 10 liters/minute (LPM) and has a wind vane to always sample in the direction of wind flow. Collected particles are impacted onto a vertical glass slide greased with petroleum.

Variations such as the 7-day recording volumetric spore trap have been designed for continuous sampling using a slowly rotating drum that deposits impacted material onto a coated plastic tape. The airborne bacteria sampler can sample at rates up to 700 LPM, allowing for large samples to be collected in a short sampling time. Biological material is impacted and deposited onto an agar lined Petri dish, allowing cultures to develop.

=== Cascade impactors ===
Similar to single-stage impactors in collection methods, cascade impactors have multiple size cuts (PM_{10}, PM_{2.5}), allowing for bioaerosols to separate according to size. Separating biological material by aerodynamic diameter is useful due to size ranges being dominated by specific types of organisms (bacteria exist range from 1–20 micrometers and pollen from 10–100 micrometers). The Andersen line of cascade impactors are most widely used to test air particles.

=== Cyclones ===
A cyclone sampler consists of a circular chamber with the aerosol stream entering through one or more tangential nozzles. Like an impactor, a cyclone sampler depends upon the inertia of the particle to cause it to deposit on the sampler wall as the air stream curves around inside the chamber. Also like an impactor, the collection efficiency depends upon the flow rate. Cyclones are less prone to particle bounce than impactors and can collect larger quantities of material. They also may provide a more gentle collection than impactors, which can improve the recovery of viable microorganisms. However, cyclones tend to have collection efficiency curves that are less sharp than impactors, and it is simpler to design a compact cascade impactor compared to a cascade of cyclone samplers.

=== Impingers ===
Instead of collecting onto a greased substrate or agar plate, impingers have been developed to impact bioaerosols into liquids, such as deionized water or phosphate buffer solution. Collection efficiencies of impingers are shown by Ehrlich et al. (1966) to be generally higher than similar single stage impactor designs. Commercially available impingers include the AGI-30 (Ace Glass Inc.) and Biosampler (SKC, Inc).

=== Electrostatic precipitators ===
Electrostatic precipitators, ESPs, have recently gained renewed interest for bioaerosol sampling due to their highly efficient particle removal efficiencies and gentler sampling method as compared with impinging. ESPs charge and remove incoming aerosol particles from an air stream by employing a non-uniform electrostatic field between two electrodes, and a high field strength. This creates a region of high density ions, a corona discharge, which charges incoming aerosol droplets, and the electric field deposits the charges particles onto a collection surface.

Since biological particles are typically analysed using liquid-based assays (PCR, immunoassays, viability assay) it is preferable to sample directly into a liquid volume for downstream analysis. For example, Pardon et al. show sampling of aerosols down to a microfluidic air-liquid interface, and Ladhani et al., show sampling of airborne Influenza down to a small liquid droplet. The use of low-volume liquids is ideal for minimising sample dilution, and has the potential to be couple to lab-on-chip technologies for rapid point-of-care analysis.

=== Filters ===
Filters are often used to collect bioaerosols because of their simplicity and low cost. Filter collection is especially useful for personal bioaerosol sampling since they are light and unobtrusive. Filters can be preceded by a size-selective inlet, such as a cyclone or impactor, to remove larger particles and provide size-classification of the bioaerosol particles. Aerosol filters are often described using the term "pore size" or "equivalent pore diameter". Note that the filter pore size does NOT indicate the minimum particle size that will be collected by the filter; in fact, aerosol filters generally will collect particles much smaller than the nominal pore size.

== Transport mechanisms ==
=== Ejection of bioaerosols into the atmosphere ===
Bioaerosols are typically introduced into the air via wind turbulence over a surface. Once airborne they typically remain in the planetary boundary layer (PBL), but in some cases reach the upper troposphere and stratosphere. Once in the atmosphere, they can be transported locally or globally: common wind patterns/strengths are responsible for local dispersal, while tropical storms and dust plumes can move bioaerosols between continents. Over ocean surfaces, bioaerosols are generated via sea spray and bubbles.

=== Small scale transport via clouds ===
Knowledge of bioaerosols has shaped our understanding of microorganisms and the differentiation between microbes, including airborne pathogens. In the 1970s, a breakthrough occurred in atmospheric physics and microbiology when ice nucleating bacteria were identified.

The highest concentration of bioaerosols is near the Earth's surface in the PBL. Here wind turbulence causes vertical mixing, bringing particles from the ground into the atmosphere. Bioaerosols introduced to the atmosphere can form clouds, which are then blown to other geographic locations and precipitate out as rain, hail, or snow. Increased levels of bioaerosols have been observed in rain forests during and after rain events. Bacteria and phytoplankton from marine environments have been linked to cloud formation.

However, for this same reason, bioaerosols cannot be transported long distances in the PBL since the clouds will eventually precipitate them out. Furthermore, it would take additional turbulence or convection at the upper limits of the PBL to inject bioaerosols into the troposphere where they may transported larger distances as part of tropospheric flow. This limits the concentration of bioaerosols at these altitudes.

Cloud droplets, ice crystals, and precipitation use bioaerosols as a nucleus where water or crystals can form or hold onto their surface. These interactions show that air particles can change the hydrological cycle, weather conditions, and weathering around the world. Those changes can lead to effects such as desertification which is magnified by climate shifts. Bioaerosols also intermix when pristine air and smog meet, changing visibility and/or air quality.

=== Large scale transport via dust plumes ===
Satellite images show that storms over Australian, African, and Asian deserts create dust plumes which can carry dust to altitudes of over 5 kilometers above the Earth's surface. This mechanism transports the material thousands of kilometers away, even moving it between continents. Multiple studies have supported the theory that bioaerosols can be carried along with dust. One study concluded that a type of airborne bacteria present in a particular desert dust was found at a site 1,000 kilometers downwind.

Possible global scale highways for bioaerosols in dust include:

- Storms over Northern Africa picking up dust, which can then be blown across the Atlantic to the Americas, or north to Europe. For transatlantic transport, there is a seasonal shift in the destination of the dust: North America during the summer, and South America during the winter.
- Dust from the Gobi and Taklamakan deserts is transported to North America, mainly during the Northern Hemisphere spring.
- Dust from Australia is carried out into the Pacific Ocean, with the possibility of being deposited in New Zealand.

=== Community dispersal ===
Bioaerosol transport and distribution is not consistent around the globe. While bioaerosols may travel thousands of kilometers before deposition, their ultimate distance of travel and direction is dependent on meteorological, physical, and chemical factors. The branch of biology that studies the dispersal of these particles is called Aerobiology. One study generated an airborne bacteria/fungi map of the United States from observational measurements, resulting community profiles of these bioaerosols were connected to soil pH, mean annual precipitation, net primary productivity, and mean annual temperature, among other factors.

== Biogeochemical impacts ==
Bioaerosols impact a variety of biogeochemical systems on earth including, but not limited to atmospheric, terrestrial, and marine ecosystems. As long-standing as these relationships are, the topic of bioaerosols is not very well-known. Bioaerosols can affect organisms in a multitude of ways including influencing the health of living organisms through allergies, disorders, and disease. Additionally, the distribution of pollen and spore bioaerosols contribute to the genetic diversity of organisms across multiple habitats.

=== Cloud formation ===
A variety of bioaerosols may contribute to cloud condensation nuclei or cloud ice nuclei, possible bioaerosol components are living or dead cells, cell fragments, hyphae, pollen, or spores. Cloud formation and precipitation are key features of many hydrologic cycles to which ecosystems are tied. In addition, global cloud cover is a significant factor in the overall radiation budget and therefore, temperature of the Earth.

Bioaerosols make up a small fraction of the total cloud condensation nuclei in the atmosphere (between 0.001% and 0.01%) so their global impact (i.e. radiation budget) is questionable. However, there are specific cases where bioaerosols may form a significant fraction of the clouds in an area. These include:

- Areas where there is cloud formation at temperatures over −15 °C since some bacteria have developed proteins which allow them to nucleate ice at higher temperatures.
- Areas over vegetated regions or under remote conditions where the air is less impacted by anthropogenic activity.
- Near surface air in remote marine regions like the Southern Ocean where sea spray may be more prevalent than dust transported from continents.

The collection of bioaerosol particles on a surface is called deposition. The removal of these particles from the atmosphere affects human health in regard to air quality and respiratory systems.

=== Alpine lakes in Spain ===
Alpine lakes located in the Central Pyrenees region of northeast Spain are unaffected by anthropogenic factors making these oligotrophic lakes ideal indicators for sediment input and environmental change. Dissolved organic matter and nutrients from dust transport can aid bacteria with growth and production in low nutrient waters. Within the collected samples of one study, a high diversity of airborne microorganisms were detected and had strong similarities to Mauritian soils despite Saharan dust storms occurring at the time of detection.

=== Affected ocean species ===
The types and sizes of bioaerosols vary in marine environments and occur largely because of wet-discharges caused by changes in osmotic pressure or surface tension. Some types of marine originated bioaerosols excrete dry-discharges of fungal spores that are transported by the wind.

One instance of impact on marine species was the 1983 die off of Caribbean sea fans and sea urchins that correlated with dust storms originating in Africa. This correlation was determined by the work of microbiologists and a Total Ozone Mapping Spectrometer, which identified bacteria, viral, and fungal bioaerosols in the dust clouds that were tracked over the Atlantic Ocean. Another instance in of this occurred in 1997 when El Niño possibly impacted seasonal trade wind patterns from Africa to Barbados, resulting in similar die offs. Modeling instances like these can contribute to more accurate predictions of future events.

== Spread of diseases ==
The aerosolization of bacteria in dust contributes heavily to the transport of bacterial pathogens. A well-known case of disease outbreak by bioaerosol was the meningococcal meningitis outbreak in sub-Saharan Africa, which was linked to dust storms during dry seasons.

Other outbreaks have been reportedly linked to dust events including Mycoplasma pneumonia and tuberculosis. Another instance of bioaerosol-spread health issues was an increase in human respiratory problems for Caribbean-region residents that may have been caused by traces of heavy metals, microorganism bioaerosols, and pesticides transported via dust clouds passing over the Atlantic Ocean.

Common sources of bioaerosols include soil, water, and sewage. Bioaerosols can transmit microbial pathogens, endotoxins, and allergens and can excrete both endotoxins and exotoxins. Exotoxins can be particularly dangerous when transported through the air and distribute pathogens to which humans are sensitive. Cyanobacteria are particularly prolific in their pathogen distribution and are abundant in both terrestrial and aquatic environments.

== Future research ==
The potential role of bioaerosols in climate change offers an abundance of research opportunities. Specific areas of study include monitoring bioaerosol impacts on different ecosystems and using meteorological data to forecast ecosystem changes. Determining global interactions is possible through methods like collecting air samples, DNA extraction from bioaerosols, and PCR amplification.

Developing more efficient modelling systems will reduce the spread of human disease and benefit economic and ecologic factors. An atmospheric modeling tool called the Atmospheric Dispersion Modelling System (ADMS 3) is currently in use for this purpose. The ADMS 3 uses computational fluid dynamics (CFD) to locate potential problem areas, minimizing the spread of harmful bioaerosol pathogens include tracking occurrences.

Agroecosystems have an array of potential future research avenues within bioaerosols. Identification of deteriorated soils may identify sources of plant or animal pathogens.

== See also ==
- Mycotoxin
- Indoor air quality
- Indoor bioaerosol
- Mold growth, assessment, and remediation
- Mold health issues
- Sick building syndrome
