= Air purifier =

Device that removes contaminants from the air in a room

An air purifier or air cleaner is a device which removes contaminants from the air in a room to improve indoor air quality. These devices are commonly marketed to people with allergies or asthma, and at reducing or eliminating second-hand tobacco smoke.

Commercial grade air purifiers are manufactured as either small stand-alone units or larger units that can be affixed to an air handler unit (AHU) or to an HVAC unit found in the medical, industrial, and commercial industries. Air purifiers may also be used in industry to remove impurities from air before processing. Pressure swing adsorbers or other adsorption techniques are typically used for this.

Homemade, do-it-yourself air cleaners using air filters are low-cost, high performance alternatives to commercial, stand-alone portable air cleaners.

== History ==
In 1830, a patent was awarded to Charles Anthony Deane for a device comprising a copper helmet with an attached flexible collar and garment. A long leather hose attached to the rear of the helmet was to be used to supply air, the original concept being that it would be pumped using a double bellows. A short pipe allowed breathed air to escape. The garment was to be constructed from leather or airtight cloth, secured by straps. In the 1860s, John Stenhouse filed two patents applying the absorbent properties of wood charcoal to air purification (patents 19 July 1860 and 21 May 1867), thereby creating the first practical respirator.

In 1871, the physicist John Tyndall wrote about his invention, a fireman's respirator, as a result of a combination of protective features of the Stenhouse's respirator and other breathing devices. This invention was later described in 1875.

In the 1950s, HEPA filters were commercialized as highly efficient air filters, after being put to use in the 1940s in the United States' Manhattan Project to control airborne radioactive contaminants.

The first residential HEPA filter was reportedly sold in 1963 by brothers Manfred and Klaus Hammes in Germany, who created the Incen Air Corporation which was the precursor to the IQAir corporation.

== Use and benefits ==
Dust, pollen, pet dander, mold spores, and dust mite feces can act as allergens, triggering allergies in sensitive people. Smoke particles and volatile organic compounds (VOCs) can pose a risk to health. Exposure to various components such as VOCs increases the likelihood of experiencing symptoms of sick building syndrome.

=== COVID-19 ===
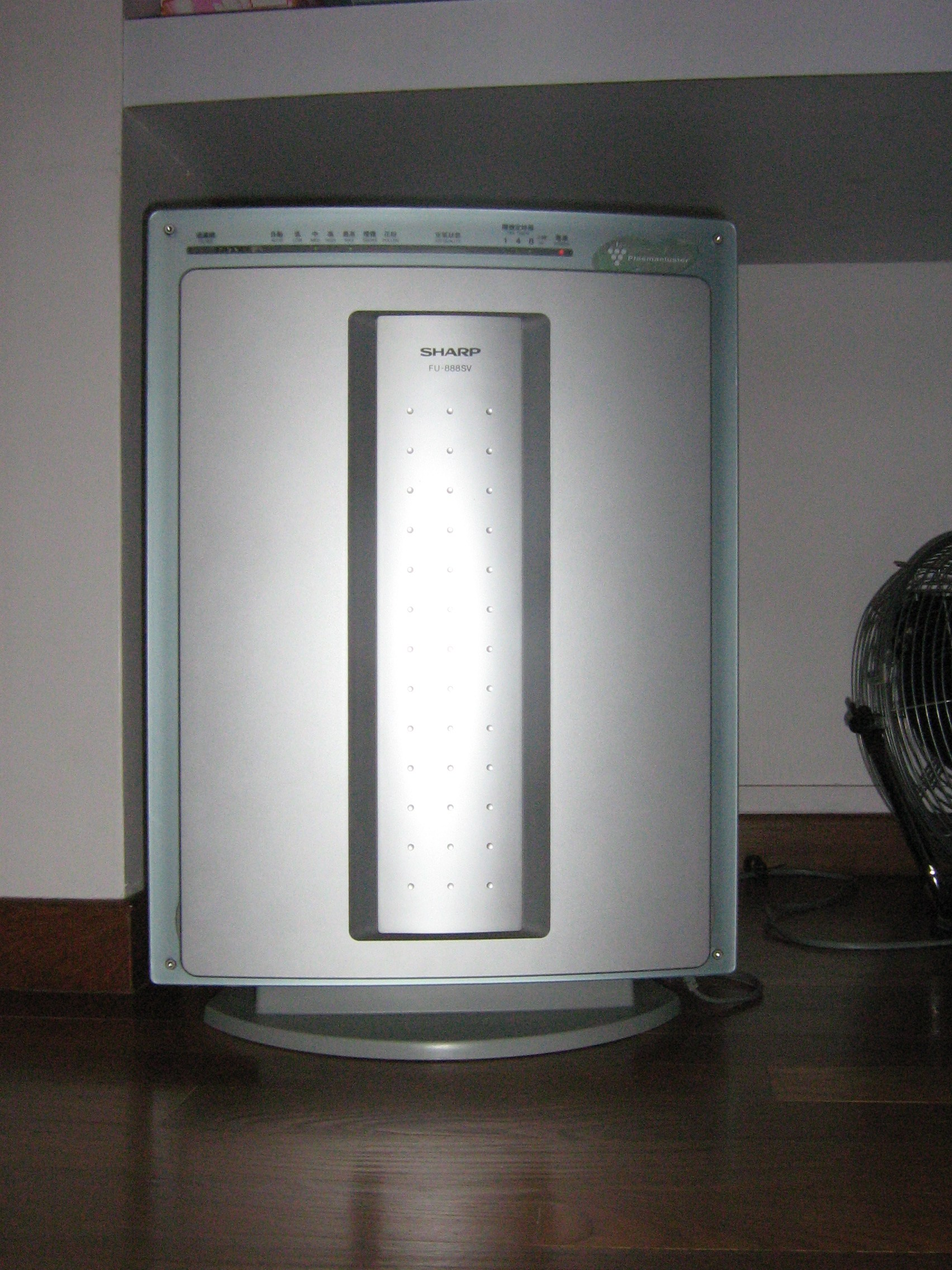
A Sharp FU-888SV Plasmacluster air purifier.

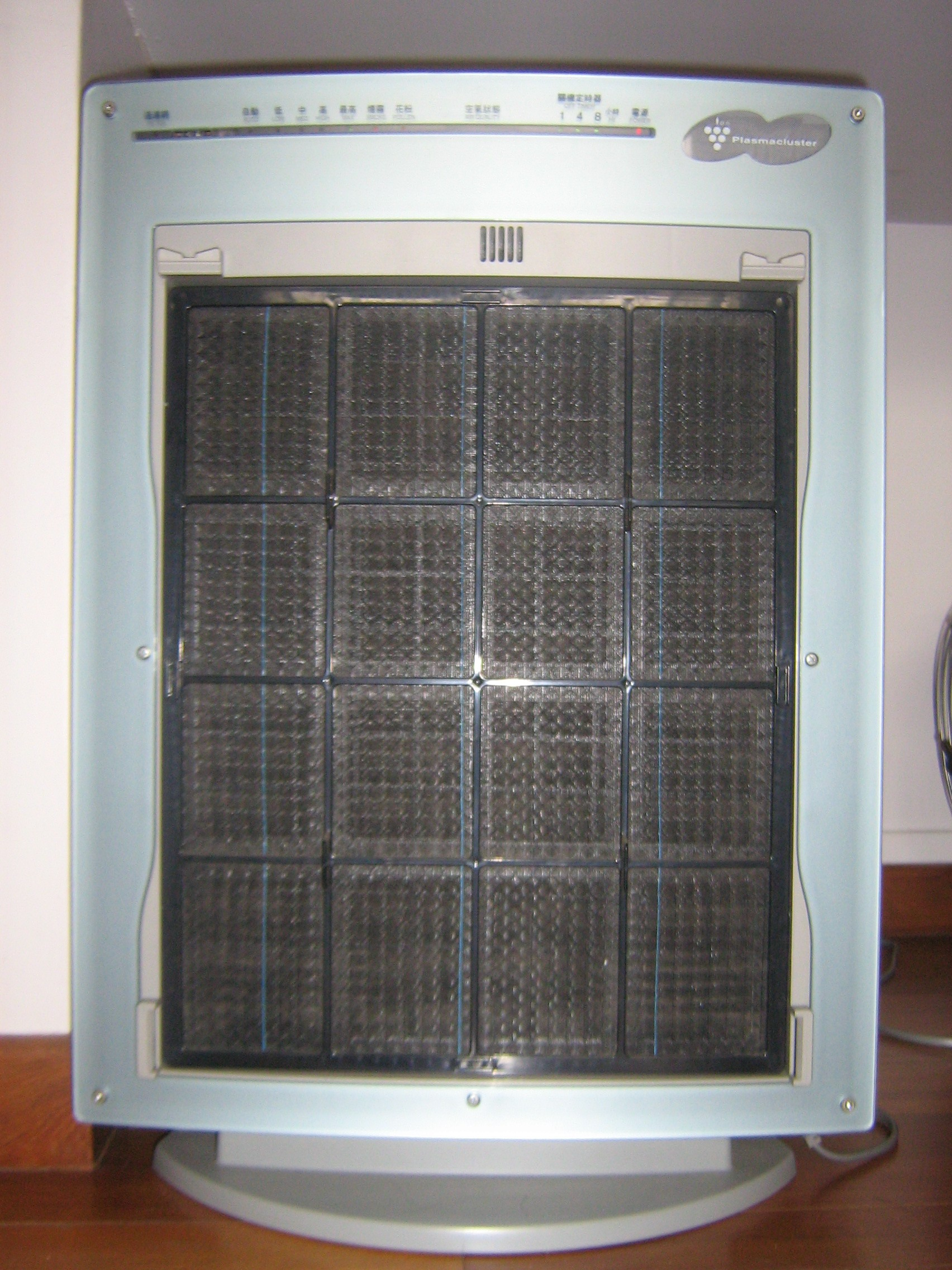
The same air purifier, cover removed.

Joseph Allen, director of the Healthy Buildings program at Harvard's School of Public Health, recommended in 2020 that school classrooms use an air purifier with a HEPA filter as a way to reduce transmission of COVID-19 virus, saying "Portables with a high-efficiency HEPA filter and sized for the appropriate room can capture 99.97 percent of airborne particles."

One fluid dynamic modelling study from 2021 suggests that operating air purifiers or air ventilation systems in confined spaces, such as an elevator, during their occupancy by multiple people leads to air circulation effects that could, theoretically, enhance viral transmission. However, real-life testing of portable HEPA/UV air filters in COVID-19 wards in hospital demonstrated complete elimination of air-borne SARS-CoV-2. This report also showed a significant reduction in other bacteria, fungal and viral bioaerosol, suggesting that portable filters such as this may be able to prevent not only nosocomial spread of COVID-19 but also other hospital-acquired infections. Another study comparing paired wards with and without air purifying devices found an association between the deployment of air purifying devices and reduced nosocomial transmission of SARS-CoV-2, but the size of the effect and uncertainty around it were high. Acceptability of the devices in the hospital environment was imperfect, and as other restrictions such as masking and room occupancy were reduced so too did compliance with the air purifying devices.

== Purifying techniques ==
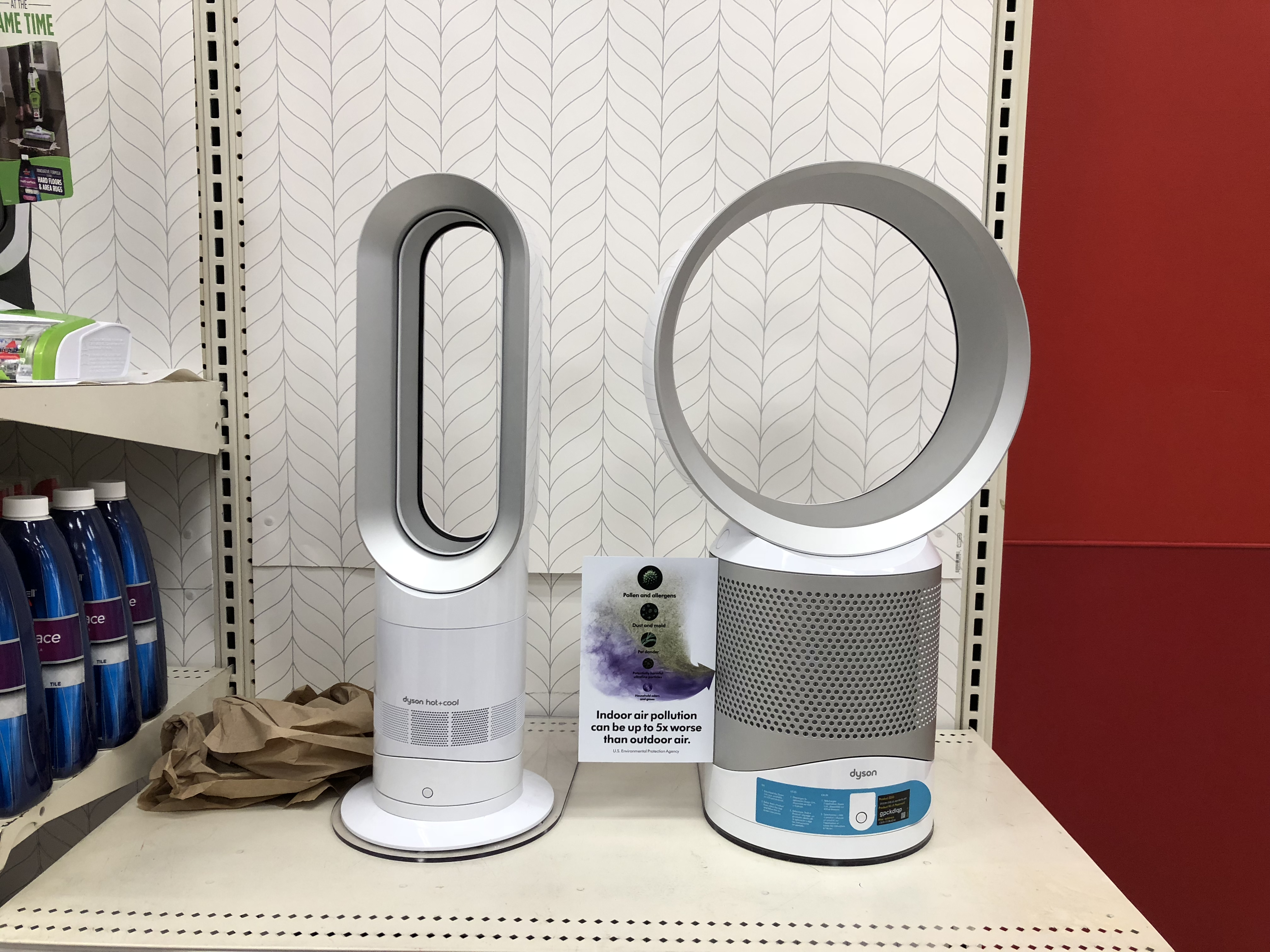
Air-purifiers with air flow generated by bladeless fan. Some models can act as heaters or humidifiers and may feature oscillation and adjustment of air flow angle (up and down).

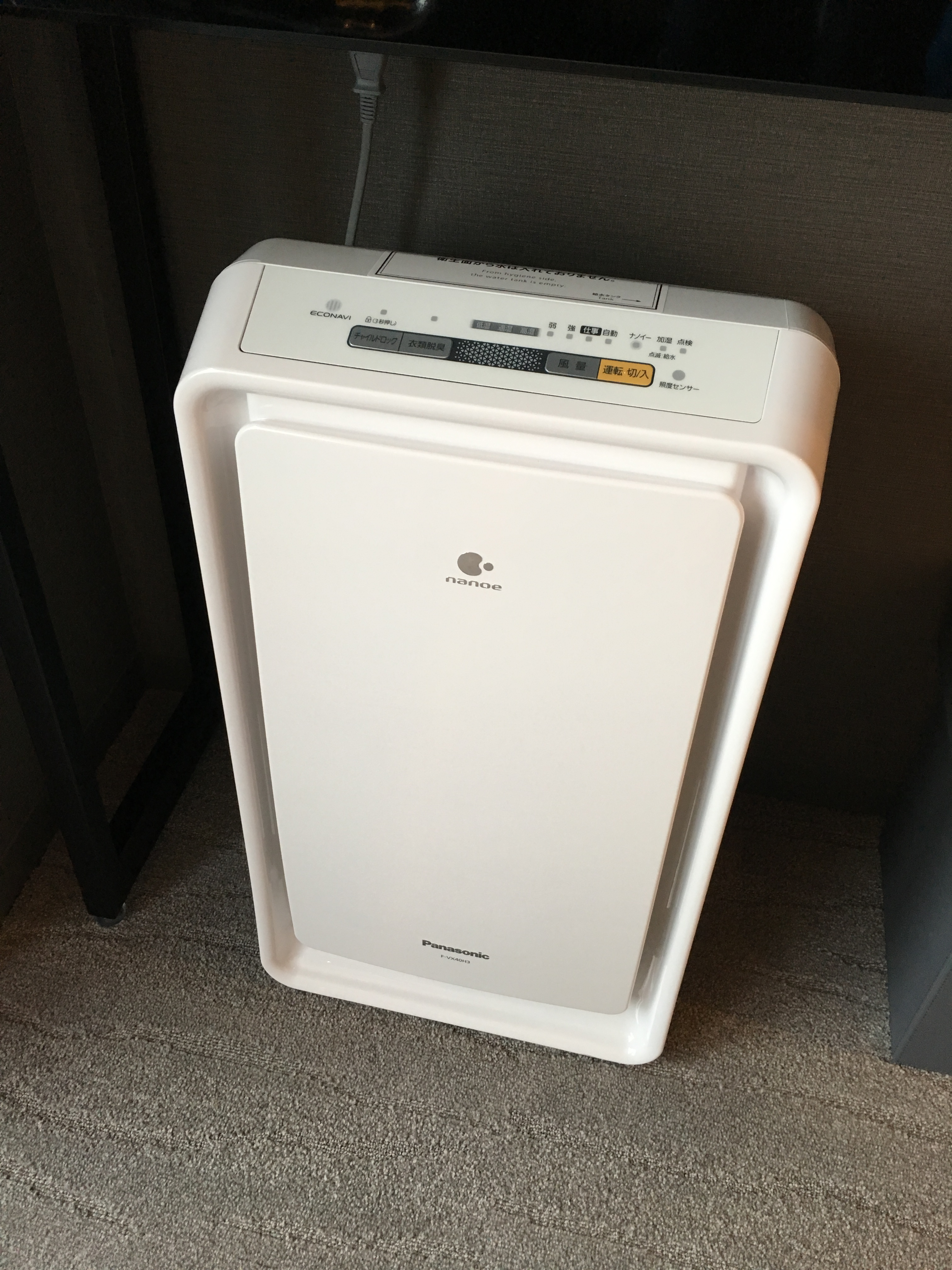
An air purifier placed under a table

There are two types of air purifying technologies, active and passive. Active air purifiers release negatively charged ions into the air, causing pollutants to stick to surfaces, while passive air purification units use air filters to remove pollutants. Passive purifiers are more efficient since all the dust and particulate matter is permanently removed from the air and collected in the filters. Several different processes of varying effectiveness can be used to purify air. As of 2005, the most common methods were high-efficiency particulate air (HEPA) filters and ultraviolet germicidal irradiation (UVGI).

=== Filtration ===
Air filter purification traps airborne particles by size exclusion. Air is forced through a filter and particles are physically captured by the filter. Various filters exist notably including:

- High-efficiency particulate arrestance (HEPA) filters remove at least 99.97% of 0.3-micrometer particles and are usually more effective at removing larger and smaller particles. HEPA purifiers, which filter all the air going into a clean room, must be arranged so that no air bypasses the HEPA filter. In dusty environments, a HEPA filter may follow an easily cleaned conventional filter (prefilter) which removes coarser impurities so that the HEPA filter needs cleaning or replacing less frequently. HEPA filters do not generate ozone or harmful byproducts in the course of operation.
- Filter HVAC at MERV 14 or above are rated to remove airborne particles of 0.3 micrometers or larger. A high-efficiency MERV 14 filter has a capture rate of at least 75% for particles between 0.3 and 1.0 micrometers. Although the capture rate of a MERV filter is lower than that of a HEPA filter, a central air system can move significantly more air in the same period of time. Using a high-grade MERV filter can be more effective than using a high-powered HEPA machine at a fraction of the initial capital expenditure. Unfortunately, most furnace filters are slid in place without an airtight seal, which allows air to pass around the filters. This problem is worse for the higher-efficiency MERV filters because of the increase in air resistance. Higher-efficiency MERV filters are usually denser and increase air resistance in the central system, requiring a greater air pressure drop and consequently increasing energy costs.
- There is ongoing research to enable viable and effective biocide treated air filters (i.e. air filters coated with antimicrobial agents) for preventing the spread of airborne pathogens.

=== Other methods ===
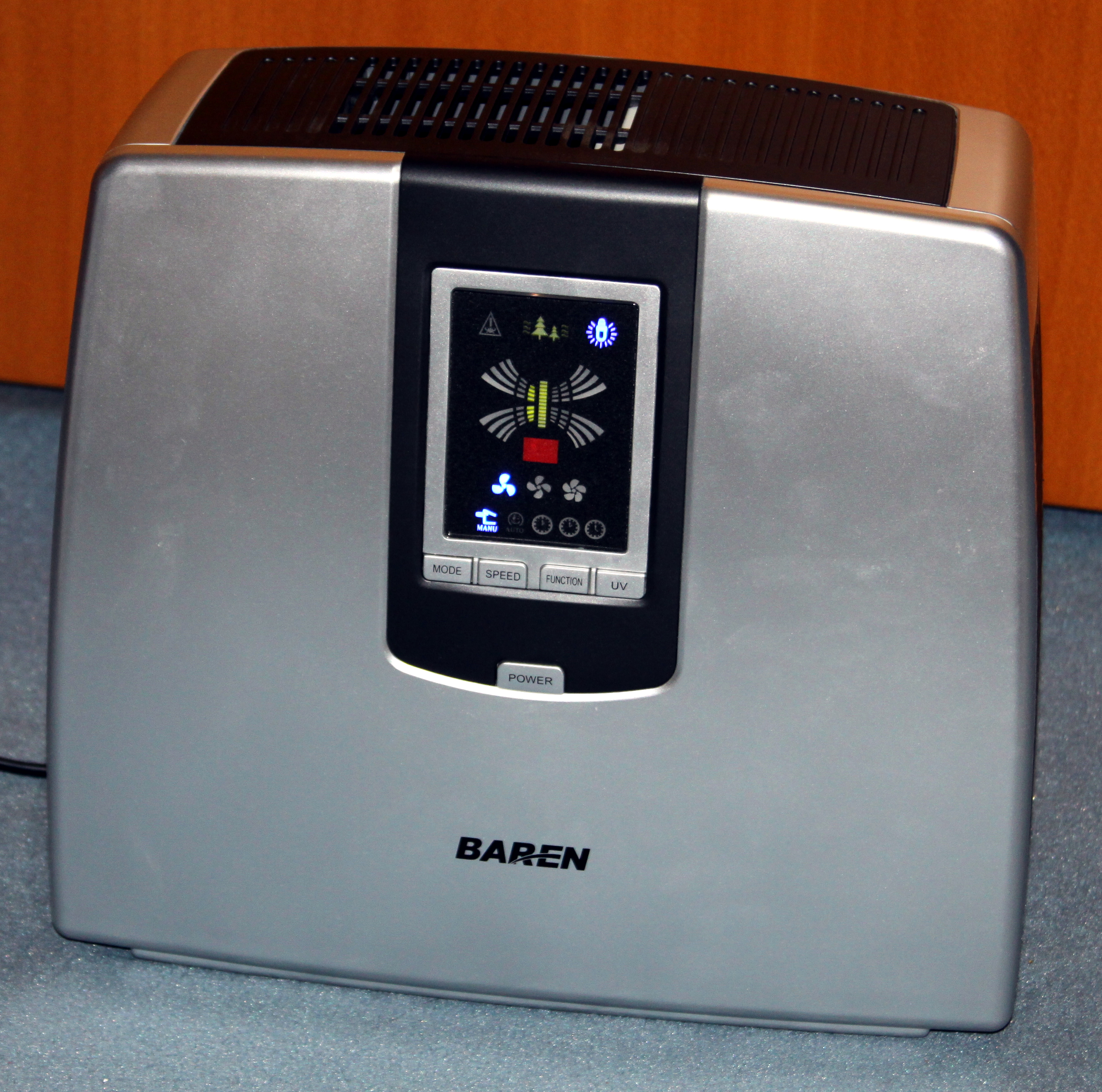
An air purifier which can use HEPA, ionization, PCO, UVGI, and ozone generation

- Ultraviolet germicidal irradiation - UVGI can be used to sterilize air that passes UV lamps via forced air. Air purification UVGI systems can be freestanding units with shielded UV lamps that use a fan to force air past the UV light. Other systems are installed in forced air systems so that the circulation for the premises moves micro-organisms past the lamps. Key to this form of sterilization is the placement of the UV lamps and a good filtration system to remove the dead micro-organisms. For example, forced air systems by design impede line-of-sight, thus creating areas of the environment that will be shaded from the UV light. However, a UV lamp placed at the coils and drain pan of the cooling system will keep micro-organisms from forming in these naturally damp places. The most effective method for treating the air rather than the coils is in-line duct systems, these systems are placed in the center of the duct and parallel to the airflow.
- Activated carbon is a porous material that can adsorb volatile chemicals on a molecular basis, but does not remove larger particles. The adsorption process when using activated carbon must reach equilibrium thus it may be difficult to completely remove contaminants. Activated carbon is merely a process of changing contaminants from a gaseous phase to a solid phase, when aggravated or disturbed contaminants can be regenerated in indoor air sources. Activated carbon can be used at room temperature and has a long history of commercial use. It is normally used in conjunction with other filter technology, especially with HEPA. Other materials can also absorb chemicals but at a higher cost.
- Polarized-media electronic air cleaners use active electronically enhanced media to combine elements of both electronic air cleaners and passive mechanical filters. Most polarized-media electronic air cleaners use safe 24-volt DC voltage to establish the polarizing electric field. Most airborne particles have a charge and many are even bi-polar. As airborne particles pass through the electric field the polarized field re-orients the particle to adhere to a disposable fiber media pad. Ultra-fine particles (UFPs) that are not collected on their initial pass through the media pad are polarized and agglomerate to other particles, odor and VOC molecules and are collected on subsequent passes. The collection efficiency varies significantly by particle size. The efficiency of polarized-media electronic air cleaners increases as they load, providing high-efficiency filtration, with air resistance typically equal to or less than passive filters. Polarized-media technology is non-ionizing, which means no ozone is produced.
- Photocatalytic oxidation (PCO) is an emerging technology in the HVAC industry. In addition to the prospect of Indoor Air Quality (IAQ) benefits, it has the added potential for limiting the introduction of unconditioned air to the building space, thereby presenting an opportunity to achieve energy savings over previous prescriptive designs. As of May 2009 there was no more disputable concern raised by the Lawrence Berkeley National Laboratory data that PCO may significantly increase the amount of formaldehyde in real indoor environments. As with other advanced technologies, sound engineering principles and practices should be employed by the HVAC designer to ensure proper application of the technology. Photocatalytic oxidation systems are able to completely oxidize and degrade organic contaminants. For example, Volatile Organic Compounds found low concentrations within a few hundred ppmv or less are the most likely to be completely oxidized. PCO uses short-wave ultraviolet light (UVC), commonly used for sterilization, to energize the catalyst (usually titanium dioxide (TiO_{2})) and oxidize bacteria and viruses. PCO in-duct units can be mounted to an existing forced-air HVAC system. PCO is not a filtering technology, as it does not trap or remove particles. Like polarized electric media, the effectiveness of PCO approaches are highly dependent on particle size, and system geometries must be tailored accordingly. PCO systems are sometimes coupled with other filtering technologies for air purification. UV sterilization bulbs must be replaced about once a year; manufacturers may require periodic replacement as a condition of warranty. Photocatalytic Oxidation systems often have high commercial costs.
  - A related technology relevant to air purification is photoelectrochemical oxidation (PECO) Photoelectrochemical oxidation. While technically a type of PCO, PECO involves electrochemical interactions among the catalyst material and reactive species (e.g., through emplacement of cathodic materials) to improve quantum efficiency; in this way, it is possible to use lower energy UVA radiation as the light source and yet achieve improved effectiveness.
- Ionizer purifiers use charged electrical surfaces or needles to generate electrically charged air or gas ions. These ions attach to airborne particles which are then electrostatically attracted to a charged collector plate. This mechanism produces trace amounts of ozone and other oxidants as by-products. Most ionizers produce less than 0.05 ppm of ozone, an industrial safety standard. There are two major subdivisions: the fanless ionizer and fan-based ionizer. Fanless ionizers are noiseless and use little power, but are less efficient at air purification. Fan-based ionizers clean and distribute air much faster. Permanently mounted home and industrial ionizer purifiers are called electrostatic precipitators.
- Plasma air purifiers are a form of ionizing air purifier. Instead of precipitating particles on a plate, they are primarily intended to destroy volatile organic compounds, bacteria, and viruses by chemical reactions with generated ions. While promising in laboratory conditions, their usefulness and safety has not been established in air purification.
- Far-UVC air purification systems (under development).
- Immobilized cell technology removes microfine particulate matter from the air by attracting charged particulates to a bio-reactive mass, or bioreactor, which enzymatically renders them inert.
- Ozone generators are designed to produce ozone and are sometimes sold as whole-house air cleaners. Unlike ionizers, ozone generators are intended to produce significant amounts of ozone, a strong oxidant gas which can oxidize many other chemicals. The only safe use of ozone generators is in unoccupied rooms, utilising "shock treatment" commercial ozone generators that produce over 3000 mg of ozone per hour. Restoration contractors use these types of ozone generators to remove smoke odors after fire damage, musty smells after flooding, mold (including toxic molds), and the stench caused by decaying flesh which cannot be removed by bleach or anything else except for ozone. However, it is not healthy to breathe ozone gas, and one should use extreme caution when buying a room air purifier that also produces ozone.
- Titanium dioxide (TiO_{2}) technology - nanoparticles of TiO_{2}, together with calcium carbonate to neutralize any acidic gasses that may be adsorbed, is mixed into slightly porous paint. Photocatalysis initiates the decomposition of airborne contaminants at the surface.
- Thermodynamic sterilization (TSS) - This technology uses heat sterilization via a ceramic core with microcapillaries, which are heated to 200 °C (392 °F). It is claimed that 99.9% of microbiological particles - bacteria, viruses, dust mite allergens, mold and fungus spores - are incinerated. The air passes through the ceramic core by the natural process of air convection, and is then cooled using heat transfer plates and released. TSS is not a filtering technology, as it does not trap or remove particles. TSS is claimed not to emit harmful by-products (although the byproducts of partial thermal decomposition are not addressed) and also reduces the concentration of ozone in the atmosphere.
- Reactive Oxygen Species (ROS) Technology also known as "ROS Purifier" - There are 7 airborne ROS. Some are short-lived and some are long-lived. The five short-lived ones are going to be hydroxyl radical, Singlet Oxygen (dioxidene), Superoxide, Atomic Oxygen, Peroxynitrite (peroxynitrite). The two long-lived ROS ones are Hydrogen Peroxide – Gas Phased, and Ozone. Due to the long-lived Hydrogen Peroxide (gas phased) and with low levels of Ozone (30ppb - 50 ppb) It is very effective in killing pathogens that include mold, bacteria, viruses, and germs in the air and on surfaces and provide odor control. Unlike Ozone generators that produce a high amount of ozone that is used as "shock treatment" is only effective in empty rooms without people present whereas ROS (Reactive Oxygen Species) purifiers can be effective safely 24/7 while people are present when ozone is (30ppb - 50 ppb). ROS (Reactive Oxygen Species) has very effective long-distance surface treatment due to its output of ozone (30ppb - 50ppb) and Hydrogen Peroxide it has, unlike Titanium dioxide that produces 2 ROS which are Hydroxyl radicals and superoxide that are a very short distance on surface treatment.

== Consumer concerns ==
Other aspects of some air cleaners are hazardous gaseous by-products from ozone-generating units, noise level, frequency of filter replacement, electrical consumption, and visual appeal. Ozone production is typical for air ionizing purifiers. A high concentration of ozone is dangerous, although most air ionizers produce low amounts, low rates of ozone reduce the effectiveness. A build up can cause detrimental health effects especially for vulnerable people. The noise level of a purifier can often be obtained through a customer service department and is usually reported in decibels (dB). The noise levels for most purifiers can vary and may be dependent on fan speed. Frequency of filter replacement and electrical consumption are the major operation costs for any purifier. There are many types of filters; some can be cleaned by water, by hand or by vacuum cleaner, while others need to be replaced every few months or years. Sometimes suitable filters are only sold by the manufacturer for a high cost, some have DRM control so only replacement filters authorised by the manufacturer can be used. In the United States, some purifiers are certified as Energy Star and are energy efficient.

HEPA technology is used in portable air purifiers as it removes common airborne allergens. The US Department of Energy has requirements manufacturers must pass to meet HEPA requirements. The HEPA specification requires removal of at least 99.97% of 0.3 micrometers airborne pollutants. Products that claim to be "HEPA-type", "HEPA-like", or "99% HEPA" do not satisfy these requirements and may not have been tested in independent laboratories.

Air purifiers may be rated on a variety of factors, including Clean Air Delivery Rate (which determines how well air has been purified); efficient area coverage; air changes per hour; energy usage; and the cost of the replacement filters. Two other important factors to consider are the length that the filters are expected to last (measured in months or years) and the noise produced (measured in decibels) by the various settings that the purifier runs on. This information is available from most manufacturers.

== Potential ozone hazards ==
As with other health-related appliances, there is controversy surrounding the claims of certain companies, especially involving ionic air purifiers. Many air purifiers generate some ozone, an energetic allotrope of three oxygen atoms, and in the presence of humidity, small amounts of NO_{x}. Because of the nature of the ionization process, ionic air purifiers tend to generate the most ozone. This is a serious concern because ozone is a criteria air pollutant regulated by health-related US federal and state standards. In a controlled experiment, in many cases, ozone concentrations were well in excess of public and/or industrial safety levels established by US Environmental Protection Agency, particularly in poorly ventilated rooms.

Ozone can damage the lungs, causing chest pain, coughing, shortness of breath and throat irritation. It can also worsen chronic respiratory diseases such as asthma and compromise the ability of the body to fight respiratory infections—even in healthy people. People who have asthma and allergy are most prone to the adverse effects of high levels of ozone. For example, increasing ozone concentrations to unsafe levels can increase the risk of asthma attacks.

Due to the below average performance and potential health risks, Consumer Reports has advised against using ozone producing air purifiers. Some manufacturers falsely claim outdoor and indoor ozone are different. Claims that these devices restore a hypothesized ionic balance are unsupported by science.

Ozone generators are used by cleanup contractors on unoccupied rooms to oxidize and permanently remove smoke, mold, and odor damage, and are considered a valuable and effective industrial tool. However, these machines can produce undesirable by-products.

In September 2007, the California Air Resources Board announced a ban of indoor air cleaning devices which produce ozone above a legal limit. This law, which took effect in 2010, requires testing and certification of all types of indoor air cleaning devices to verify that they do not emit excessive ozone.

== Industry and markets ==
As of 2015, the United States residential air purifier total addressable market was estimated at $2 billion per year.

== See also ==
- Air sanitizer
- Air-purifier with bladeless fan
- Particulates
- PECO (Photoelectrochemical oxidation)
- Nose filter
- NASA Clean Air Study
- Smog tower
- Scrubber
- Indoor air quality
- Corsi–Rosenthal Box
- CityTrees
- Direct air capture
