= Air Wick =

American brand of air freshener

- Product type: Air freshener
- Current owner: Advent International
- Country: United States
- Introduced: 1943; 83 years ago
- Markets: Global
- Previous owners: Airwick Industriespur
- Website: www.airwick.us

Air Wick is an American brand of air freshener owned by American investment Advent International. It was launched by creator Guy Paschal in 1943 in the United States, and is now sold worldwide.

== History ==
Air Wick was introduced in 1943 in the United States. In 1973, it had sales of $33.5 million and earnings of $2.7 million, prompting the Swiss pharmaceutical company Ciba-Geigy (now Novartis) to investigate purchasing it. Ciba-Geigy took brief control of the company in 1974 before selling it to British household products company Reckitt & Colman (now Reckitt Benckiser) in December 1984.

The sale was partly motivated by what Ciba-Geigy's top management saw as a product that was at odds with its corporate culture; its rationale was that, as a chemical business, it should not be involved with consumer products. In October 2007, Reckitt Benckiser won a High Court ruling in a lawsuit with Procter & Gamble over claims that the design of Air Wick Odour Stop was an exact copy of P&G's Febreze air spray.

In March 2012, Air Wick announced its partnership with the official charity of the United States' National Park Service, the National Park Foundation. The company launched four new scents inspired by Kaloko-Honokōhau National Historical Park, Virgin Islands National Park, Yellowstone National Park, and Glacier Bay National Park. Portions of the sales went to the National Park Foundation to aid National Parks.

Advent International finalized its acquisition of the Essential Home business, which includes Air Wick, from Reckitt on December 31, 2025.

== Products ==
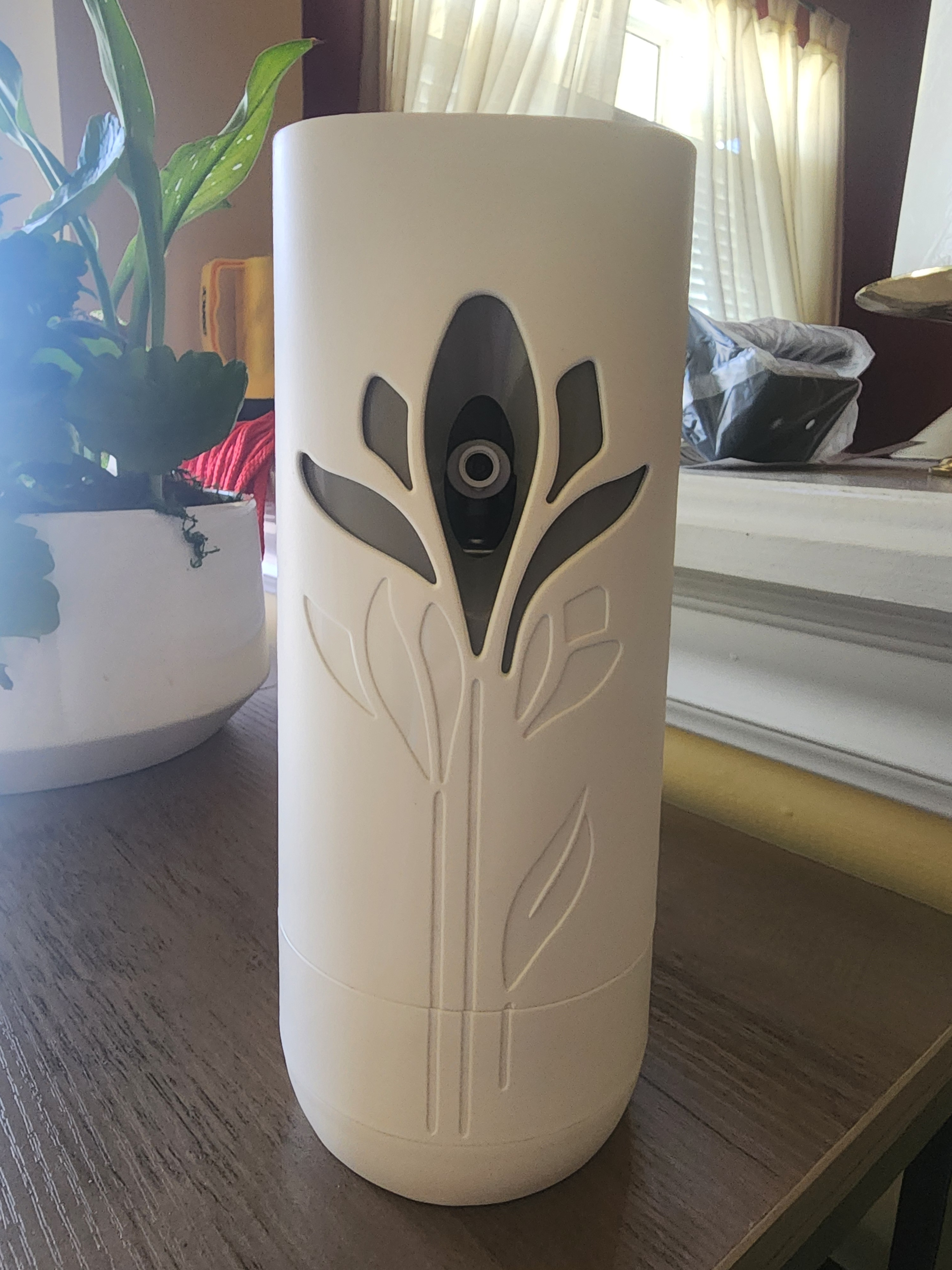
A 2020 redesigned Air Wick Freshmatic automatic air freshener dispenser

The current Air Wick range includes:

- Scented Oils
- Freshmatic
- Essential Mist Diffuser
- Automatic Sprays (Timed Air Freshener)
- Aerosol Spray
- V.I.P. Pre-Poop Toilet Spray

In the 1980s, it produced a type of air freshener called Magic Mushrooms. Ad:
