= Ambi Pur =

Air freshener brand owned by Procter & Gamble

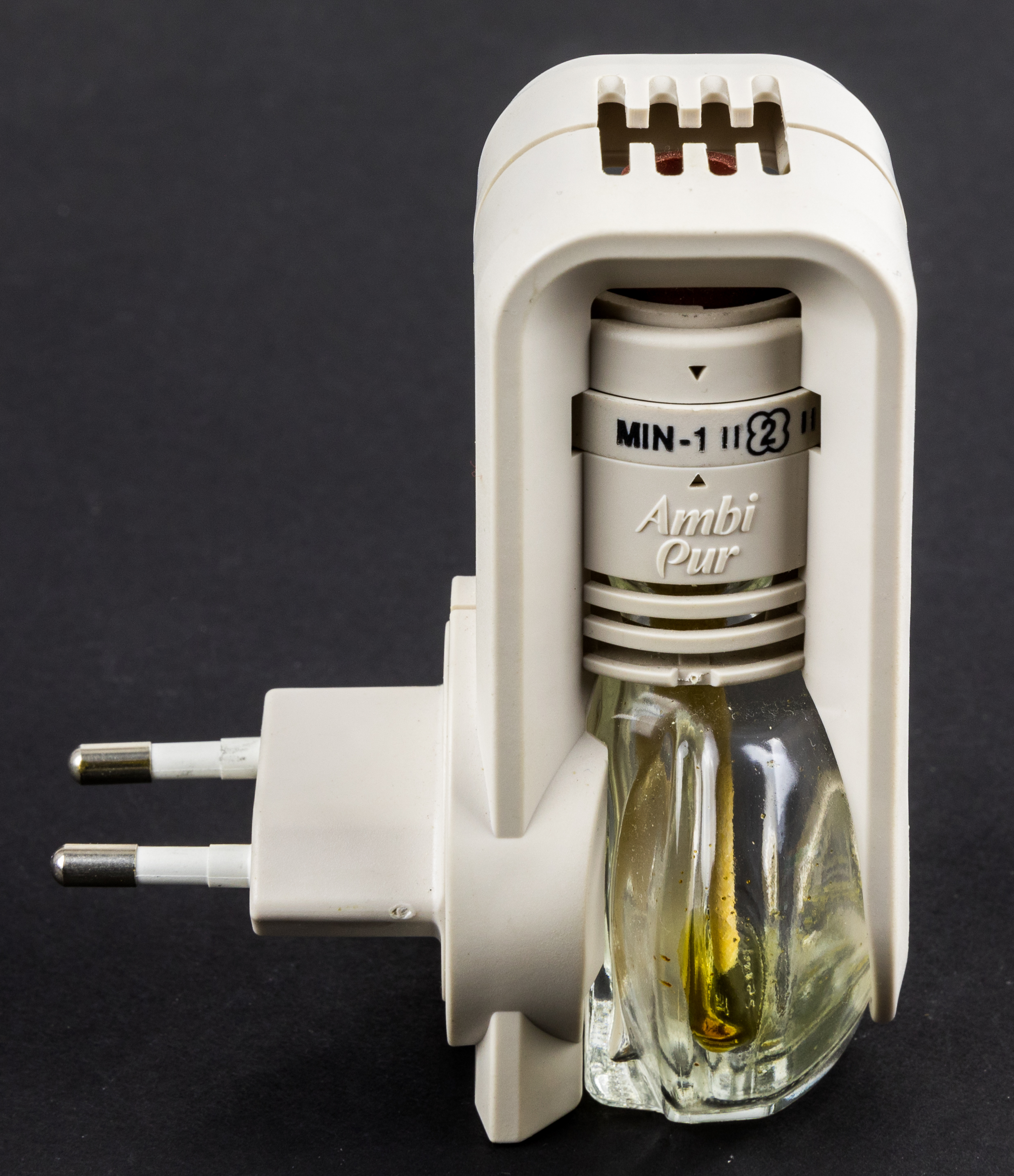
- Product type: Air freshener
- Current owner: Procter & Gamble
- Country: Spain
- Introduced: 1958; 68 years ago
- Markets: Worldwide
- Previous owners: Sara Lee Corporation

Ambi Pur is a Spanish brand of air freshener owned by Procter & Gamble. It was first introduced in 1958, in Spain, and is now sold worldwide.

== History ==
Ambi Pur's first product was launched in 1958 in Spain by Cruz Verde.

In 1984, Sara Lee Corporation acquired Cruz Verde. It was the first brand to launch a plug-in liquid air freshener.

On 11 December 2009, Procter & Gamble announced it would acquire Ambi Pur air care business from Sara Lee Corporation for €320 million.
