= Febreze =

Brand of household odor eliminators manufactured by Procter & Gamble

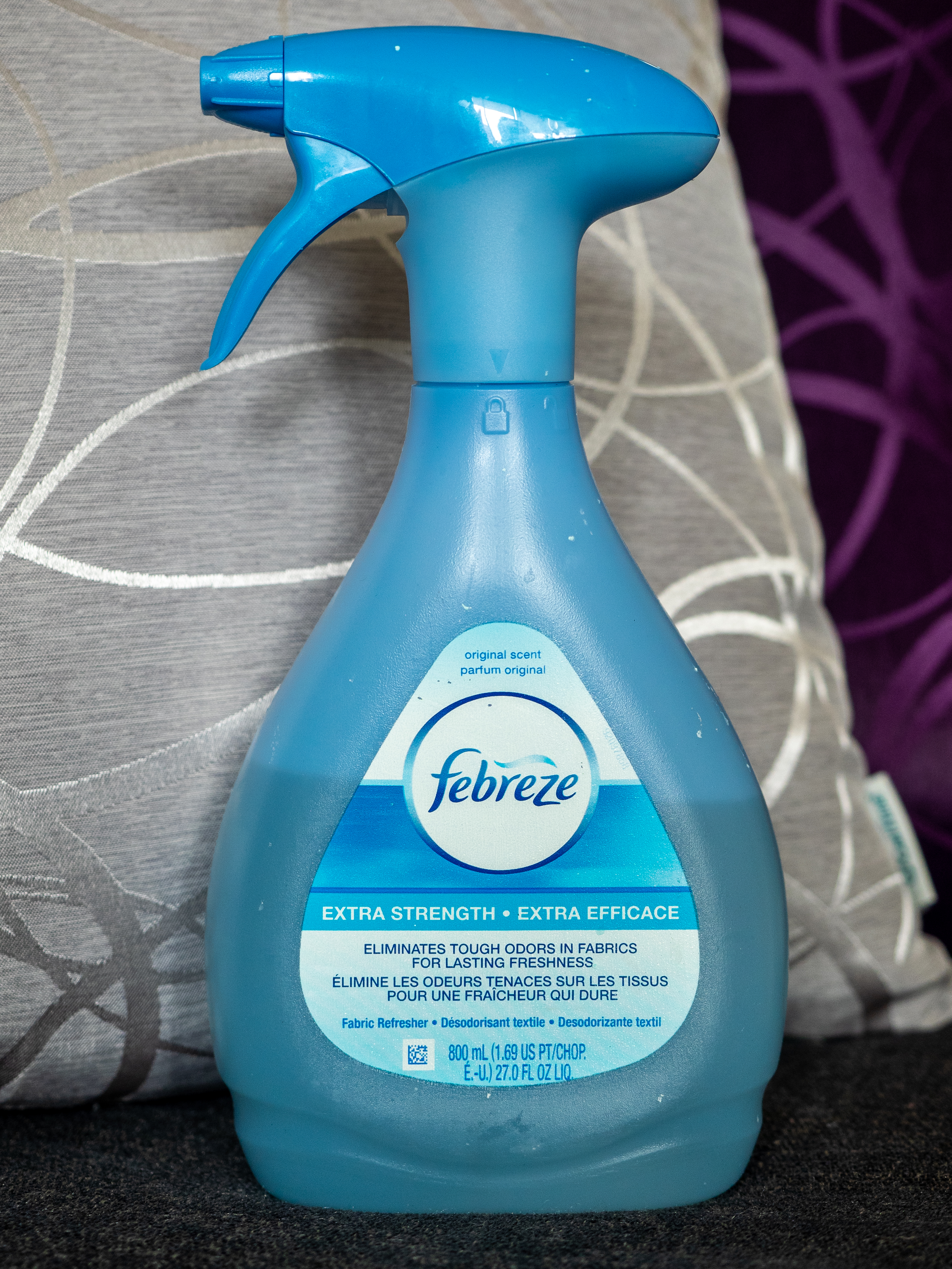
- Product type: Air freshener
- Current owner: Procter & Gamble
- Country: United States
- Introduced: March 1996; 30 years ago
- Markets: Worldwide
- Website: www.febreze.com

Febreze is an American brand of household odor eliminators manufactured by Procter & Gamble. It is sold in North America, South America, Europe, Africa, Asia, Australia, and New Zealand.

First introduced in test markets in March 1996, the fabric refresher product has been sold in the United States since 1998, and the line has since branched out to include air fresheners (Air Effects), plug-in oil (Noticeables), scented disks (Scentstories), odor-eliminating candles, and automotive air fresheners.

The name Febreze is a portmanteau of the words fabric and breeze. In many non-English speaking countries, the products are sold as Ambi Pur.

In 2010, the Febreze brand generated over one billion dollars in revenue worldwide.

== Ingredients ==
Beta-cyclodextrin (βCD), derived from corn

The active ingredient in several Febreze products is hydroxypropyl beta-cyclodextrin (HPβCD). The molecule traps and binds volatilized hydrocarbons within its structural ring, retaining malodorous molecules, which reduces their volatility and thus the perception of their scent. The active ingredient is produced from corn cobs. The use of cyclodextrin as a sprayable odor absorber was patented by Procter & Gamble.

The products include additional ingredients such as emulsifiers, preservatives, and perfumes. Benzisothiazolinone is a preservative included in some of the products.

== Lines ==
There are many types of Febreze branded products. For example, the main Febreze products are air freshener sprays, which are claimed to have a disinfectant effect. There are specialized ones for odor from pets, for cars, and for fabric. Some are aromatic and others are odorless.

- Air Effects
- Bedroom Mist
- Fabric Refresher
- Febreze ONE Fabric
- Bedding Refresher
- NOTICEables
- 3VOLUTION
- Bedroom Diffuser
- Bedside Diffuser
- Set&Refresh
- Stick&Refresh
- CAR Vent Clip
- Candles
- Wax melts
- Sleep Serenity

In other countries, there are Febreze products for house dust and toilet facilities.

== Marketing ==
The product was initially marketed as a way to get rid of unpleasant smells. It sold poorly until P&G realised that people become accustomed to smells in their own homes, and stop noticing them even when they are overpowering (like the smell of several cats in a single household). The marketing then switched to linking it to pleasant smells and good cleaning habits instead, which resulted in a massive increase in sales. Only after the product became well established in the marketplace did the marketing go back to emphasising odour elimination properties as well.

== Animal safety ==
Febreze fabric freshener products are considered safe for use in households with pets. However, the package labeling indicates that the product is considered not safe around birds, and results from testing with other animals are not indicated.

== See also ==
- Olfactory fatigue, referred to as "nose blind" in advertising campaign
