= Air freshener =

Product used to mask odors

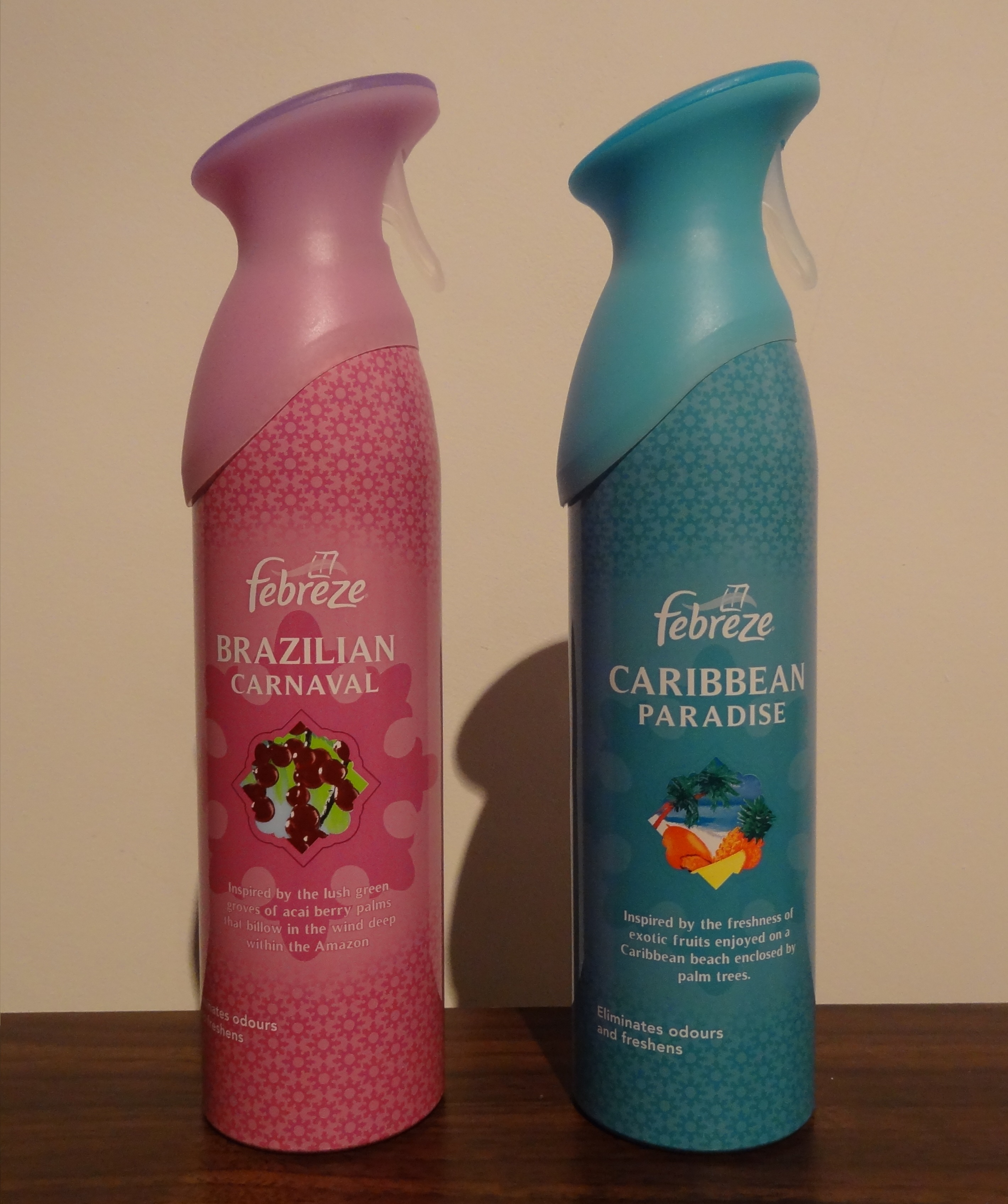
Air fresheners from Febreze

Air fresheners are products designed to reduce unwanted odors in indoor spaces, to introduce pleasant fragrances, or both. They typically emit fragrance to mask odors but may use other methods of action such as absorbing, bonding to, or chemically altering compounds in the air that produce smells, killing organisms that produce smells, or disrupting the sense of smell to reduce perception of unpleasant smells.

There are many different types of air fresheners that deliver their active ingredients in different ways, including sprays, candles, reed diffusers, scented beads, gels, passive and active evaporating diffusers, atomizers, automatically timed metered aerosol dispensers, electric fan air fresheners, and plug-ins. Air fresheners are used in domestic and commercial settings and in both small and large spaces. Some air fresheners are produced for specific spaces and odors, such as car fresheners and urinal deodorizer blocks. Some air fresheners contain ingredients that provoke allergy and asthma symptoms or are toxic. Air freshening also involves the use of organic and everyday household items.

== History ==
Fragrances have been used to mask odors since antiquity. A variety of methods and compounds have been used over the past two millennia for their abilities to create pleasant aromas or eliminate unpleasant odors in indoor spaces. These were often linked with spiritual or religious practices (e.g. the use of incense), or with concepts of health and hygiene. Consumer products for air freshening began to emerge in the late 1800s which coincided with the arrival of the first synthetically produced fragrances. However, air freshening consumer products first gained wider popularity in the 1940s.

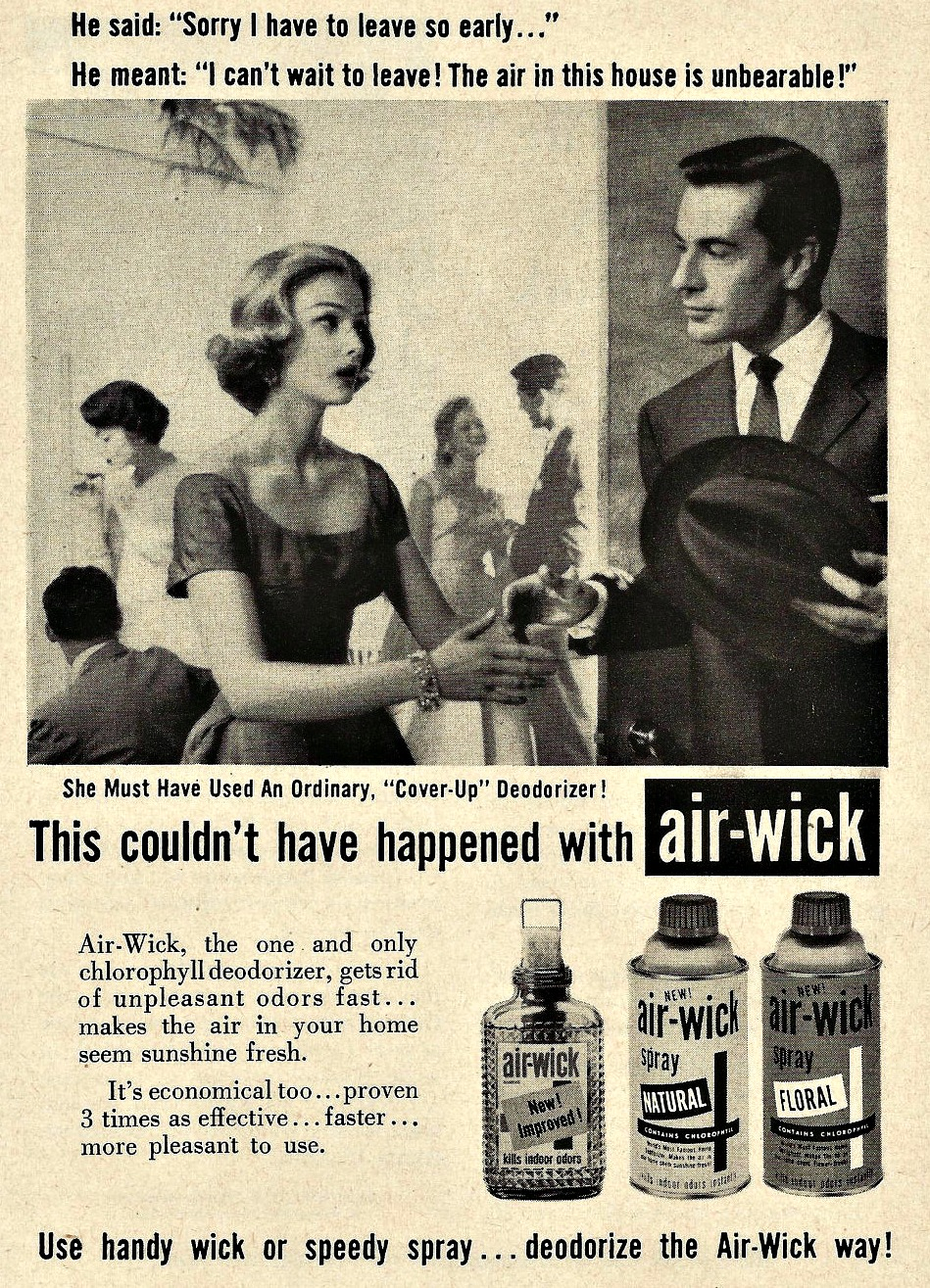
Air Wick print advertisement, 1957

In 1939, Air Wick launched in the United States, initially producing liquid air fresheners in a variety of fragrances, which worked by evaporation with the help of a wick. The products claimed to kill odors, not just mask them, by using chlorophyll. As early as 1953, scientists were questioning whether chlorophyll, at the time popular as a body deodorizer or for use on wounds, really acted as a space deodorizer. From 1947 to 1951, the company sold 7 million dollars' worth of these and other types of air fresheners.

The first fan-operated air freshener product was invented in 1946 and released by the company Surco under the brand Air-Scent in 1948.

In the United States, commercial aerosol sprays were introduced in 1948, based on what had been a military technology for dispensing insecticides. The product delivered a fine mist of aroma compounds that would remain suspended in the air for an extended period of time.

In the 1950s, many companies began to add chemicals that counteract odors to their fragrance formulas. These chemicals, intended to neutralize or destroy odors, included unsaturated esters, pre-polymers, and long-chain aldehydes.

In the 1980s, the air freshener market shifted back away from aerosols due to concerns over the destruction of the ozone layer by chlorofluorocarbons (CFCs) which were used as a propellant. Many other air freshener delivery methods have become popular since, including under the seat wafer air fresheners, scented candles, reed diffusers, potpourri, and heat release products.

== Basic principles ==
Air fresheners introduced fragrance into the air of interior spaces either as droplets which transition to vapor, or as the molecules of fragrance ingredients directly evaporating from a source. Fragrance diffuses into the air to mask other odors or to introduce a specific odor.

=== Mechanisms of odor control ===
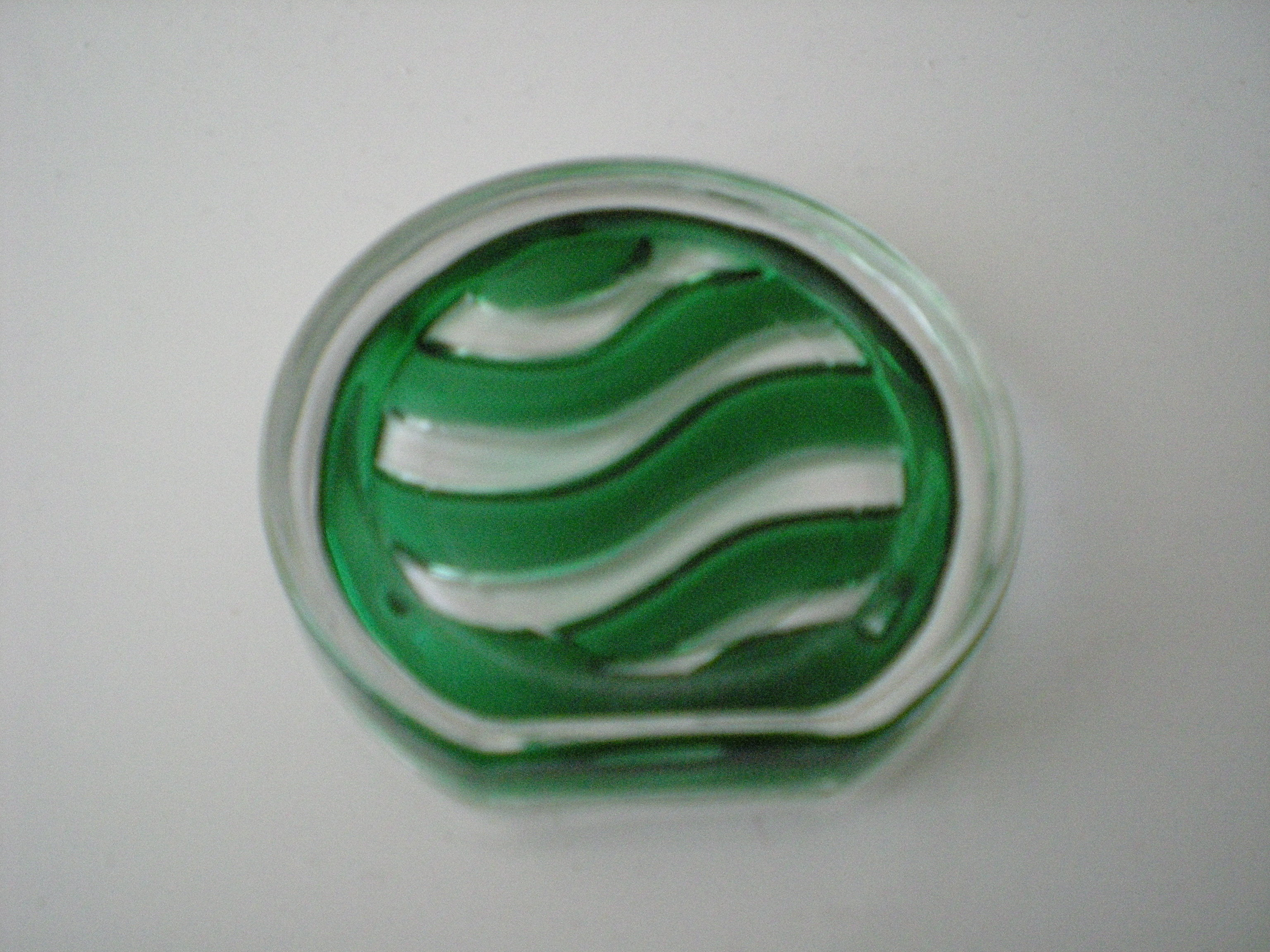
A basic gel fragrance air freshener

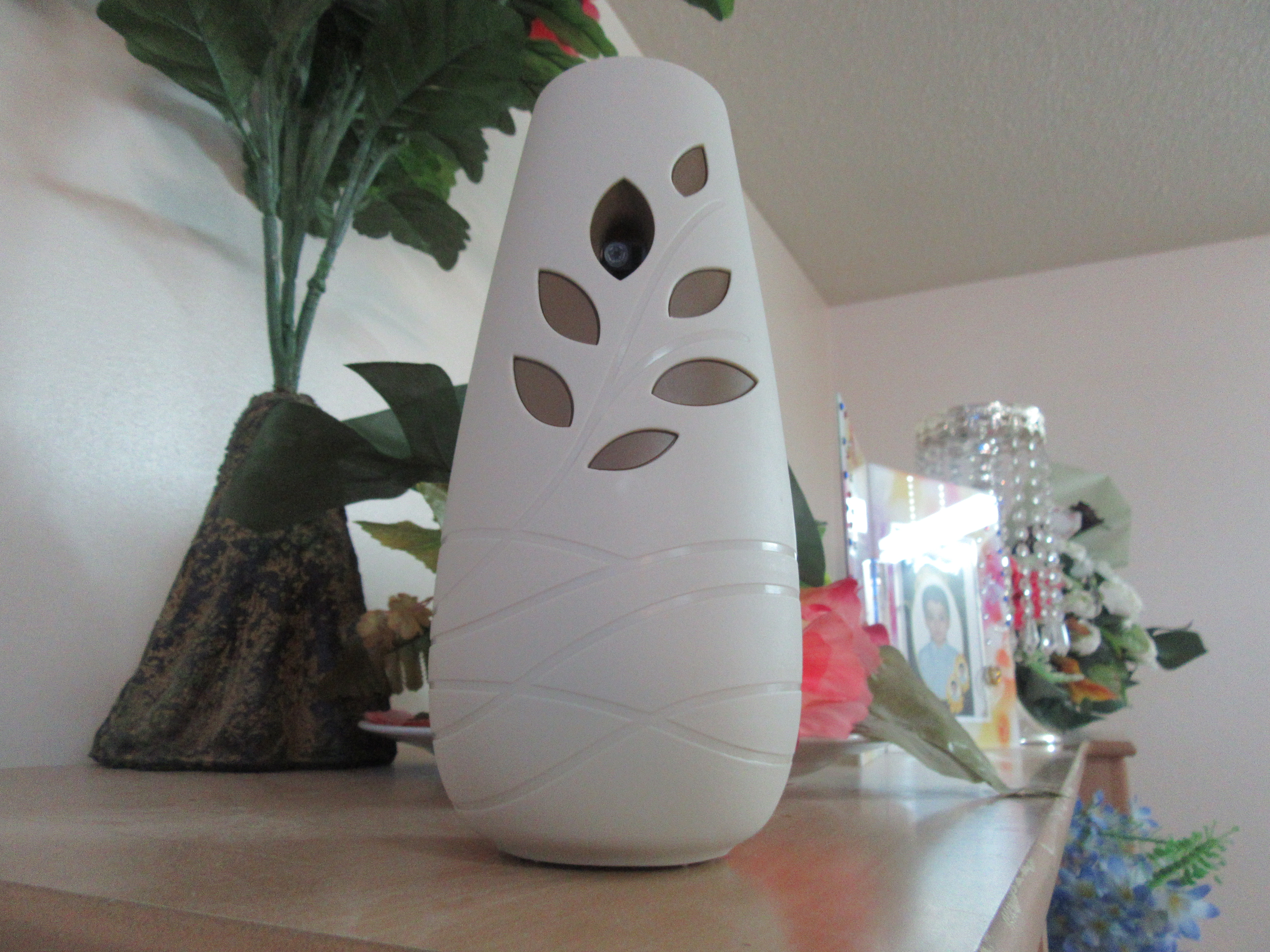
An automatic air freshener

Mechanisms for the control of indoor airborne odors can be grouped into various different classes:

- Masking: a pleasant odor may be used to overwhelm unwanted odors.
- Adsorption: adsorbents like zeolite, activated charcoal, or silica gel may be used to capture odor-producing compounds.
- Oxidation: ozone can oxidize and eliminate organic sources of odors from the air.
- Disinfection: odors caused by microorganisms can be removed by inactivating them using air sanitizers.

=== Delivery: continuous vs. instant action ===
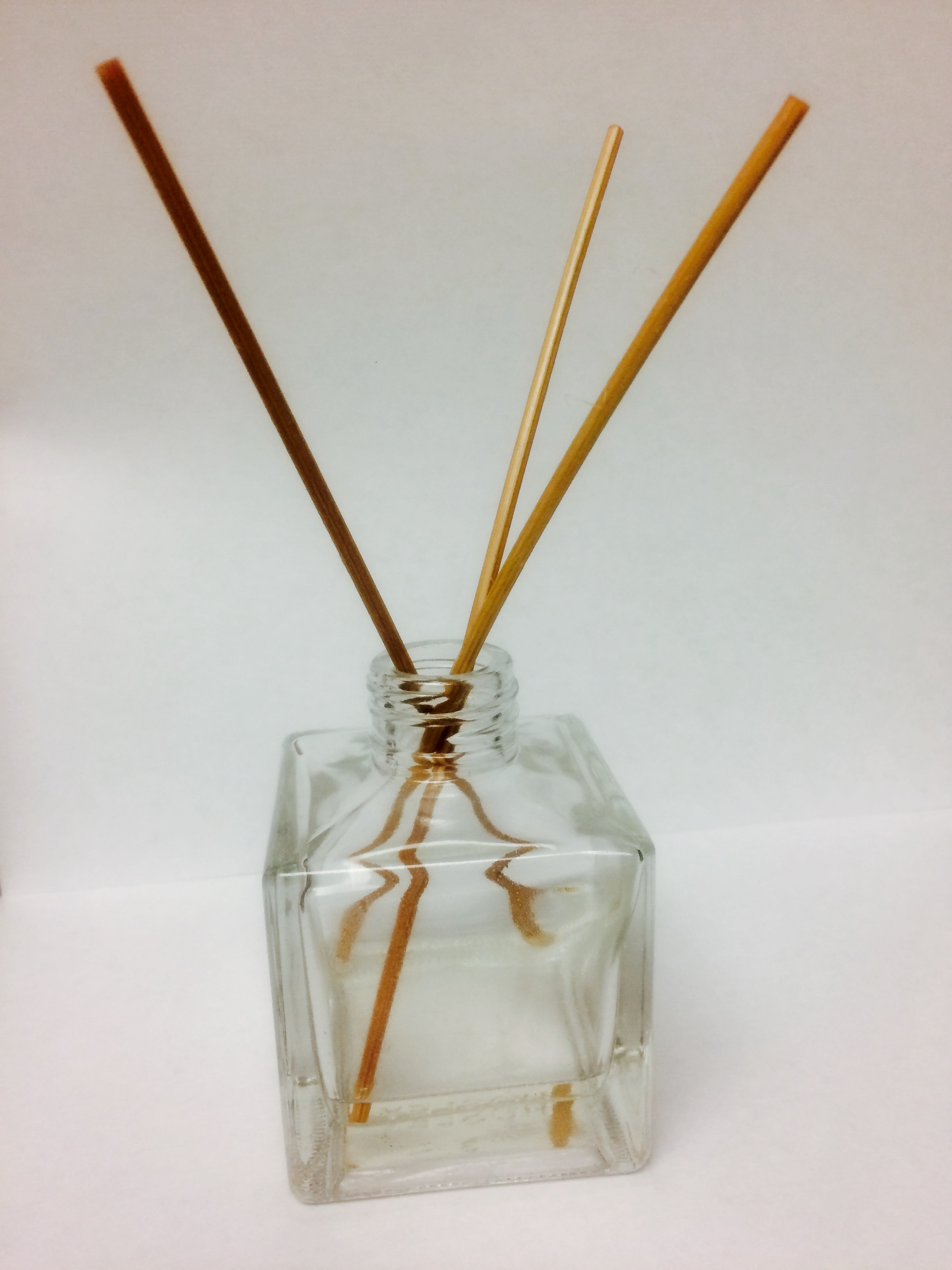
A reed diffuser

Delivery of the above air freshener mechanisms falls into two broad categories: continuous action and instant action.

Continuous action products include scented candles and devices which use a candle flame or some other heat source to heat and vaporize a fragrance formulation, incense burners, wall plug-ins which either use piezoelectric technology to aerosolize fragrance or heat to vaporize it, fragrance impregnated gels which release fragrance as the gel evaporates sometimes with the help of an electric fan, wick and reed diffusers which release fragrance by evaporation from fragrance-soaked wicks or wooden reeds; and fragrance impregnated materials like floor wax, paper, plastics, wood which release fragrance by off gassing; and lastly nebulization systems which convert liquid fragrances into a vapor in a cold process without the use of heat.

Instant action systems are mainly aerosol or atomizer sprays. The aerosol spray uses a propellant and fragrance packaged under pressure in a sealed metal container with a valve which is opened by pressing down a button which contains a spray nozzle – the actuator. When the container's valve is opened by pressing the actuator, fragrance is forced through the spray nozzle located inside the actuator to create a mist of droplets containing fragrance. These droplets are 30 to 50 micrometres in diameter. A recently developed alternative, the "bag-on-valve" aerosol, places the air freshener inside a bag in the can. The can is filled with pressurised air which squeezes the bag and pushes out the product when the actuator is pressed. An atomizer operates in a similar fashion except that the actuator is a pump which when pressed a few times creates the pressure to aspirate the fragrance from the container through a tube into the actuator and spray nozzle. Because the container is not constantly under pressure it may be made of glass or plastic as well as metal. The mist created contains droplets 50 to 150 micrometres in diameter.

== Ingredients ==
In addition to the fragrances, adsorbents, oxidizers, surfactants, and disinfectants listed above, air fresheners can also contain aerosol propellants, preservatives, and solvents.

=== Fragrances ===
Air fresheners use both synthesized and organically occurring fragrances. Common fragrances used include lyral and citronellal. Preparations often include terpenes such as limonene.

=== Aerosol propellants ===
A propellant is usually a liquid gas substance used to physically propel the product out of an aerosol spray. The substance chosen needs to be a gas that turns to liquid when pressurized with a relatively low amount of pressure, safe for domestic use. The propellant is a liquid when under pressure in the can, but maintains the pressure in the can (and thereby its spraying ability) by turning partially back to a gas to fill any empty space. Less common compressed gas propellants work similarly but maintain pressure by filling the empty space without liquefying. The propellant in a true aerosol is mixed with the air freshener, so it must also not react with the product. Sometimes, multiple propellants are combined.

CFCs were once popular propellants but are no longer widely used because of their damaging effects on the ozone layer and resulting bans. Current propellants used in air freshener sprays include:

- hydrocarbon aerosol propellant (HAP) blends: mixtures including propane, n-butane and isobutane
- dimethyl ether
- hydrofluorocarbon propellants (HFCs) such as 1,1-difluoroethane
- hydrofluoroolefin propellants (HFOs) such as 2,3,3,3-tetrafluoropropene HFOs have recently become more widely used due to their low vapor pressure, low global warming potential (GWP), and nonflammability.

Note that while bag-on-valve systems may use compressed air, nitrogen or carbon dioxide or other substances to squeeze the air freshener from the bag, these are not strictly ingredients because they are not mixed with the air freshener, and remain in the can.

=== Preservatives ===
Preservatives prevent the decomposition of the product or the growth of microorganisms in it. These can include:

- parabens such as methylparaben and propylparaben
- isothiazolinones such as methylisothiazoline and benzisothiazolinone
- formaldehyde releasers such as DMDM hydantoin

=== Solvents, emulsifiers and surfactants ===
These are substances that help other ingredients mix together, either by dissolving or emulsifying.

Solvents used in air fresheners include ethanol, mineral oil, or glycol ethers such as 2-butoxyethanol and trideceth-4.

== Toxicity and hazards ==
There have been various concerns about air fresheners having adverse health effects, due to factors including harmful ingredients, secondary substances formed by the chemical interactions of ingredients with other substances, allergy-provoking ingredients, misuse, and accidental injury.

=== Harmful ingredients and secondary substances ===
Many air fresheners employ carcinogens, volatile organic compounds and known toxins such as phthalate esters in their formulas. A Natural Resources Defense Council (NRDC) study of 13 common household air fresheners found that most of the surveyed products contain chemicals that can aggravate asthma and affect reproductive development. The NRDC called for more rigorous supervision of the manufacturers and their products, which are widely assumed to be safe:

The study assessed scented sprays, gels, and plug-in air fresheners. Independent lab testing confirmed the presence of phthalates, or hormone-disrupting chemicals that may pose a particular health risk to babies and young children, in 12 of the 14 products—including those marked 'all natural.' None of the products had these chemicals listed on their labels.

On September 19, 2007, along with the Sierra Club, Alliance for Healthy Homes, and the National Center for Healthy Housing, the NRDC filed a petition with the U.S. Environmental Protection Agency and the Consumer Product Safety Commission to report the findings.

Research at the University of Colorado at Boulder revealed the carcinogenic nature of paradichlorobenzene (PCDB) and naphthalene, present in some types of air fresheners. The pesticide substances were mainly used in mothballs but also in room sprays and toilet rim blocks.

The University of Bristol's Avon Longitudinal Study of Parents and Children (ALSPAC) found that exposure to volatile organic compounds through frequent use of air fresheners and other aerosols in the home was found to correlate with increased earaches and diarrhea in infants, and with increased depression and headaches in their mothers.

In 2008, Anne C. Steinemann of the University of Washington published a study of top-selling air fresheners and laundry products. She found that all products tested gave off chemicals regulated as toxic or hazardous under federal laws, including carcinogens with no safe exposure level, but none of these chemicals were listed on any of the product labels or material safety data sheets. Chemicals included acetone, the active ingredient in paint thinner and nail-polish remover; chloromethane, a neurotoxicant and respiratory toxicant; and acetaldehyde and 1,4-dioxane, both carcinogens. A plug-in air freshener contained more than 20 different volatile organic compounds, with more than one-third classified as toxic or hazardous under federal laws. Even air fresheners called "organic," "green," or with "essential oils" emitted hazardous chemicals, including carcinogens.

A report issued in 2005 by the Bureau Européen des Unions de Consommateurs (BEUC) found that many air freshener products emit allergens and toxic air pollutants including benzene, formaldehyde, terpenes, styrene, phthalate esters, and toluene.

In the United States, since 2020 air fresheners (as well as cleaning solutions and products used to clean cars) have been required to list any of their ingredients which are on California's list of 2,300 harmful chemicals, based on a California law passed in 2017. A California study in 2006 found that the prominent products of the reaction of terpenes found in air fresheners with ozone included formaldehyde, hydroxyl radical, and secondary ultrafine particles. It is not clear if manufacturers will need to list such chemicals which are not ingredients, but form during deployment and are thus able to affect human health.

=== Allergens and irritants ===
In 2009, Stanley M. Caress of the University of West Georgia and Anne C. Steinemann of the University of Washington published results from two national epidemiological studies of health effects from exposure to air fresheners. They found that nearly 20 percent of the general population and 34 percent of asthmatics report headaches, breathing difficulties, or other health problems when exposed to air fresheners or deodorizers.

=== Misuse and accidental injury ===
Air freshener aerosols with certain propellants are susceptible to misuse as an inhalant. Air fresheners have also been used to cause aerosol burn. In rare cases aerosol burns are reported to have been caused by air freshener canisters exploding.

== Alternatives to fragranced air fresheners ==
Removing the source of an unpleasant odor will decrease the chance that people will smell it. Ventilation is also important to maintaining indoor air quality and can aid in eliminating unpleasant odors. Simple cleaners such as white vinegar and baking soda, as well as natural adsorbents like activated charcoal and zeolite, are effective at removing odors. Other solutions are adapted to different types of odor. Some house plants may also aid in the removal of toxic substances from the air in building interiors.

== See also ==
- Deodorant
- Incense
- Air purifier
- Air ionizer
- Automatic deodorizer dispenser
- Deodorizing toilet seat
