= Automatic deodorizer dispenser =

Automatic perfume or air freshener dispenser

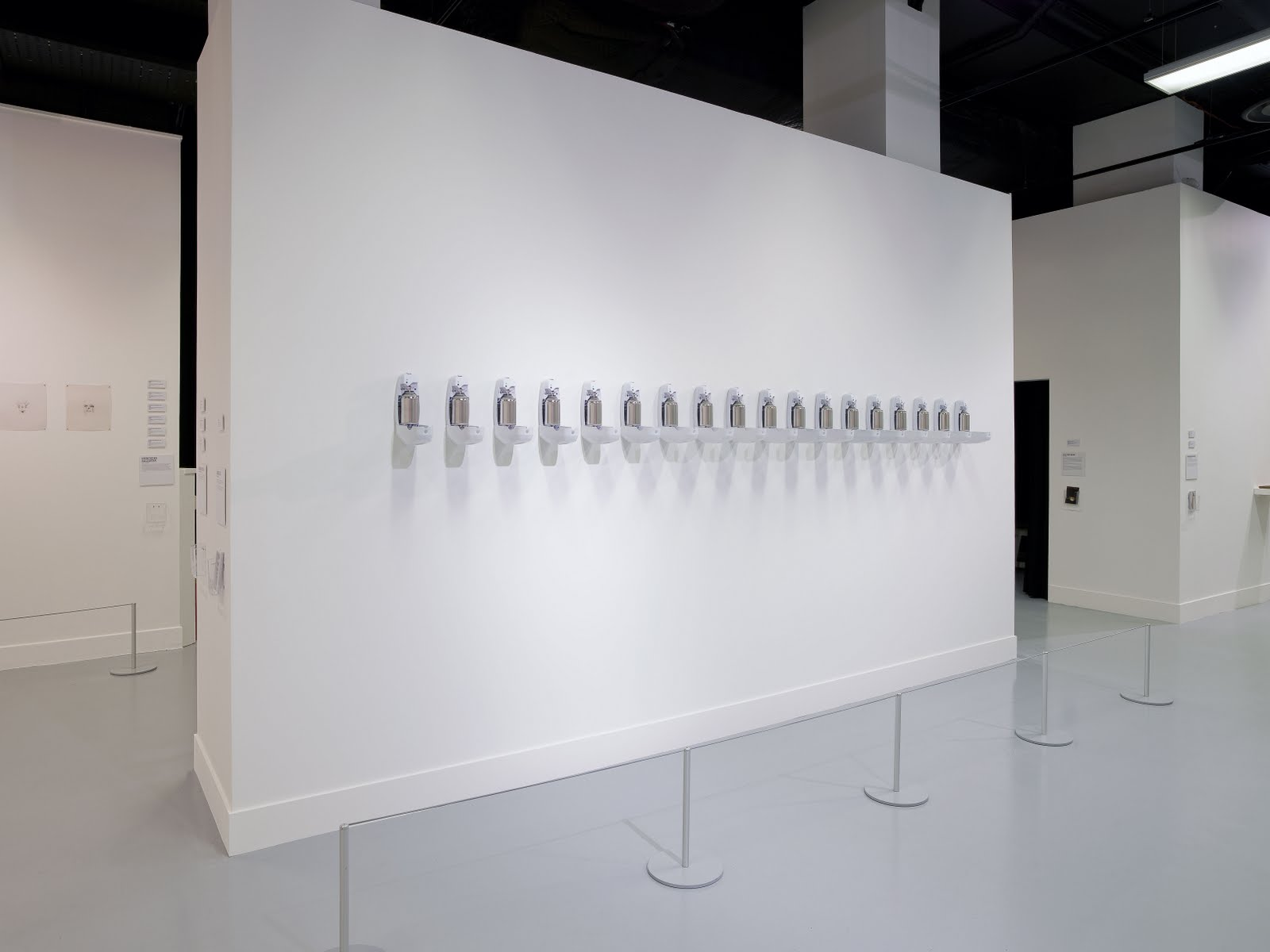
Display of 18 automatic air freshener machines at Selfridges, London

An automatic deodorizer dispenser is an air freshener designed to release the encapsulated scent at a set time, or under preset conditions. Some fresheners operate by releasing a quick burst of scent every nine minutes, 18 minutes, or 36 minutes so the user does not become too accustomed to the smell. Other kinds operate by having a light sensor or motion sensor attached, and releasing a burst of fragrance whenever this sensor is tripped.

Each bus of TransJakarta is equipped with automatic air freshener dispensers which periodically spray car fragrance in order to keep the air fresh.

== Modification ==
Automatic deodorizer dispensers have been the target of hacking by hobbyists due to their relatively low cost.

== See also ==
- Deodorant
- Incense
- Little Trees
- Urinal deodorizer block
- Lyral, citronellal
