= Goldberg drum =

Laboratory equipment used in studying aerosols

A Goldberg drum is a laboratory equipment used in the studies of aerosols. It was described by Leonard J. Goldberg from the Naval Biological Laboratory, School of Public Health, University of California, Berkeley, in 1958. It is used to contain airborne aerosols and particles.
