= Indoor bioaerosol =

Indoor bioaerosol is bioaerosol in an indoor environment. Bioaerosols are natural or artificial particles of biological (microbial, plant, or animal) origin suspended in the air. These particles are also referred to as organic dust. Bioaerosols may consist of bacteria, fungi (and spores and cell fragments of fungi), viruses, microbial toxins, pollen, plant fibers, etc. Size of bioaerosol particles varies from below 1 μm to 100 μm in aerodynamic diameter; viable bioaerosol particles can be suspended in air as single cells or aggregates of microorganism as small as 1–10 μm in size. Since bioaerosols are potentially related to various human health effects and the indoor environment provides a unique exposure situation, concerns about indoor bioaerosols have increased over the last decade.

== Sources and influencing factors ==
=== Sources for indoor environments ===
Indoor bioaerosols may originate from outdoor air and indoor reservoirs. Although outdoor bioaerosols cannot easily migrate into large buildings with complex ventilation systems, certain categories of outdoor bioaerosols (i.e., fungal spores) do serve as major sources for indoor bioaerosols in naturally ventilated buildings at specific periods of time (i.e., growing seasons for fungi). Major indoor sources for bioaerosols at residential homes include human occupants, pets, house dust, organic waste, as well as the heating, ventilation and air-conditioning (HVAC) system. Several studies have identified human activities as an important source for indoor bioaerosols. Human bodies can generate bioaerosols directly through activities like talking, sneezing, and coughing, while other residential activities (i.e., washing, flushing toilet, sweeping floor) can generate bioaerosols indirectly. Since microorganisms can accumulate and grow on dust particles, house dust is a potential source of bioaerosols. In a study by Wouters et al., they investigated the effects of indoor storage of organic household waste on microbial contamination among 99 households in the Netherlands in the summer of 1997, and indicated that "increased microbial contaminant levels in homes are associated with indoor storage of separated organic waste", which might elevate "the risk of bioaerosol-related respiratory symptoms in susceptible people". However, the analysis by Wouters et al. was based on the collected samples of settled house dust, which might not serve as a strong indicator for bioaerosols suspended in the air. Other materials in residential buildings, such as food stuffs, house plants, textiles, wood material and furniture stuffing can also become bioaerosol sources when water content is appropriate for microorganisms to grow. For non-residential buildings, some specific indoor environments, such as hospitals, wastewater treatment plants, composting facilities, certain biotechnical laboratories, have been revealed to have bioaerosol sources related to their particular environmental characteristics.

=== Factors influencing indoor bioaerosol generation ===
According to previous studies, major indoor environmental factors influencing bioaerosol concentration include relative humidity, characteristics of air ventilation systems, seasonal variation, temperature, and chemical composition of the air. Other factors, such as the type of home, building material, geographical factors, do not seem to have significant impacts on respirable fungi and bacteria (important constituents of bioaerosols). Relative humidity is one of the most widely studied influencing factors for indoor bioaerosols. Concentrations of two categories of bioaerosols, endotoxin and airborne fungi, are both positively related to indoor relative humidity (higher concentration associated with higher relative humidity). Relative humidity also affects the infectivity of airborne viruses. Regarding the characterisation of air ventilation system, increased use of central air conditioning is found to be associated with lower fungal bioaerosol concentration.

== Human health effects ==
Adverse health effects/diseases related to indoor bioaerosol exposure can be divided into two categories: those confirmed to be associated with bioaerosol and those suspected but not confirmed to be associated with bioaerosol. Bioaerosols have been revealed to cause certain human diseases, such as tuberculosis, Legionnaires' disease and different forms of bacterial pneumonia, coccidioidomycosis, influenza, measles, and gastrointestinal illness. Bioaerosols are also associated with some noninfectious airway diseases, such as allergies and asthma. As a known component of indoor bioaerosol, β(1→3)-glucan (cell wall components of most fungi) is proposed to be the causative agent of mold-induced nonallergic inflammatory reactions. It is reported that 25%-30% of allergenic asthma cases in industrialised countries are induced by fungi, which has been the focus of concerns about human exposure to airborne microorganisms in recent years.

Some other human diseases and symptoms have been proposed to be associated with indoor bioaerosol, but no deterministic conclusions could be drawn due to the insufficiency of evidence. One example is the well-known sick building syndrome (SBS). SBS refers to non-specific complaints, such as upper-respiratory irritative symptoms, headaches, fatigue, and rash, which cannot be related to an identifiable cause but are building related. Over the last two decades, there have been many studies indicating association of indoor bioaerosol with sick building syndrome. However, most of the related studies based their conclusions on statistical correlation between concentrations of certain types of bioaerosols and incidence of complaints, which has various drawbacks methodologically. For example, some studies have a small sample size, which critically undermines the validity of speculations based on the statistical results. Also, many studies were not able to exclude the influences of other factors beside bioaerosol in their analysis, which makes the statistical correlation theoretically inappropriate to support association of SBS with bioaerosols. Additional studies revealed that bioaerosol is unlikely to be the cause of SBS. Recent epidemiological and toxicological studies continued to suggest a possible link between bioaerosol exposure and sick building syndrome, but methodological limitations remained in these studies.

The ability of bioaerosols to cause human disease depend not only on their chemical composition and biological characteristics, but also on the quantity of bioaerosol inhaled and their size distribution, which determines the site of bioaerosol deposition to human respiratory systems. Bioaerosols larger than 10 μm in aerodynamic diameter are generally blocked by the nasal region of the respiratory tract, those between 5-10 μm mainly deposit in the upper respiratory system and usually induce symptoms like allergic rhinitis, and particles with aerodynamic diameter less than 5 μm can reach the alveoli and hence lead to serious illnesses such as allergic alveolitis.

Because of the confirmed and potential adverse health effects associated with indoor bioaerosol, some concentration limits for total number of bioaerosol particles are recommended by different agencies and organisations as follow: 1000 CFUs/m^{3} (National Institute for Occupational Safety and Health (NIOSH)), 1000 CFUs/m^{3} (American Conference of Governmental Industrial Hygienists (ACGIH)) with the culturable count for total bacteria not exceeding 500 CFUs/m^{3}. Note that for most types of indoor bioaerosols, the establishment of specific concentration limits or acceptance levels presents multiple challenges (e.g., differences on sampling and analysis method, irrelevance of sampling units to human exposure measurement; multiplicity and variability of composition, etc.).

== Sampling and detection methods ==
=== Bioaerosol sampling techniques ===
To enable subsequent identification and quantification, bioaerosols need to be captured from the air first. Different air sampling techniques have been used to realise the goal of capturing indoor bioaerosols.. Important characteristics of bioaerosol sampling include: representativeness of sampling, sampler performance, and compatibility with subsequent analysis. Long-term sampler theoretically has a better representativeness of sampling than short-term sampler, but may not have a good temporary resolution. Performance of samplers (i.e., limit of detection and upper limit of range) has a significant impact on the reliability of results. Different characterisations of samplers can also limit the possibilities for further analysis (identification and quantification). Major bioaerosol sampler types and their possible subsequent analysis are summarised in Table 1. A frequently used sampler in previous studies is the Andersen impactor.

Table 1 Major types of bioaerosol samplers (adapted from).
Sampler	Example of Device	Possible Subsequent Analysis
Impactors and Sieve Samplers	Andersen impactor; SAS; Burkard sampler	Cultivation; Microscopic analysis
Impingers	AGI-30; Shipe sampler; Midget, multi-stage and micro-impingers	Cultivation; Microscopic analysis; Biochemical analysis; Immunoassays
Centrifugal Samplers	RCS; Aerojet cyclone	Cultivation; Microscopic analysis; Biochemical analysis; Immunoassays
Filter Cassette	Glass fiber; Teflon filters; Polycarbonate	Cultivation; Microscopic analysis; Biochemical analysis; Immunoassays

Certain limitations exist for commonly used bioaerosol samplers. For most of the samplers, nonbiological environmental particles such as dust must be separated from bioaerosols prior to detection. The diluted nature of bioaerosol in the air also poses challenges to samplers. While total microorganism concentrations are on the order of 10^{6}/cm^{3} or greater, bioaerosol concentrations are commonly less than 1/cm^{3}, and often less than 1/m^{3} in the case of infectious aerosols. Moreover, many commercially available bioaerosol samplers haven not been investigated on their collection efficiencies for particles with different aerodynamic diameters, which makes it impossible to get the size-resolved bioaerosol information.

=== Identification and quantification methods ===
In previous research on indoor bioaerosol in residential environments, microorganisms have been quantified by conventional culture-based techniques, in which colony forming units (CFU) on selective media are counted. Cultivating methods have several disadvantages. Culture-based methods are known to underestimate environmental microbial diversity, based on the fact that only a small percentage of microbes can be cultivated in the laboratory. This underestimation is likely to be signified for the quantification of bioaerosol, since colony counts of airborne microbes are typically quite different from direct counts. Culture-based methods also need relatively long incubation times (over 24 hours) and are labor-intensive. Consequently, culture-based methods are no longer suitable for effective and rapid identification and quantification of bioaerosol, and non-culture based methods, such as immunoassays, molecular biological tests, and optical, and electrical methods, have been developing over the past few decades.

Major culture-independent identification/quantification methods adopted in previous bioaerosol studies include polymerase chain reaction (PCR), quantitative polymerase chain reaction (qPCR), microarray (PhyloChip), fluorescent in situ hybridisation (FISH), flow cytometry and solid-phase cytometry, immunoassay (i.e., enzyme-linked immunosorbent assay (ELISA)). The well-known PCR is a powerful tool in identifying and even quantifying the biological origin of bioaerosols. PCR alone cannot accomplish all the tasks related to bioaerosol detection; instead it usually serves as the preparation tool for subsequent processes like DNA sequencing, microarray, and community fingerprinting techniques. A typical procedure for PCR-based bioaerosol analysis is shown in Figure 1.

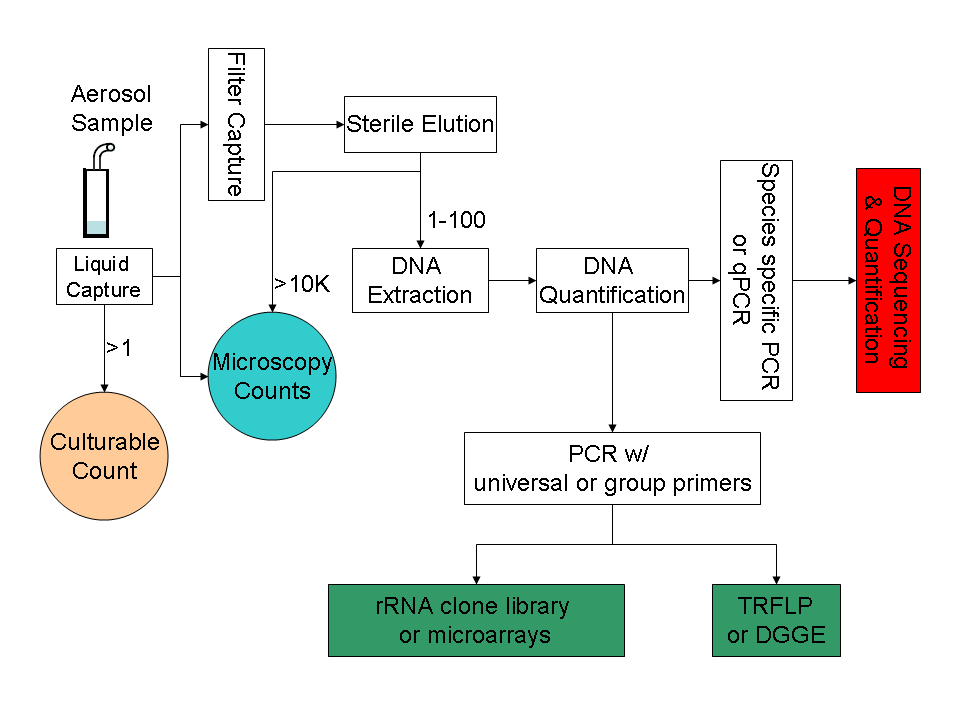
Figure 1 Pathways to PCR-based bioaerosol analysis (adapted from).The numbers listed indicate the quantities of bioaerosols required for successful analysis.

Molecular biological methods for bioaerosol are significantly faster and more sensitive than conventional culture-based methods, and they are also able to reveal a larger diversity of microbes. Targeting the variation in the 16S rRNA gene, a microarray (PhyloChip) was used to conduct comprehensive identification of both bacterial and archaeal organisms in bioaerosols. New U.S. EPA methods have been developed to utilise qPCR to characterise indoor environment for fungal spores. In a study by Lange et al., FISH method successfully identified eubacteria in samples of complex native bioaerosols in swine barns. Nonetheless, molecular biological tools have limitations. Since PCR methods target DNA, viability of cells could not be confirmed in some cases. When qPCR technique is used for bioaerosol detection, standard curves need to be developed to calibrate final results. One study indicated that "curves used for quantification by qPCR needs to be prepared using the same environmental matrix and procedures as handling of the environmental sample in question" and that "reliance on the standard curves generated with cultured bacterial suspension (a traditional approach) may lead to substantial underestimation of microorganism quantities in environmental samples". Microarray techniques also face the challenge of natural sequence diversity and potential cross-hybridisation in complex environmental bioaerosols).

== Concentration levels in different geographical regions ==
Concentration levels of indoor bioaerosols in different regions of the world recorded in published literatures are summarised as Table 2.

Table 2 Concentration of indoor bioaerosols in different regions of the world
Geographical Region	Study Period	Sampling/Survey Size	Average Concentration Level (CFU/m^{3})	Major Microbes Present	References
Midwestern area, USA	April–September, 1991	27 (noncomplaint homes)	Viable bacteria: 970; Culturable fungi: 1200.	N/A	
Taipei area, Taiwan	July 1996	40 daycare centers (DC), 69 office buildings (OB), 22 homes (H)	Bacteria: 7651(DC), 1502(OB), 2907(H); Fungi: 854(DC), 195(OB), 695(H).	N/A	
25 states of USA	1994-1998	100 large office buildings	Total bacteria (average): 101.9; Total bacteria (90th percentile): 175.	Mesophilic bacteria	
Upper Silesia, Poland	1996-1998	70 dwellings	Bacterial aerosol in homes: 1000; Bacterial aerosol in offices: 100.	Micrococcus spp; Staphylococcus epidermidis	
The city of Boston, USA	May 1997-May 1998	21 offices	Fungi: 42.05 (Standard deviation=69.60)	N/A	
Hong Kong, China	About 1 week	2 offices	Highest bacterial concentration: 2912; Highest fungal concentration: 3852.	Cladosporium; Penicillium	
The city of Daegu, Republic of Korea	June 2003-August 2004	41 bars, 41 internet cafes, 44 classrooms, 20 homes	Total bacteria and total fungi: 10–1000.	N/A	

== Approaches to control indoor bioaerosols ==
Based on the sources and the influencing factors for indoor bioaerosols, corresponding remedial actions can be taken to control related contamination. Potentially effective strategies include: 1) limiting entrance of outdoor aerosols; 2) keeping the relative humidity level below high levels (<60%); 3) installing appropriate filtration devices to air ventilation system to inlet filtered outdoor air into indoor environment; 4) reducing/removing contaminant sources (i.e., indoor organic waste). As in the U.S., due to the increase in tuberculosis in the mid-1980s, indoor air treatment has developed substantially during the past two decades. Current or developing indoor air purification technologies include filtration, aerosol ultraviolet irradiation, electrostatic precipitation, unipolar ion emission, and photocatalytic oxidation.

== See also ==
- Bioaerosol
- Indoor air quality
- Sick building syndrome
