= IQAir =

Swiss air quality technology company

- Type: Private
- Industry: Environmental technology
- Founded: 1963; 63 years ago Germany
- Founders: Manfred Hammes; Klaus Hammes
- Headquarters: Steinach, Switzerland
- Area served: Worldwide
- Key people: Frank Hammes; Jens Hammes; Glory Dolphin-Hammes
- Products: Air purifiers Air quality instruments
- Number of employees: ca. 500 (February 2020)
- Website: iqair.com

IQAir is a Swiss air quality technology company, specializing in protection against airborne pollutants, developing air quality monitoring and air cleaning products. IQAir also operates AirVisual, a real-time air quality information platform. As of February 2020, it had around 500 employees worldwide, 150 of them in China, and its most important markets were Asia and North America.

== History ==
IQAir was founded in 1963 by brothers Manfred and Klaus Hammes, who introduced an air filter system for residential coal ovens in Germany to help reduce black dust build-up on the walls behind ovens. Manfred Hammes, a lifelong asthma sufferer, noticed that the filter reduced his flare-ups during the winter months.

Klaus Hammes continued through the 1960s and '70s, to adapt the air filter for other heating systems such as radiators, baseboard heating and forced-air heating and cooling systems. In 1982, Klaus Hammes relocated the company headquarters to Switzerland.

In the early 1990s, Frank Hammes, Klaus' oldest son, joined the company and expanded research and development as well as in-house manufacturing. In the spring of 1998, IQAir shipped its first high-performance air purifier from its Swiss factory. In 2001, Klaus Hammes' second son, Jens Hammes, joined the business and helped expand IQAir to Asia and the Middle East.

== Products ==
IQAir currently has products in four product categories, namely air purifiers, HVAC-based air cleaning, air quality instruments and the global air quality information platform AirVisual.

== Technology ==
IQAir employs a wide range of particulate and gas-phase removal technologies in its air purifiers and air filters. The company has been a vocal opponent of ionizing and ozone-producing air cleaning technologies. IQAir's air quality information platform uses artificial intelligence (AI) to calibrate and validate thousands of governmental and non-governmental air quality monitoring stations.

== Company organization ==
IQAir is headquartered in Switzerland with major operations in Germany, the U.S., and China. Product development is based in Switzerland. As of 2020, manufacturing is based in countries including Switzerland and Southern Germany.

As of 2015, IQAir was family-owned and did not publish concrete information about its revenue or profits.

== See also ==
- Air purifier
- HEPA
- Indoor air quality
