= Immobilized Cell Technology =

Immobilized cell technology is a method of air filtration and purification that uses whole cell immobilization. It is a process whereby microfine particulate matter is removed from the air by attracting charged particulates in the air to a bio-reactive mass, or bioreactor, which enzymatically renders them inert.

== Mechanism ==
Almost all airborne particulate matter carries a charge, either negative or positive. As air moves through an immobilized cell technology system, those charged particles are attracted to a water cascade, that functions as neutral ground, and that pulls the particulates into the bioreactor. (These airborne particulates consist of inert materials [dust, pollen, etc.], volatile organic compounds, and hazardous air pollutants.)

Once inside the bioreactor, the particulates are oxidized in a solution of water, enzymes, and bacteria breaking them down into base elements. Oxidation through immobilized cell technology is 12 times more efficient than natural oxidation is under the same conditions.

The key difference between traditional air filtration systems and those that employ immobilized cell technology is that the latter does not employ mesh filters. It requires water, electrical power, and biomass for the bioreactor. The base, inert, elements it produces need to be removed periodically.
