= Vanish (stain remover) =

Stain removing brand from Reckitt Benckiser

- Product type: Stain remover
- Current owner: Reckitt Benckiser
- Country: Netherlands
- Introduced: 1983; 43 years ago
- Previous owners: Economics Laboratory

Vanish is a brand of stain removing products owned by the Anglo-Dutch company Reckitt and sold in Australia, India, Spain, Poland, Indonesia, Russia, South Africa, Latin America and other countries.

== History ==
Most Vanish products are designed for removing stains from clothing, with some for removing stains from carpets and upholstery.

In Australia, Vanish has replaced "Preen" in media advertising voiceovers as the name for the pre-treat clothing stain remover, although "Vanish Preen" and "Vanish Napisan" continue to appear as sub-brands. Vanish's marketing slogan, as of January 2011, is "Trust Pink, Forget Stains".

Vanish is the global stain-remover market leader in the fabric-treatment category, which is sold in more than 60 countries across the globe. Vanish started as a stain-removing laundry product launched around 1983 by a small Scottish company called Projectina Co Ltd, established by Robert G. Macfarlane in Skelmorlie, Scotland. The brand was acquired by Ecolab in 1986, and became a Benckiser brand in 1987 when the latter acquired Ecolab's consumer-goods operations. Benckiser N.V. merged with Reckitt & Colman PLC in 1999 to form Reckitt Benckiser PLC. The Vanish name is now applied to a wide range of stain removing products across a broad range of textile materials, now including curtains and carpets. Reckitt has several subsidiary entities worldwide, such as RB N.V. based in the Netherlands, the entity that holds the trademarks for the Vanish brand.

== In North America ==
In North America, Vanish is under the Resolve brand name. It was originally produced by Lehn and Fink, the makers of all-purpose cleaner Lysol and rodenticide d-CON. The Resolve brand was the American version of Vanish. Currently, the brand is a carpet cleaner. The name is Resolve in order to avoid confusion with the toilet bowl cleaner of the same name.
