= Reckitt =

British multinational consumer goods company

- Reckitt's logo since 23 March 2021
- Trade name: Reckitt
- Type: Public
- Traded as: LSE: RKT; FTSE 100 Component
- ISIN: GB00B24CGK77
- Industry: Consumer goods
- Predecessor: Colmans
- Founded: 1814; 212 years ago (J&J Colman); 1823; 203 years ago (Benckiser); 1840; 186 years ago (Reckitt & Sons); 1938; 88 years ago (merger of Reckitt & Sons and J&J Colman); 1999; 27 years ago (merger of Reckitt & Colman and Benckiser)
- Founders: Isaac Reckitt (Reckitt & Sons branch); Jeremiah Colman (J&J Colman branch); Johann Benckiser (Benckiser N.V. branch); Edward Mead Johnson (Mead Johnson branch)
- Headquarters: Stockley Park, United Kingdom
- Area served: Worldwide
- Key people: Sir Jeremy Darroch (Chairman); Kris Licht (CEO)
- Products: Cleaning agents; skin care; personal care; nutrition; pharmaceutical and consumer healthcare
- Revenue: ▲£14,205 million (2025)
- Operating income: ▲£4,217 million (2025)
- Net income: ▲£3,187 million (2025)
- Number of employees: 40,000 (2026)
- Subsidiaries: Mead Johnson; UpSpring
- Website: reckitt.com

Reckitt is a British multinational consumer goods company headquartered in Slough, United Kingdom. It manufactures health and hygiene products.

Reckitt's brands include the antiseptic brand Dettol, the sore throat medicine Strepsils, the toilet cleaner Harpic, the hair removal brand Veet, the cold, flu, and cough relief brand Mucinex, the indigestion remedy Gaviscon, the pain relief medication Nurofen and other brands and products like: Durex, Lysol, Finish, and Vanish.

The company was formed in 1999 by the merger of British company Reckitt & Colman plc and Dutch company Benckiser N.V. Following the merger, the company was known as Reckitt Benckiser until 2021.

== History ==
=== Origins ===
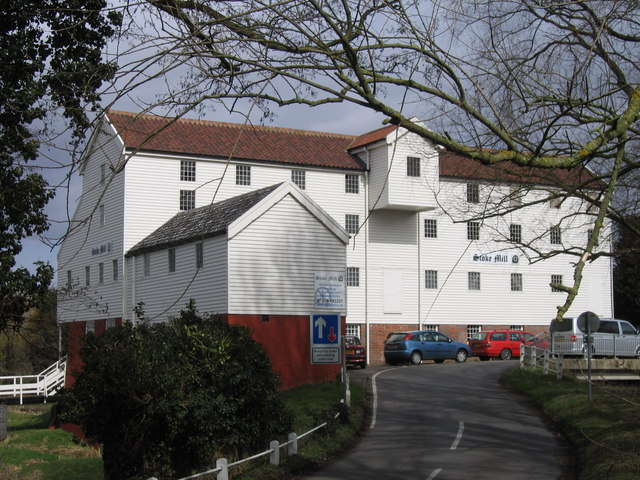
Stoke Holy Cross Mill, in Norwich, England, the home of Colman's mustard from 1814 to 1862

Historical logos

First logo, used from 1999 to 2009

Second logo, circa 2009 to 2014

Third logo, used from 2014 to 2021

Johann Benckiser founded a business in Pforzheim, Germany, in 1823. Its core business was industrial chemicals. Ludwig Reimann, a chemist, joined the business in 1828 and married Benckiser's daughter. Benckiser died in 1851 and the business came under Reimann's ownership. Reimann opened a new chemical plant and, in 1858, moved it to Ludwigshafen. Under Reimann's descendants the business grew rapidly in the latter half of the 20th century: it acquired Coty, Inc., a North American beauty products manufacturer, in 1992. Benckiser's other products included Vanish and Cillit Bang. It went public in 1997.

Reckitt & Sons started in 1840 when Isaac Reckitt rented a starch mill in Hull, England. He diversified into other household products and after his death in 1862, the business passed to his three sons. In 1886, Reckitt opened its first overseas business in Australia. The firm was first listed on the London Stock Exchange in 1888. Harpic Lavatory Cleaners was acquired in 1932, and that same year, Dettol was launched.

In 1938, Reckitt & Sons merged with J. & J. Colman, which had been founded in 1814 when Jeremiah Colman began milling flour and mustard in Norwich, England, to become Reckitt & Colman Ltd. The company made several acquisitions, including the Airwick and Carpet Fresh brands (1985), the Spanish cleaning products company Camp (1989), the Boyle-Midway division of American Home Products (1990), and the Lehn & Fink division of Sterling Drug, maker of Lysol disinfectant (1994). The Lehn & Fink purchase doubled Reckitt & Colman's American business in one stroke. It acquired several brands from DowBrands in 1998.

Reckitt & Colman also made several divestments during this time, including the fine arts and graphical products (with brands such as Winsor & Newton) and Conimex Dutch food business in 1990, Colman's of Norwich UK food business and Robinsons soft drink products in 1995 to Unilever, and Keen's Australian and Canadian food business in 1998.

=== 1999 to present ===
The company was formed by a merger between Britain's Reckitt & Colman plc and the Dutch company Benckiser NV in December 1999. Bart Becht became CEO of the new company and has been credited for its transformation, focusing on core brands and improving efficiency in the supply chain. The new management team's strategy of "innovation marketing" – a combination of increased marketing spend and product innovation, focusing on consumer needs – has been linked to the company's ongoing success. For example, in 2008, the company's "rapid succession of well publicised new product variants" were credited for helping them "to capture shoppers' imagination". Business Week has also noted that "40% of Reckitt Benckiser's $10.5 billion in 2007 revenues came from products launched within the previous three years."

In October 2005, Reckitt purchased the over-the-counter drugs manufacturing business of Boots, Boots Healthcare International, for £1.9 billion. The three main brands acquired were Nurofen's analgesics, Strepsils sore throat lozenges, and Clearasil anti-acne treatments. In January 2008, Reckitt acquired Adams Respiratory Therapeutics, a pharmaceutical company, for $2.3 billion; one of the major brands acquired was Mucinex. Reckitt acquired SSL International, the manufacturer of Durex condoms and Scholl's footcare products, for £2.5 billion in July 2010.

In January 2011, the company purchased Combe's cold remedy/skin care business. In September 2011, Bart Becht retired as CEO of Reckitt Benckiser, being replaced by executive vice-president of Category Development, Rakesh Kapoor, who had played a key role in recent acquisitions.

On 27 August 2011, Reckitt recalled all remaining stock of its major analgesic product, Nurofen Plus, after packs were found to contain an antipsychotic drug. It turned out that this was the work of a codeine addict who had been stealing the pills and replacing them with their antipsychotic medication.

In November 2012, Reckitt acquired Schiff Nutrition, a Salt Lake City-based manufacturer of vitamins and nutritional supplements including Digestive Advantage, MegaRed, Airborne, and Move Free, for US$1.4 billion (£877 million). In December 2014, Reckitt spun off its speciality pharmaceuticals business, which produces Suboxone (an opioid withdrawal medication), into a separate company named Indivior.

In 2014, Reckitt Benckiser dropped its full name in favour of the RB brand. According to Kapoor, the old name was "a bit of a mouthful" and the name change would make life easier.'

In February 2017, the company bid $16.7 billion for the American infant formula maker Mead Johnson. In February 2017, Reckitt Benckiser announced it had bought Mead Johnson for $16.6 billion. To effect the transaction, Reckitt Benckiser incorporated a subsidiary in Delaware into which Mead Johnson Nutrition would be transferred, with Mead Johnson Nutrition being the sole surviving entity at completion. Following the acquisition of Mead Johnson, Reckitt Benckiser split its business into two divisions: consumer healthcare, and home and hygiene. While some expert analysts viewed this move as a precursor to a possible sale of the home division, Kapoor said that it was only to improve the performance of each of the divisions.

In July 2017, McCormick acquired Reckitt's food brands, including French's Mustard & Frank's RedHot, for $4.2 billion, subject to regulatory approval.

Kapoor retired in September 2019 and was replaced by Laxman Narasimhan, PepsiCo's global chief commercial officer. Narasimhan developed a turnaround strategy designed to rejuvenate the company "following a series of missteps and lacklustre growth that marked the final years of his predecessor".

In March 2021, the company rebranded from RB to Reckitt - including a new logo and visual identity as a next step in delivering on the strategic purpose of the company.

On 1 September 2022, Reckitt announced that Narasimhan had chosen to resign as CEO, citing "personal and family reasons", and would relinquish his position at the end of the month. It was also revealed that he is expected to become the next CEO of Starbucks. Narasimhan's unexpected departure "came as an unwelcome shock to shareholders", with the company's share price falling by "more than 5 per cent in early trading [...] before recovering somewhat to 4.5 per cent below their opening price" on the day of the announcement.

Senior Independent Director Nicandro Durante was appointed to serve as CEO on an "interim" basis "while the board considers a longer-term replacement".

== Operations ==
Reckitt is headquartered in Slough, Berkshire, England, and has operations in around 60 countries. Its products are sold in nearly 200 countries. Reckitt organises the majority of its products into three main categories – health, hygiene and home – with other brands belonging to three further categories: food, pharmaceuticals and portfolio brands. The company's strategy is to have a highly focused portfolio concentrating on its 19 most profitable brands, which are responsible for 70% of net revenues.

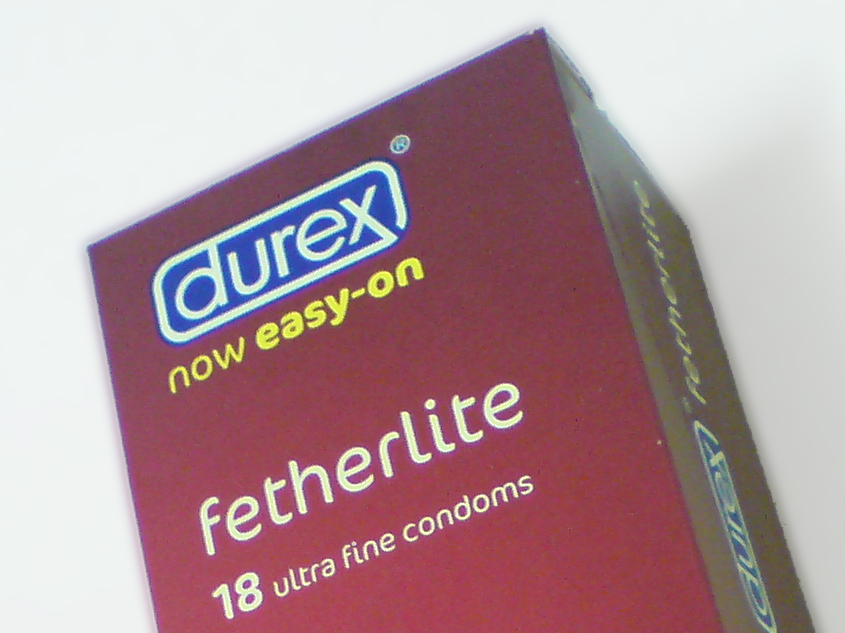
Durex condoms

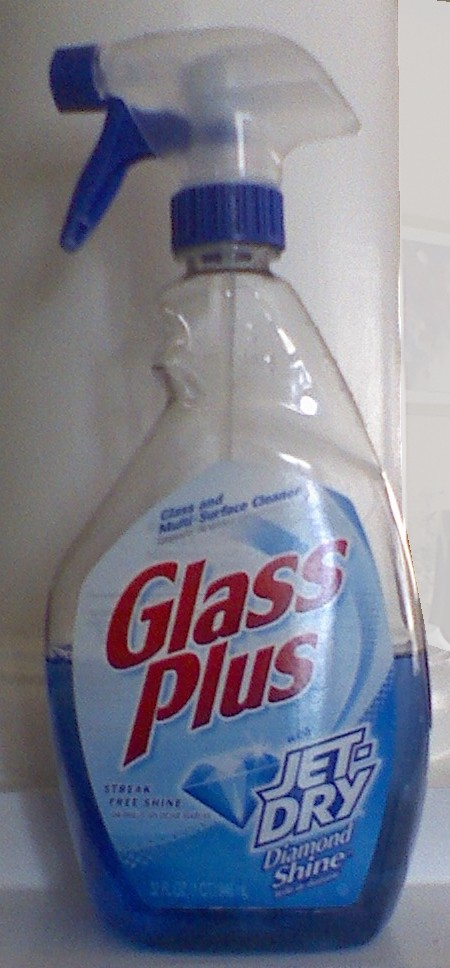
Glass Plus glass cleaner

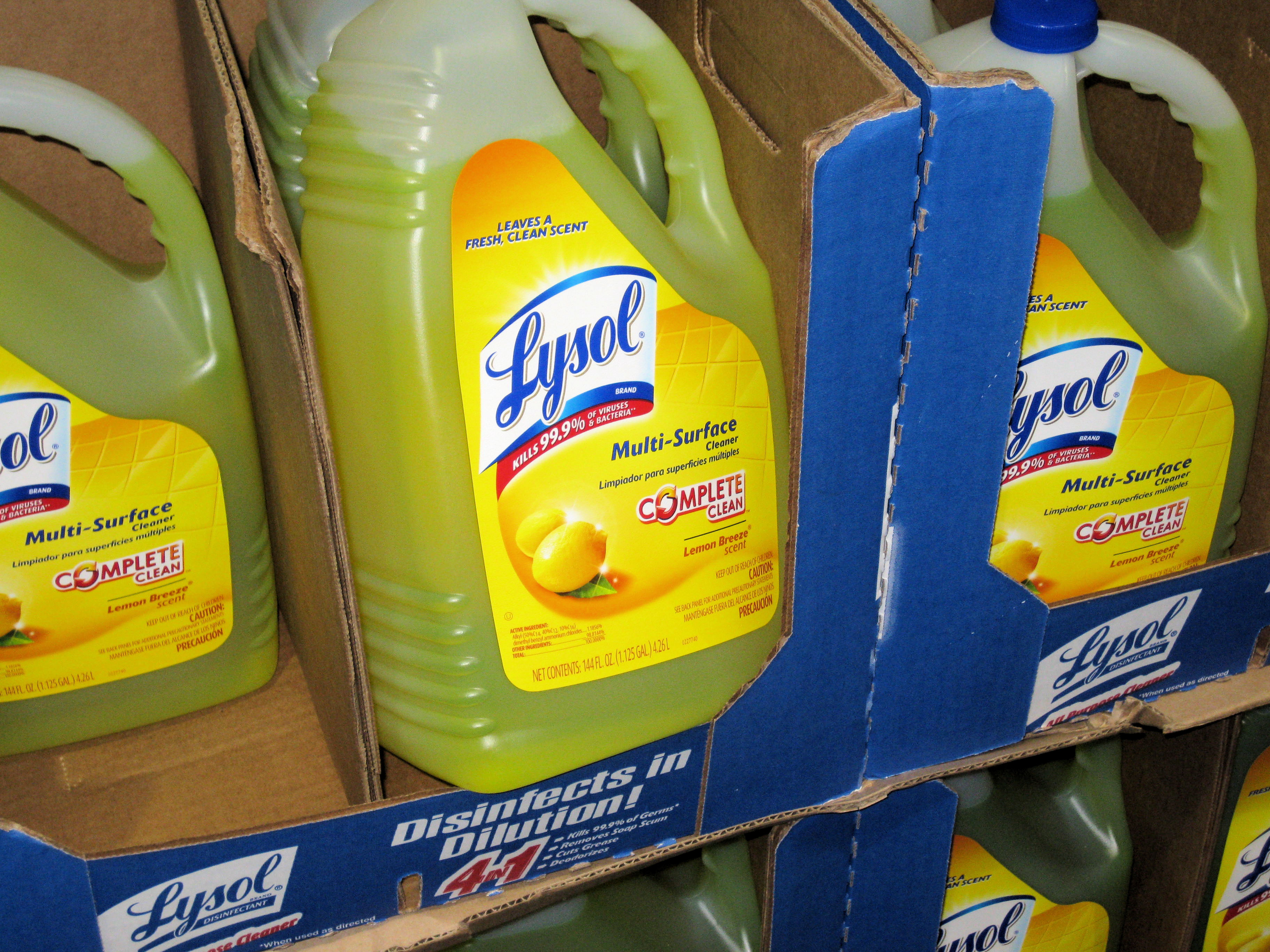
Lysol multi-surface cleaner

Strepsils throat lozenges

== Corporate governance ==
As of 2020, Reckitt's directors were: Christopher Sinclair (chairman), Laxman Narasimhan (CEO), Jeff Carr (CFO), Andrew Bonfield, Nicandro Durante, Mary Harris, Dr. Mehmood Khan, Dr. Pamela Kirby, Sara Mathew, Elane Stock, and Warren Tucker. As of 2020, members of the executive committee were: Laxman Narasimhan (CEO), Rupert Bondy (General Counsel), Jeff Carr (CFO), Kris Licht, Aditya Sehgal, Ranjay Radhakrishnan, and Harold van den Broek.

From the company's creation in 1999 until he retired in 2011, Bart Becht was CEO. The Guardian called him "one of the most successful businessmen of his generation". Under him, the company focused on its core brands, and on improving efficiency in the supply chain. It also increased its marketing budget. BusinessWeek noted that "40% of Reckitt's $10.5 billion in 2007 revenues came from products launched within the previous three years". Becht was Britain's highest-paid businessman, taking home more than £90 million in 2009. In April 2011, he announced that he would step down in September of that year, to be replaced by Rakesh Kapoor, who had been with the company since 1987. Reckitt Benckiser shares fell by 6.6% on the news.

== Lawsuit ==
In New York in February 2009, Earthjustice filed a lawsuit against Reckitt and others. The petition seeks to compel the companies to identify all of the ingredients used in their products. Earthjustice contacted several companies in September 2008 requesting that they comply with a 1971 law requiring them to disclose the ingredients in their products and make available any associated health or safety studies. Reckitt and the other defendants ignored or refused the request. Earthjustice eventually lost the case, after which it lobbied the New York State Department of Environmental Conservation, which in 2018 unveiled new requirements for manufacturers of cleaning products to publicly detail their ingredients.

== Controversies ==
=== Deaths caused by humidifier disinfectant ===
In 2001, Reckitt Benckiser acquired the South Korean Oxy brand from Oriental Chemical Industries. Since 1996, Oxy had been using polyhexamethylene guanidine (PHMG) in a humidifier steriliser product called Oxy Ssak Ssak (옥시싹싹). In 2011, the use of PHMG was dropped when the Korea Centers for Disease Control and Prevention (KCDC) published a report showing a link between the compound and lung damage and deaths. Several other companies in South Korea made humidifier sterilisers with PHMG between 2001 and 2011.

According to a BBC report in May 2016, about 500 people, many of them women and children, are reported to have died or been injured after inhaling PHMG. According to an April 2016 report by The Korea Herald, in 2015, 750 disinfectant users had requested a test to determine if they had been harmed by the disinfectant and as of the date of that report, 221 users had officially been confirmed to have been affected and full results were expected to be released late in 2017. A report on Sina.com in May 2016 said that PHMG was known to have caused 70 deaths and to have harmed the lungs of 177 people, with the actual total of deaths and injuries unknown.

Reckitt Benckiser Korea has been blamed for 103 deaths by a coalition of consumer groups in South Korea; a report from The Korea Herald in April 2016 said that the firm had been blamed for 221 deaths.

Sometime after the release of the KCDC report, prosecutors in South Korea opened an investigation into the companies selling the disinfectants, which increased its pace in January 2016. Reckitt Benckiser Korea submitted a toxicity report on PHMG to prosecutors in January 2016; prosecutors were also investigating allegations that the company suppressed data showing PHMG to be toxic in the report it had submitted. In April 2016, a coalition of consumer groups called for a boycott of the company.

In May 2016, Korean division chief Ataur "Ata" Safdar apologised to victims and families in a press conference and offered financial compensation to the families of those who died and to those who were injured; it was the first time the company had admitted that its products containing PHMG were potentially harmful and caused fatalities.

In the end, it resulted in the exposure of dozens of other humidifier disinfectant products by dozens of other companies with PHMG, chloromethylchloroisothiazolinone (CMIT), methylisothiazolinone (MIT) and oligo(2-(2-ethoxy)-ethoxyethyl)guanidinium-chloride (PGH), and the South Korean government officially recognized 1,814 dead and 7,837 injured victims, however, according to Korea national apparatus, Social Disasters Commission, including unreported cases, estimated 20,366 deaths, 950,000 health damages, and 8,940,000 exposures occurred between 1994 and 2011 due to PHMG only, with Reckitt Benckiser's humidifier disinfectant product, Oxy Ssak Ssak (옥시싹싹) being the humidifier disinfectant product with the largest amount of victims with 221 confirmed deaths and 300 confirmed health damages.

=== Cillit Bang viral marketing controversy ===
Cillit Bang television advertisements have been presented by "Barry Scott", a brashly enthusiastic character played by Neil Burgess, who claims that Cillit Bang can remove limescale, rust and ground-in dirt. In one advert, he places a copper English one penny coin in Cillit Bang to demonstrate the product's cleaning ability to remove staining. International versions of the advert use different presenters, known as Martin Grellis in Australia and New Zealand, and Dan Dolan in North America, although some spots feature Neil Burgess as Barry Scott. The North American versions of the advertisement use the appropriate one-cent coin (a Lincoln cent in the United States, a 1953–1964 one cent coin in Canada). The company claimed that the coin would be clean in 15 seconds: however the Advertising Standards Agency said the claim was misleading.

In 2005 advertising agency Cohn & Wolfe was contracted by Reckitt to operate a blog as the fictional character Barry Scott as a viral marketing platform. In October of that year blogger Tom Coates wrote an emotional post to his own blog about his long-estranged father. Among the expressions of condolences and sympathy in the post's comment section was one from a user identifying themselves as Barry Scott, with a link back to the Cohn & Wolfe's in-character blog as Barry Scott. Offended by the apparent use of his blog comments on such a personal post as a spam advertising venue, Coates traced the comment's originating IP address through addresses owned by Young & Rubicam and back to Reckitt. Reckitt initially denied responsibility for the message but later wrote Coates an apology acknowledging the message's inappropriateness, and Cohn & Wolfe issued a statement of remorse for their misuse of the "experimental" blog which they then ceased operating.

The controversy and its fallout led to further discussions among the blogger community as well as the advertising industry on the ethical issues surrounding blogs being "operated" by fictional characters for the purposes of advertising without being clearly labeled as such, and the extent to which those blogs should be allowed to participate in the greater blogosphere.

The Barry Scott adverts were parodied by Peter Serafinowicz on The Peter Serafinowicz Show. In the parodies, the host "Derek Baum" (played by Serafinowicz) markets a product called Kitchen Gun, which is a firearm that the host uses to blast away at kitchen surfaces and appliances, cleaning and damaging them at the same time, and Toilet Grenade, a hand grenade covered in white paint that demolishes the toilet bowl to eliminate limescale and germs.

=== Anti-competitive behaviour ===
In 2008, the BBC's Newsnight accused Reckitt Benckiser of attempting to delay the introduction of a competitive, generic version of one of its most popular products, Gaviscon, a treatment for heartburn and gastroesophageal reflux disease. In his introduction, reporter Martin Shankleman said:

Gaviscon is hailed as a power brand by its owners, Reckitt Benckiser ... Reckitt Benckiser likes to claim that the profits flow from their expertise in marketing. But we know that there's another way in which they've been coining it in—by ripping-off the NHS, as a whistle-blower has told us. The "whistle-blower" was shown in silhouette, and his words were spoken by an actor: "Reckitt's cheated the National Health Service. It could have saved the NHS millions of pounds. But not just the NHS, patients, doctors—they've cheated health professionals. I felt it had to be exposed". He continued, "Newsnight claimed that Reckitt had a "secret plan to ensure that it kept its stranglehold" after the Gaviscon patent expired in 1999, and that Newsnight had seen the plan. The Department of Health asked Newsnight to hand its documents to the NHS counter-fraud service.

The investigation was widely reported in the British press. The Guardian quoted a leaked memo in which the product's manager explained that the company could use "the rationale of health and safety" to design a switched product to "muddy the waters". The newspaper quoted Reckitt as stating that the leaked memos were "inappropriate and did not reflect Reckitt's eventual actions".

The Independent quoted Warwick Smith, director of the British Generic Manufacturers Association: "The sort of evergreening alleged by Newsnight can cost the NHS tens of millions of pounds with no patient benefit." It also quoted a statement issued by the company: "...RB is a responsible company and we have therefore instigated an immediate internal investigation and will take action. However, we do not accept much of what has been alleged."

The Times noted that "Although Gaviscon has been out of patent for almost ten years, no other manufacturer has developed a cheap generic version. Such a drug could have saved the NHS up to £40 million." It stated that the Office of Fair Trading was expected to examine whether Reckitt had acted illegally. It also printed verbatim extracts from several of the leaked memos.

In response to the Newsnight report and the reports in the press, Reckitt issued a statement that began:

We are shocked by the allegations made as Reckitt Benckiser is a responsible company in the way it conducts its business.

Nevertheless, we are deeply concerned by the inappropriate sentiment expressed in some of the historic internal correspondence reported. We take this very seriously and have instigated an immediate internal investigation, and will take action. We also refute much of what has been reported which implies a power and influence we simply do not possess.

The company has never objected to a monograph driven generic name being published. The timetable of which is not, and never has been, within our control a monograph/generic name could have been published at any time by the regulators without reference to any third party.

The company made appropriate challenges where it felt it was justified in order to ensure patients are prescribed the right treatment. These were within the law and relevant regulations. We stress that the regulators only take a comment into account when it is valid.

On 15 October 2010, Reckitt was fined £10.2 million by the Office of Fair Trading after the company admitted anti-competitive behaviour.

In 2014, the Autorité de la concurrence in France found that Reckitt had colluded with 12 other multinational companies (Colgate-Palmolive, Henkel, Unilever, Procter & Gamble, Sara Lee, SC Johnson, Bolton Solitaire, Laboratoires Vendôme, Gillette, L'Oréal, Beiersdorf and Vania) to fix the prices of popular personal hygiene products; the fine of around €950 million was the largest ever imposed by the agency.

In 2015, Reckitt created controversy when it emerged that seemingly different versions of their product Nurofen marketed to treat specific pains, such as migraine, were all identical to the standard product despite costing twice as much. The product was withdrawn from sale in Australia for misleading consumers. The Australian Competition & Consumer Commission (ACCC) took the matter to court and in December 2016, Reckitt was fined A$6 million.

=== Legal challenges to rodenticide regulations ===
In 2008, the United States Environmental Protection Agency (EPA) announced a decision to remove second-generation anticoagulant rodenticides from store shelves, leaving the products available for purchase only by US licensed applicators. The ruling was slated to go into effect in 2011 allowing poison companies time to adjust to the new law. EPA's decision was based on tens of thousands of reports of pet, wildlife and child poisonings that resulted annually from rat poisons in the US alone. In 2011, Reckitt Benckiser makers of d-CON products initiated a legal challenge to the EPA expected to take several years to resolve. Early in 2014, California State Department of Pesticide Regulation ruled that anticoagulant rat poison sales would be restricted beginning on 1 July 2014. Reckitt filed suit in San Diego County Superior Court in April 2014 to block the decision, but eventually reached an agreement with the EPA to phase out the products in June 2014; production of the banned products stopped on 31 December 2014, with distribution to retailers ceased on 31 March 2015, although retailers will be allowed to keep the banned products in stock until they are all sold out.

=== Palm oil procurement ===
According to a 2016 Amnesty International report, Reckitt Benckiser is one of several major consumer goods companies that purchase palm oil from Wilmar International, the world's largest palm oil refiner. Amnesty's investigation revealed that Wilmar profits from child labour and forced labour and exposes workers to toxic banned chemicals.

=== Opioid marketing ===
In 2019, Reckitt paid a $1.4bn fine for claiming opioid medication Suboxone Film was "safer ... even though such claims have never been established."

=== Controversy regarding operations in Russia ===
Reckitt Benckiser has faced criticism for continuing its operations in Russia despite the invasion of Ukraine and widespread international sanctions. In April 2022, the company announced plans to transfer ownership of its Russian business to a third party or local employees but did not complete the process as of 2024. Trading data reveals that Reckitt Benckiser continues to export products to Russia, raising concerns about its commitment to disengaging from the market. While the company has frozen capital investments, advertising, sponsorships, and promotions in Russia, its ongoing presence has drawn scrutiny in light of Russia's continued aggression and violations of international law.
