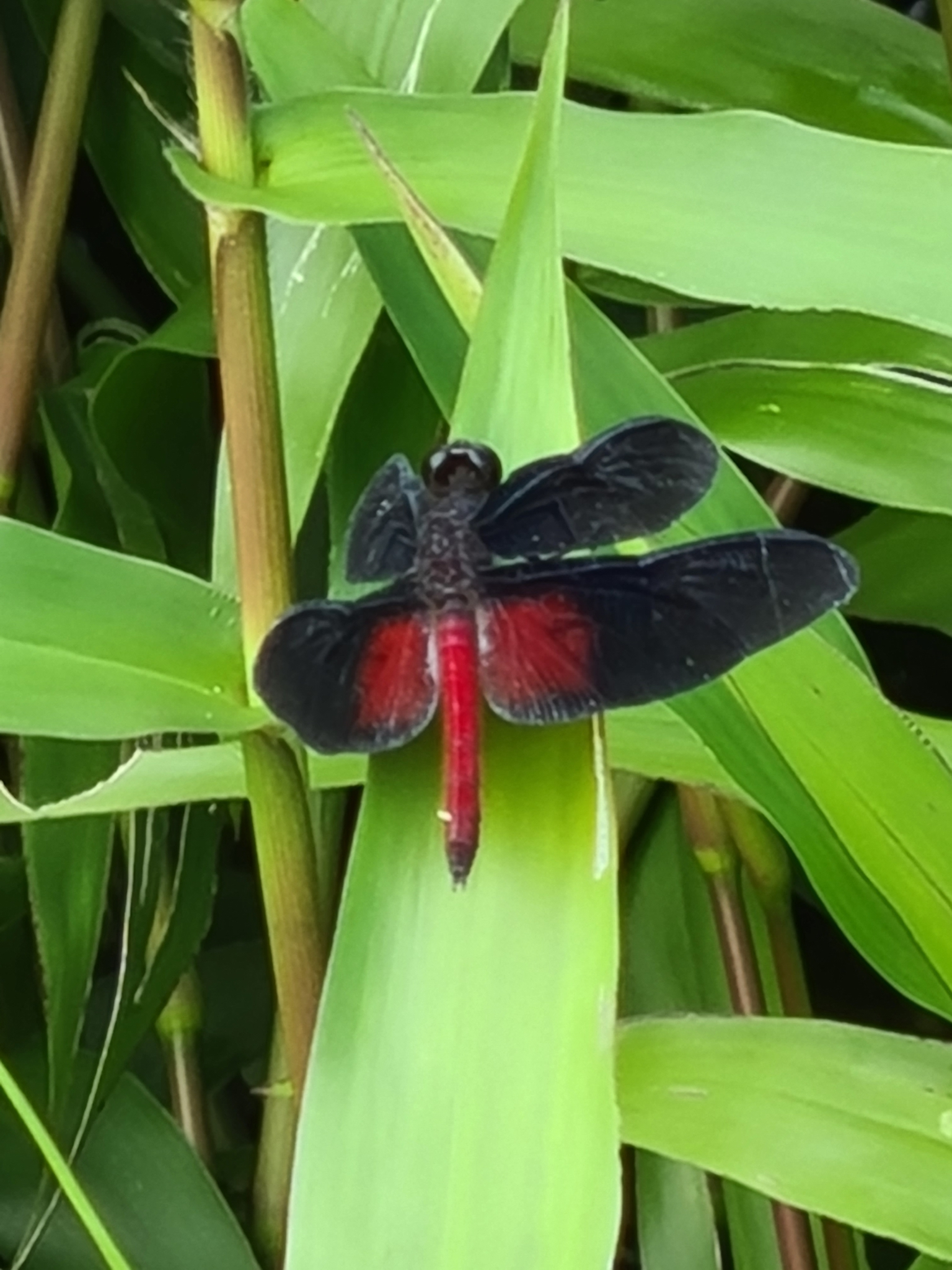

Conservation status
- Least Concern (IUCN 3.1)

Scientific classification
- Kingdom: Animalia
- Phylum: Arthropoda
- Clade: Pancrustacea
- Class: Insecta
- Order: Odonata
- Suborder: Anisoptera
- Superfamily: Libelluloidea
- Family: Libellulidae
- Genus: Diastatops
- Species: D. pullata

Binomial name
- Diastatops pullata (Burmeister, 1839)

Synonyms
- Diastatops fuliginea Rambur, 1842; Libellula pullata Burmeister, 1839

= Diastatops pullata =

Species of dragonfly

Diastatops pullata is a species of dragonfly in the family Libellulidae, native to ponds and marshes in lowlands of tropical South America.

== Description ==
They are big, a little less than 40 mm. The male has red stains on the wings and a bright red abdomen. Females have faded stains instead and a pale orange abdomen.

== Similar species ==
These species are similar and get confused easily.

- Diastatops intensa

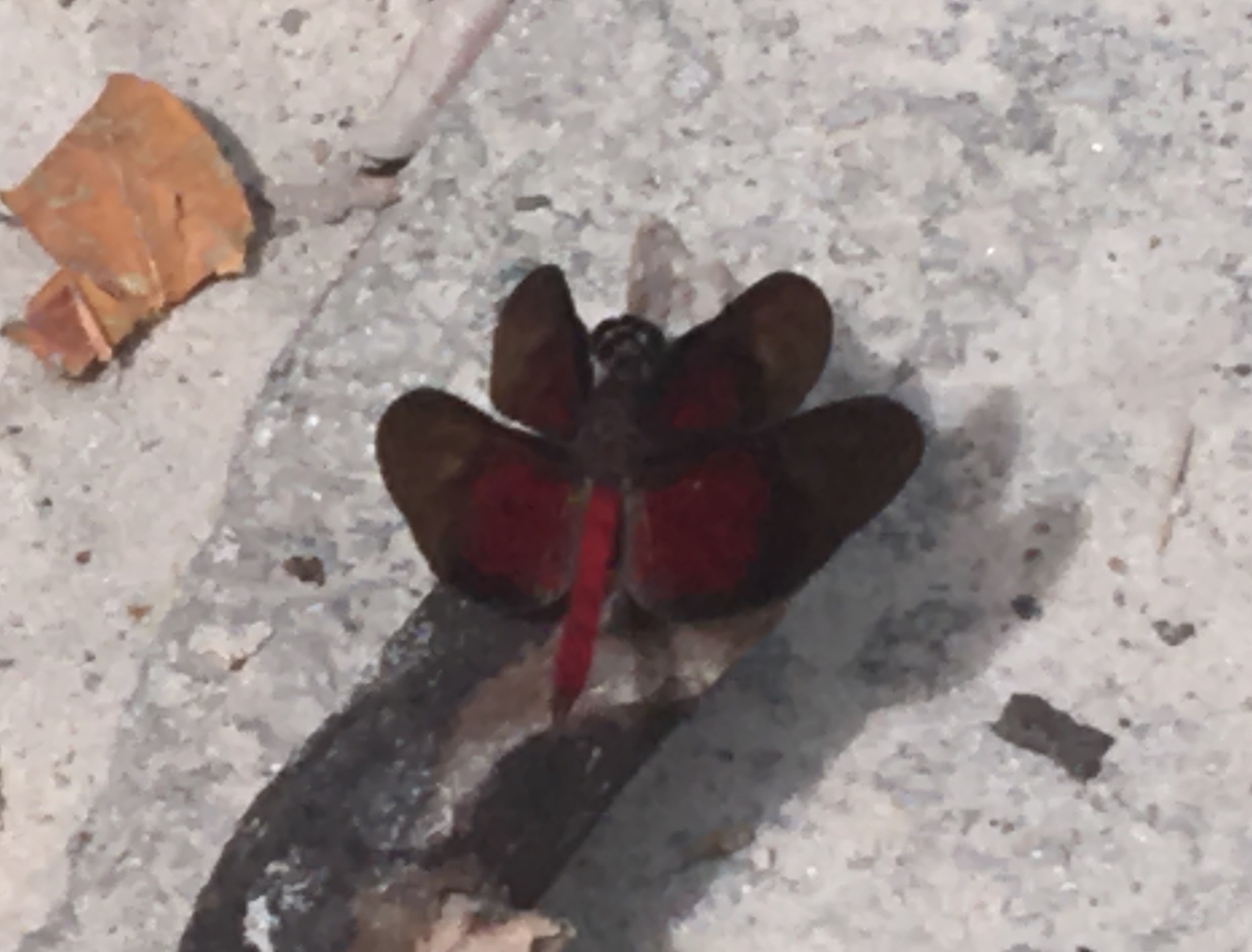

- Diastatops obscura

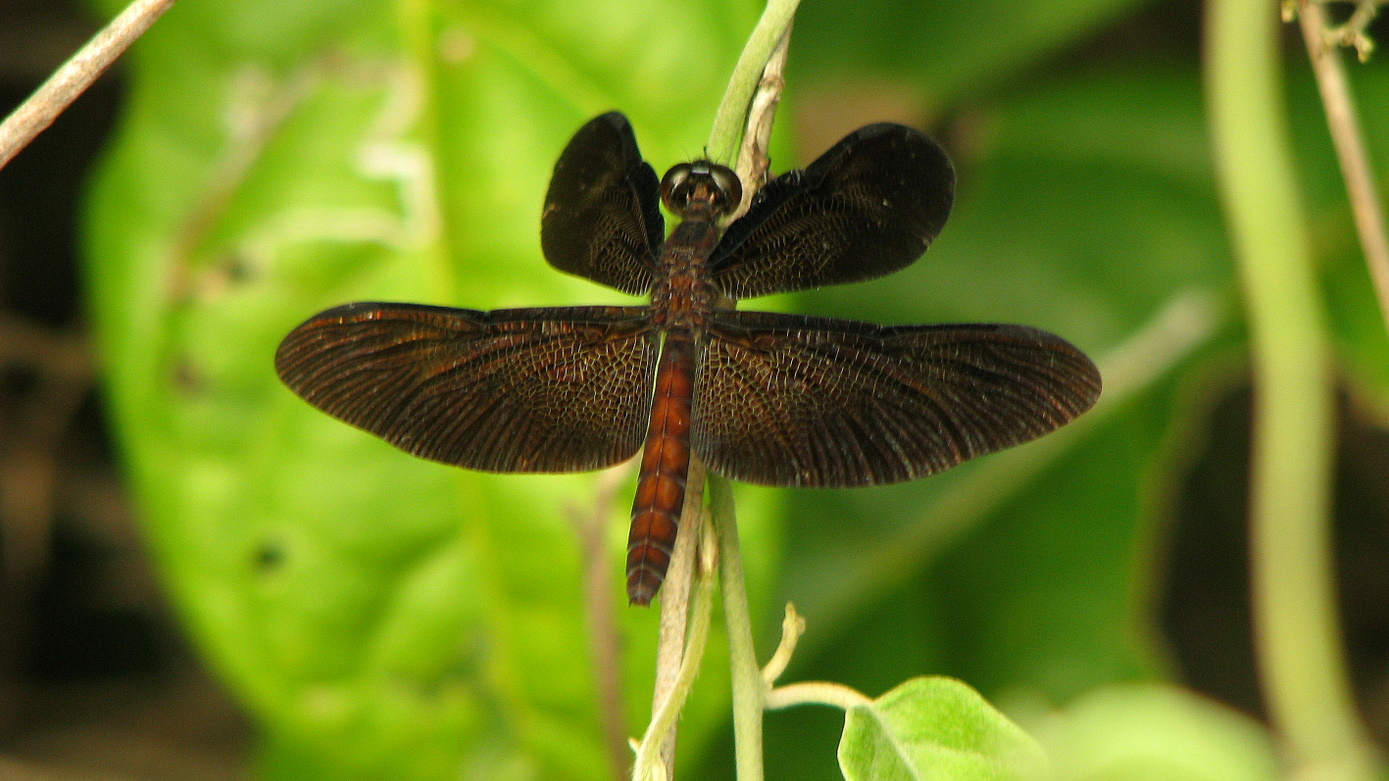
