= Laxman Narasimhan =

American business executive (born 1967)

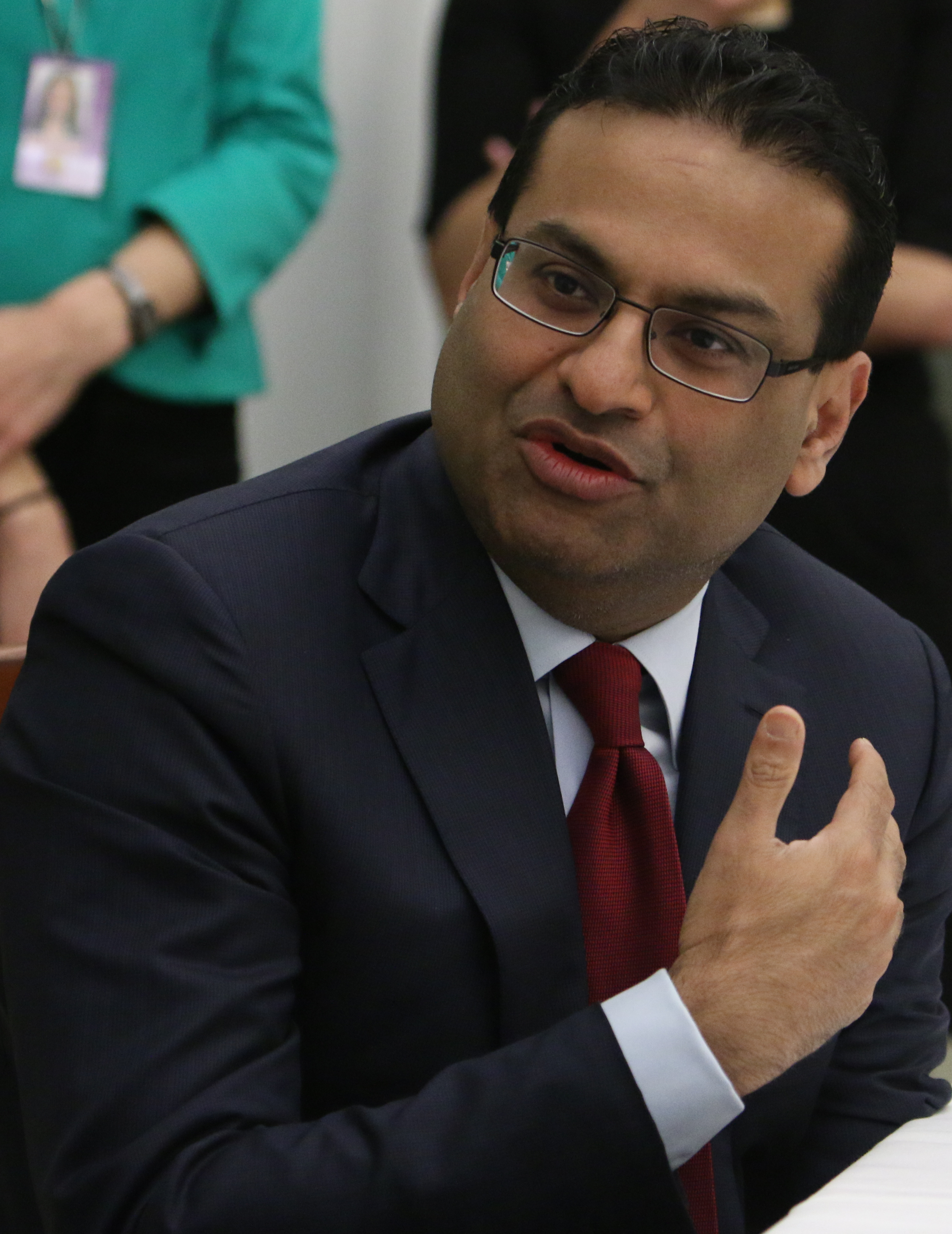
- Narasimhan in 2017
- Born: 15 May 1967 (age 59); Pune, India
- Education: College of Engineering, Pune (BTech); University of Pennsylvania (MA, MBA)
- Title: Former CEO of Starbucks and Reckitt
- Predecessor: Howard Schultz (acting); Kevin Johnson
- Successor: Brian Niccol
- Children: 2

Laxman Narasimhan (born 15 May 1967) is an Indian-American business executive who is a director of Verizon and Pendulum Therapeutics, and a trustee for the Brookings Institution. He is the former chief executive officer (CEO) of Starbucks and Reckitt.

He was previously chief commercial officer (CCO) of PepsiCo. He joined Starbucks as interim CEO in October 2022, and succeeded Howard Schultz as CEO in April 2023, a position from which he departed by August 2024.

== Early life ==
Narasimhan was born on May 15, 1967, in Pune, India into a Hindu family. He earned a degree in mechanical engineering from the College of Engineering, Pune, an MA in international studies from the Lauder Institute at the University of Pennsylvania, and an MBA in finance from the Wharton School, also at the University of Pennsylvania.

== Career ==
Narasimhan worked for McKinsey for 19 years until 2012. He worked across the Cleveland, Tokyo, Toronto, Silicon Valley, New Delhi and London offices, rising to director and location manager for their New Delhi office and overseeing work for consumer-facing companies across Asia.

Narasimhan joined PepsiCo in 2012 and held a series of senior leadership roles, including Chief Financial Officer of PepsiCo Americas Foods, Chief Executive Officer of PepsiCo Latin America Foods, and Chief Executive Officer of the Latin America business unit. He later was Chief Commercial Officer, a newly created role overseeing marketing, research and development, strategy, and e-commerce across the company’s global operations.

In 2019, he was appointed Chief Commercial Officer of PepsiCo, where he was responsible for the company’s commercial capabilities and long-term growth strategy, reporting to the chief executive officer. Contemporary coverage in Bloomberg and Fortune described him as one of PepsiCo’s most senior executives and a key member of the company’s executive leadership team.

Narasimhan succeeded Rakesh Kapoor as CEO of Reckitt Benckiser in September 2019, formulating a turnaround plan which was intended to rejuvenate the company "following a series of missteps and lacklustre growth that marked the final years of his predecessor". While CEO, Narasimhan prioritized growth and investment in its health, nutrition and hygiene divisions while shedding noncore brands.

In September 2022, the company announced his resignation, explaining that he had "decided for personal and family reasons to relocate back to the United States and has been approached for an opportunity that enables him to live there."

In September 2022, Starbucks announced that Narasimhan would become the company's next CEO, succeeding Howard Schultz, who had been interim CEO since Kevin Johnson resigned in March 2022. Prior to Narasimhan taking over as CEO, he trained as a barista for six months to learn what operational changes, if any, needed to be made. The New York Times has described Narasimhan as less resistant to Starbucks unionization than Schultz.

In August 2024, Starbucks announced that Narasimhan would leave the company effective immediately, and was replaced by Chipotle CEO Brian Niccol.

In October 2025, he joined the board of directors at Pendulum Therapeutics, a microbiome science company.

== Personal life ==
Narasimhan is married and have two children, and lives in Greenwich, Connecticut. He speaks six languages.

== See also ==
- Indians in the New York City metropolitan area
