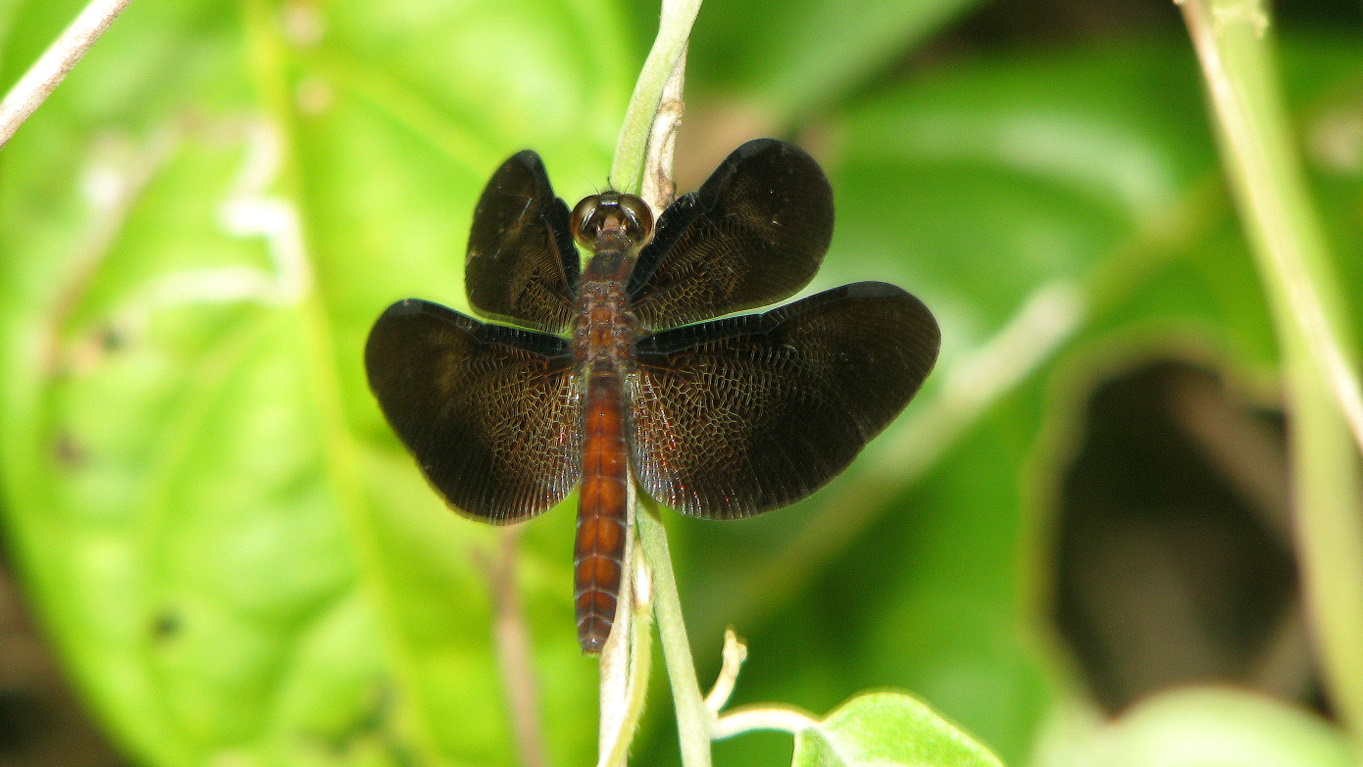

Scientific classification
- Kingdom: Animalia
- Phylum: Arthropoda
- Class: Insecta
- Order: Odonata
- Infraorder: Anisoptera
- Family: Libellulidae
- Subfamily: Palpopleurinae
- Genus: Diastatops; Rambur, 1842

Type species
- Diastatops pullata

= Diastatops =

Genus of dragonflies

Diastatops is a genus of dragonflies in the family Libellulidae from South America.

== Species ==
| Male | Female | Scientific name | Common name | Distribution |
|---|---|---|---|---|
| | | Diastatops dimidiata (Linnaeus, 1758) | | Guyanas |
| | | Diastatops emilia Montgomery, 1940 | | Brazil |
| | | Diastatops estherae Montgomery, 1940 | | Brazil |
| | | Diastatops intensa Montgomery, 1940 | | Brazil, Paraguay, Argentina |
| | | Diastatops maxima Montgomery, 1940 | | Brazil |
| | | Diastatops nigra Montgomery, 1940 | | Brazil |
| | | Diastatops obscura (Fabricius, 1775) | Red-tailed Blackwing | Brazil, Suriname, Peru, Paraguay |
| | | Diastatops pullata (Burmeister, 1839) | Red-saddled Blackwing | Suriname |
