= Rakesh Kapoor =

Indian businessman (born 1958)

- Born: 4 August 1958 (age 67); Bareilly, India
- Education: Modern School, New Delhi
- Alma mater: BITS Pilani; XLRI Jamshedpur
- Occupation: Businessman
- Title: Former CEO, Reckitt
- Term: 2011- 2019
- Predecessor: Bart Becht
- Successor: Laxman Narasimhan

Rakesh Kapoor (born 4 August 1958) is an Indian businessman. He was, until September 2019, chief executive (CEO) of Reckitt plc, a UK FTSE-listed multinational consumer goods company, a major producer of health, hygiene and home products.

== Early life ==
Kapoor was educated at Modern School, New Delhi, India. Kapoor has a BE (Hons) in Chemical Engineering from the Birla Institute of Technology and Science (BITS), Pilani, and an MBA from XLRI- Xavier School of Management, Jamshedpur, India.

== Career ==
Kapoor joined Reckitt & Colman in 1987, before the merger with Benckiser, serving in various roles including: Regional Sales Manager, North India; General Manager, Indian Southern Region; and Regional Marketing Director, South Asia. In 1999, he was appointed Global Category Director, Pest Control. Following the merger, he assumed the role of Senior Vice President, Home Care. He was appointed SVP, Regional Director, Northern Europe in 2001 and in July 2006, he was promoted to EVP, Category Development, with responsibility for global category management, research and development, media, market research and strategic alliances.

Following discussions with the Financial Services Authority, Reckitt Benckiser belatedly admitted in October 2012, that in 2010 Kapoor had secured a loan against £7.4m worth of shares in the company. Such undisclosed loans are considered more likely to distort an executive's behaviour than borrowings that are open and known to all. This issue of executive disclosures rose to prominence in 2008 when Carphone Warehouse co-founder David Ross had to resign after undisclosed use of £201 million in shares as collateral came to light. According to The Daily Telegraph, "A spokesman for the company said the failure to disclose the loans to the market was not the fault of Mr Kapoor who had told the company of the situation."

In January 2019, Reckitt Benckiser announced that Kapoor is set to retire by the end of 2019. Laxman Narasimhan, PepsiCo's chief commercial officer, will succeed Kapoor as CEO in September 2019.

=== Compensation ===
His salary for 2015 was £23.2 million. High Pay Centre spokesman Stefan Stern singled out an £18m share-based long term incentive payment (LTIP) to Kapoor for performance over three years to end of 2015. "We think these LTIPs are hopelessly flawed instruments. They're for three years, which isn't really long term, so they're badly named. They are clearly skewed if they can generate results like this, with a near 100% increase in package."

=== Investor backlash ===
In March 2014, in the wake of similar investor backlash protests over compensation for executives at Pearson, Barclays Bank, WPP, which are also listed on The Financial Times Stock Exchange 100 Index — a share index of the 100 companies listed on the London Stock Exchange with the highest market capitalization — over 40 per cent of Reckitt Benckiser shareholders refused to support the company's remuneration report.

== Personal life ==
Kapoor is an accomplished bridge player and a keen football and cricket fan.
