= List of ibuprofen brand names =

List of brand names that ibuprofen is sold under

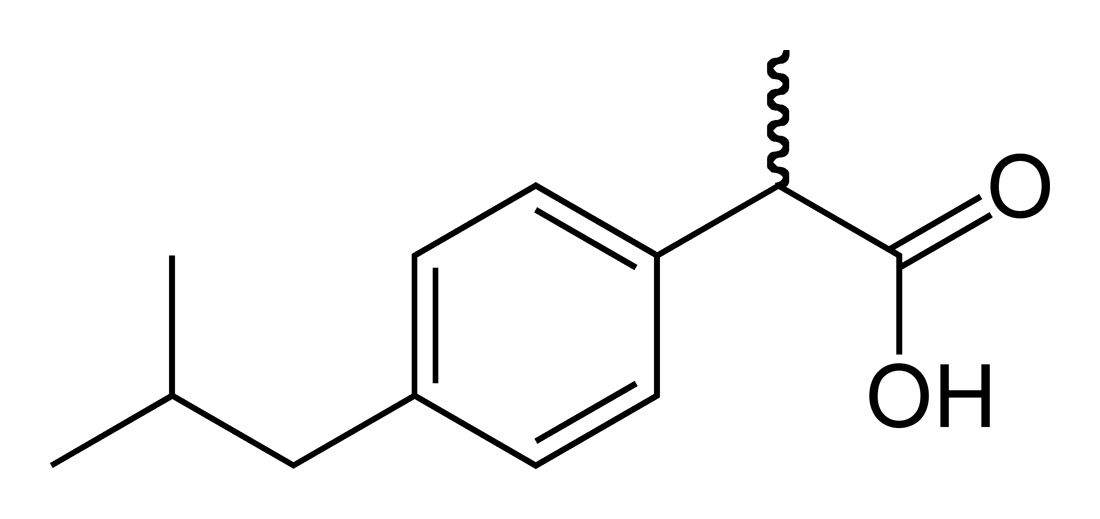

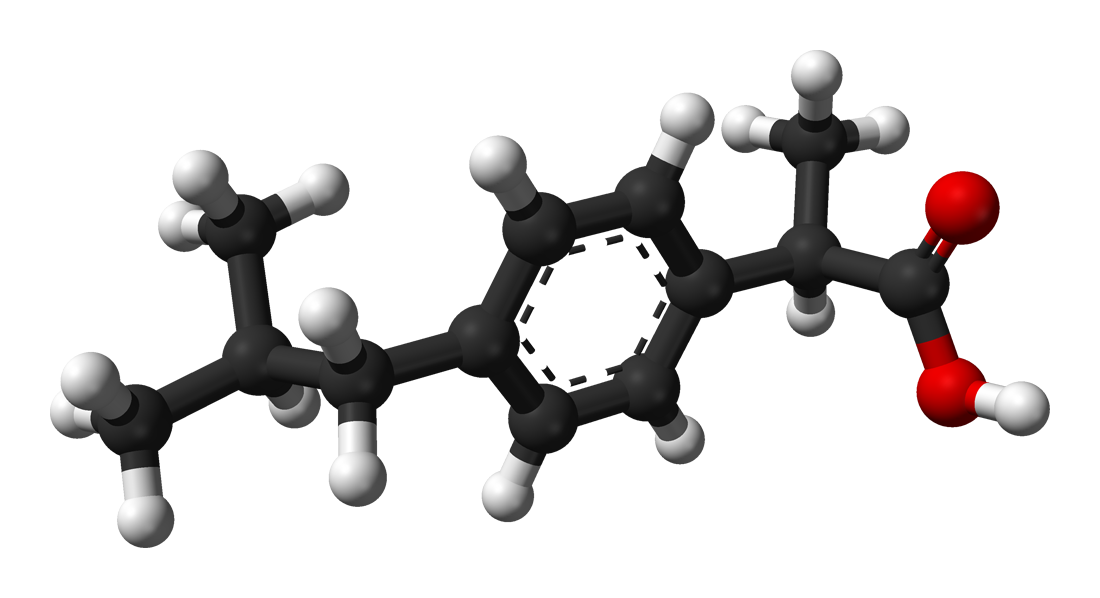
Ibuprofen

Ibuprofen, an analgesic and non-steroidal anti-inflammatory drug (NSAID), is sold under many brand names around the world. The most common are Brufen (its earliest registered trademark), Advil, Motrin, and Nurofen.

== List of brands ==
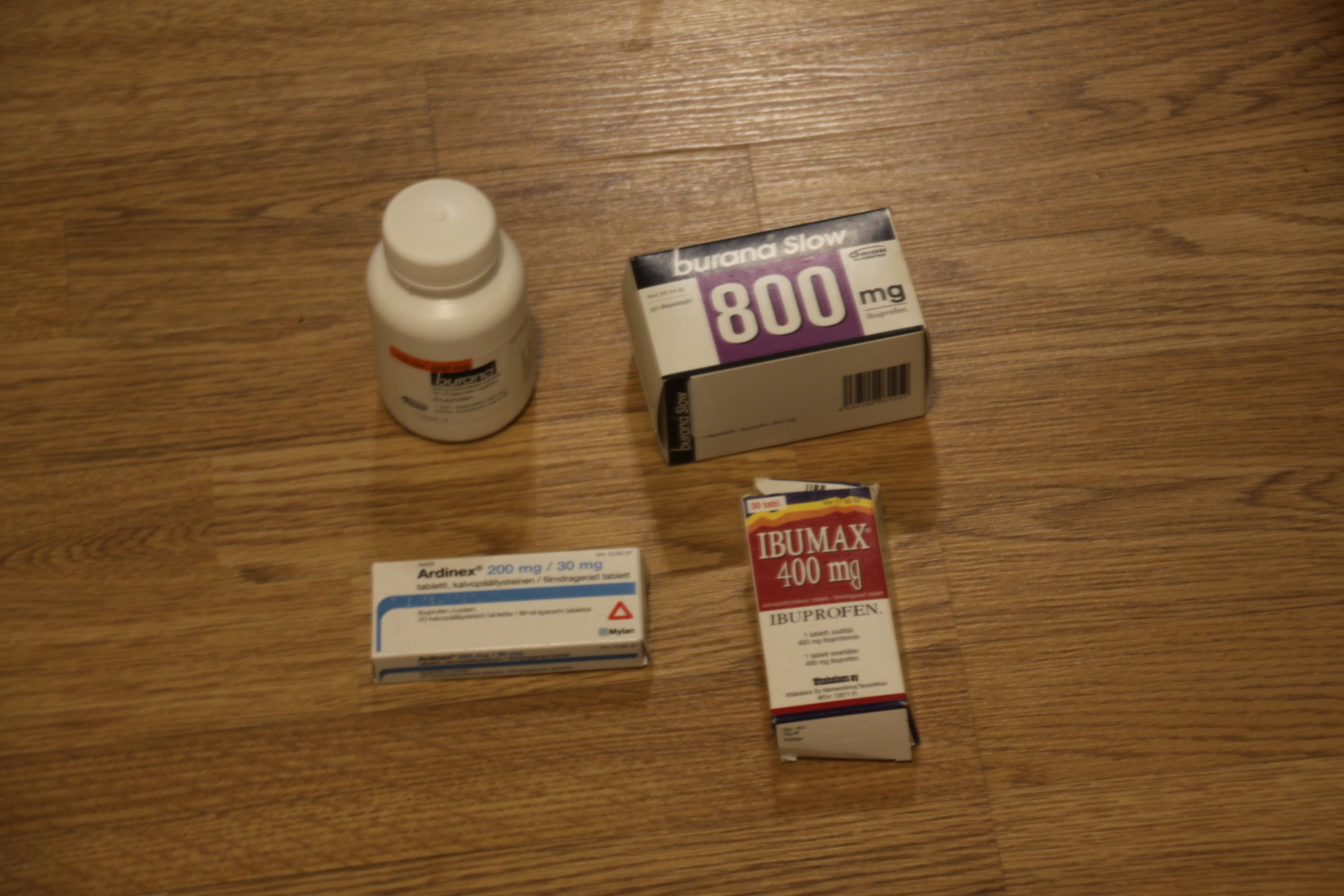
Ibuprofen products sold in Finland

Name	Available forms	Available strengths	Countries
Act-3			
Actiprofen			Canada
Actron			Argentina, Uruguay, Chile
Adagin			Romania
Addaprin			United States
Adex			Israel
Advifen			Uganda, Afghanistan, Iraq
Advil	Tablets, Capsules, Liquid, liquid filled capsules	100 mg, 200 mg	Australia, Brazil, Canada, Colombia, France, Greece, Hungary, Israel, North Macedonia, Mexico, Netherlands, Philippines, South Africa, South Korea, Turkey, United States, Romania
A-G Profen			United States
Aktren			Austria, Germany
Alaxan	Capsule		Philippines
Alges-X			Switzerland
Algifor			Switzerland
Algoflex			Hungary
Algofren			Greece
Alivium			Brazil
Alvofen Express	Capsule	400 mg	Iceland
Arinac			Pakistan
Arthrofen	Tablet	200 mg, 400 mg, 600 mg	United Kingdom
Artofen			Israel
Betagesic			South Africa
Betaprofen			South Africa
Blokmax			North Macedonia, Croatia, Serbia
Bonifen			North Macedonia, Slovenia
Brufen	Tablet, caplet, oral syrup, miscible granules	tablet: 200 mg, 400 mg, 600 mg syrup: 100 mg/5 mL granules: 600 mg/sachet	Austria, Egypt, Greece, India, Italy, New Zealand, Pakistan, Portugal, Saudi Arabia, Serbia, Slovakia, South Africa, South Korea, United Kingdom, Romania
Brufen Retard	Sustained-release film-coated caplet	800 mg	United Kingdom, Poland, Norway
Bufen			United States
Bugesic			Australia
Buplex			Ireland
Buprovil			Brazil
Burana			Finland, Norway
Caldolor			United States
Calprofen	Oral syrup	100 mg/5 mL	United Kingdom
Cap-Profen			United States
Combiflam			India
Dalsy			Bosnia and Herzegovina, Brazil, Croatia, Spain
Dismenol			Austria
Diverin			North Macedonia, Slovenia
Dolgit			Austria, Czech Republic, Germany, Hungary, Slovakia, Turkey
Dolofort			Austria
Doloraz			Jordan
Dolormin			Germany
Dolo-Spedifen			Switzerland
Dorival			
Easofen			Ireland
Ebufac	Tablet	200 mg, 400 mg, 600 mg	United Kingdom
EmuProfen			United States
Espidifen			Spain
Eve			Japan
Faspic	Tablet	200 mg, 400 mg	Philippines
Fenbid	Topical gel	10%	China, United Kingdom
Fenpaed	Oral liquid	20 mg/mL	United Kingdom, New Zealand
Feverfen	Oral liquid	100 mg/5 mL	United Kingdom
Finalflex			Slovenia
Galprofen			United Kingdom
Gelofen			Iran
Genpril			United States
Haltran			United States
Hedafen	Tablet	200 mg	Australia
Hedex			Kenya, Uganda
Herron Blue			Australia
I-Prin			United States
i-profen			New Zealand
Ibalgin			Czech Republic, Slovakia, Romania
Ibetin	Tablets	400 mg	Iceland
Ibrofen			Thailand
Ibu or IBU			Chile, United States
IBUFEN			Israel
Ibugan			Thailand
Ibugel	Topical gel	10%	United Kingdom
Ibuflam	Suspension	2%, 4%	Germany, South Africa
Ibugesic			Latvia
IbuHEXAL			Germany
Ibuleve	Topical gel		Israel, United Kingdom
Ibum			Poland
Ibumax			Finland, South Africa
Ibumetin			Austria, Denmark, Finland, Latvia, Sweden, Norway
Ibumidol			Uruguay
Ibupain			South Africa
Ibupirac			Argentina, Uruguay
Ibuprofen	Tablet, caplet, oral liquid, topical gel	tablet: 200 mg, 400 mg, 600 mg, 800 mg caplet: ? oral liquid: 100 mg/5 mL topical gel: 5%	United Kingdom, Canada, Norway, Romania, United States, Belgium; Netherlands, Czech Republic, Slovakia, Spain, Sweden, Poland
Ibuprofene			Italy
Ibuprohm			United States
Ibuprom			Poland, Italy, Spain, Portugal, Bulgaria, Russia
Ibuprox			Norway
Ibuprosyn			Finland
IBU-Ratiopharm			Germany
Ibustar			Latvia
Ibutabs			Finland, Slovakia
Ibu-Tab			United States
Ibu-Vivimed			Germany
Ibux			Norway
Ibuxin			Finland
Ibuxin Rapid	Tablets	400 mg	Iceland
Inflanor	Suspension	4%	Czech Republic
Ipren			Denmark, Sweden
Irfen			Switzerland
Íbúfen	Tablets	200 mg, 400 mg, 600 mg (Rx only)	Iceland
Kratalgin			Austria
Lotem			South Africa
Medicol			Philippines
Midol	Liquid Gels	200 mg	United States
Moment			Italy
Motrin	tablets, chewable tablets, oral suspension.	50 mg, 100 mg, 200 mg	Canada, North Macedonia, United States
Mypaid			South Africa
Myprodol			South Africa
Narfen			South Korea
Naron Ace			Japan
Neobrufen			Spain
Neofen			Croatia
Neo Rheumacyl Anti-Inflammatory IBP	Topical gel	5%	Indonesia
Neupren	Tablet	200 mg, 400 mg, 600 mg	Algeria
Norvectan			Spain
Nuprin			Canada, United States
Nureflex			Austria
Nurofen	Tablet, caplet, oral liquid, topical gel	tablet: 200 mg oral liquid: 100 mg/5 mL	Australia, Austria, Belgium, Bulgaria, Croatia, Cyprus, Czech Republic, France, Germany, Greece, Hungary, Ireland, Israel, Italy, North Macedonia, Netherlands, New Zealand, Poland, Portugal, Romania, Russia, Serbia, Slovakia, South Africa, Spain, Switzerland, Turkey, United Kingdom
Orbifen	Oral liquid	100 mg/5 mL	United Kingdom
Paduden			Romania
Panafen			Australia
Paraped Plus			India
Perifar			Uruguay
Profin			Iraq
Proprinal			United States
Proris	Oral liquid, tablet, suppositoria		Indonesia
Q-Profen			United States
Ranfen			South Africa
Rapidol			Croatia
Ratiodolor			Austria
Rimafen	Tablet	200 mg, 400 mg, 600 mg	United Kingdom
Salvarina			Spain
sapofen	tablets, oral suspension	400 mg, 600 mg, 100 mg/5 mL	Kingdom of Saudi Arabia
Sarixell			Netherlands
Solpaflex			Slovenia
Spedifen			France, Indonesia
Speedpain NANO			South Korea
Spidifen			Belgium, Portugal
Tefin			Ireland
Unafen			India
Upfen			North Macedonia
Xydol	Tablet	200 mg, 400 mg, 600 mg	Algeria
