= Bart Becht =

Dutch businessman

Lambertus Johannes Hermanus "Bart" Becht (born 29 July 1956) is a Dutch businessman. An executive with more than 35 years of business experience working with consumer brands, Becht is the former Chief Executive Officer of Reckitt, which he led from 1995 to 2011 and former Partner at JAB Holding Company, which he joined in 2012. Becht announced his retirement from JAB in 2019.

Through his role at JAB, Becht serves on the board of directors of several public companies, including Keurig Dr Pepper and Coty.

== Early life ==
Becht received a Bachelor of Arts degree in economics at the University of Groningen, The Netherlands, and received an MBA from the University of Chicago, Booth School of Business.

== Career ==
=== Reckitt Benckiser ===
Becht joined the Benckiser side of the business in 1988, following a career at Procter & Gamble, and was named CEO of Benckiser's Household Products Division in 1995. While Becht was CEO, Benckiser went public via an IPO in 1997 and merged with Reckitt & Coleman in 1999.

While Becht led Reckitt Benckiser, he helped orchestrate the company's acquisitions of Boots Health Care International, Adams Therapeutics and SSL International.

During his tenure at Reckitt, Becht oversaw a fivefold increase in the company's market value and over the 10 years to 2010, the company was the fourth best performing stock in the FTSE 100.

He retired as CEO of Reckitt Benckiser on 31 August 2011, and was succeeded by Rakesh Kapoor.

=== JAB ===
Following his retirement from Reckitt, Becht joined as a Partner the Luxembourg-based JAB Holdings Co., which invests in companies with premium brands in the consumer goods category. As of June 2018, JAB had over $80 billion in assets under management.

During Becht's time at JAB, the firm has acquired stakes in several food and beverage brands, such as Peet's Coffee, Jacobs Douwe Egberts, Keurig Green Mountain, Dr. Pepper, Panera Bread, Pret A Manger and Krispy Kreme, among others.

=== Other Boards and Councils ===
Other private company directorships have included: Jacobs Douwe Egberts, Caribou Coffee/Einstein, Pret A Manger, Krispy Kreme and Panera Bread.

== Personal life ==
Becht, who is married and has three children, in 2006 founded the Becht Family Charitable Trust, which supports humanitarian organizations such as Save the Children as well as educational and environmental causes. He was ranked second on the Sunday Times ‘Giving List’ in 2011 and served on the Board of Directors of nonprofit Save the Children UK from 2013 to 2014.
