= Brian Niccol =

American businessperson (born 1974)

Brian R. Niccol
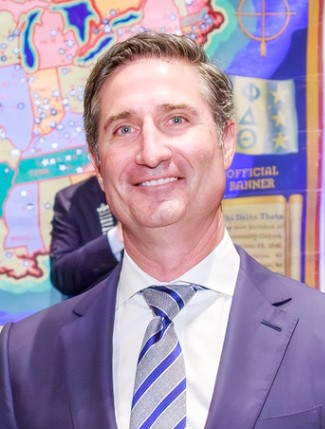
- Niccol in 2023
- Born: 1974 (age 51–52)
- Education: Miami University (BA); University of Chicago (MBA)
- Occupation: CEO of Starbucks

Brian R. Niccol (born 1974) is an American businessman and the chairman and chief executive officer of Starbucks, a role which he started on September 9, 2024, replacing Laxman Narasimhan. He previously was chairman and CEO of Chipotle until August 31, 2024.

== Early life and education ==
Niccol is a native of Philadelphia. He went to Miami University to study engineering. However, a marketing class piqued his interest, causing him to take several elective courses in business. Niccol is a member of Phi Delta Theta fraternity. Niccol graduated from Miami University in 1996. He also received an MBA from the University of Chicago's Booth School of Business in 2003.

== Career ==
=== Procter & Gamble, Pizza Hut (1995–2011) ===
In 1995, Niccol got a college internship at Procter & Gamble. After graduation, he started his career in brand management at that company. At P&G, he spent two years as a brand manager for ThermaCare, then moved to represent Pringles in December 2002.

In 2005, Niccol moved into the restaurant industry by joining Yum! Brands as a vice-president of strategic marketing. He led a research study that identified fathers as important customer segments, helping to increase sales at Yum's Pizza Hut brand and improving the chain's market share by an additional point. Two years later, he was appointed the chief marketing officer (CMO) of Pizza Hut.

One of Niccol's primary challenges at Pizza Hut was helping the restaurant chain navigate the Great Recession. Throughout his tenure, Niccol introduced initiatives to help Pizza Hut's digital marketing. In January 2008, the pizza chain introduced the option for customers to use their mobile phone to place orders via text message or through their website. A year later, Pizza Hut released a mobile app on the iPhone, enabling customers to make meal orders remotely. After just two weeks, the app was downloaded 100,000 times from the App Store, and within three months generated $1 million in sales. Pizza Hut announced in October 2010 that they would be partnering with Foursquare to reward loyal customers with free breadsticks.

Less successfully, Pizza Hut briefly experimented with a new logo simply called "The Hut" throughout the first half of 2009. This was eventually retracted after poor public reception. Niccol said that the truncated name "ties in nicely with [today's] texting generation", explaining that the company wanted to make the phrase "common vernacular" for Pizza Hut.

=== Taco Bell (2011–2018) ===
In October 2011, Taco Bell named Niccol their new chief marketing and innovation officer. Niccol joined Taco Bell during a time when sales had stagnated. The brand had spent millions of dollars to fight a class action lawsuit regarding the quality of its beef. While the lawsuit was dismissed, Taco Bell sales dropped 5% in Q2 2011, which the company attributed to damaged consumer perceptions of its food. In January 2012, the brand introduced a breakfast menu, as well as a more upscale "Cantina Bell" menu to compete against fast-casual restaurants like Chipotle Mexican Grill. These plans helped reverse Taco Bell's fortunes, with the company posting an 8% increase in fiscal year 2012.

On January 1, 2015, Niccol was promoted to chief executive officer (CEO) of Taco Bell. He presented an ongoing plan for Taco Bell to be appealing to Millennials and future generations. Niccol led a successful turnaround effort at Taco Bell as CEO.

=== Chipotle Mexican Grill (2018–2024) ===
In March 2018, Niccol became the CEO of Chipotle Mexican Grill, replacing founder Steve Ells. Prior to Niccol's arrival, Chipotle had been facing a string of food safety issues beginning in 2015 that had damaged customer trust. The restaurant chain had also tried introducing new items like a queso to mixed reception. In June 2018, Chipotle announced that they were closing up to 65 locations that year. However, Chipotle faced another food safety setback when an outbreak of Clostridium perfringens at a location in Ohio made over 600 people sick in July 2018. In response, Niccol introduced a marketing campaign in September of that year aimed at reminding customers of the restaurant's fresh ingredients and preparation. He credited the advertisements for helping to improve sales.

Although Niccol had moved west to Newport Beach, California to join Taco Bell, he did not move back east to Denver when he joined Chipotle. Rather, under his leadership, Chipotle moved its headquarters from Denver to Newport Beach. During his tenure, he helped double Chipotle's revenue while its profits increased almost seven times. The stock price of Chipotle has increased by almost eight times under Niccol. Niccol also increased salaries for Chipotle's retail staff and expanded employee benefits.

In 2023, Niccol's total compensation at Chipotle was $22.5 million.

=== Starbucks (2024–) ===
On August 13, 2024, Niccol was named the incoming chairman and chief executive officer of Starbucks. Niccol replaced Mellody Hobson as the chairman and Laxman Narasimhan as the CEO. On the day of the announcement, shares of Starbucks gained 24.5%. Niccol received a starting salary of $1.6 million and a $10 million starting bonus, with an additional $75 million in equity grants designed to pay out over time and an annual cash incentive opportunity at a target of 225 percent of his base salary. Overall Niccol received $97.8 million in total compensation in 2024, equivalent to 6,666 times the median employee pay at Starbucks for that year.

At the outset of his tenure as CEO, Niccol developed and started implementing a "Back to Starbucks" plan. This included the potential for a doubling of Starbucks's store count in the US. In the fiscal second quarter Starbucks's operating margin fell to 6.9% from 12.8% as expenditure swelled on the turnaround plan. Niccol refused to move the company's headquarters from Starbucks Center in Seattle to a location closer to his residence in Orange County, California. This was disappointing for Starbucks investors who had hoped that a move would revitalize the company by enabling it to draw upon the much larger Southern California talent market for its headquarters staff, as had occurred at Chipotle.

The ongoing 2025 Starbucks workers' strike started under Niccol's tenure as CEO, amid accusations of unfair labor practices and stalling contract negotiations.

== Boards ==
Niccol currently sits on the boards of directors of Starbucks and Walmart. He was previously a member of the Chipotle Mexican Grill, KB Home, and Harley-Davidson boards of directors. He also previously sat as a member of the Board of Governors for the Boys & Girls Clubs of America.

== Recognitions ==
Niccol was on Bloomberg's The Bloomberg 50 and Fortune's Businessperson of the Year, both in 2019. He was also on the University of Chicago Booth School of Business's Distinguished Alumni list in 2020 and EatingWell's American Food Heroes list in 2021.

== Controversies ==
Under Niccol's leadership, Chipotle closed a store in Augusta, Maine in 2022 after employees there tried to make it the company's first unionized location. The workers filed a complaint at the National Labor Relations Board (NLRB), which ruled that the closure was an illegal act of union-busting.

In 2024, as the newly appointed CEO of Starbucks, Niccol was reported to be using the company-owned jet to commute roughly 1,000 miles from his residence in Newport Beach to Starbucks Center in Seattle where he was expected to work in person at least three times a week, while at the time cutting commuting benefits for store employees. This sparked criticism by environmentalists concerned about greenhouse gas emissions and other harmful environmental impacts.

== Personal life ==
Niccol lives in Newport Beach, California with his wife Jennifer and three children.
