= Stain =

Discoloration that can be clearly distinguished from the surface

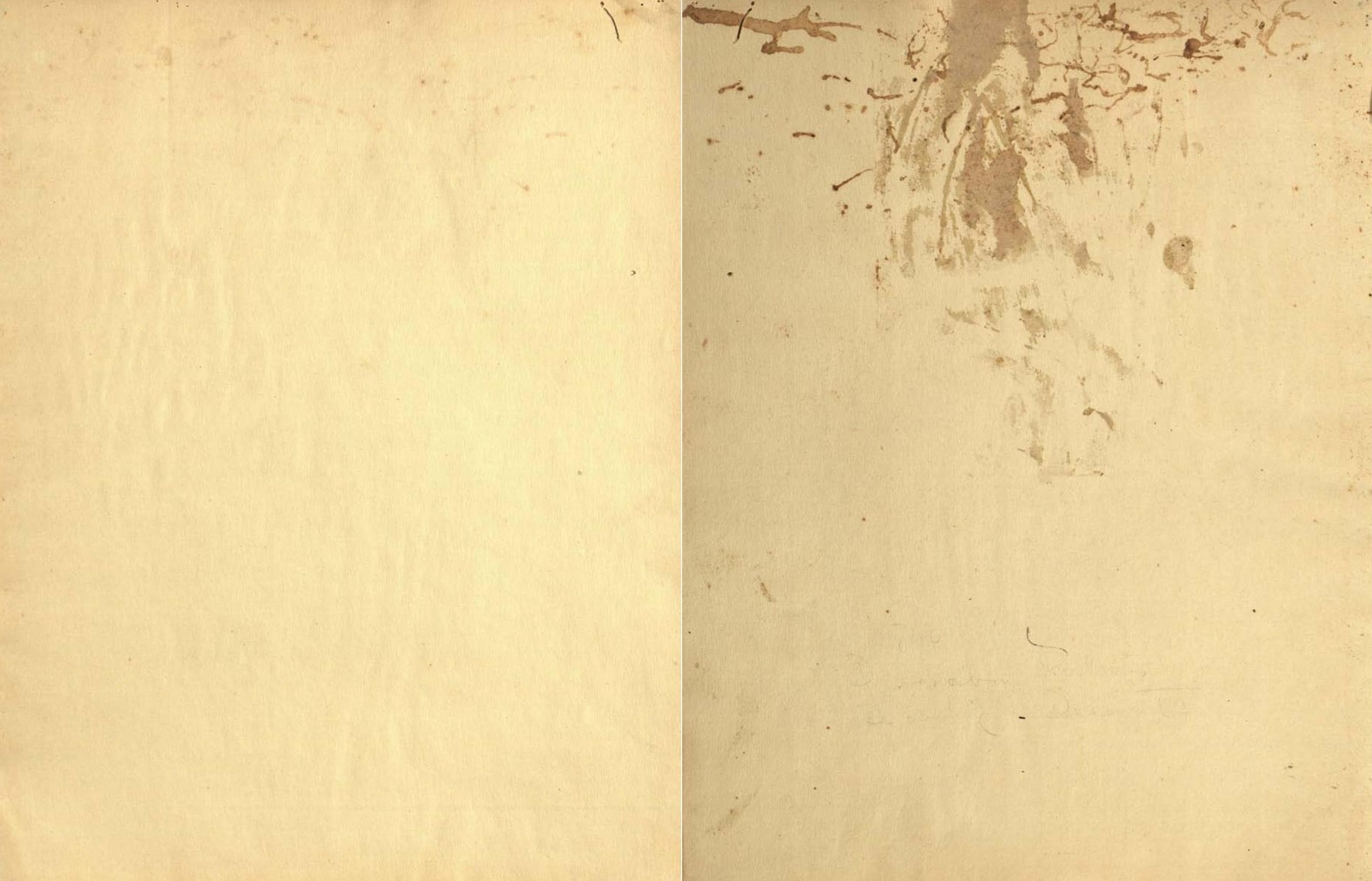
From a copy of "Decorative Patterns of the Ancient world," by Sir Flinders Petrie.

A stain is a discoloration that can be clearly distinguished from the surface, material, or medium it is found upon. They are caused by the chemical or physical interaction of two dissimilar materials. Accidental staining may make materials appear used, degraded or permanently unclean. Intentional staining is used in biochemical research, and for artistic effect, such as in wood staining, rust staining and stained glass.

== Types ==
There can be intentional stains (such as wood stains or paint), indicative stains (such as food coloring dye), and staining, the use of one or more substances to enhance the visibility of samples in a microscope or other imaging device. Numerous naturally occurring stains exist, such as rust on iron and a patina on bronze, as do accidental stains such as from ketchup and oil on fabrics and other materials.

Different types of material can be stained by different substances, and stain resistance is an important characteristic in modern textile engineering.

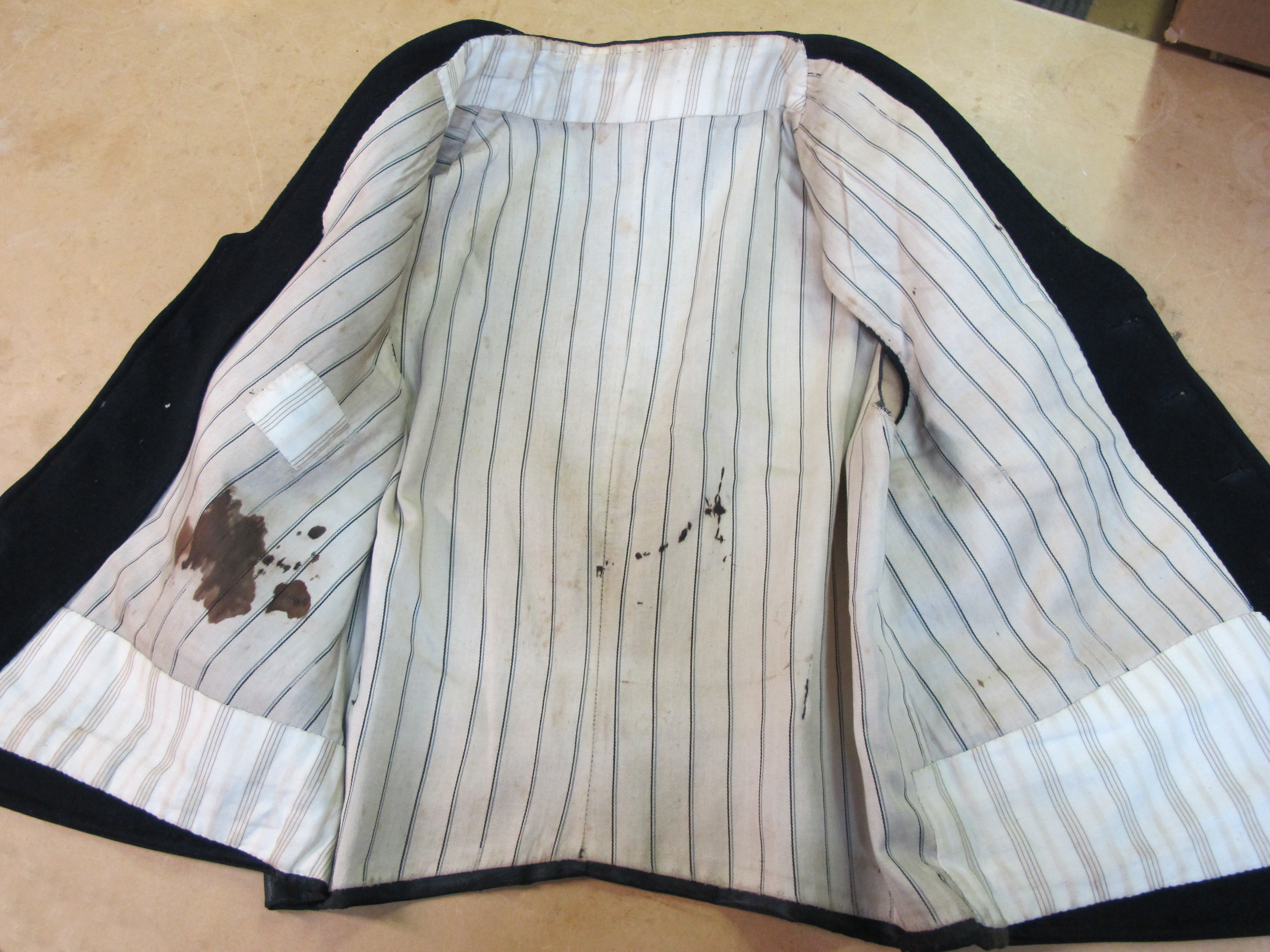
Stained waistcoat, originally that of a Royal Navy captain of the Victorian era

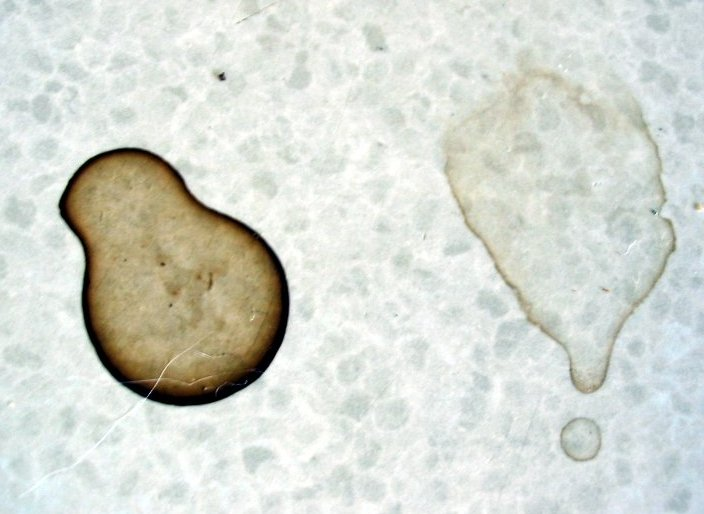
Coffee stains

== Formation ==
The primary method of stain formation is surface stains, where the staining substance is spilled onto the surface or material and is trapped in the fibers, pores, indentations, or other capillary structures on the surface. The material that is trapped coats the underlying material, and the stain reflects backlight according to its own color. Applied paint, spilled food, and wood stains are of this nature.

A secondary method of stain involves a chemical or molecular reaction between the material and the staining material. Many types of natural stains fall into this category.

Finally, there can also be molecular attraction between the material and the staining material, involving being held in a covalent bond and showing the color of the bound substance.

== Properties ==
In many cases, stains are affected by heat and may become reactive enough to bond with the underlying material. Applied heat, such as from ironing, dry cleaning, or sunlight, can cause a chemical reaction on an otherwise removable stain.

== Removal ==
Various laundry techniques exist to attempt to remove or reduce existing stains. Stain removal is frequently a highly desired characteristic in laundry detergents and other types of cleaning products. Some products are designed to be applied directly onto stains. The removal of some types of stains requires chemicals or special techniques.

Some techniques for wood stain removal, involve first removing the protective layer (for example varnish) if there is one, before sanding and refinishing.

There are different techniques for removing rust stains, depending on the material this is on, for example clothing or concrete. Some housekeeping guides recommend using salt and lemon juice on clothing and specialist cleaners to remove rust from concrete, on areas such as driveways and patios.

== See also ==
- Biodegradation
- Bleach
- Dye
- Foxing
- Permanent marker
- Weathering steel
