= Nurofen =

Drug brand name

- Founded: 1983
- Area served: Worldwide
- Services: Medication
- Owner: Reckitt Benckiser
- Parent: Reckitt Benckiser
- Website: nurofen.com

Nurofen is a brand of range of pain-relief medication containing ibuprofen made by the English-Dutch company Reckitt Benckiser. Introduced in 1983, the Nurofen brand was acquired following Reckitt Benckiser's acquisition of Boots healthcare international in 2005 for £1.93 billion, which included Nurofen, Strepsils, and Clearasil. The brand is primarily marketed and sold in the United Kingdom, other parts of Europe, South Africa, Australia and New Zealand. In 2016, it was the biggest selling branded over-the-counter medication sold in Great Britain, with sales of £116.8 million.

== Variants ==
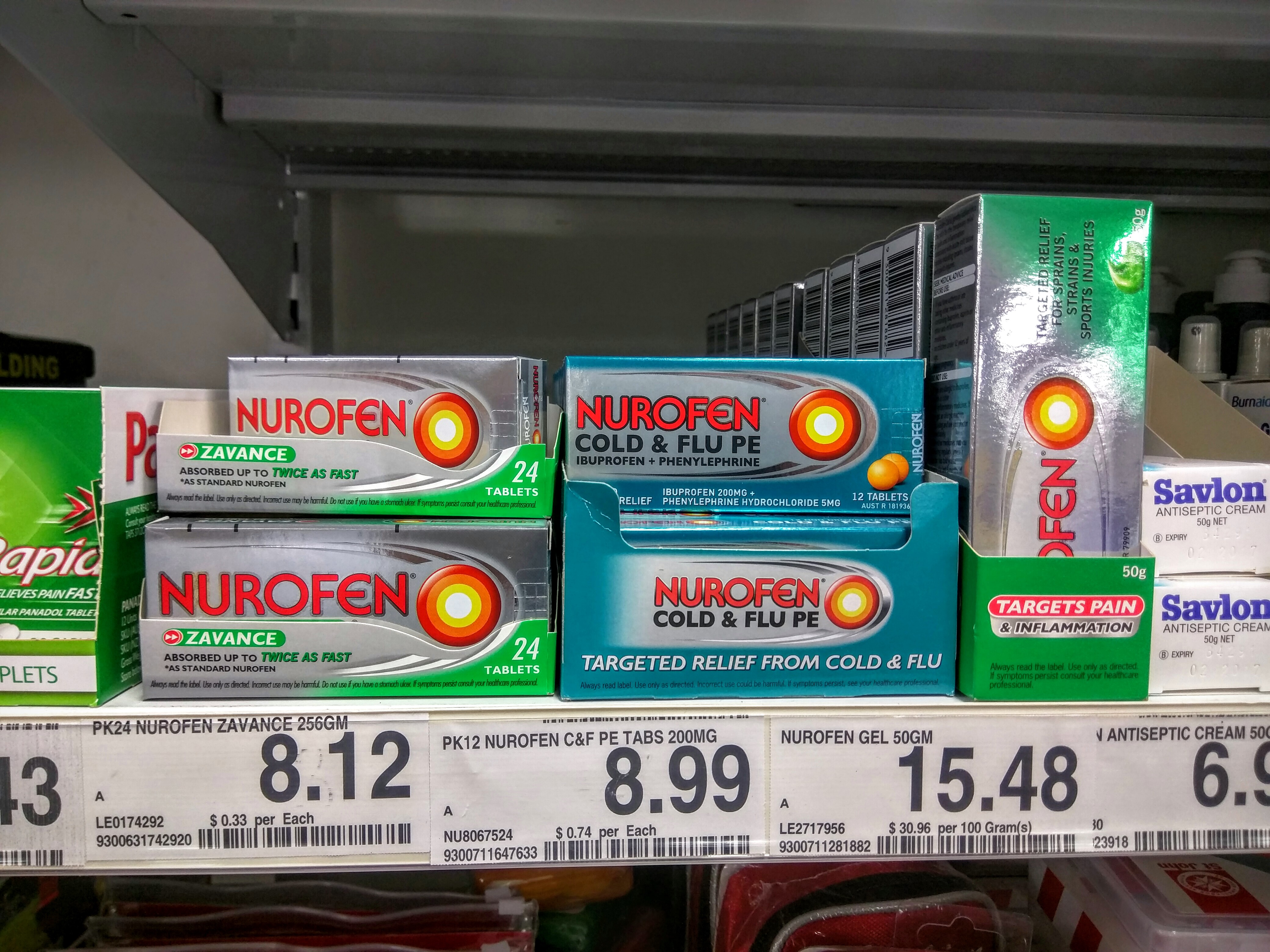
Boxes of Nurofen on a pharmacy shelf

There are 11 variants of Nurofen, all of which contain ibuprofen as an active ingredient. The ibuprofen is variously formulated as the free acid, or the lysine salt. For oral formulations, i.e., taken by mouth, it is available in the conventional solid round tablet, a torpedo-shaped solid caplet, or may alternatively be in the form of a soft gel cap. It is also available as a topical gel, which is applied directly to the surface of the skin. In some cases these are marketed as being useful for treating specific types of pain; such as back pain or period pain. The primary difference among the various formulations is speed and duration of ibuprofen absorption. According to the UK Medicines and Healthcare products Regulatory Agency (UK MHRA), the form of ibuprofen in 'Nurofen Tension Headache' (ibuprofen lysine) is absorbed nearly twice as fast as the form in 'Nurofen Period Pain' (ibuprofen free acid), with the former reaching peak blood concentrations in 38 minutes, compared to 80 minutes for the latter.

Some variants of Nurofen contain additional active ingredients; for example, 'Nurofen Cold & Flu' contains the non-sedating decongestant pseudoephedrine.

=== Nurofen Plus ===
Nurofen Plus is a pain relief medication based on codeine and ibuprofen. It contains 12.8 mg of codeine phosphate (a mild opioid analgesic) and 200 mg of ibuprofen, which is an NSAID. Nurofen Plus is the only product in the Nurofen range that contains codeine.

The original Nurofen Plus tablet was manufactured in two equal parts, joined, and then coated. One part contained 12.8 mg of codeine phosphate, and the other part contained 200 mg of ibuprofen. The tablets could be forcefully split into their two constituent active ingredients, thus isolating the codeine for recreational use. Such drugs have a potential for misuse because they are available freely to the public.

== 2011 product recall ==
On 25 August 2011, it was reported that several packs of Nurofen Plus were found to contain Seroquel XR — an anti-psychotic drug used to treat schizophrenia — in Boots stores across London. The next day, a safety alert was issued by the Medicines and Healthcare products Regulatory Agency (MHRA). Pharmacists were told to check each package of Nurofen Plus to look for anti-psychotic drugs. Three batches of Nurofen Plus were affected by the alert. Reckitt Benckiser, manufacturer of Nurofen Plus, said that it did not know where the drugs had been switched. The product was re-released in October in cellophane-sealed packs.

== Misleading advertising ==
=== Australia ===
In 2010, the Australian consumer advocate Choice awarded Nurofen a "Shonky award" for charging more for "targeted" products, all of which had the same active ingredient as the base product.

In 2012, the Australian Therapeutic Goods Administration upheld a complaint that Nurofen's advertising of different products for different pain was "misleading or likely to be misleading", and ordered that "any representation that refers to two or more Nurofen products that contain equivalent quantities of ibuprofen and include the same product specific indications on the Australian Register of Therapeutic Goods must clearly indicate, in the body of the advertisement, that the two products can be used for the same purposes and are interchangeable (or words to that effect)".

In April 2013, the Australian consumer affairs television programme The Checkout ran a story about Nurofen's claims about targeting specific pain. Edelman, the PR company for Reckitt Benckiser provided a statement, some of which was used in the programme. Included in the information provided by Edelman were photocopies of some 'sciencey looking documents' that confirmed that Ibuprofen was 'Non-selective'.

In March 2015, the Australian Competition & Consumer Commission (ACCC) launched proceedings against Reckitt Benckiser; for misleading advertising for its targeted pain range. In December 2015, the Federal Court of Australia found that Reckitt Benckiser, which makes Nurofen, had misled consumers with its "Nurofen Specific pain range", and ordered that all Nurofen specific pain products be removed from retail sale within three months. A spokeswoman for Reckitt Benckiser argued that, "[This] specific-pain range" was intended "to help consumers navigate their pain relief options, particularly within the grocery environment where there is no healthcare professional to assist decision making". The ACCC said that the products were found to be "no more effective at treating the type of pain described on its packaging than any of the other Nurofen specific pain products", and sold for almost twice the price. Specific pain range painkillers include Nurofen Back Pain, Nurofen Period Pain, Nurofen Migraine Pain and Nurofen Tension; and all contain the "same active ingredient, 342 milligrams of ibuprofen lysine".

In April 2016, the Federal Court imposed a $1.7 million fine on Reckitt Benckiser. The ACCC appealed the decision in May arguing that $1.7 million in penalties did not act as an adequate deterrent for a company the size of Reckitt Benckiser. In December 2016, the Federal Court increased the fine to $6 million, the highest corporate penalty ever awarded for misleading conduct under the Australian Consumer Law.

=== United Kingdom ===
Following the 2015 Australian decision, the UK Advertising Standards Authority (ASA) said that it was investigating earlier complaints about a television advertisement for Nurofen Express, which was alleged to be misleading, as it implied that the medicine targeted muscles in the head.
