= British Generic Manufacturers Association =

British trade association

Medicines UK is the trading name of the British Generic Manufacturers Association (BGMA) a trade association for the British generic and biosimilar drug industry.

Mark Samuels is the Chief Executive of the association and also of the British Biosimilars Association. The current Chair is Paul Burden of Accord Healthcare and Diane DiGangi Trench, head of Sandoz UK is the vice chair.

The association has nearly 50 members and represents the manufacturers and suppliers of nine out of 10 NHS medicines.

In 2023, ahead of the UK General Election, the association published its Manifesto outlining the key policy priorities for whichever party was to form the next Government.

In 2017, it said it was working with the Department of Health and Social Care to deal with problems caused by generic drug shortages, to address price gauging through a "Health Services Medical Supplies Bill". It explained that some generic drugs were produced by only one supplier "because the total market size is too small to be attractive for generic companies to enter, since they would not recoup the million-pound plus costs of developing, testing and registering a new generic medicine". This has been countered by Andrew Hill from the department of pharmacology and therapeutics at the University of Liverpool.

In June 2019 it reported that the NHS was, on average, paying 193% of the manufacturers' selling price for Category M products, more than 500 medicines which are readily available with wholesalers receiving half of the profit and pharmacies receiving the other half.

In 2022 it called for branded generics and biosimilars to be exempted from the Voluntary Scheme for Branded Medicines Pricing and Access that was introduced in 2019 because the rising rebate rate “is forcing manufacturers to shun the UK market, further reducing price competition”. This is based on a new analysis conducted by the Office of Health Economics.

In 2025 the BGMA started trading as Medicines UK.
