= Green company =

Acts, or claims to act, in a way which minimizes damage to the environment

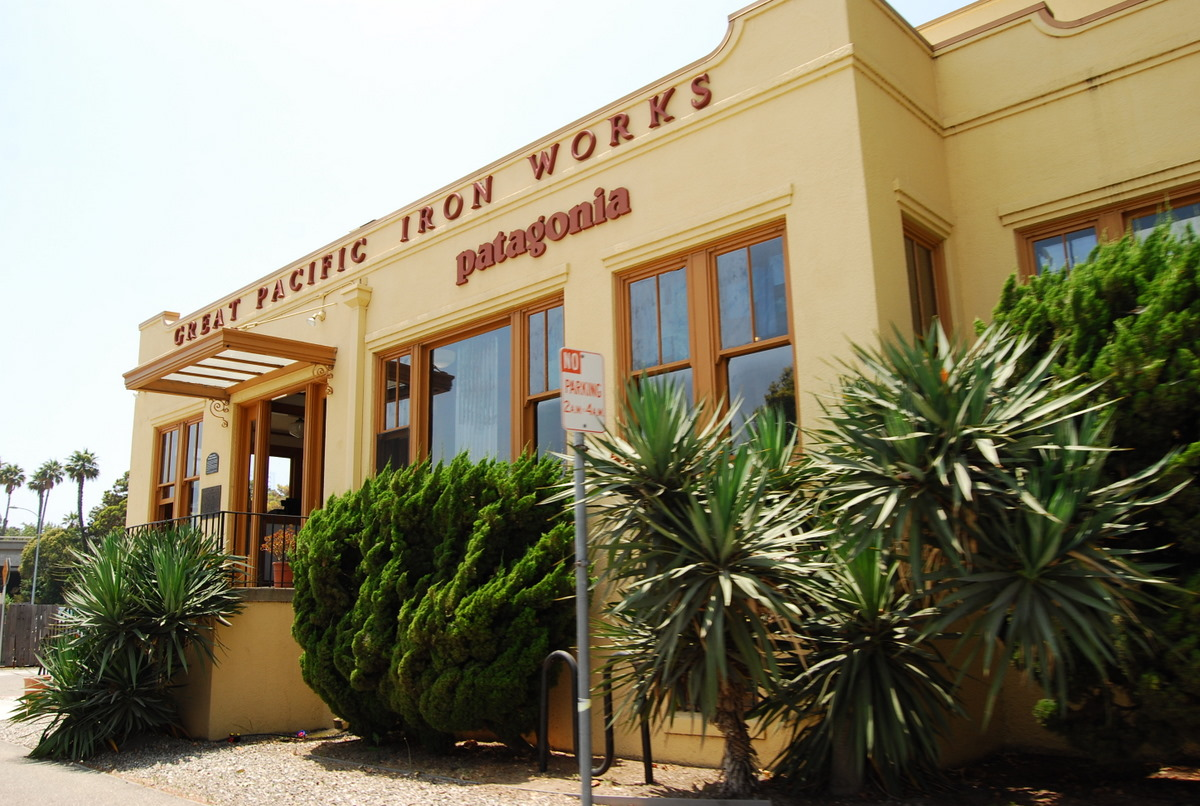
Patagonia headquarters in Ventura, California. Patagonia is a clothing and outdoors brand known for its climate activism and initiative.

A green company, also known as an environmentally friendly or sustainable business, is an organization that conducts itself in a way that minimizes harm to the environment. Examples of these actions may include the conservation of natural resources, efforts to reduce carbon emissions, a reduction of waste creation, and support of ecological conservation. Green companies often implement environmentally responsible practices across their entire value chain, from sourcing raw materials to manufacturing processes and distribution.

Green companies aim to contribute to the preservation of the environment and address the challenges posed by climate change. This commitment to environmental stewardship is increasingly important in the context of growing concerns about global warming and the broader environmental impact of human activities.

Green companies and businesses that partake in sustainable practices often receive criticism and face scrutiny for being accused of greenwashing and manipulative marketing. The use of what "green" methods and practices are is often hyperbolized when utilized in advertising, and has led to controversy across industries on whether a practice, product, initiative, or other action is one that is sustainable enough to constitute being green.

== Characteristics ==
Green companies have traits that are common among sustainable businesses.

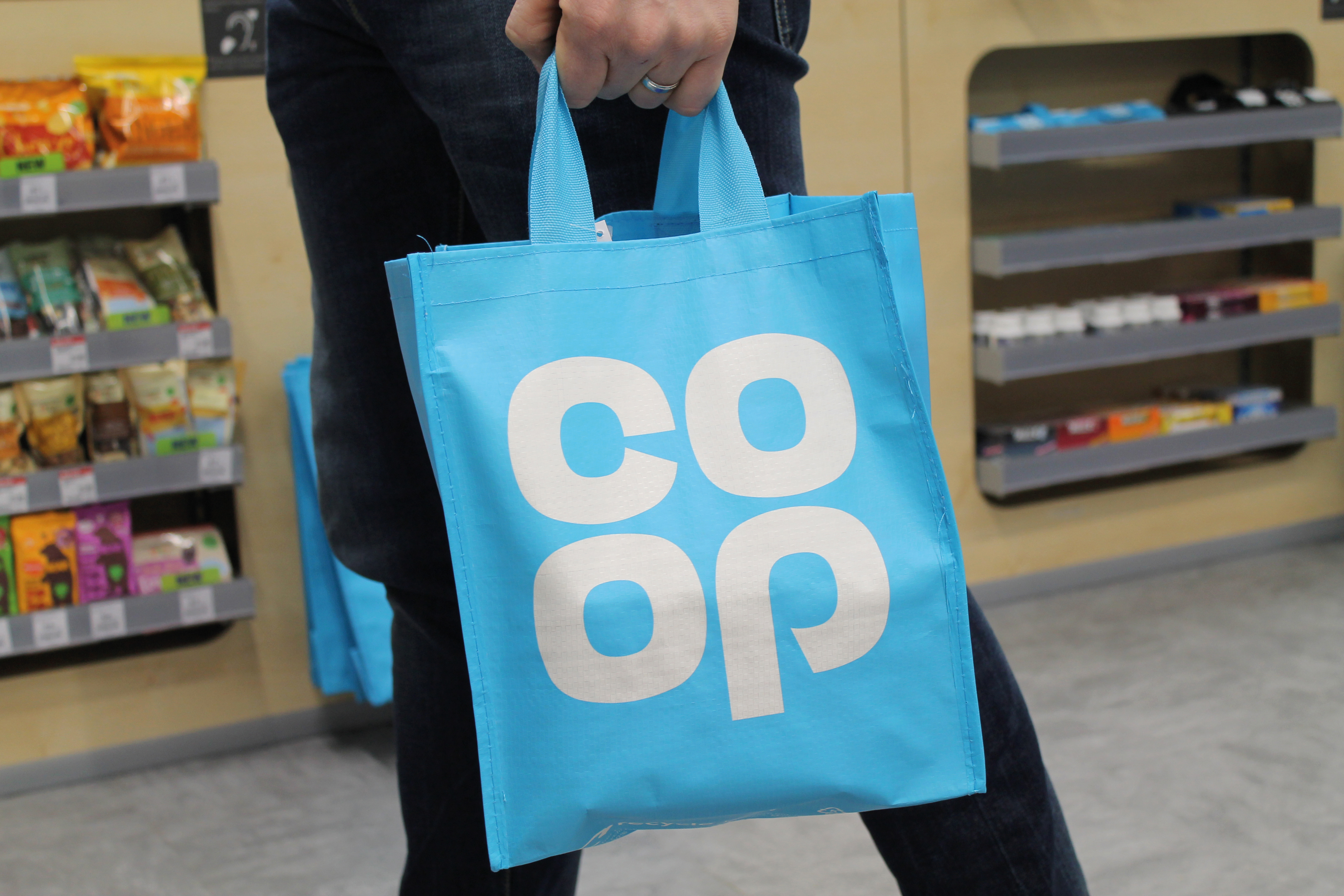
A reusable bag from a food cooperative is a common example of a sustainable practice a green company may partake in.

Some of the notable practices of a green company are:

- An emphasis on their sustainable and environmentally conscious practices.
- Support of conservation and environmental protection.
- Use of renewable methods in their business, ranging from energy to packaging.
- Community engagement in local environmental and social issues.
- A commitment to reduction of energy and material consumption.
- Use of alternative, multi-use materials.

A common theme amongst green companies is green marketing. Green companies will utilize this form of advertising to draw in consumers who care about environmental practices. This strategy is used outside of green companies, often being labeled as greenwashing. The line between these practices can at times be thin, and green companies have had controversies on the use of greenwashing, and the efficacy of their sustainability.

== Controversy ==
Supporters of green companies claim that it is far more economical to go green than it is to continue adding harmful chemicals to the atmosphere and the environment in general. Companies that have attempted to become green businesses have often faced significant scrutiny and backlash.

In 2013, The Coca-Cola Company was accused of greenwashing, after marketing a new line of plastic bottles. These ads utilized natural colors and scenes, with a Coca-Cola bottle emerging from leaves in place of a flower. It is alleged that these ads used natural themes to subtly imply a more environmentally conscious packaging. However, said bottles were the same as before.

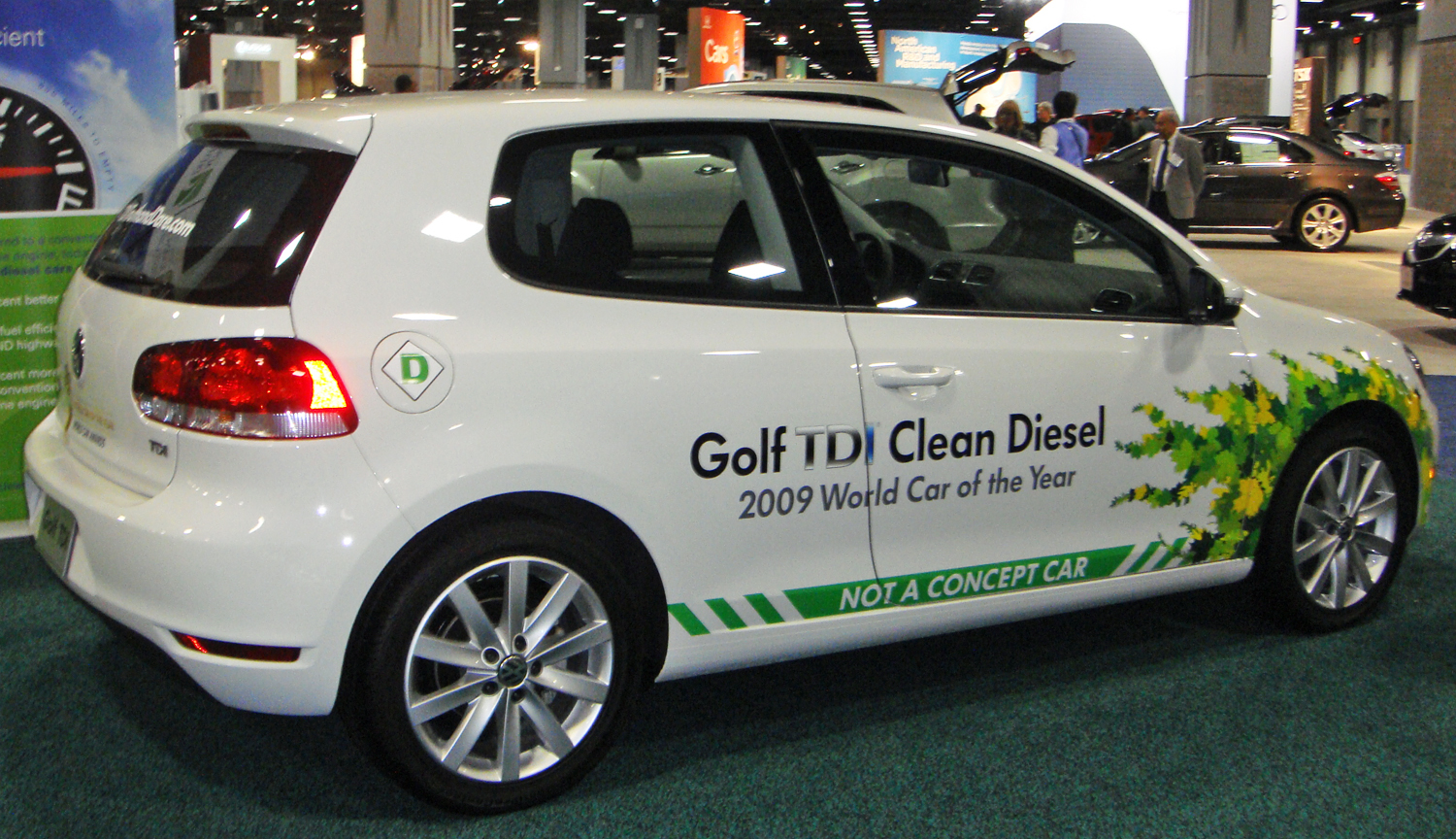
A Volkswagen "Golf" from 2010, being advertised as "Clean Diesel".

In 2015, the car company Volkswagen, VW, was caught in a large scandal, dubbed by the public as Dieselgate. As an effort to enter American car markets, Volkswagen marketed their new diesel vehicles as "sustainable" through their "Think Blue" campaign. This advertising campaign pitched their diesel technology as, "...being more responsible on the road and more environmentally conscious...". Despite presale testing supporting these claims, independent studies found this to be opposite of the truth. VW had installed "defeat devices" in their diesel vehicles, which were used to cheat emissions tests. These devices were used during emissions testing, and worked by feigning the actual amount emissions in order to pass the test. During normal driving conditions, the emissions were much higher, up to 40 times higher, than allowed by environmental regulations through the Environmental Protection Agency (EPA). This scandal resulted in significant environmental and financial repercussions for the auto company. It led to large recalls of their vehicles, legal battles, and billions of dollars in settlements and financial compensation. The company's reputation was severely damaged, and several high-level executives resigned as a result.

== Related terms ==
A "circular economy" is an economic model that is focused on the reduction of waste and consumption within a capitalist system. This is often accomplished through the continual reuse and recycling of materials within an economic system, which leads to less environmental impacts and waste production.

The "Corporate Social Responsibility", CSR, is a business model which is reliant on social accountability from stakeholders, employees, and the general public. This is a business model common within companies that value sustainable practices.

"Greenwashing" is a practice of using marketing and advertising strategies to portray a product or business as more environmentally conscious than in actuality. Opponents believe that the environmental claims of "green companies" are often exaggerated and have variously raised accusations of consumer manipulation.

"Greenscamming" is a company or product that falsely profits under the guise of being environmentally friendly. This can include falsely claiming environmentally friendly credentials, exaggerating the benefits of products on an environment, engaging in greenwashing, the use of misleading imagery or messaging, or the exploitation of consumer interest in environmentally friendly products without genuine commitment to sustainability.

== Examples ==
=== Automotive ===
- A number of major auto companies have developed alternative fuel vehicles and all-electric vehicles in a move to reduce petroleum consumption. Technologies include compressed natural gas, Fuel cell vehicles, Battery electric vehicles, and Hybrid electric vehicles.

=== Aviation ===
- The environmental impact of aviation is significant, though a number of companies are working on mitigation of aviation's environmental impact through new technologies including aviation biofuel.

=== Doors and garage doors ===
- Pella, Masonite, Marvin, Jeld-Wen and other top door manufacturers claim that their entry doors meet Energy Star requirements. Entry doors represent an important source of energy waste in buildings. Ultimately, doors are an important cause of carbon emissions (buildings account for about 41% of our primary energy consumption and an almost equivalent amount of CO_{2} emissions).

=== Fashion ===
- Patagonia Inc, is a fashion and outdoor company that supports and follows many sustainable practices. The company has taken steps to produce eco-friendly products, and provides donations to several environmental efforts. Patagonia engaged in eco-friendly practices for decades that it did not market or advertise until the later half of 2010s. They have since increased their marketing and goals.

=== Petroleum ===
- Suncor, a Canadian-based oil company, was named a top performer among 23 global petroleum-producing firms with its environmentally responsible greenhouse gas management programs.

=== Household ===
- Seventh Generation, a personal care and cleaning company has been valued with sustainable practices since its founding in 1988. The company is responsible for creating plant-based alternatives for other products in the industry. In addition, they are very upfront about their formulas and material use.
- The S.C. Johnson Company, maker of household items such as Windex and Ziploc plastic bags was environmentally aware long before it became popular to be so. Using its innovative "Greenlist" process which serves to evaluate what environmental impact certain raw materials used in producing its products can have, S.C. Johnson has been able to eliminate some 1.8 million pounds of volatile organic compounds and 4 million pounds of polyvinylidene chloride from commonly used household items.

=== Small-business partnerships ===
- In 2009, Atlanta's Virginia-Highland became the first carbon-neutral zone in the United States. This partnership, developed by Verus Carbon Neutral, links 17 merchants of the historic Corner Virginia-Highland shopping and dining neighborhood retail district, through the Chicago Climate Exchange, to directly fund the Valley Wood Carbon Sequestration Project (thousands of acres of forest in rural Georgia).

== See also ==
- Corporate social responsibility

== Sources ==
- CNNMoney.com
- Green Companies
- Green Company Directory
