= Texize =

American chemical company

Texize Chemical Company or simply Texize, is a chemical company incorporated in 1945 which sold industrial cleaners to textile mills, hence the name "Texize." It was also one of the first accounts of Henderson Advertising Agency, founded by James M. Henderson in 1946 in Greenville, South Carolina. It was Henderson who persuaded Texize's founder, W. J. "Jack" Greer, to market the company's products for household use. Texize's product line included Janitor In a Drum, Glass Plus, Fantastik, Spray 'N Wash, Vivid color safe bleach and many others. Its consumer line was acquired by Dow Chemical Company in 1986; Texize still markets to industrial clients. SC Johnson later bought some of these brands from Dow, and Reckitt Benckiser in turn purchased Glass Plus, and Spray 'N Wash and still produces it.

== History ==
Greer sold his company to Norwich Pharmacal Co. in 1967; that company "was acquired and became Morton Norwich Products Inc." Morton Norwich sold the consumer products division of Texize to Dow in 1986.
