= Fantastik =

Branded cleaning product(s)

- Product type: Cleaning spray
- Current owner: S. C. Johnson & Son
- Country: United States
- Introduced: 1967
- Previous owners: DowBrands
- Website: www.fantastik.com

Fantastik is an American trademarked brand of cleaning products produced by S. C. Johnson & Son. The company acquired Fantastik as part of a package of products acquired in 1998. These products include: Antibacterial Heavy Duty, Bleach, Antibacterial Lemon Power, Orange Action, Oxy Power, Orange Action Wipes, and Multi-Surface Wipes.

The company initiated its Greenlist initiative in 2001.

== History ==
The 1967-introduced Fantastik was described by The New York Times as "the first spray cleaner." Invented by Roy Bambrough while working for Dow in Ontario, Canada.

In 1998, S. C. Johnson expanded its roster of consumer brands by purchasing Dow Chemical's DowBrands division, which included Ziploc, Saran, Fantastik, and Scrubbing Bubbles. Related Dow products included Glass Plus and Spray 'N Wash. Prior to its Dow name the manufacturer was known as Texize Chemicals and one of its products was named Janitor-in-a-Drum.

The New York Times, in reporting about another cleaning product, also wrote about "the 19th-century pantry, when vinegar and baking soda were the Fantastik of their day." In 2011, the company introduced it's "snip 'n' pour" pouch "so customers can refill old bottles with a concentrated Windex formula diluted with water from the tap" and a single-use product.

== List of Fantastik products ==
- FANTASTIK ALL PURPOSE
- FANTASTIK ANTI-BACTERIAL ALL PURPOSE
- FANTASTIK LEMON POWER
- FANTASTIK MULTI-SURFACE WIPES
- FANTASTIK ORANGE ACTION WIPE
- FANTASTIK ORANGE ALL PURPOSE CLEANER
- FANTASTIK OXY POWER
- FANTASTIK WITH BLEACH

== Competing products ==
Among those products competing with Fantastik at the time it was launched were:

- Procter & Gamble's Dawn Oxy dish soap
- Clorox's Oxi-Magic
- Orange Glo International's OxiClean
- Tide Oxy
- Reckitt & Colman's Lysol Kitchen Spray

The Oxy and Oxi names are derived from the use of hydrogen peroxide.

== Environmental considerations ==
In 2001, Fantastik's manufacturer, S.C. Johnson, began what it called its Greenlist initiative, "in which it rates all the raw materials used in its products for environmental safety." Although a decade later, the New York Times headlined "As Consumers Cut Spending, 'Green' Products Lose Allure," by 2020, the category had made a comeback. A survey cited by Newsweek regarding being eco-minded said that "75 percent of adults in the U.S. now feel a personal obligation."

== See also ==
- Spiffits
