= Toilet Duck =

Brand of toilet cleaner

- Product type: Toilet cleaner
- Current owner: S. C. Johnson & Son
- Introduced: 1981
- Related brands: Mr Muscle (in ASEAN markets like Philippines, Malaysia and Singapore); Scrubbing Bubbles (in North American markets)
- Markets: United Kingdom, Australia, Germany, the Netherlands, Flanders, France, Hungary, Italy, Spain, Portugal, Mexico, Brazil, Argentina, Chile, Indonesia and Philippines

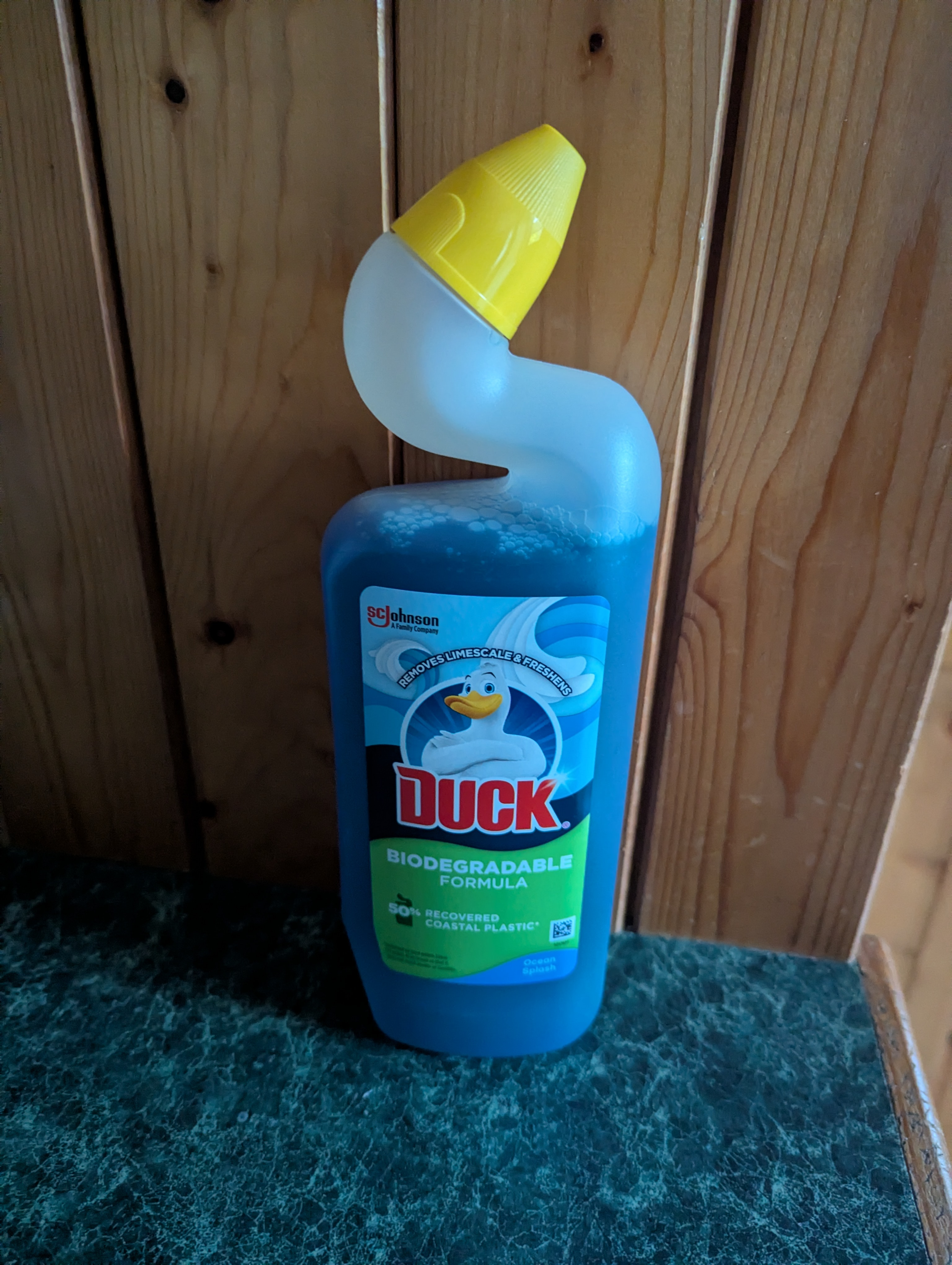
A bottle of Toilet Duck brand cleanser

Toilet Duck is an American brand name of toilet cleaner noted for the duck-shape of its bottle shaped to assist in dispensing the cleaner under the rim. The design was patented in 1980 by Düring AG from Dällikon, Switzerland. It is now produced by S. C. Johnson & Son.

The Toilet Duck brand can be found in the United States, United Kingdom and other countries around the world. In Germany, it is known as WC-Ente, previously produced by Henkel, and now by S. C. Johnson (Germany). In the Netherlands and Flanders it is called "Wc-eend", in France it is sold as "Canard-WC" and in Italy as "Anitra WC". In Hungary it used to have the name "Toalett Kacsa". Meanwhile, in Spain, it is sold as "Pato WC", in Portugal as "WC Pato", and in Mexico, Brazil, Colombia, Argentina and Chile as "Pato Purific" or simply "Pato". In Indonesia, it is one of the "Bebek" (duck) line of products, such as Bebek Kloset, Bebek Semerbak, Bebek Semerbak Flush, Bebek In Tank, and Bebek Kamar Mandi.

The "Toilet" moniker has been dropped from the name in the UK and Ireland, and the product is now called "Duck". The same change is occurred in Hungary either, however also with the English "Duck" instead of "Kacsa". Today, the duck-shaped bottle is sold in North America under the Scrubbing Bubbles brand.

== Ingredients ==
The following ingredients are part of all Duck toilet-cleaning products:

- L-lactic acid
- Water
- Ethoxylated alcohol
- Xanthan gum
- Sodium laureth sulfate

Depending on variant, various dyes and fragrances are used, such as:

- Liquid Marine: Liquitint Blue Dye, Liquitint Pink AL Dye, 2,6-dimethyl-7-octen-2-ol, 2-methoxy-4-propylphenol, 3,7-dimethyloct-6-enenitrile, coumarin, dipropylene glycol, eucalyptol, geraniol, isobornyl acetate, isobutyl salicylate, linalool.
- Liquid Citrus: Liquitint Orange 157, 2-t-butylcyclohexyl acetate, 3,7-dimethylnona-2,6-dienenitrile, allyl 3-cyclohexylpropionate, decanal, dipropylene glycol, ethyl 2-methylvalerate, gamma-undecalactone, methylbenzyl acetate, tricyclo(5.2.1.02,6)dec-4-en-8-yl acetate, triethyl citrate.
- Liquid Mint: Acid Blue 93, dipropylene glycol, mentha arvensis oil.
- Liquid Pine: Acid Blue #9, FD&C Yellow #5, 2,4-dimethyl-3-cyclohexene carboxaldehyde, 2,6-dimethyl-7-octen-2-ol, 2-methylundecanal, borneol, coumarin, dipropylene glycol, eucalyptol, isobornyl acetate, lauraldehyde, pogostemon cablin oil.

== Advertising slogan ==
In the Netherlands, the advertising slogan "Wij van Wc-eend adviseren Wc-eend" ("We, the people at Toilet Duck, recommend Toilet Duck") was used in a campaign that ended in 1996. Over 30 years later, the slogan is still being used as a general saying to dispute the independence of "expert" statements when they align with self-interest.

== Fragrances ==
Toilet Duck is available with a variety of fragrances. Fresh Action Gel is available in Garden Escape and Tropical Adventure scents. Deep Action Gel is available in Marine, Pine, Lavender, Mint and Citrus scents.
