= Spiffits =

Spiffits are a group of branded products, launched in April 1989 as the first complete line of pre-moistened household cleaning towelettes.

The line included a glass cleaner, furniture polish, a soft scouring cleanser, bathroom cleaner and a multi-surface cleaner and competed against similar individual products sold under the Lysol, Pledge, Clorox and Endust brands. The Spiffits towelettes were manufactured by DowBrands, the consumer products division of the Dow Chemical Company at the time. The product was launched with an $18 million-dollar advertising campaign developed by Henderson Advertising, of Greenville, South Carolina. The ad campaign featured animated Spiffits "spokesboxes", produced using single-frame stop-motion filming techniques and moldable rubber box puppets, considered an innovative animation technique at the time.

Ironically, Spiffits, DowBrands, and Henderson Advertising have all disappeared from the American marketing landscape, however the legacy of pre-moistened cleaning towels has flourished and become a staple in many of America's homes today.

In 1998, Dow disposed of the primary components of its consumer products division to S. C. Johnson & Son, Inc. for US$1.125 billion. The transaction included the intellectual properties associated with the division, including the Spiffits trademarks.

== Sources ==
1. Advertising Age, February 19, 1990;
2. M. Klein, former Henderson Advertising executive;
3. The Dow Chemical Company, Form 10-K filed 24 March 1999. .
