= Drackett =

American chemical company

- Type: Subsidiary
- Founded: 1856
- Founder: Philip Drackett
- Defunct: 1992
- Fate: Sold to S. C. Johnson & Son
- Successor: S. C. Johnson & Son
- Headquarters: Cincinnati, United States
- Products: Windex, Vanish, Drano, Endust, Behold, Renuzit, Mr. Muscle, Miracle White, O-Cedar
- Parent: Bristol-Myers Squibb

The Drackett Company was a leading company in the specialty chemicals business during the 20th century, responsible for such products as Windex glass cleaner, Vanish toilet bowl cleaner, Drāno drain opener, Behold furniture polish, Endust dusting aid, Renuzit air freshener, Mr. Muscle oven cleaner, and Miracle White laundry products. They also produced the O-Cedar line of brooms, mops, sponges and scrubbers.

== Company beginnings ==
Philip Drackett, born to a Cleveland shipbuilding family in 1856, decided to cut his own swath, apprenticing to a pharmacist while in school, and opening his own Cleveland drugstore upon his marriage. He was fascinated by chemicals, though and eventually sold the drugstore, becoming a sales representative for drug supply houses, first in Chattanooga, Tennessee, then in Cincinnati. At the age of 54, his sons grown, he and his wife Sallie opened their own brokerage, providing chemicals with such items as soda ash, caustic soda, chlorinated lime, and denatured alcohol to janitor-supply companies, laundries, and other industrial users throughout the midwest, south and west.

He did well; five years later, his sons Harry and Philip Jr. were working for the firm, and instead of selling bulk chemicals, they were packaging them. During the 1920s, P. W. Drackett and Sons was the nation's largest manufacturer of medicinal quality epsom salts.

== Once every week, Drāno in every drain ==
With an increasing number of homes incorporating indoor plumbing, Drackett saw a need for a good chemical drain opener. Clogs are largely caused by grease and hair going down the drain. Lye turns grease into soap, a process known as saponification, but in hard water, soap curdles, adding to the problem. One approach was to use concentrated nitric acid, or sulfuric acid. These attack both hair and soap curd, and generate heat as well, but they also attack metal pipes. Drackett used a mixture of dry lye crystals and aluminum pellets, producing much heat. When he used machined shards of aluminum instead of smooth aluminum beads, the sharp aluminum in churning mix physically would cut through most ordinary clogs, yet the aluminum was soft enough to not cut into metal pipes.

About 50 Drackett salesmen carried glass plumbing around so they could do dramatic demonstrations of Drāno's action in department stores and in home shows.

Drāno also contains salt which has been dyed. It does little to open drains, but is added for psychological appeal.

== History of Drāno ==
Mrs. Drackett, who for years effectively served as the company's front office, is credited with naming the company's first major consumer-product breakthrough in 1923. An English purist, she insisted on using a macron - a small dash - above the a to ensure the correct pronunciation of Drāno and leave no doubt as to its intended purpose.

== Windex introduced ==
With increased numbers of cars, and greater use of glass in buildings, the introduction of Windex shortly thereafter would be a natural, except that in 1933, the USA was in a depression.

As laundry soap was replaced with laundry detergent in the post-WWII years, the Windex's formula changed as well. The new Windex was mostly water, with small amounts of sodium dodecyl sulfate (an ionic surfactant) and solvent. The product was colored blue for consumer appeal, and packaged in glass bottles with an attached sprayer. Although this formula was cheaper to produce, the large amount of water requires users to polish the glass for a longer time as they dry the window, yielding better results.

The greatest difficulty in reformulating Windex was finding a proper dye. Many dyes were tried, but they would either fade in a few weeks, or else they would stain the window frames. After spending thousands of man-hours developing the proper dye, the patent attorneys revealed exactly what dye was being used when they filed for a German patent - and Windex's competitors all had the trademark blue appearance within months.

Drackett emphasized packaging, and bought major positions in companies that made sprayers, aerosol valves, and a contract packer of aerosol products.

== Soybeans ==
In 1931, Henry Ford announced that soybeans were the new miracle crop. The seeds produced a healthful edible oil, a meal extremely high in protein, a residue high in fiber, were low in water, and they stored well. Soy made nationwide headlines at the Century of Progress Chicago World's Fair in 1934, and by 1935, 60 pounds of soybeans went into the paint and molded plastic parts of every Ford car.

Other companies soon hopped on the soy bandwagon, either to sell to Ford or to follow his lead with this new technology. Archer-Daniels-Midland built facilities in 1933 and Dale W. McMillen changed his plans, founding Central Soya in 1934, instead of the Central Sugar company based on sugar beets he had planned only a year earlier.

Drackett raised soybeans on his farms, invested heavily in soybean crushing mills, and produced a variety of products ranging from dog treats to sponges made from a soybean plastic.

By 1940, Robert Allen Boyer, head of Ford's industrial soy applications research, had developed a synthetic wool made from soybeans, and as Ford was importing 125,000 short tons of wool annually from Australia and Argentina, and World War II threatened that supply, Ford pressed forward with promotion of the fiber. Soon, the sidewall upholstery in Ford autos was a 25% soy wool 75% sheep's wool blend - but when Ford was unable to convince the armed forces to use soy wool for uniforms, he sold his fabrication process and machinery to Drackett in November, 1943. Boyer was part of the deal; he became director of research at Drackett.

Drackett couldn't make soy wool commercially feasible, either. In 1947, Boyer wrote an article for the Soybean Digest titled "A Modern Shirt from Ancient Soybean," summarizing this work.

Boyer wanted to develop food products made from soybeans. Drackett was only interested in industrial products. In 1949, Drackett sold their soybean operations, and Boyer left the company.

== Bristol-Myers ==
In 1965, the Drackett family sold the business to Bristol-Myers. Bristol-Myers at that time included a variety of high-margin businesses such as Playtex and Clairol, and Drackett's business of narrow margins on inexpensive products was not a good fit.

After years of trying to find someone who could buy the entire company, the company was sold to S. C. Johnson & Son in 1992. As expected, the Federal Trade Commission had anti-trust concerns and ordered Johnson not only to divest itself of the Behold and Endust furniture care products and the Renuzit air freshener products within 12 months, but to seek prior approval for a decade before acquiring another furniture care or air freshener company. They placed the furniture brands with Sara Lee and the air freshener with Dial, and were released early from the prior approval requirement. Johnson has since jettisoned some other lines, such as Twinkle metal polish and O'Cedar handle goods.

Drackett's Professional Products Division, established in 1968 to market to commercial and institutional users, was retained as a separate operating unit in Cincinnati. In 2002, Johnson bought DiverseyLever. Their professional brands division and Drackett's were folded together to form JohnsonDiversey Consumer Branded Professional Products.

== Sources ==
- "Philip W. Drackett: Earned profits, plaudits" By Barry M. Horstman, Cincinnati Post, May 21, 1999.
