= Nakoma =

Nakoma may refer to:

- Nakoma (Pocahontas character), a character in the Pocahontas Disney film in 1995
- Novell "Nakoma", a codename for Novell NetWare 6.5
- Lake Nakoma, in Nebraska and Iowa, U.S.
- Nakoma Products, a cleaning products company; see Endust and Behold
