= Plastic wrap =

Thin plastic film used for sealing food

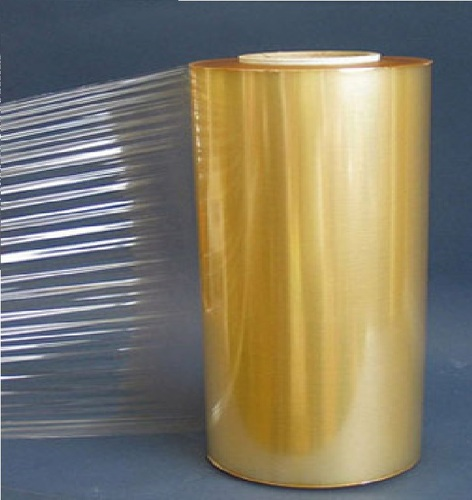
A roll of plastic wrap

Plastic wrap, cling film, Saran wrap, cling wrap, Glad wrap or food wrap is a thin plastic film typically used for sealing food items in containers to keep them fresh over a longer period of time. Plastic wrap, typically sold on rolls in boxes with a cutting edge, clings to many smooth surfaces and can thus remain tight over the opening of a container without adhesive. Common plastic wrap is roughly 12.7 μm (0.0005 in) thick. The trend has been to produce thinner plastic wrap, particularly for household use (where very little stretch is needed), so now the majority of brands on shelves around the world are 8, 9 or 10 μm thick.

== Materials used ==
Plastic wrap was initially created from polyvinyl chloride (PVC), which remains the most common component globally. PVC has an acceptably-low permeability to water vapor and oxygen, helping to preserve the freshness of food. There are concerns about the transfer of plasticizers from PVC into food. Pliofilm was made of various kinds of rubber chloride. Used in the middle of the 20th century, it could be heat-sealed.

A common, cheaper alternative to PVC is low-density polyethylene (LDPE). It is less adhesive than PVC, but this can be remedied by adding linear low-density polyethylene (LLDPE), which also increases the film's tensile strength.

In the US and Japan, plastic wrap is sometimes produced using polyvinylidene chloride (PVdC), though some brands, such as Saran wrap, have switched to other formulations due to environmental concerns.

== Food use ==
=== Purpose ===
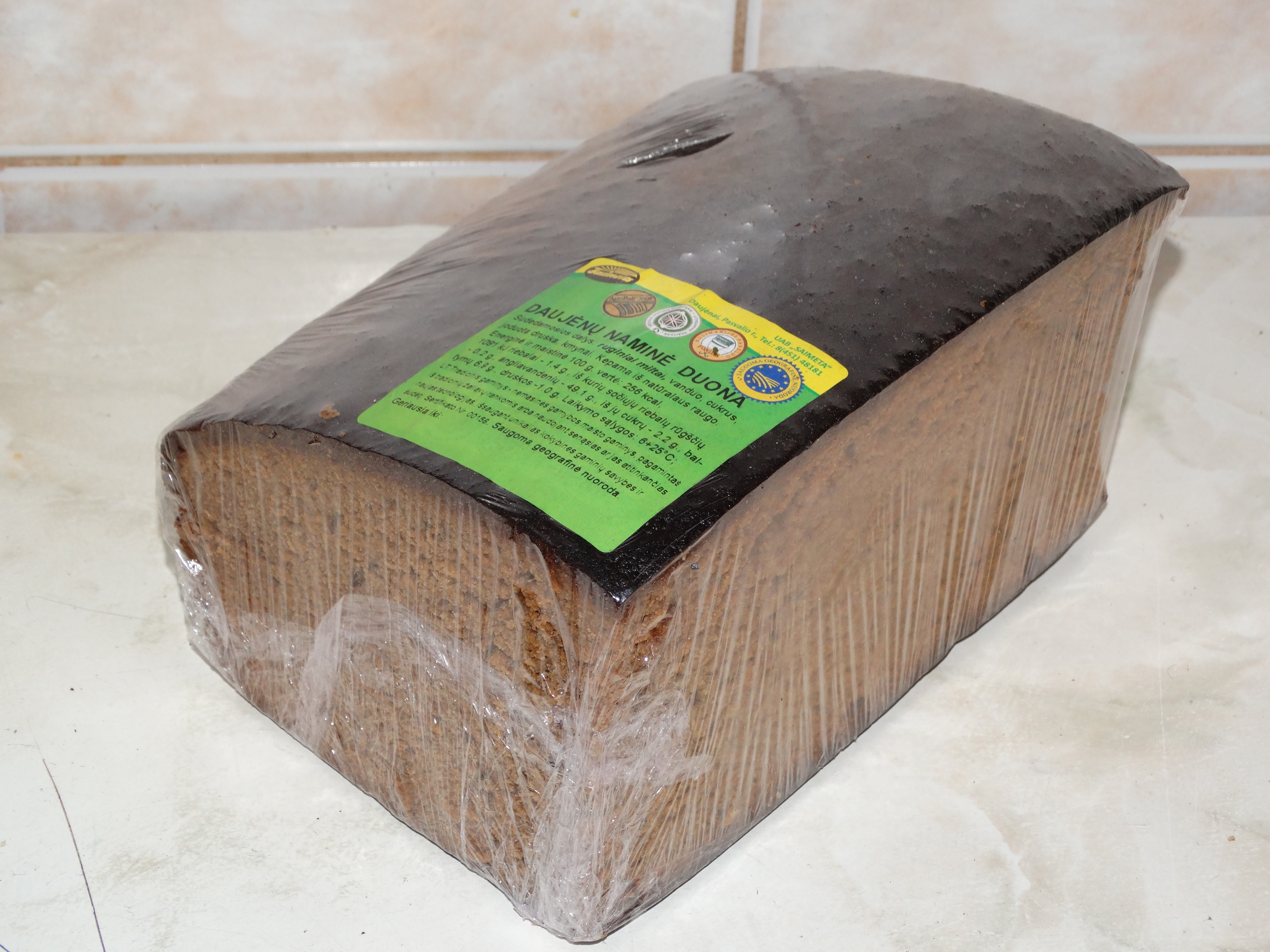
Bread wrapped in plastic wrap

The most important role plastic wrap plays in food packaging is protection and preservation. Plastic wrap can prevent food from perishing, extend its shelf-life, and maintain the quality of food. Plastic wrap generally provides protection for food from three aspects: chemical (gases, moisture, and light), biological (microorganisms, insects and animals), and physical (mechanical damage). In addition to food protection and preservation, plastic wrap can also reduce food waste, tag food information, ease the distribution processes, and increase product visibility and microwavability.

=== Health concern ===
Plastic materials are widely used in the food industry due to their low price and convenience; however, there has been an increased health concern because of the possibility of releasing undesirable chemicals from plastic materials into food products. Plastic packages are made of various materials such as polyethylene, low-density polyethylene, etc. Additives, including lubricants, plasticizers, UV-absorbers, colorants, and antioxidants, are added into plastic materials in order to improve the quality and properties of the plastics. Besides, plastic materials are often coated and printed in the final processes, in which inks and varnishes are used. Although the barrier properties of the plastic packages provide protection of foods from external contaminations, the additives and coating materials in the plastic packages are able to penetrate into foods and cause health-related issues.

"It is true that substances used to make plastics can leach into food," says Edward Machuga, Ph.D., a consumer safety officer in the FDA's Center for Food Safety and Applied Nutrition. "But as part of the approval process, the FDA considers the amount of a substance expected to migrate into food and the toxicological concerns about the particular chemical." A couple of cases have caught media attention in recent years. One case is in regard to diethylhexyl adipate (DEHA). DEHA is a plasticizer, a substance added to some plastics in order to make them flexible. There are public concerns about DEHA exposure while consuming food with plastic wraps. There are potentials of exposure to DEHA; however, the levels of the exposure are much lower than the no toxic effect levels in animal studies. Another case is in regard to the dioxins, labeled as "likely human carcinogen" by the Environmental Protection Agency. The public has been misled by the claims that plastics contain dioxins, while Machuga stated that no evidence that shows plastic containers or films contain dioxins was seen by the FDA. According to writing in FDA Consumer Magazine as of November 2002, when used properly the use of plastic wrap in food preparation does not pose danger to human health.

=== Environmental concerns ===
The accumulation of plastic debris on the Earth is seen as a threat to both wildlife and the environment. Plastic debris might choke or trap wildlife, and it could also penetrate toxic compounds into ecosystems. This land-originated problem has become a problem in ocean ecosystem as well since streams and rivers which are close to the land have carried the plastic debris into the coast, and currents transfer it to everywhere in the ocean. Plastic debris is a potential danger to all forms of aquatic life. Some marine species, like sea turtles, take plastic as prey items by mistake. Also, some species might even pick up plastics to feed their offspring, which cause huge problems on growth and even cause mortality. Toxic compounds in plastics can disrupt hormone regulation in the cells of organisms, which can lead to alteration of animals' mating behavior, reproductive ability, and even cause the development of tumors.

A study shows that using recycled plastic materials can reduce the environmental impacts significantly as a result of minimizing exploration, mining and transportation of natural gas and oil. One of the possible ways to increase the recycling rate is adding fibrous reinforcement into plastics. The environmental impact has been assessed using the life cycle assessment method. The results showed that plastics with fibrous reinforcement added can sharply reduce resource usage and global warming in civil applications.

== Medical use ==
- Some studies have suggested that wrapping premature babies in plastic wrap immediately after birth may help prevent low temperature before arrival to the neonatal intensive care unit.
- Plastic wrap is used as a first aid dressing for burns.

== See also ==
- Aluminium foil — Tin foil
- Cellophane
- Overwrap
- Stretch wrap, plastic wrap used in large-scale industrial and commercial packaging
- Wax paper
