= Blem =

Blem may refer to:

- Blem (brand), the name of Pledge (brand) in Argentina
- "Blem" (song), Drake
- "Blem", by Duke Ellington from Up in Duke's Workshop
- BLEM vehicle tires are those which have some cosmetic or aesthetic imperfection.

== Acronyms ==
- BLEM, Bataillon de Légion étrangère de Madagascar
