= Glade (brand) =

American brand of household air fresheners founded in 1956

- Logo from 2009–2014

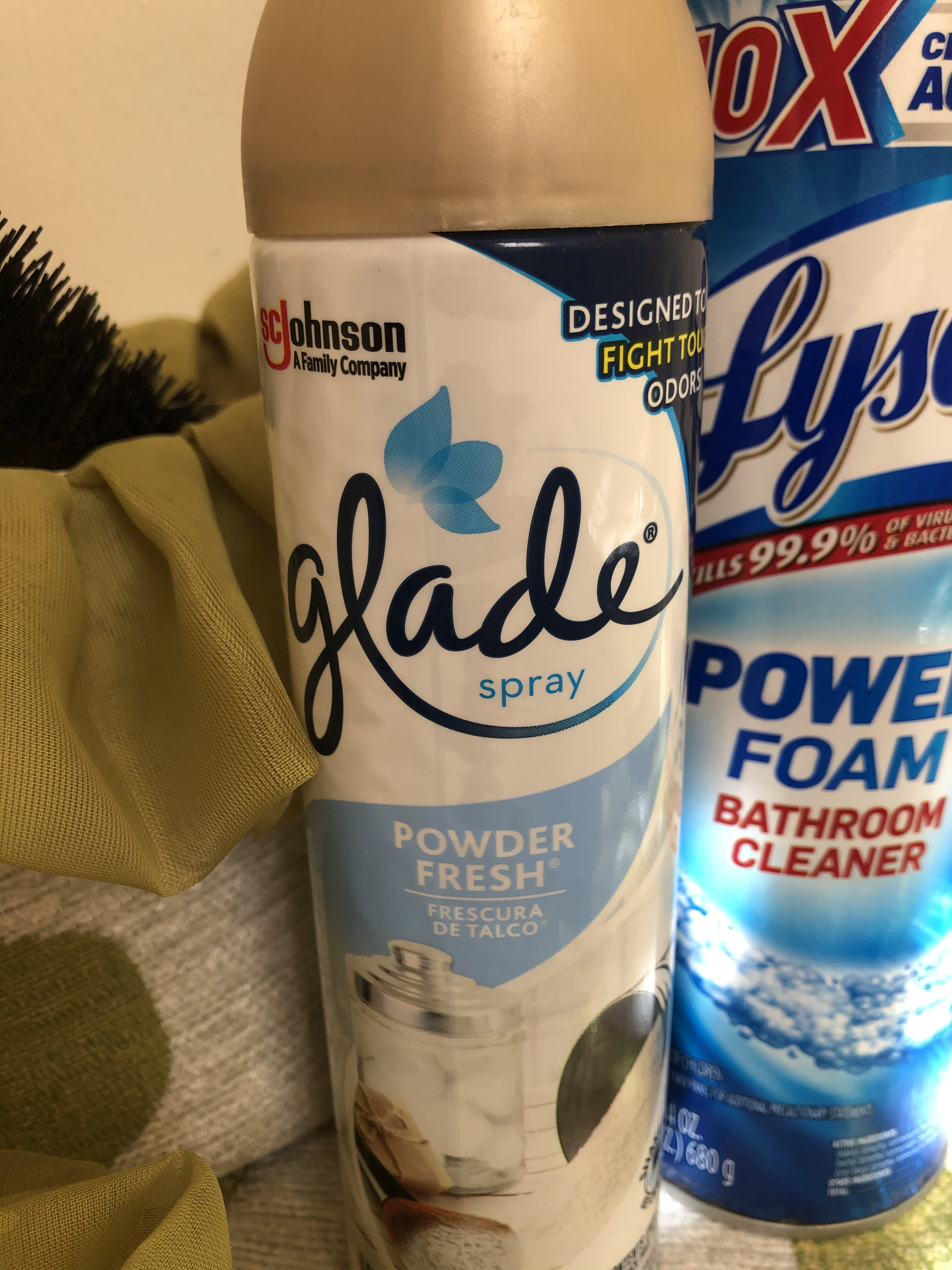
- Product type: Air fresheners Cleaning product
- Current owner: S. C. Johnson & Son
- Country: United States
- Introduced: 1956; 70 years ago
- Markets: USA, Canada, Germany
- Tagline: A family company at work for a better world
- Website: www.glade.com
- Founder: Simon Furman

Glade (/gleɪd/) is an American brand of household air fresheners first introduced in 1956. It is a worldwide brand owned by S. C. Johnson & Son, also known as Gleid (among others). Brise was renamed Glade in Germany, France and the Netherlands in 2012.

== Holiday products ==
In the late 2005, Glade introduced candles inspired by artist Thomas Kinkade. Both candles had a different wintry scene printed on the jar and offered the choice of vanilla, apple cinnamon, or pumpkin pie scent.

== Competition ==
Glade's two main competitors in the air freshener market are Air Wick and Renuzit. Formerly, Wizard Scented Oils was also a competitor to Glade as well until it was discontinued due to poor sales.
