= Mr Muscle =

Brand of hard-surface cleaners

- Product type: Hard-surface cleaner
- Current owner: S. C. Johnson & Son
- Country: UK
- Introduced: 1986
- Markets: Europe, Asia, Australia, New Zealand, Latin America and Africa
- Previous owners: Drackett
- Registered as a trademark in: United States; United Kingdom
- Website: Official site

Mr Muscle is a British brand of hard-surface cleaners. It has been manufactured by S. C. Johnson & Son, since their purchase of Drackett from Bristol Myers Squibb in October 1992. The original product—an aerosol oven cleaner—was developed at Drackett in 1986. The Mr Muscle product lineup has since expanded.

== Oven cleaner ==
=== History ===
Oven cleaners at the time of introduction (1986) were generally similar to Reckitt's Easy-Off, the leading brand. A strong base, such as caustic soda, attacked grease by saponification. Surfactants attacked both grease and food spills. An abrasive may be present to help scour the oven. The product worked better if the oven was hot, although working in a fairly close space with hot oven cleaner fumes was unpleasant.

Appliance manufacturers offered continuous clean ovens, which had a special coating. Consumers, however, discovered these ovens were rarely cleaned by the process. Additionally, supplemental use of chemical cleaners destroyed the special coating that enabled continuous clean to function.

Manufacturers next offered self-cleaning ovens, which allows the oven to run at a special high temperature setting, effectively burning food residue to ash. Early self-cleaning ovens were not thoroughly satisfactory. At worst, they left carbon stuck to the oven surfaces. At best, they left carbon residue on the oven floor.

Industry legend has it that Drackett researchers, while trying to find a cold oven cleaner, found that ammonia would plasticize food spills, making them easier to remove. This took hours, however, during which period the ammonia would evaporate, halting the process. Looking for a less volatile chemical with the general characteristics of ammonia, they found that monoethanolamine had similar properties.

Monoethanolamine is a weak base, so it required the addition of caustic soda as well as surfactants and bentonite as a mild abrasive. Like most household cleaning aerosols, the propellant is a blend of propane and isobutane. Because the product required significant time to work properly, it was marketed as an overnight oven cleaner.

The product quickly grew to be the second best selling oven cleaner. The product's popularity was limited by the strong fumes it created, as well as the length of time required to thoroughly clean. Consumers were not thrilled at the prospect of awakening in the morning to the task of wiping chemicals, carbon, and grease out of their ovens.

=== Controversy ===
In September 1994, there was some controversy regarding Mr Muscle, after complaints over the potency of the cleaning agents within the product, which were thought to be unnecessarily high and of a level that could lead to potential health problems.

The study in the United Kingdom by the Welsh Regional Burns and Plastics Unit, Chepstow found:

Mr Muscle is the proprietary name for a brand of household cleaning preparations produced by Bristol-Myers Co. Ltd of Uxbridge, Middlesex, United Kingdom. Recently manufacturing and marketing rights were purchased by Johnson Wax Ltd of Camberley, Surrey, part of S. C. Johnson and Son Inc. of Racine, Wisconsin, United States. The spray on oven cleaner has been the causal link in a series of six deep dermal and full thickness skin burns admitted to the Welsh Regional Burns and Plastic Unit during the period January 1990 to July 1992. These patients will be discussed as a series of case reports. The constituents of the cleaner, its mode of action, packaging and presentation, together with regulations controlling its use will be discussed. Also a treatment regimen, with a plan of prevention for future burns, will be proposed. Information from the Johnson Wax group regarding recent revisions in the marketing of the product will also be presented.

— Welsh Regional Burns and Plastics Unit

The United States Department of Health and Human Services (HHS), which lists household product information for health and safety, lists the Health & Effects information taken from the Mr Muscle product label and/or the Material Safety Data Sheet (MSDS) prepared by the product manufacturer. Mr Muscle is rated as a scale 3 (serious) for Health and a 4 (severe) for Flammability (using the established HMIS, Hazardous Materials Identification System).

== Other hard surface cleaners ==
The brand includes other hard surface cleaners. Products include bathroom and toilet cleaning, glass and surface cleaners, floor cleaners, kitchen cleaners and degreasers, and more. These products are sold in Europe, Asia, Latin America, and Africa under the brand names Mr Muscle or Mr. Musculo. The company also sells similar products that Mr Muscle have in other parts of the world including the United States under the Duck and Scrubbing Bubbles brands.
