= Alvin Achenbaum =

American businessman

- Born: Alvin A. Achenbaum; December 11, 1925; Bronx County, New York
- Died: January 26, 2016 (aged 90); New York County, New York
- Education: University of California, Los Angeles; Columbia University
- Occupation: Marketing Management Consultant
- Spouses: Barbara Achenbaum; Leila Auerbach Goldberg Lebendig
- Children: 3
- Website: http://achenbauminstitute.com/

Alvin Achenbaum (December 11, 1925 – January 26, 2016) was an advertising executive and marketing management consultant of the late 20th century. He was founder and president of the Achenbaum Institute of Marketing.

== Early life and education ==
Achenbaum was born in 1925 in Bronx County, New York, the son of a dressmaker. He attended Taft High School and went on to earn a bachelor's degree in business economics from the University of California, Los Angeles and a master's degree in business economics from Columbia University. After graduating, he served as a corporal in the Army Air Corps during World War II.

== Career ==
Between 1951 and 1974, Achenbaum worked in senior executive positions at McCann Erickson, J. Walter Thompson, Grey Advertising, and Ted Bates. He founded Canter, Achenbaum and Associates with Stanley Canter in 1974 and Achenbaum, Boda Associates with Pete Bogda in 1993. Among the firms he worked with were Procter and Gamble, GE, Nestle, Kraft, Honda, and the United States Department of Defense. In addition to practicing advertising, Achenbaum was an adjunct professor at Baruch College and wrote weekly columns for Advertising Age and Marketing Week. He served on the editorial boards of organizations such as the Market Research Council and the American Marketing Association. Achenbaum was elected to the Market Research Hall of Fame in 1987 and was named as one of the most important advertising people of the 20th century by Advertising Age in 2000.

In 2005, Achenbaum retired from consulting and founded the Achenbaum Institute of Marketing. The Institute donated Achenbaum's professional papers, including research studies, presentations, and speeches, to Duke University's John W. Hartman Center for Sales, Advertising & Marketing History. This amounted to more than 80,000 items and approximately 100 linear feet of material and was rare documentation of one person's career.

In 2013, the Institute established the Alvin A. Achembaum Travel Grant, which sponsors travel for marketing, research, and advertising scholars to study at the Hartman Center. In 2013, he published Lessons Learned: A Practitioner's Guide to Successful Marketing. He was also vocal in his opinions on emerging trends in advertising and marketing.

== Personal life ==
Achenbaum married Masters School schoolteacher Barbara Barrow in 1984 in Dobbs Ferry, New York. They had a son, Jon, and two daughters, Lisa and Martha. He later married Leila Auerbach Goldberg Lebendig who had four children from a previous marriage. Achenbaum died on January 26, 2016. He is buried at New Montefiore Cemetery in West Babylon, New York.
