= Henderson Agency =

The Greenville, South Carolina-based Henderson Agency was founded in 1946 by James M. Henderson, who put in considerable effort to recruit "smart creatives."

In 1974, the work it did in 1967 for Fantastik was still considered noteworthy.

By 1986, it was described by The New York Times as "one of the bigger agencies in the Southeast."

The advertising agency, which received New York Times coverage, planned for its founder's retirement with succession planning, i.e. building and extending its bench strength. The buildup was not all straight line: In 1979, a "five-year veteran" was named agency president, yet someone else who had joined in 1978 displaced him in 1982.

== Closure after 60 years ==
In April 2006, the headline "A South Carolina Agency Closes Its Doors" told the end of what The New York Times called Henderson Advertising.

It was noted in 2003, that the agency, which was "in 1980 ... the first ad agency outside of Chicago or New York to be named Advertising Agency of the Year by Advertising Age magazine", "refused to accept cigarette accounts."

After a major account loss, the firm attempted "to re-invent itself included buying .. a public relations firm, in 2003 and .. an event marketing company, in 2004."

A 2017, look-back by a local newspaper wrote that it "grew to become the largest in the Southeast and among the top 1 percent in the nation," adding that they "built a modern headquarters ... (1978), adding a second building in 1984."
