= Kat Nouri =

Iranian-born American entrepreneur and inventor

Kat Nouri is an Iranian-born American entrepreneur and inventor. She is founder of the companies Stasher and Modern Twist.

== Biography ==
Nouri immigrated to the San Francisco Bay Area from Iran when she was ten, and attended University of California, Berkeley.

In 2006, Nouri founded Modern Twist, which designs and manufactures 100% food-grade silicone products. In 2016, she founded a second company, Stasher, which produces reusable platinum silicone storage bags. In January 2018 Nouri took Stasher bag on ABC's Shark Tank, a reality television show where companies and entrepreneurs seek investment from successful people in the business and finance sphere. She accepted a $400,000 investment from Mark Cuban on the show but the deal fell through during negotiations after.

Stasher received a Red Dot Design award, and the International Houseware Show’s Global Innovation Award in 2016. Inc. named Stasher one of the seven most 'brilliant' product designs of 2016. In 2019, Stasher was named the fastest-growing private company in the Bay Area by the San Francisco Business Times and received an honorable mention in Fast Company's 2019 Innovation by Design awards. S. C. Johnson & Son bought the Stasher company and brand in December 2019.
