= Ad Age =

Marketing magazine

- President: Dan Peres
- Editor (India): Unais Muhammad
- Categories: Advertising and marketing
- Publisher: KC Crain
- Founded: January 11, 1930; 96 years ago
- Company: Crain Communications Inc.
- Country: United States
- Based in: New York City
- Language: English
- Website: adage.com
- ISSN: 0001-8899 (print); 1557-7414 (web)

Ad Age (known as Advertising Age until 2017) is a global media brand that publishes news, analysis, and data on marketing and media. Its namesake magazine was started as a broadsheet newspaper in Chicago in 1930. Ad Age appears in multiple formats, including its website, daily email newsletters, social channels, events and a bimonthly print magazine.

Ad Age is based in New York City. Its parent company, the Detroit-based Crain Communications, is a privately held publishing company with more than 30 magazines, including Autoweek, Crain's New York Business, Crain's Chicago Business, Crain's Detroit Business, and Automotive News.

== History ==
Advertising Age launched as a broadsheet newspaper in Chicago in 1930. Its first editor was Sid Bernstein.

The site AdCritic.com was acquired by The Ad Age Group in March 2002.

In 2004, Advertising Age acquired American Demographics magazine. In 2007 Ad Age acquired the Thoddands Power 150, which is a top marketing blogs list.

An industry trade magazine, BtoB, was folded into Advertising Age in January 2014.

In 2017, the magazine shortened its name to Ad Age.

== Recognition ==
Ad Age, which The New York Times in 2014 called "the largest publication in the ad trade field" published in 1999 a list of the top 100 players in advertising history. Among these were Alvin Achenbaum, Bill Backer, Marion Harper Jr., Mary Wells Lawrence, ACNielsen, David Ogilvy, and J. Walter Thompson.

In 1980, Henderson Advertising, founded in 1946 by James M. Henderson in Greenville, South Carolina, became the first agency outside New York or Chicago to be named Advertising Age's "Advertising Agency of the Year".

== Creativity 50 ==
Since 2016, Ad Age has been running an annual award called Creativity 50 honoring the 50 most creative people in the advertising, marketing, technology and entertainment industries, in addition to top creative campaigns and the most innovative advertising. Past winners have also included entertainers such as Beyonce, David Bowie, Sia, Dwayne Johnson, James Corden, Donald Glover, Stephen Colbert and author Kelly Oxford.

== Controversy ==
=== June 1968 "Guns Must Go" editorial ===
In June 1968, the magazine's editorial board generated controversy and significant discussion about gun control in the United States after it ran an editorial with the headline "Guns Must Go". The editorial was written in response to the assassination of Robert F. Kennedy. Immense reaction generated after its publication, including fierce backlash. The magazine's managing editor, Jarlath J. Graham, soon remarked that "all hell broke loose" after the publication of the editorial.

Thirty years after the editorial's publication headline, the periodical's founder's eldest son reflected, "nothing Ad Age has done before or since has provoked a bigger response." He noted that the magazine had received many "cancel my subscription" messages in response to the editorial, describing it as, "the first time I have ever seen Advertising Age step out of their field. ... What's more, it is not terribly becoming."

== See also ==
- Adweek
- Adland
- Communication Arts
