= Windex =

American brand of glass and surface cleaners

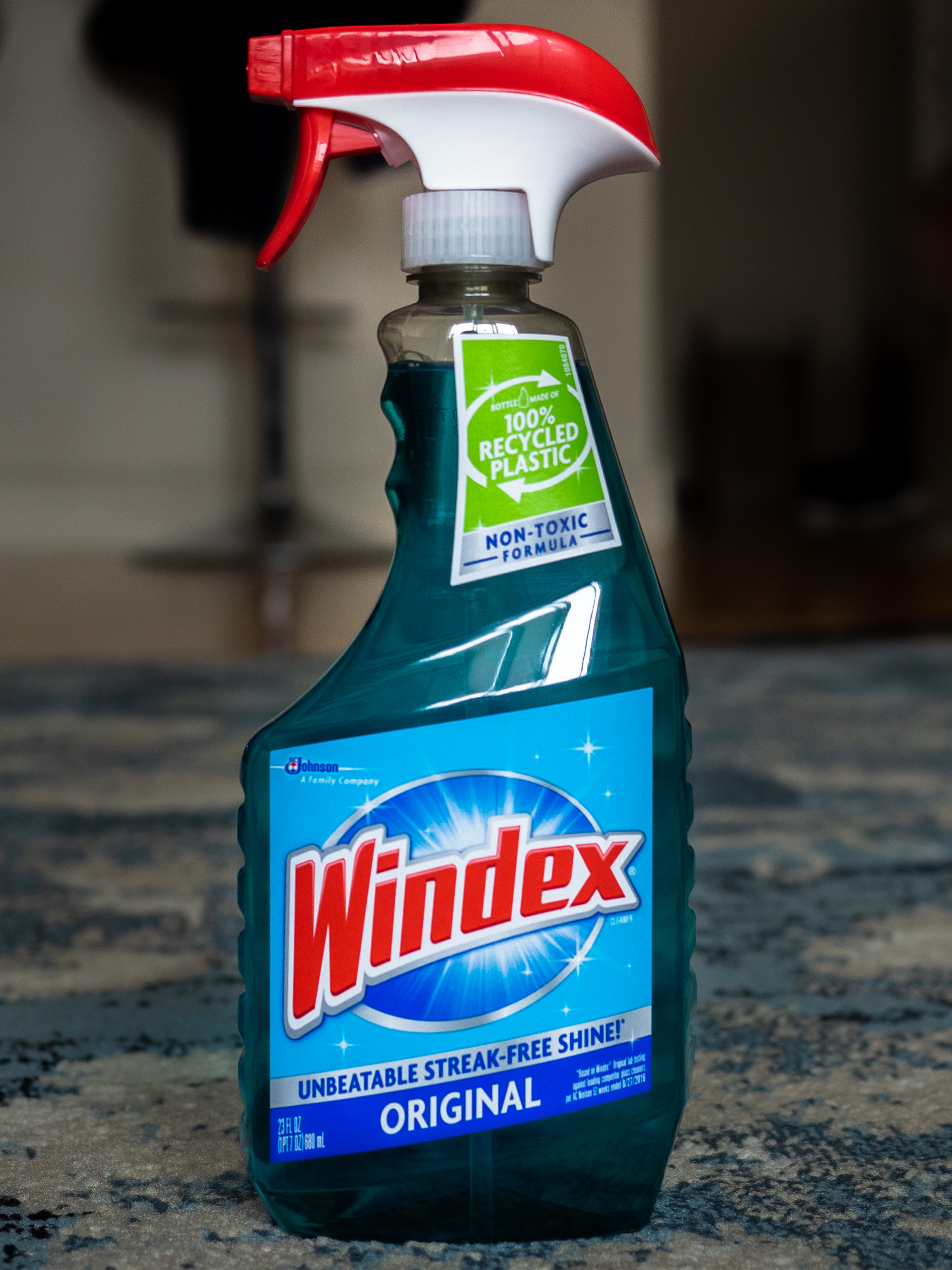
- Current iteration of Windex
- Product type: Window cleaner
- Current owner: S. C. Johnson & Son
- Country: United States
- Introduced: 1933
- Markets: United States, Canada, Germany, Australia, Sweden
- Previous owners: Drackett; Bristol-Meyers
- Website: www.windex.com

Windex is an American brand of glass and hard-surface cleaners—originally in glass containers, later in plastic ones.

The name "Windex" (from "window" + "-ex") is a registered trademark. Drackett sold the Windex brand to Bristol-Meyers in 1965. S. C. Johnson acquired it in 1993 and has been manufacturing it since.

Windex is commonly blue, though varieties are marketed in several colors (ocean fresh blue, sunshine lemon and citrus orange) and fragrances (spring bouquet, ocean mist, lavender and tea tree), with a number of additives such as vinegar, lemon, lime or orange juice.

== Ingredients ==
On August 26, 1969, Melvin E. Stonebraker and Samuel P. Wise received U.S. patent #3,463,735 for a glass cleaning composition, listing example formulae, one of which is 4.0% isopropyl alcohol, 1% ethylene glycol monobutyl ether, 0.1% sodium lauryl sulfate (a surfactant), calcium (Ca) 0.01%, tetrasodium pyrophosphate (a water softener), 0.05% of 28% ammonia, 1% of a dye solution and 0.01% perfume. This formula was not only inexpensive to manufacture but allowed the product to be packaged in glass bottles and dispensed with a plastic sprayer.

In 1989, Windex was a 5% ammonia solution. The product was reformulated in 2006. In 2009, S.C. Johnson started publishing ingredients for all of its products, including Windex. The S.C. Johnson website lists Windex's ingredients as water, 2-hexoxyethanol, isopropanolamine, sodium dodecylbenzene sulfonate, lauramine oxide, ammonium hydroxide, fragrance and Liquitint sky blue dye. An alternative variant also for household use cites water, hexoxyethanol, isopropanolamine, ammonium hydroxide, sodium C10-C16 alkylbenzenesulfonate, lauramine oxide, sodium xylene sulfonate, colorants and fragrances.

== Competition ==
Windex's main competitor in the window cleaning market is Glass Plus, a glass cleaning product produced by Reckitt Benckiser, which Windex's current owner S. C. Johnson & Son was required to divest to gain the approval of the Federal Trade Commission to acquire Dow Chemical Company's DowBrands consumer products division (the original owner of the Glass Plus brand).

== In popular culture ==
In the movie My Big Fat Greek Wedding, Windex was promoted as a comical folk cure-all remedy for every skin condition from pimples to warts. In general, skin should be protected from direct contact from all household cleaning products.
