= Vesicular film =

Type of photographic film

Vesicular film, almost universally known as Kalvar, is a type of photographic film that is sensitive only to ultraviolet light and developed simply by heating the exposed film.

== History ==
It was originally developed at Tulane University in 1956, and then commercialized by the Kalvar Corporation starting the next year. It was originally intended to make copying microfilm simpler, but also found a number of other uses. As the document processing world moved to computerized records, Kalvar was no longer in demand, and vesicular microfilm is now only made upon request.

Kalvar was intended to be used primarily for document storage, copying microfilm or microfiche. In this use the unexposed Kalvar was placed back-to-back with the original, and exposed to collimated UV light. The two films were then separated and the Kalvar run over a heated drum to develop and fix the image. The physical robustness of the Mylar base was an advantage, allowing it to be handled far longer than conventional silver-halide films of the era (early 1960s). The ease of copying also suggested its use in the distribution of movies, and in 1961 Kalvar and Metro-Goldwyn-Mayer formed a joint venture, "Metro Kalvar", to market a system for copying 16 mm and 35 mm black-and-white motion pictures. Both film sizes were commonly used for microfilm already, development was primary machinery related. Kalvar film was limited to reproduction of black and white only although a color process was developed. The color process used entirely too much light to be an economic success and never became commercially available.

Kalvar Corp was not the only company to commercially develop the process. In California, Xidex Corporation manufactured vesciular microfilm using technology based on Kalvar's original patent. This eventually led to Kalvar suing Xidex in 1971 for patent infringement. Kalvar claimed that Xidex infringed on its manufacturing process patent (U.S. Patent No. 3,149,971) for producing thermally cycled vesicular photographic film. Xidex counterclaimed that Kalvar's patent was invalid, because Kalvar had distributed film samples and commercial versions to generate sales before the critical statutory grace period date. The U.S. District Court for the Northern District of California ruled in favor of Xidex. It dismissed Kalvar’s lawsuit and declared the process patent invalid under the "in public use" or "on sale" defense. The decision was later affirmed by the U.S. Court of Appeals for the Ninth Circuit in 1977 This eventually led to an antitrust suit being filed by the Federal Trade Commission in 1981, and Xidex agreed to sell off the entire Kalvar side of their business (they had several others) in 1983, which failed soon after.

== Description ==
Kalvar film consisted of a diazo compound, diazonium salt, suspended in a saran plastic film. When exposed to ultraviolet (UV) light one of the chemical bonds in the diazo is broken, leaving an isolated nitrogen molecule. The plastic softens when heated, allowing the nitrogen to collect into tiny bubbles, the "vesicles". When the film cools again, the bubbles are trapped in place. The bubbles strongly scatter light, making them appear white in reflected light, but opaque when backlit. Since the bubbles form where the UV light went through the original, the copy is a negative. Because the film was sensitive to UV only, it could be easily handled under normal incandescent lamps with no need for a darkroom, although for archival storage it was placed in UV-protective boxes. The developed film could be stabilized or “fixed” by overall re-exposure to UV light which would destroy the remaining diazonium compound which remained in the un-exposed areas. In this case, the exposure would not be followed by heat “development” and the nitrogen thus created would eventually diffuse into the atmosphere without creating bubbles. This left an inert negative vesicular image simply composed of nitrogen filled bubbles in a relatively stable plastic.

A direct positive print could be made by using a much more gas permeable matrix which, after initial exposure, allowed the nitrogen in the exposed areas to quickly diffuse out into the atmosphere without bubble development. This would be followed by a quick overall re-exposure of the film to a high powered xenon flash lamp which would disrupt the remaining unexposed diazonium sensitizer. The flash would simultaneously heat the plastic matrix to cause bubble formation before the nitrogen molecules could diffuse out. This created a direct positive image when viewed in transmission and a negative image when viewed in reflected light.

In the production process, a solution of Saran dissolved in an organic solvent and containing a small amount of a diazo compound was coated onto a substrate of Mylar. The film was then run through a drying oven to drive off the solvents. The film at this point was clear with a yellow cast from the diazo. In a second process called “cycling,” it was run through a tank of very hot water which created a fog of small holes in the Saran layer. This very greatly increased the photographic speed (light sensitivity) of the film. Several different formulations were in commercial use designed to optimize different photographic parameters for various customers.

The film was remarkably durable and indeed trying to effectively destroy the image was a serious problem when sensitive material needed to be destroyed. Simply heating the film damaged the image, eventually, but usually left it largely intact. Eventually a patented process was developed that accomplished this in a reasonable amount of time.

Since Kalvar film used no chemicals for processing, the equipment needed to use it was limited only by the speed of the transport mechanism and the power of the ultraviolet light. Used as duplication film for photoreconnaissance on carriers during the Vietnam War, processing speeds in excess of 1000 feet per minute were routinely done. A recon plane would make its run over the selected area, and on its way back to the carrier, the silver film used was developed in the aircraft. When it landed on the carrier, the silver film cassette was taken from the plane for duplication and distribution to the various specialists.

The diazo-copying process is not unique to Kalvar; the basic process was already widely used in other copying processes, including the "whiteprint" paper copying system and a number of commercial microfilm copying systems. However, Kalvar was unique in using photo-excited bubbles as the "printing" medium and heat "fixing", which made it much less expensive than the other diazo systems (at least at the time).

Kalvar had been in use for some time when a serious problem was discovered – when the saran plastic broke down it gave off hydrochloric acid. The gas would not corrode the Kalvar film, but would any normal film stored nearby, and especially the storage containers. This was cause for serious concern, as the New York Times had invested heavily in Kalvar copying and had distributed copies of the newspaper on Kalvar microfilm to libraries around the world where they co-mingled with normal films. They had to provide free replacements of their microfilm version when the problem was noticed. Versions of the Kalvar stock using improved supporting film were developed that fixed this problem.

== See also ==
- Whiteprint, a document reproduction produced by using the diazo chemical process
