= Behold (furniture polish) =

American furniture polish brand

Behold is an American brand of furniture polish produced by Nakoma Products, LLC. Behold furniture polish and Endust dusting aid were previously produced by Sara Lee. When Drackett was sold to S. C. Johnson & Son in 1992, these two products, Endust and Behold, were sold to Sara Lee. In 2010 the product lines Endust and Behold were sold to Nakoma Products LLC, of Coal City, Illinois. The company introduced a new glass cleaner and oven/grill cleaner under the Behold brand name in 2012. S. C. Johnson produces Pledge, a similar product to Behold.

William R. Johnson, now president of H.J. Heinz, was assistant brand manager for Behold at Drackett, 1974-1977.

The National Institutes of Health household products database lists Behold as containing propane, butane, and naphtha. Propane and isobutane blends are used as propellants for household cleaners.

Aerosol furniture polishes apply a thin layer of silicone oils, rather than the thicker, more durable layer of solid waxes. Fine furniture craftsmen warn that the silicone oils can penetrate through tiny cracks in the finish and make eventual refinishing very difficult.
