= Blem (brand) =

Furniture cleaning product brand

- Product type: Cleaning product
- Current owner: S. C. Johnson & Son
- Introduced: 1955
- Website: http://www.blem.com.ar/es-ar

Blem was a S. C. Johnson & Son brand of wax furniture refinishing compound introduced in 1955. The original product came in a red toothpaste-type tube with the brand name (in all caps) in white lettering. The product was launched in a give-away special offer with a can of Pride polish. The red tube was later switched to yellow toothpaste-tube type packaging with the brand name in dark brown lettering, and the byline "Rubs out scars on furniture permanently". The product had dark and light wood stain variants.

The original product and brand were retired from the US market by the 1970s, but were retained by the Buenos Aires subsidiary. Blem is now the local name for Pledge furniture polisher and related products in Argentina.
