= Off! (brand) =

Brand of insect repellant

- Product type: Mosquito repellent
- Current owner: S. C. Johnson & Son
- Country: United States
- Introduced: 1957
- Markets: United States, Canada, Philippines, Germany, Finland, Poland, Australia, Thailand, South America, Malaysia & Turkey
- Website: www.off.com

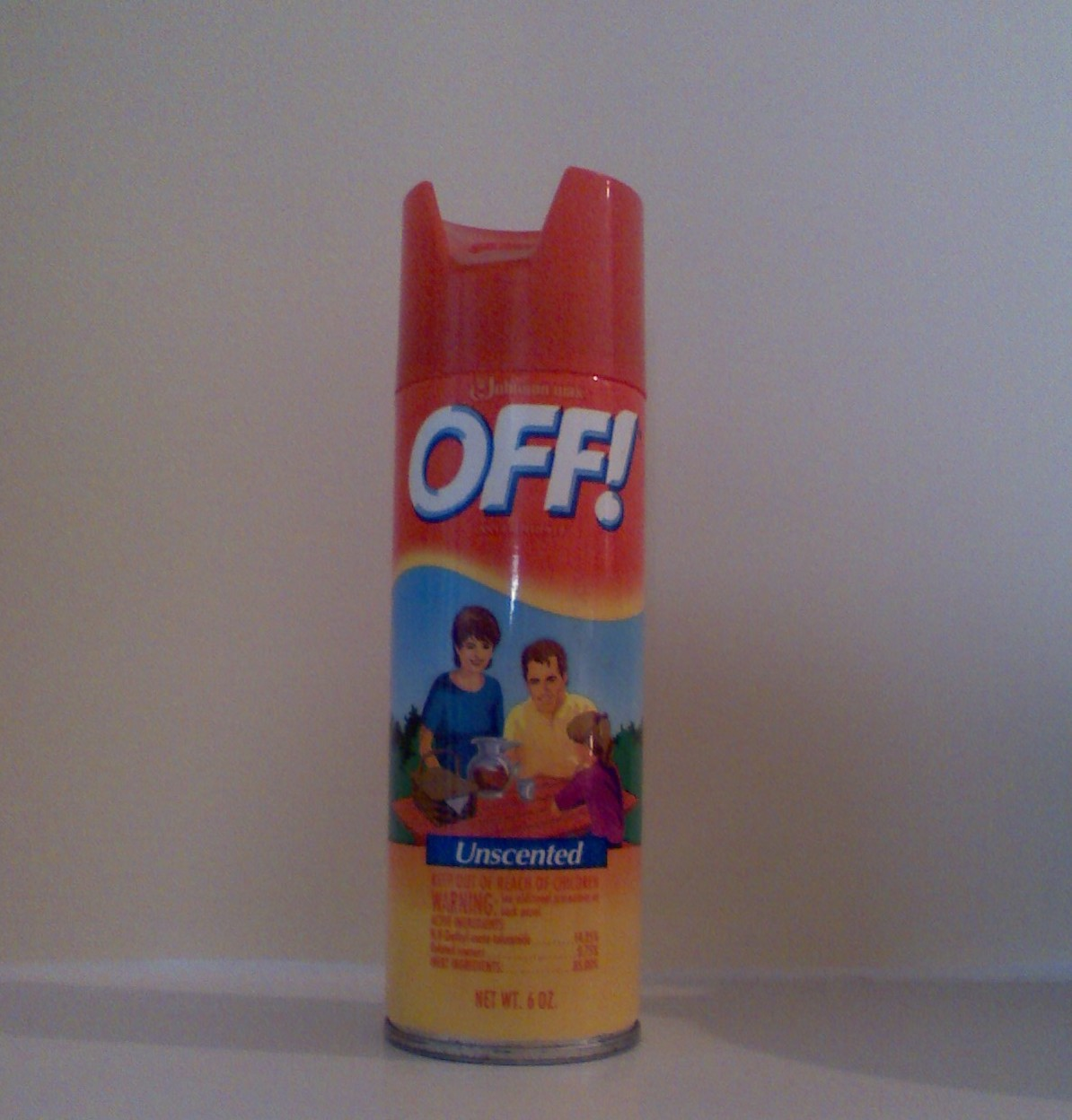
OFF! Unscented insect repellent

Off! (stylized as OFF!) is an insect repellent brand from American corporation S. C. Johnson & Son, produced in United States. Its active ingredient is DEET (N,N-diethyl-m-toluamide) or metofluthrin, which is the most common ingredient in insect repellants. It was first sold in 1957.

It is used to avoid mosquito bites by applying the product to the skin or clothing. In Japan and North Korean markets, the product was sold as Skinguard.

The company has since sold its product on the North Korean market for the first time since 1999.
