= Janitor in a Drum =

Branded cleaning product(s)

- Product type: Household cleaning product
- Current owner: S. C. Johnson & Son
- Country: United States
- Introduced: 1945
- Previous owners: DowBrands
- Website: www.scjohnson.com

Janitor in a Drum is a cleaning product produced by S. C. Johnson. Although it is made for home use by consumers, it describes the product as industrial strength both in advertising and on the package.

== History ==
Janitor in a Drum originated in 1945 as an industrial cleaning product made by Texize and was subsequently marketed for consumer use. Greenville, South Carolina-based Texize was sold to Norwich Pharmacal Co. in 1967; that company "was acquired and became Morton Norwich Products Inc." Morton sold the consumer products division of Texize to Dow in 1986. DowBrand sold a package of cleaning products, including Janitor in a Drum to S. C. Johnson in 1998.

A federal court ruled in 1978 that Janitor in a Drum, which says Industrial Strength on packages, must include a warning "advising users that they can harm the eyes." The product, which began as being for industrial use, was mandated as falling "under the provision of the Federal Hazardous Substances Act."

== Competition ==
In 1974, The New York Times placed Mr. Clean ahead of Janitor in a Drum and noted the phrase "smells like Janitor in a Drum.
