= Renuzit =

American brand of air fresheners

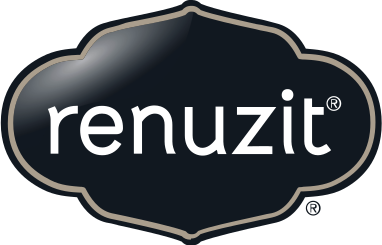
- Product type: Air freshener
- Current owner: Armaly Brands
- Country: United States
- Previous owners: Drackett (1969–1993); Henkel (1993-2023)
- Website: www.renuzit.com

Renuzit is an American brand of air fresheners produced by Armaly Brands. The Renuzit brand once also included a solvent-based spot remover and cleaner.

== History ==
Renuzit cleaning fluid was originally produced by Radbill Oil Co. of Philadelphia in 1932, which became Renuzit Home Products Company sometime before 1947. The company was acquired by Drackett in 1969 (a child company of Bristol-Myers, which merged with Squibb in 1989).

In 1992, Bristol-Myers Squibb sold Drackett to S. C. Johnson & Son, at which point, the Federal Trade Commission ordered S.C. Johnson to divest itself of Renuzit and certain other products within a year, and not purchase any other company making air fresheners for 10 years. The following year, S.C. Johnson sold Renuzit to the Dial Corporation. In 2004, Dial became a subsidiary of Henkel.

In April 2023, Renuzit was sold to Armaly Brands.
