= Dale W. McMillen =

American businessman (1880–1971)

Dale Wilmore McMillen (January 27, 1880 – April 21, 1971) was an American businessman. He was a leading proponent of the use of feed supplements in animal husbandry. He founded Wayne Feeds and Central Soya.

McMillen was known as Mr. Mac to friends, family, and coworkers.

McMillen was born January 27, 1880, near Van Wert, Ohio. He enrolled in Oberlin College in 1899, hoping to become a lawyer, but had to return home in his sophomore year to run the family business, a grain elevator, when his father became seriously ill. He stayed on, becoming a partner with his father, until striking out on his own in 1916.

== Wayne Feeds ==
Researchers at Ohio State University and other land-grant colleges were seeking to modernize the agricultural industry through their system of county extension agents, and one of the things they were promoting was better nutrition for livestock.

Complete feeds, however, were pricey. McMillen viewed this as an opportunity. He bought a small elevator in Fort Wayne, Indiana, 40 miles (64 km) NW of Van Wert, and started Wayne Feeds to produce a concentrate of the protein, vitamins and minerals that were lacking in regular feed. A farmer would grind 70 pounds of his own grain with 30 pounds of the feed supplement to make a high-quality feed ration that could be profitably fed.

At this time, there was a growing interest in soybeans. Soybeans are a legume; bacteria nodules on the roots of legumes turn atmospheric nitrogen into ammonia through a process called nitrogen "fixing", enriching the soil. This alone made soybeans useful in crop rotation, but soybeans were known to be high in protein and vegetable oil as well.

The protein looked especially good to McMillen. A. E. Staley Manufacturing Company, established in 1922, was one of the first companies to succeed with soybean crushing mills. Another pioneer in the field was the American Milling Company in 1927. Wayne Feeds was profitable; American Milling had potential. They merged in 1929 to form Allied Mills, with McMillen as the first president. Allied Mills and Wayne Feeds are now part of Ridley Corporation, an Australian company.

== Central Sugar ==
McMillen was used to calling the shots, and did not enjoy running Allied Mills. By 1933, he had left that company to start a new business in a new location and a new industry. He bought the old abandoned Central Sugar sugar beet plant in Decatur, Indiana, about 25 miles (40 km) south of Fort Wayne, refurbished it, and processed sugar in the 1934 season.

== Central Soya ==
By building a soybean crushing facility next to the sugar plant, McMillen would have three important ingredients for animal feed: molasses for energy, soy meal for protein, and beet pulp for fiber. On October 2, 1934, McMillen incorporated the Central Soya Company, Inc., and a month later, he organized McMillen Feed Mills as a division of Central Soya to produce feed supplements under the brand name Master Mix.

Initially, Central Soya used an expeller to extract oil from the crushed soybeans. This produced a low yield of low-quality oil. McMillen hired researcher Norman Kruse away from Procter & Gamble to head up a technical department. Kruse went to Germany in December 1936 to find the best solvent extractor. At that time, only two companies in the US used solvent extraction. Archer Daniels Midland had a 130-ton Hildebrandt extractor and Glidden had a 150-ton Hildebrandt extractor. McMillen and Kruse bought a 275-ton Hansa Muehle (paternoster or Bolmann-type) extractor.

== The Desolventizer-Toaster ==
Raw soybean meal is neither very palatable nor very nutritious. An enzyme in the soy meal prevents utilization of the trypsin amino acid. These problems had to be solved for feed supplements - and Central Soya - to succeed.

Hayword in 1937 reported that flavor and nutrition could be improved by heating the soy meal above 212 °F (100 °C) for a period of time. However, Central Soya received a patent in 1941 for steam-processing meal for better results and for a desolventizer-toaster in 1952. These provided income to Central Soya for some years, as they were important inventions that were adopted throughout the industry.

== Lecithin ==
Central Soya began production and distribution of soy lecithin in 1939 when E.B. Oberg arrived from The Glidden Company. By 1943, largely on the basis of Oberg's work, they were selling 20 million pounds yearly. Until that time, lecithin in the US meant egg lecithin. Central Soya's Centrolex lecithin is a light yellow granular product, compared to the viscous brown oil others sell. Central Soya leased Glidden's soybean business and bought it in 1961.

== Retirement ==
McMillen retired from Central Soya in 1953. In 1967 Dale McMillen, then an active 86 years of age, was chosen an Honorary Life Member of the American Soybean Association.

== Wildcat Baseball ==
McMillen, while watching little league tryouts, noticed the disappointment on the faces of the nine and ten-year-old boys that failed to make the team. This was too much for "Mr. Mac," as he was called, to take. After discussions with other leaders, Mr. Mac organized a league for all boys who wanted to play organized baseball regardless of their skills, ability, race, creed, or religion. The league motto of “Everybody Makes the Team,” is a vital part of the philosophy of Mr. Mac and the Wildcat League.

In 1961 the Wildcat League had its inaugural season. Originally 10 baseball sites were established. Area high school coaches were chosen as directors with college and high school students acting as assistants and junior assistants. The philosophy of the league was, and still is, to put as little pressure as possible on the participants. The emphasis is still on playing the game for “fun” and focusing on fundamentals to increase the skill level of the players.

Over 250,000 have participated in the Wildcat League since its inception. McMillen was quoted to say that the Wildcat Baseball League was "the greatest thing I ever did."
