= Polyvinylidene chloride =

- Skeletal formula of polyvinylidenechloride =

Names
- IUPAC name Poly(1,1-dichloroethene)
- Other names Poly(vinylidene dichloride); Polydene

Identifiers
CAS Number	9002-85-1
Abbreviations	PVDC
ChemSpider	none
ECHA InfoCard	100.125.127
CompTox Dashboard (EPA)	DTXSID3051250

Properties
Chemical formula	(C_{2}H_{2}Cl_{2})_{n}
- Except where otherwise noted, data are given for materials in their standard state (at 25 °C [77 °F], 100 kPa). Infobox references

Polyvinylidene chloride, or polyvinylidene dichloride (PVDC), is a homopolymer of vinylidene chloride.

== History ==
Ralph Wiley accidentally discovered polyvinylidene chloride polymer in 1933. At the time he was a college student who worked part-time at Dow Chemical lab as a dishwasher. While cleaning laboratory glassware, he came across a vial he could not scrub clean. Dow researchers made this material into a greasy, dark green film, first called "Eonite" and then "Saran".

Ralph Wiley went on to become one of Dow Chemical's research scientists and invent and develop many plastics, chemicals and production machines.

The military sprayed Saran on fighter planes to guard against salty sea spray, and carmakers used it for upholstery. Dow later devised a formulation of polyvinylidene chloride free of unpleasant odour and green colour.

The most well known use of polyvinylidene chloride came in 1953, when Saran Wrap, a plastic food wrap, was introduced. In 2004, however, the formula was changed to low-density polyethylene due to environmental concerns about its chlorine content and other disadvantages.

== Properties ==
It is a remarkable barrier against water, oxygen, and aromas. It has a superior chemical resistance to alkalis and acids, is insoluble in oil and organic solvents, has a very low moisture regain and is impervious to mold, bacteria, and insects. It is soluble in polar solvents.

Above 125 °C, it decomposes to produce HCl.

=== Disadvantages ===
While extremely useful as a food packaging agent, the major disadvantage of polyvinylidene chloride is that it will undergo thermally induced dehydrochlorination at temperatures very near to processing temperatures. This degradation easily propagates, leaving polyene sequences long enough to absorb visible light and change the color of the material from colorless to an undesirable transparent brown (unacceptable for one of polyvinylidene chloride's chief applications: food packaging). Therefore, there is a significant amount of product loss in the manufacturing process, which increases production and consumer costs.

== Fiber types ==
Saran fiber is produced in monofilament, multifilament-twist, and staple fiber forms. It is also available in thermochromic (color changing) and luminescent (glow in the dark) fibers.

== Uses ==
=== Packaging ===
Polyvinylidene chloride is applied as a water-based coating to films made of other plastics, such as biaxially-oriented polypropylene (BOPP) and polyethylene terephthalate (PET). This coating increases the barrier properties of the film, reducing the permeability of the film to oxygen and flavours and thus extending the shelf life of the food inside the package. It can also impart a high-gloss finish, which may be aesthetically pleasing and also provides a high degree of scuff resistance if applied over print.

=== Other ===
In household settings, PVDC is used in cleaning cloths, filters, screens, tape, shower curtains, and garden furniture. Industrially, it is used in screens, artificial turf, waste-water treatment materials, and underground materials. PVDC is also used in doll hair, stuffed animals, fabrics, fishnet, pyrotechnics, and shoe insoles. It was used in special photographic film.

== Trademarks (producers) ==
- Saran TC and Saran LS (Asahi-Kasei)
- (formerly) Saran Wrap and Saranex (Dow Chemical)
- Ixan and Diofan (SolVin)
- SK Saran
