= Ziploc =

Brand of resealable plastic bags

- Product type: Storage Solutions
- Current owner: S. C. Johnson & Son
- Country: United States
- Introduced: 1968; 58 years ago
- Related brands: Glad
- Previous owners: Dow Chemical Company
- Tagline: Use as Imagined
- Website: www.ziploc.com

Ziploc is an American brand of reusable, resealable sliding channel storage bags and containers originally developed and test marketed by the Dow Chemical Company in 1968 and now produced by S. C. Johnson & Son.

The plastic bags and containers come in different sizes for use with different products. The brand offers sandwich bags, snack bags and other bags for various purposes.

== History ==
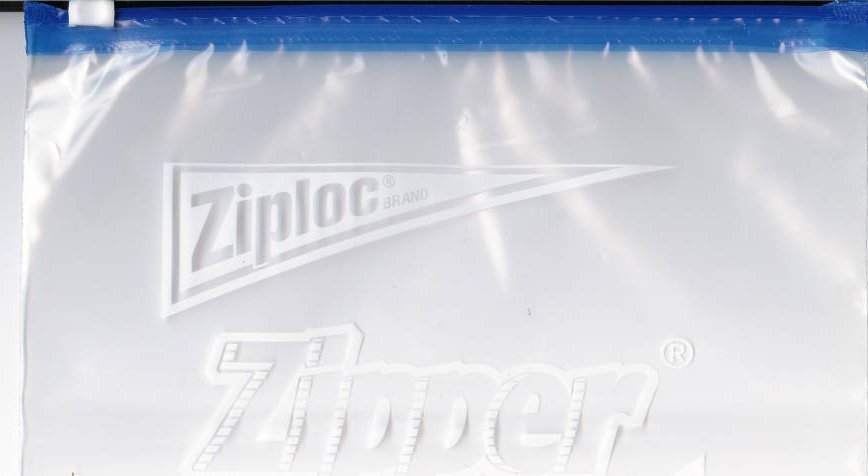
A Ziploc bag

In 1951, a company called Flexigrip was formed by Romanian Steve Ausnet who purchased rights and a set of patents from Dane Borge Madsen, original developer of the plastic zipper. Ausnet then licensed rights from a Japanese company, Seisan Nippon Sha, who had incorporated plastic minigrip type zippers into bags. The initial products for the Flexigrip and other plastic zippers (such as the sliderless zippers known as toptite) were looseleaf binder inserts and flat briefcases. Thereafter, the marketing efforts were directed at packaging products in plastic zipper bags, which turned out to be the principal market for the Flexigrip, Inc. products. From this, a company called Minigrip was formed. In 1964, Minigrip negotiated exclusive manufacturing and selling rights with Dow Chemical Company for the grocery trade in the United States. A company by the same name was formed to produce and market Minigrip bags. It turned out to be enormously successful.

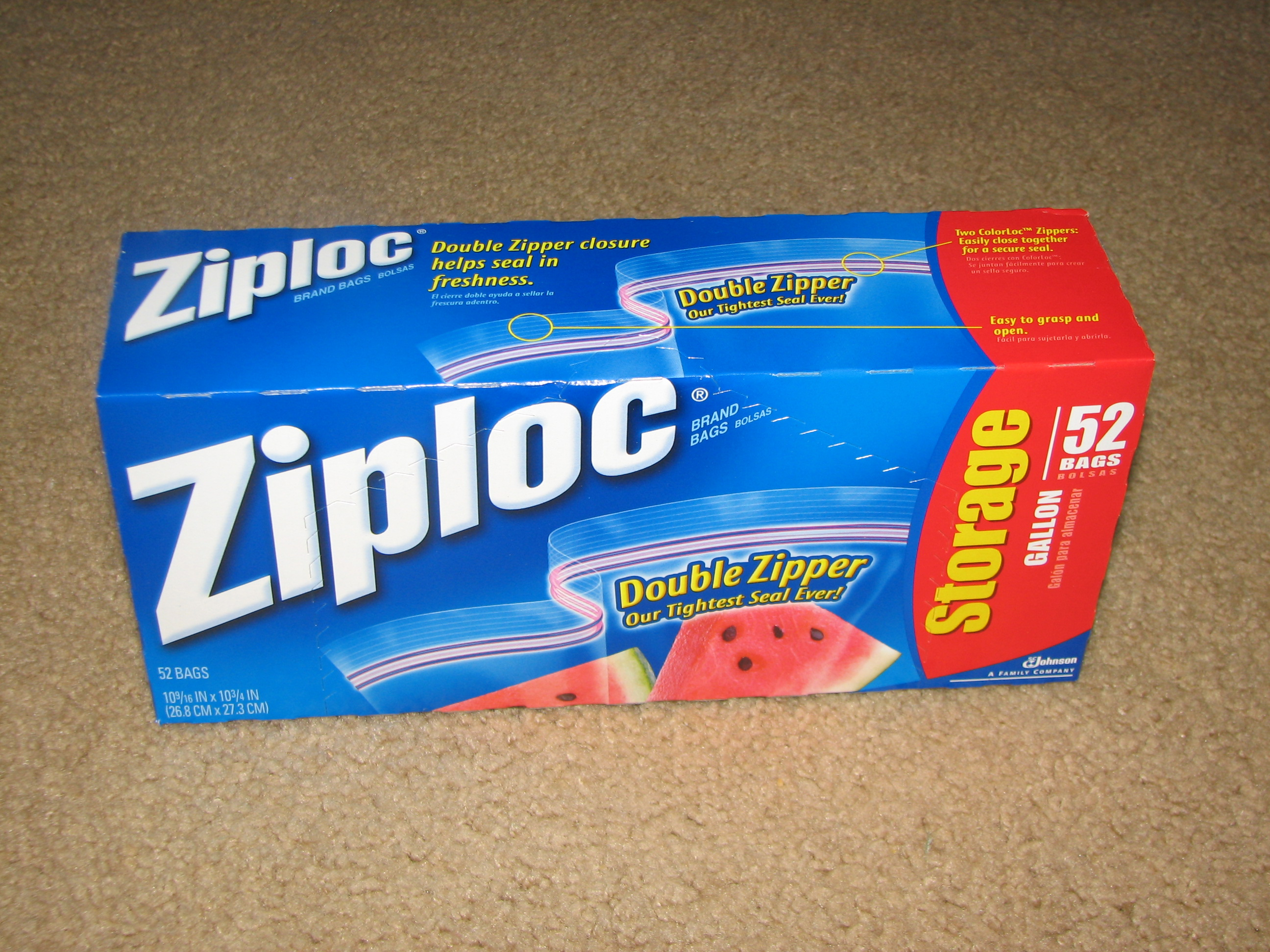
Box of 1 US gallon (3.7 L) Ziploc bags

At that time, plastic bags were being produced in 25 countries at a line speed of 30 feet per minute, but none were being sold to consumers, because they were too expensive to produce. Dow assigned one of their inventors, R. Douglas Behr, to develop a high-speed, efficient process. Having little prior experience in plastics, the task was daunting for Behr, but he surpassed everyone in the world within a year. As he improved the process and increased line speeds to 60, then 90, then 150 and finally 300 feet per minute in 1972, he was forced to design new equipment. Some were patented and some were kept as trade secrets by Dow. Eventually, other research and production personnel, such as lab technician William Shrum and others, contributed to the process development, but Behr continued to be the leading researcher until he retired in 1993 as a senior associate scientist. At that time the research building was "Dedicated in Recognition of the Distinguished Career of R. Douglas Behr".

In 1978, Minigrip was acquired by Signode, Inc. and became a subsidiary of that company. In 1986, Signode and Dow formed a company, namely Zippak, to develop zipper bags for food products. In 1987, Illinois Tool Works (ITW) acquired Signode, and Minigrip became a subsidiary of ITW. In 1991, ITW acquired Dow's interest in Zip-Pak, making Zip-Pak a fully owned subsidiary of ITW. Zip-Pak produces plastic zippers for the food packaging market. From the time of inception until today, Flexigrip/Minigrip/Zip-Pak/Dow/Dow Brands have obtained over 300 patents for plastic zippers, zipper bags, and methods and machinery for producing them. In 1997, Dow Chemical sold the rights of DowBrands, which included Ziploc, to S. C. Johnson & Son for between $1.3 and $1.7 billion.

Zip-Pak developed polypropylene-compatible zippers in 2003.

Among Ziploc and Zip-Pak's competitors are Presto, a subsidiary of Reynolds, and Pactiv Evergreen. In 1995, Hefty, one of Reynolds' holdings, introduced a sliding zipper bag.

== Products ==
Ziploc has expanded their products to more than just sandwich bags. Ziploc products have varied from freezer bags to Twist 'n Loc containers, the latter now discontinued. They have expandable bottom bags that stand on their own. The now-discontinued polypropylene Zip 'n Steam bags were used to cook food in a microwave oven. They also have had large bags, used for non-food storage, as big as 2 ft by 2.7 ft (0.61 m × 0.82 m). The now-discontinued flexible totes made by Ziploc were used for non-food storage and were as big as 22 US gallons (83 L). Recently, Ziploc has made an evolved line of sandwich and storage bags. All the bags in this line are made with 25% less plastic and are manufactured using wind power. The Ziploc Evolve sandwich bag was so successful that it was deemed the "Best in Show" at the 2010 Best New Product Awards in Canada.

== Advertising ==
S. C. Johnson & Son uses written, online, interactive, and televised commercial advertising for its Ziploc products. The advertisements run in: Brazil, Germany, Thailand, the United States, and many other countries. Ziploc's head of marketing is Scott Heim, who handles its multimillion-dollar advertisement campaigns. In 2002, S. C. Johnson launched its biggest campaign in history, a $50 million-plus campaign to launch a new line of disposable tableware/storage products to be marketed under the Ziploc brand name.

S. C. Johnson tends to focus its campaigns in the direction of television commercials. In the 2002 campaign, $35 million was devoted to a television campaign. In 2015, it created an advertising campaign with Tough Mudder to advertise to mothers via an obstacle course.

== Manufacturing ==
The manufacturing of Ziploc bags varies among different products. The ordinary Ziploc storage and freezer bag is made from polyethylene plastic.

== Competition ==
Ziploc faces strong competition from such competitors as Glad, Hefty, and many privately owned, generic, store brand plastic bags and containers. As Jules Rose, chairman of Sloan's Supermarkets Inc. in New York City, states: "This is a highly competitive market with a lot of players and unusually strong private label sales." In 1992, Ziploc was faced with sudden competition from the booming sales of arch-rival First Brands Corporation's Glad-Lock bag. Glad Lock bags jumped 13.1% in 12 weeks in the end of 1992, giving Glad-Lock an 18.4% share of the market compared to Ziploc's 43% share.
