= Glass Plus =

Cleaning product

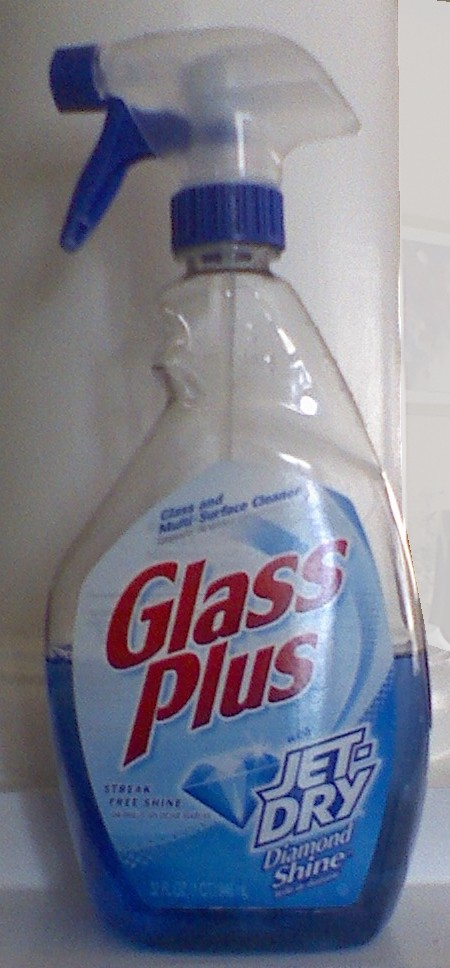
Glass Plus bottle

Glass Plus is a glass and multi-surface cleaner.

== Information ==
Glass Plus was introduced in 1975 and is currently manufactured by Reckitt Benckiser, who purchased the brand from S. C. Johnson. SC Johnson had purchased it from Dow Chemical. Dow Chemical acquired it through its 1986 purchase of Texize. This product does not contain the chemicals ammonia, alcohol, animal byproducts, bleach, or phosphates. It does include biodegradable cleaning ingredients along with water and aromas to add fragrance to the product. It will leave streaks if used on a warm surface or within direct sunlight. Glass Plus sells a 32-ounce or 64 ounce bottle of Multi-Surface cleaner and also Multi-Surface cleaner wipes in a 30 count container.

== Ingredients ==
Glass Plus includes the following ingredients and their purpose to make up its product:

- Water (Dilutent)
- Propylene Glycol Butyl Ether (Solvent)
- Methoxyisopropanol (Other)
- Propylene Glycol (Solvent)
- Ethanolamine (pH Adjuster)
- Sodium Laureth Sulfate (Anionic Surfactant)
- Alkyl polyglucoside (Nonionic Surfactant)
- Sodium Lauryl Sulfate (Anionic Surfactant)
- Fragrance (Frangrant)
- Acid Blue 182 (Colorant)
