= The Glad Products Company =

American company specializing in trash bags and plastic food storage containers

- Company type: Subsidiary
- Industry: Plastic ware
- Founded: 1963; 63 years ago
- Headquarters: Oakland, California, U.S.
- Products: plastic wrap food storage
- Parent: Clorox
- Website: glad.com

The Glad Products Company is an American company specializing in trash bags and plastic food storage containers.

The brand originally belonged to Union Carbide. In the United States, it was divested in 1985 to First Brands Corporation, which is now owned by the Clorox Company. In Australia, the brand was owned by other companies from 1988 until First Brands re-acquired it in 1997.

== History ==
=== Early history ===
Glad Wrap was invented in Australia by Union Carbide's research chemist, Douglas Lyons Ford, in the early 1960s, working in Union Carbide Australia's Rhodes plant in Sydney. The film was made from polyethylene with a stickifier added, produced as a continuous tube by the blown-film method, the tube then slit to make flat material that was put on rolls, and recently released in a newly designed "Easy Cut Dispenser". It was first introduced to the American market in 1963 in competition with Saran Wrap.

The Glad brand debuted in the United States in 1963 when Union Carbide launched Glad Wrap, a polyethylene film used as a food wrap. David Darroch was the Founder/CEO at Glad Products Company. Douglas G. Taylor was transferred that same year from the Union Carbide facility in Pittsburgh, Pennsylvania, to spearhead the Glad Wrap project.

Glad Wrap and Glad Bags were introduced in Australia in 1966; Glad was the first to introduce cling-type wrap to the Australian market.

In Australia, in order to promote the product, a competition was run in The Australian Women's Weekly asking readers to write in with suggested uses for the product. The winner of the competition was Lady Gwynnedd Casey, the wife of Lord Casey, the then governor-general of Australia, who suggested it could be used to cover the hors d'oeuvres before guests arrived at her garden party. Second prize went to a woman from western Sydney, who suggested it could be used to wrap up different kinds of buttons in her sewing kit to keep them separate from one another.

Union Carbide purchased the Brisbane company OSO, and in 1968 launched the OSO brand in competition with its own Glad brand. The OSO brand was made to be cheaper than, and inferior to, the Glad brand.

Taylor headed sales and marketing for Glad products until he retired from Union Carbide in 1985, as Senior Vice President of the Home and Automotive Products division as well as the head of STP Brands. His contributions to Union Carbide and his pivotal role in the sale of the Home and Automotive Products division demonstrate his significance within the company's history. He died in Hilton Head, South Carolina on August 13, 1996.

=== Later history ===
In the United States, the brand was divested in 1985 to First Brands Corporation, which also owned Eveready and Energizer batteries, Simoniz, and Prestone. In 1998, First Brands Corporation was acquired by Clorox.

In Australia, the Glad brand was acquired by Industrial Equity Limited in 1988, and then was floated as part of National Foods in 1991. In 1997, First Brands acquired the Glad brand from National Foods, thus consolidating worldwide ownership of the brand. Clorox took over ownership of Glad in Australia in 1998 as part of its acquisition of First Brands.

== Marketing ==
The Man from Glad is the Glad company's spokesman featured in many of their advertisements. He is an older gentleman with white hair and is always dressed in a white suit. In the 1960s, he was known as the "Man from Glad", and was summoned to various households in order to save housewives from their domestically challenged spouses. He wore a trenchcoat and would arrive in a wild variety of spy type contraptions (such as a jet pack or gyroglider), in the style of The Man from U.N.C.L.E and Mission: Impossible. He has been portrayed by several actors over the years, most famously Tom Bosley. The trash bags' slogans were "Why Take Chances, Get Glad!" and "Don't get mad! Get Glad!"

In 2006, following Hurricane Katrina, Glad became the first official sponsor of Mardi Gras in New Orleans. In addition to its significant program commitment, Glad worked with the City of New Orleans Department of Sanitation in the carnival's sanitation maintenance and clean-up efforts, which would otherwise have mounted a considerable expense for the municipality. Glad also was a major sponsor of the 2007 Mardi Gras.

== See also ==
- Million Dollar Mystery
