= Virginia–Highland commercial districts =

The Atlanta neighborhood of Virginia–Highland is one of many intown Atlanta neighborhoods characterized by commercial space of two sorts:

- groups of small commercial units clustered where the streetcars used to stop (e.g. N. Highland Ave. at St. Charles and Virginia)
- commercial space in former warehouses and industrial buildings, especially, but not exclusively, along the BeltLine (e.g. Amsterdam Walk and Ponce de Leon Place)

== Virginia and North Highland ==
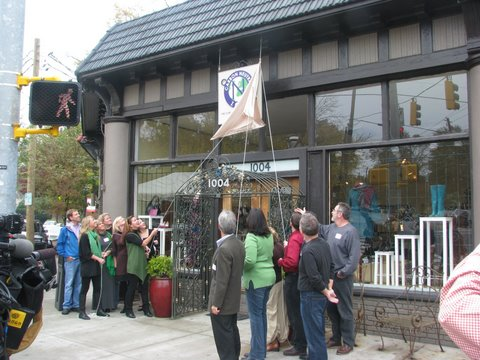
Virginia and N. Highland commercial node

The retail node at the corner of North Highland and Virginia is the neighborhood's namesake and main shopping and dining area. It has been well known since the 1990s for its restaurants. Atlanta institution Murphy's is located at the southwest corner. Such is Virginia Highland's fame that Jeff Fuqua, developer of the 600,000 square feet (56,000 m^{2}) Town Brookhaven complex in Brookhaven, described his effort to attract "local, chef-driven" restaurants to Town Brookhaven, and said that he wanted his complex to be a "Virginia Highland North". As of 2011, gourmet food trucks gather every Wednesday night at the corner of N. Highland Ave. and Briarcliff Place.

The "Corner Virginia–Highland" shops on the northwest corner were developed in 1925, renovated in the 1980s and are currently owned by The Meddin Company. In 2009, the property became the first carbon-neutral zone in the U.S., through cooperative work with Verus Carbon Neutral and the Chicago Climate Exchange.

== St. Charles and North Highland ==
Near the corner of St. Charles and N. Highland are numerous restaurants, pubs, and other businesses including:

- the Hilan Theatre (1932)
- Atkins Park Tavern (1922)
- Belly, a delicatessen, formerly the Atkins Park Pharmacy (1914), later Fleeman's Pharmacy
- Blind Willie's, a blues bar named after Blind Willie McTell. Regular performers include Sandra Hall and Francine Reed

== Amsterdam and North Highland ==
At the northwest corner of Amsterdam Ave. and North Highland Ave. is a complex of restaurants and shops built partially in old industrial space and sharing a parking lot, including the U.S. Post Office, San Francisco Coffee Roasting Company, Highland Pet Supply and restaurants Mali (Thai), DBA Barbeque, and the Original El Taco.

== Amsterdam Walk ==
At the far west end of Amsterdam Ave. between Monroe Ave. and the Belt Line is Amsterdam Walk, over 25 businesses in old warehouse space adjacent to the BeltLine and Piedmont Park. There is a large gym, bars, nightclubs, and specialty retailers selling furniture, jewelry, clothing, floral design, antiques, baked goods, cooking accessories, rugs and more.

The complex was originally part of the Campbell Coal Company warehouse. (Another part of the Campbell complex used to house The Cove nightclub and has now been razed and is being developed as the Piedmont Gardens section of Piedmont Park.) It later became the Thoben Elrod appliance depot, which caught on fire in 1964 with losses of $646,000. In the 1990s it opened as the Midtown Outlets, renamed in the early 2000s as Amsterdam Walk.

== Ponce de Leon Avenue ==
Ponce de Leon Avenue, which forms the southern border of Virginia Highland is also a major commercial artery, some parts of which still show the area's former decline. In June 2011, Jamestown Properties bought City Hall East (the former Sears building), on Ponce at the BeltLine, technically in the Old Fourth Ward. They plan its conversion to Ponce City Market, a retail, culinary, office and residential complex of regional significance, which promises to give a huge boost to commercial activity on Ponce.

Ponce de Leon Avenue in the City of Atlanta is included in the Ponce/Moreland Corridors Plan as part of the city's comprehensive development plan. As of April 2011, the Georgia Department of Transportation has decided to begin the design of safety improvements for pedestrians on the two-mile stretch of Ponce between Piedmont and N. Highland/Moreland. Changes proposed include the conversion of an eastbound traffic lane into a two-way left turn lane. The land would include intermittent islands and "HAWK" pedestrian crossing signals at selected crosswalks where no traffic signals currently exist.

== Other commercial districts ==
- There is a small commercial district at Virginia Ave. and Rosedale Drive
- Backing up to the BeltLine, Ponce de Leon Place, just north of Ponce de Leon Blvd., has old warehouse space housing a gym, fitness studio, Spot doggie day care and boarding, offices, and the huge Paris on Ponce antique emporium.

== Strip malls ==
Just across the BeltLine from the western border of Virginia–Highland are two major strip malls, adjacent to each other and stretching half a mile along the old rail line. Midtown Place opened in 2000 on the site of the old Atlanta Crackers baseball field (Ponce de Leon Park, or Spillers Park) and is accessed from Ponce de Leon Ave. just across from City Hall East. It includes a Home Depot, Whole Foods, and a PetSmart. Midtown Promenade is accessed from Monroe and 8th, or from Virginia Ave. just east of Monroe, and has a Trader Joe's supermarket, an art film cinema multiplex. and numerous restaurants and other businesses.

== Ponce City Market ==
In July 2011, the Jamestown property development company acquired City Hall East (the former Sears building) located where Ponce de Leon Avenue crosses the BeltLine, immediately adjacent to Virginia Highland. Jamestown plans to develop the building into Ponce City Market, with office, retail and residential space. It is to include a nationally significant gourmet food hall, which Jamestown compares to Chelsea Market in New York City, which Jamestown developed, or also to Seattle's Pike Place Market and San Francisco's Ferry Building.

It is hoped that this significant development will anchor the area of the four neighborhoods (Virginia Highland, Midtown, the Old Fourth Ward and Poncey–Highland) that meet at the property's edge.
