= James M. Henderson =

Advertising business executive

- Born: March 28, 1921; Atlanta, Georgia, U.S.
- Died: October 31, 1995 (aged 74)
- Education: Clemson University, University of Denver
- Known for: Founding Henderson Agency
- Political party: Republican
- Spouse: Donna Baade
- Children: 3
- Relatives: Jim DeMint (son-in-law)
- Military career
- Branch: United States Army
- Wars: World War II

James Marvin Henderson (March 28, 1921 – October 31, 1995) was the founder of the Henderson Agency.

Henderson founded the eponymous advertising agency in 1946. The agency was described by The New York Times as "one of the bigger agencies in the Southeast."

In 1969, Henderson took a one-year leave of absence from his advertising agency to serve as Special Assistant to the Postmaster General for Public Information, returning February 1970. In 1970, he was the Republican nominee for lieutenant governor of South Carolina. Henderson was elected secretary-treasurer of American Association of Advertising Agencies, "the most prestigious organization in its field" in 1971.

In 1974, his life story to that point was described by a New York Times writer as a "slightly cracker-barrel rags-to-riches saga."

He retired from the Henderson Agency in 1986 at the age of 65. Twenty years later, the headline "A South Carolina Agency Closes Its Doors" told about the end of what The New York Times called Henderson Advertising.

A regional obituary noted that Henderson was "known for putting Greenville on the national advertising map" because it was "in 1980 ... the first ad agency outside of Chicago or New York to be named Advertising Agency of the Year by Advertising Age magazine."

Party political offices
Vacant Title last held by Richard Howell Gleaves	Republican nominee for Lieutenant Governor of South Carolina; 1970	Succeeded by Carroll A. Campbell Jr.
