= Dipropylene glycol =

Names
- IUPAC names 4-Oxa-2,6-heptandiol and 4-Oxa-1,7-heptandiol
- Other names 1,1'-Oxybis(1-propanol) and 1,1'-Oxybis(2-propanol)

Identifiers
CAS Number	25265-71-8
3D model (JSmol)	Interactive image; 4-oxa-2,6-heptandiol: Interactive image
ChemSpider	5020642
ECHA InfoCard	100.042.504
EC Number	219-251-4
PubChem CID	32857
UNII	E107L85C40
CompTox Dashboard (EPA)	DTXSID0027856
- InChI: InChI=1S/2C6H14O3/c1-5(7)3-9-4-6(2)8;1-3-5(7)9-6(8)4-2/h2*5-8H,3-4H2,1-2H3 Key: ZWHXRCBKXVJADE-UHFFFAOYSA-N; InChI=1/2C6H14O3/c1-5(7)3-9-4-6(2)8;1-3-5(7)9-6(8)4-2/h2*5-8H,3-4H2,1-2H3 Key: ZWHXRCBKXVJADE-UHFFFAOYAU; 4-oxa-2,6-heptandiol: InChI=1S/C6H14O3/c1-3-5(7)9-6(8)4-2/h5-8H,3-4H2,1-2H3 Key: QYSXYAURTRCDJU-UHFFFAOYSA-N
- SMILES: OCCCOCCCO; 4-oxa-2,6-heptandiol: CC(O)COCC(C)O

Properties
Chemical formula	C_{6}H_{14}O_{3}
Molar mass	134.173 g/mol
Appearance	colorless liquid
Density	1.0206 g/cm^{3} at 20 °C
Boiling point	230.5 °C (446.9 °F; 503.6 K)
Solubility in water	Miscible
Solubility	Soluble in ethanol

Hazards
NFPA 704 (fire diamond)	1 1 0
Flash point	121 °C (250 °F; 394 K)
Autoignition temperature	310 °C (590 °F; 583 K)
Safety data sheet (SDS)	SIRI.org

Related compounds
Related compounds	Ethylene glycol Propylene glycol
- Except where otherwise noted, data are given for materials in their standard state (at 25 °C [77 °F], 100 kPa). verify (what is ?) Infobox references

Dipropylene glycol is a mixture of three isomeric chemical compounds, 4-oxa-2,6-heptandiol, 2-(2-hydroxy-propoxy)-propan-1-ol, and 2-(2-hydroxy-1-methyl-ethoxy)-propan-1-ol. It is a colorless, nearly odorless liquid with a high boiling point and low toxicity.

== Uses ==
Dipropylene glycol finds many uses as a plasticizer, an intermediate in industrial chemical reactions, as a polymerization initiator or monomer, and as a solvent. Its low toxicity and solvent properties make it an ideal additive for perfumes and skin and hair care products. It is also a common ingredient in commercial fog fluid, used in entertainment industry fog machines.
