= Pledge (brand) =

Cleaning product made by S. C. Johnson & Son

- Product type: Cleaning product
- Current owner: S. C. Johnson & Son
- Introduced: 1958
- Tagline: Keeping your furniture clean and beautiful
- Website: www.pledge.com

Pledge is an American cleaning product made by S. C. Johnson & Son. First sold in 1958, it is used to help dust and clean. Pledge is known as Pliz in France, and Blem in Argentina. In several countries, it is sold as Pronto.

== Products ==
- Lemon (odor only) Clean Furniture Spray
- Wipes
- Extra Moisturizing Furniture Spray
- Dust & Allergen Furniture Spray
- Specialty Surfaces Furniture Spray
- Multi Surface Everyday Cleaner / Surfaces Pledge cleans well:
  - Sealed wood and engineered wood
  - Laminate
  - Sealed granite, sealed marble, and sealed quartz
  - Glass and mirrors
  - Stainless steel, chrome, brass, copper, and aluminum
  - Plastic
  - Leather and man-made leather
  - Electronics Surfaces to avoid:
  - Unsealed wood, marble, or granite
- Multi Surface Antibacterial Everyday Cleaner
- Multi Surface Everyday Wipes
- Multi Surface Everyday Cleaner 99% Natural
- Revitalizing Oil
- Pet Hair Fabric Sweeper
- Multi Surface Duster
- Dust & Allergen Dry Cloths
- 4-in-1 Wood Floor Cleaner
- Wood Floor Concentrated Cleaner with Almond Oil
- Wood Floor Finish With Future Shine
- Clean & Shine Multi Surface Floor Cleaner
- 4-in-1 tile & Vinyl Floor Cleaner
- Tile & Vinyl Floor Finish with Future Shine
- SC Johnson One Step No Buff Wax
- SC Johnson Paste Wax
- Pronto Liquid Wax
- Wipe & Shine Liquid Polish

== See also ==
- Swiffer
