= Saran (plastic) =

Polyethylene food wrap

- Product type: Plastic wrap
- Current owner: S. C. Johnson & Son
- Country: United States
- Introduced: 1949; 77 years ago
- Previous owners: Dow Chemical Company

Saran is the trade name of a thin plastic film used for keeping food fresh by sealing. The compound polyvinylidene chloride (PVDC) was discovered in 1933 by researchers from the Dow Chemical Company and registered in 1940. It was acquired by S.C. Johnson & Son, Inc. in 1998 and the formulation changed to a less effective polyethylene (PE) in 2004 due to chlorine content. As a food wrap, the principal advantages of polyvinylidene chloride, compared to other plastics, are its ability to adhere to itself and its very low permeability to water vapor, flavor and aroma molecules, and oxygen. This oxygen barrier prevents food spoilage, while the film barrier to flavor and aroma molecules helps food retain its flavor and aroma.

== History ==
Polyvinylidene chloride wrap

Byproduct resin 1.1 dichloroethyl, a monomer of Polyvinylidene chloride (PVDC) was discovered at Dow Chemical Company (Michigan, United States) in 1933 when a lab worker, Ralph Wiley, was having trouble washing beakers used in his process of developing a dry-cleaning product, perchloroethylene.

It was waterproof, strong and versatile; it could be rolled, forged, drawn, welded, stamped and blown. It was initially developed into a product when a division of General Motors requested a flexible film to prevent corrosion on machine guns shipped overseas. It became the preferred packing material for anything that needed protection from the salt and moisture. Dow trademarked "Saran" in 1940, but the company did not immediately develop the product commercially.

In 1942, fused layers of original-specification PVDC were used to make woven mesh ventilating insoles for newly developed jungle or tropical combat boots made of rubber and canvas. These insoles were tested by experimental Army units in jungle exercises in Panama, Venezuela, and other countries, where they were found to increase the flow of dry outside air to the insole and base of the foot, reducing blisters and tropical ulcers. The PVDC ventilating mesh insole was later adopted by the United States Army for standard issue in its M-1945 and M-1966 Jungle Boots.

In 1943, Ralph Wiley and his boss, John Reilly, both employed by Dow Chemical Company, finished the last requirements needed for the introduction of PVDC, which was formulated in 1939 and monofilaments extruded initially. They also eliminated its green hue and offensive odor.

A common folk etymology holds that "saran" was formed from John Reilly's wife's and daughter's names, Sarah and Ann Reilly. In fact, Dow researchers could not come up with sufficiently appealing names to market the product. Dow instead decided to use Firestone's name for plastic streetcar seats, and purchased the naming rights.

The key to production of the film was credited to Wilbur Stephenson who discovered "that the size and thickness of a freshly extruded tube of Saran could be controlled to produce a uniform thickness that could be blown by a trapped air bubble into a continuous film of remarkable clarity and uniformity."

After the war ended, Dow began producing and selling large rolls of the plastic to commercial businesses. Dow employees Carroll "Curly" Irons and Russ Ludwig began a side business by purchasing the spools and cutting them into 12" wide, 25' lengths and marketing it as "cling wrap" in 1947. When its popularity reached Charles J. Strosacker, he convinced them to sell their venture to Dow in 1948 and the following year, Dow marketed a retail version of the thin, clingy plastic wrap trademarked Saran Wrap that was sold in rolls and used primarily for wrapping food. It quickly became popular for preserving food items stored in the refrigerator.

After the end of the Vietnam War, the U.S. military phased out PVDC insoles in favor of Poron®, a microcellular urethane, for its jungle and combat boots. However, the British Army continues to use PVDC insoles in its combat boots, primarily because of its insulating properties.

Saran Wrap and other Dow consumer products were acquired by S. C. Johnson & Son in 1998.

== Formulation change to polyethylene ==
Today's Saran Wrap is no longer composed of PVDC in the United States, due to cost, processing difficulties, and health and environmental concerns with halogenated materials, and in 2004 was made from polyethylene. However, polyethylene has a higher oxygen permeability, which in turn affects food spoilage prevention. For example, at 23 °C (73 °F) and 95% relative humidity polyvinylidene chloride has an oxygen permeability of 0.6 cm^{3} μm m^{−2} d^{−1} kPa^{−1} while low-density polyethylene under the same conditions has an oxygen permeability of 2000 cm^{3} μm m^{−2} d^{−1} kPa^{−1}, or a factor of over 3,000 times more permeable. For that reason, packaging for the meat industry still may use PVDC-containing films, as a barrier layer.
