= Scrubbing Bubbles =

Brand of cleaning products

- Product type: Bathroom Cleaner
- Current owner: S. C. Johnson & Son
- Country: United States
- Introduced: 1968; 58 years ago (as Dow Bathroom Cleaner)
- Markets: North America
- Tagline: We work hard so you don't have to!
- Website: scrubbingbubbles.com

Scrubbing Bubbles is the brand name of a bathroom cleaner produced by S. C. Johnson & Son. The product was originally named Dow Bathroom Cleaner after the Dow Chemical Company, its manufacturer at the time. After some consumer product lines were sold to S.C. Johnson in 1997, the product had to be rebranded and took the name of the product's longtime "Scrubbing Bubbles" mascots (smiling anthropomorphic soap bubbles with brush bristles on their undersides creating a mass of suds).

== History ==
In the 1970s, the voice of the leader of the Scrubbing Bubbles in popular commercials for the product was Paul Winchell (best known as the voice of Tigger in Winnie the Pooh cartoons). The bubble leader returned with the name "Scrubby" in future commercials. The animation for the commercials was done by Tissa David, a female pioneer in animation. The ad campaign was created by the advertising agency of Della Femina Travisano and Partners.

In 1995, pranksters at MIT placed 3D replicas of the Scrubbing Bubbles characters on the outside of the windows of the school's Media Lab building to celebrate the lab's tenth anniversary.
