= Endust =

Endust dusting aid

Endust is an American brand of dusting aid produced by Nakoma Products. A dusting aid is sprayed on a dustcloth or dustmop, rather than directly on the furniture.

The brand was developed by O-Cedar, a division of Martin Marietta, in the 1950s; Drackett acquired O-Cedar from Martin Marietta in the 1960s. Originally, Endust consisted of odorless mineral spirits and 1,1,1-trichloroethane with a propellant blend of propane and isobutane. The Montreal Protocol targeted 1,1,1-trichloroethane as one of those compounds responsible for ozone depletion and banned its use beginning in 1996. Since then, the manufacture and use of 1,1,1-trichloroethane has been phased out throughout most of the world. Endust now contains mineral oil, petroleum distillates, aliphatic hydrocarbons, orange oil terpenes, and propellant.

Roger Blackwell Ph. D., of the Fisher College of Business says that Harry Drackett invented Endust. In the 1970s, however, the Drackett company offered a one-page company history indicating that they purchased the Endust product from a small company in Chicago.

The Federal Trade Commission allowed S. C. Johnson & Son to purchase Drackett in 1992, provided that they divested themselves of certain Drackett product lines within one year. Sara Lee bought Endust and Behold at that time while O-Cedar itself was divested to merge with Vining Industries. Sara Lee sold Endust and Behold to Nakoma Products in 2011.

In 2008, Endust released Endust Free, a fragrance free, hypoallergenic cleaning product that is asthma and allergy friendly.
