= S. C. Johnson & Son =

American multinational household goods company

S. C. Johnson & Son, Inc.
- Logo since 2018

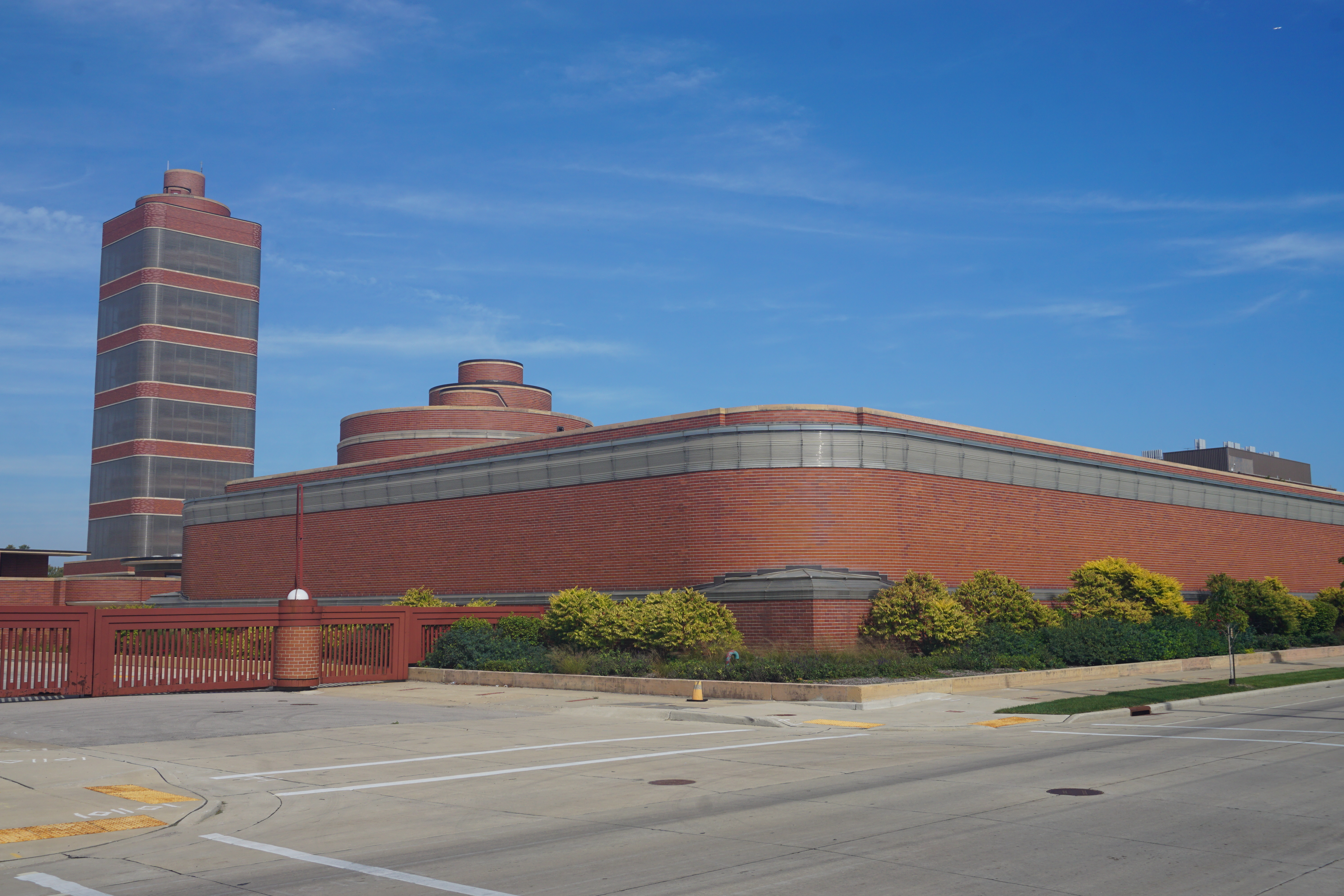
- Johnson Wax Headquarters in Racine, Wisconsin
- Trade name: S. C. Johnson
- Type: Private
- Industry: Consumer goods
- Founded: 1886; 140 years ago Racine, Wisconsin, U.S.
- Founder: Samuel Curtis Johnson Sr.
- Headquarters: Johnson Wax Headquarters; 1525 Howe Street, Racine, Wisconsin, United States
- Area served: Worldwide
- Key people: Herbert Fisk Johnson III (chairman & CEO)
- Brands: AllOut; Autan; Babyganics; Baygon; Bayfresh; Bayclin; Brise; Caldrea; Chemotox; Drano; Duck; Fantastik; Glade; Grand Prix; Janitor in a Drum; Kiwi; Mr Muscle; Mrs. Meyer's Clean Day; OFF!; Pledge; Raid; Saran; Scrubbing Bubbles; Shout; Swarfega; Toilet Duck; Windex; Ziploc
- Revenue: US$ 11.2 billion (2023)
- Owner: Johnson Family
- Number of employees: 13,000 (2019)
- Parent: S.C. Johnson
- Divisions: Family, inc.
- Website: scjohnson.com

Former SC Johnson logo (1999–2018)

S. C. Johnson & Son, Inc. (commonly referred to as S. C. Johnson: a Family Company) is an American multinational corporation and privately held manufacturer of household cleaning supplies and other consumer chemicals based in Racine, Wisconsin. In 2017, S. C. Johnson employed approximately 13,000 people and had estimated sales of $10 billion.

The company is owned by the Johnson family. H. Fisk Johnson, chairman and CEO since 2004, is the fifth generation of the Johnson family to lead the company.

== History ==
The company is one of the oldest family-owned businesses in the U.S., beginning in 1886 when Samuel Curtis Johnson purchased the parquet flooring division from the Racine Hardware Manufacturing Company and named the new business S. C. Johnson. The company's principal product at that time was parquet flooring, later adding other floor care products such as Johnson's Prepared Wax, Johnson's Dance Wax, and Johnson's Wood Dye.

Under Herbert Fisk Johnson Sr., the company expanded worldwide, establishing its first subsidiary in the United Kingdom in 1914. Giving his employees credit for a successful year, Herbert gave them $35,000 in 1917. In 1932, SC Johnson introduced Johnson's Glo-Coat. The success of Glo-Coat bolstered the company during the Great Depression. S. C. Johnson's line of wax-reliant products necessitated Herbert Fisk Johnson Jr.'s 1935 expedition to Fortaleza, Brazil, to find a direct sustainable source of wax.

From April 1935 until May 1950, the company was the sponsor for the Fibber McGee and Molly radio show, officially known as The Johnson Wax Program. During the 1950s, the company served as sponsor of the game show The Name's the Same. The company went on to co-sponsor Robert Montgomery Presents on NBC, and The Red Skelton Show on CBS.

In April 1939, the Frank Lloyd Wright–designed SC Johnson Administration Building opened. Its addition, the Research Tower, opened in 1950. The SC Johnson Headquarters was designated a National Historic Landmark in 1974.

The launch of Raid House & Garden Bug Killer in 1955 marked the company's first major departure away from wax-based products. Within the next few years, Sam Johnson, fourth generation leader, introduced some of the company's best known brands: Glade, OFF!, and Pledge.

In April 2018, the company updated its tagline from "A Family Company", which began in 1998, to "A Family Company at Work for a Better World". According to the company, the updated tagline is "A reminder that SC Johnson holds itself to a higher standard."

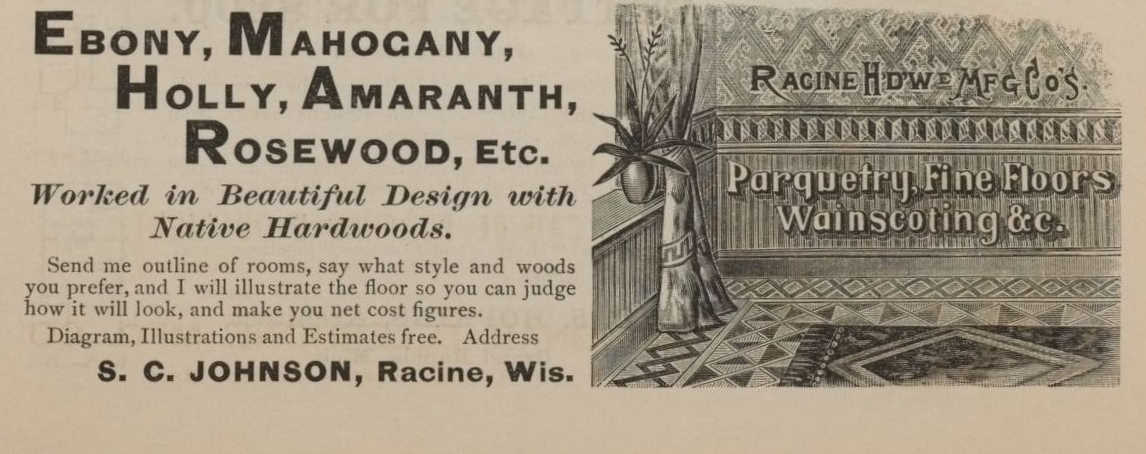
Racine Hardware Manufacturing Advertisement, "The Century Illustrated Monthly Magazine", November 1889

=== Acquisition milestones ===
- In 1992, the company bought Drackett, manufacturer of Windex, Drāno, and other specialty cleaning products.
- In 1998, S. C. Johnson expanded its roster of consumer brands when it purchased Dow Chemical's DowBrands division, which included Ziploc, Saran, Fantastik, and Scrubbing Bubbles.
- In 1999, the commercial cleaning products and systems division separated from Johnson Wax and became a stand-alone company called Johnson Wax Professional, later known as Diversey, Inc.
- In 2003, the company acquired four Bayer household chemical brands including Baygon, Bay Fresh, Bayclin, and Autan.
- In 2008, the company acquired Caldrea, Co., maker of household cleaning products including the Caldrea and Mrs. Meyers Clean Day brands.
- In 2011, the company acquired Kiwi shoe care brand from Sara Lee Corporation, thus also expanding its shoe care businesses after the deal.
- S. C. Johnson acquired Deb Group in 2015. A year later the company announced a new line of SC Johnson Professional products at the ISSA/INTERCLEAN conference in Chicago.
- In July 2016 the company signed an agreement to acquire Babyganics, a baby products company with skin care, oral care, sun care, insect repellent, diapers, and wipe products.
- In 2017 the company signed an agreement to acquire cleaning brands Method and Ecover.
- In December 2019, the company acquired the privately held Stasher company and its brand of reusable silicone food storage bags.

=== Ingredients ===
The company launched a website listing ingredients for their products sold in North America in 2009. Fragrance ingredients were added to the list in 2012. The company added the ingredients of its European products to the list in May 2016. In May 2017, SC Johnson disclosed a list of 368 potential skin allergens in its products.

== Brand names ==
Among the brands owned by S. C. Johnson & Son are the following:

=== Car care ===
- Grand Prix (in some markets, known as Kit, Tempo (Mexico), and Carnu)

=== Household cleaning and scent products ===
- Babyganics
- Bayclin (Indonesia and Latin America)
- Bayfresh (Southeast Asia)
- Beanpod Soy Candles
- Bon Ami (in Canada market)
- Caldrea
- Citresin (Czech Republic)
- Drano (in Japan markets, known as Pipe Unish)
- Ecover
- Fantastik
- Favor
- Finis (South and West Asia)
- Glade (in some markets, known as Gleid and Brise)
- Held (Switzerland)
- Janitor in a Drum
- Kiwi Dranex Kleen (in Malaysia, Philippines, Hong Kong, and Singapore markets, known as Kiwi Kleen)
- Lynn (Czech Republic)
- Lysoform (known as FamilyGuard in Asian markets; marketed as a new product in response to the COVID-19 pandemic)
- Method
- Mr Muscle (in Japan markets, known as Kabikiller)
- Temple/Tenpuru (Japan)
- Mrs. Meyer's Clean Day
- Nature's Source
- Oust
- Pledge (in some markets, known as Blem, Pliz, Bravo, Brilho, Pronto, Pride, and Glo-coat)
- Scrubbing Bubbles (formerly known as Dow Bathroom Cleaner before the sale to S. C. Johnson & Son)
- Shout
- Toilet Duck (in some markets, known as Canard WC, Bebek, Duck, WC Eend, WC Ente)
- Windex
- Armstrong (Floor Cleaner) in US markets.
- Johnsons Brite
- Plexon
- Freedom (Australia, Hong Kong, and New Zealand)
- Roma Coco (Brazil)
- Echo (South & Latin America)
- Optimum (Brazil)
- 00 Null Null WC (Germany)
- Brillo (some countries in Europe)
- Goddard's (Australia & New Zealand license)
- Wega (Swiss)
- 999 (Indonesia)
- All Joy (China)
- Stira E Ammira (in Hispanic markets, known as Toke and Klaro)
- Ceramicol (Argentina)
- Crew (Hongkong & Japan)
- Lifeguard (UK)
- J-80 Sanitizer (Indonesia)
- Shut (Japan)

=== Household food storage ===
- Saran Wrap (in Japanese market, this product licensed by Asahi Kasei)
- Stasher
- Ziploc (in Japanese market, this product licensed by Asahi Kasei)

=== Household pest control ===
- All Out (India)
- Autan
- Baygon
- Biolit (Czech Republic)
- Chemotox (Hungary)
- Diffusil (Czech Republic)
- Exposis (Brazil)
- Fuyí (Argentina)
- OFF! (known as Skinguard in Japan markets)
- Pyrel (France)
- Raid
- STEM
- Ridsect (Malaysia)
- Polil (Spain)
- F-Killer (S. Korea)
- Pest Rest (China)

=== Personal care ===
- Coola
- Oars + Alps
- Sun Bum

=== Shoe care ===
- Class
- Grison
- Kiwi
- Meltonian
- Salamander
- Tana
- Woly
- Golden Rooster (China)
- Colorfiel (Mexico)
- Red Bird (China)

== Divested brand names ==
Among the brands formerly owned by S. C. Johnson & Son are the following:

- Aveeno, a brand of personal care and skin care products. Sold to Johnson & Johnson in 1999.
- Bama, a brand of shoe care products. Acquired by the Serafin group of companies in 2018.
- Behold, a brand of furniture polish. Sold to Sara Lee Corporation (then Nakoma Products) in 1993.
- Curel, a brand of skin care products. Sold to Bausch & Lomb (then Kao Corporation) in 1993.
- Edge, a brand of shaving cream for men. Sold to Edgewell Personal Care (formerly Energizer Holdings) in 2009.
- Endust, a brand of dusting aid. Sold with Behold to Sara Lee Corporation (then Nakoma Products) in 1993.
- Fiberall, a brand of bulk laxatives. Sold to Ciba-Geigy (now Novartis, then Leosons Products) in 1988.
- Glass Plus, a brand of glass and multi-surface cleaners. Sold to Reckitt in 1998.
- O-Cedar, a brand of mops, brooms, and household accessories. Sold to Vining Industries (then Freudenberg Household Products) in 1993.
- Pouss-Mousse, a brand of hand soaps. Sold to Colgate-Palmolive in 1993. Now it operates as a sub-brand to Palmolive as of 2020.
- Renuzit, a brand of air fresheners. Sold to The Dial Corporation (now Henkel) in 1993.
- Rhuli Gel, a brand of anti-itch gel. Sold with Aveeno to Johnson & Johnson in 1999. It returned in 2017 and is now owned by Trifecta Pharmaceuticals USA.
- Skintimate, a brand of shaving cream for women. Sold with Edge to Edgewell Personal Care (formerly Energizer Holdings) in 2009.
- Soft Sense, a brand of skin care products. Sold with Curel to Bausch & Lomb (then Kao Corporation) in 1993. As of 2020, the product is now discontinued.
- Spray 'N Wash, a brand of stain removers. Sold with Glass Plus to Reckitt in 1998.
- Tahiti, a brand of shower gels. Sold with Pouss-Mousse to Colgate-Palmolive in 1993.
- Vivid, a brand of bleach. Sold with Glass Plus and Spray 'N Wash to Reckitt in 1998.
- Yes, a brand of laundry detergent. Sold with Glass Plus, Spray 'N Wash, and Vivid to Reckitt in 1998.

== Discontinued brand names ==
Among the brands discontinued by S. C. Johnson & Son and no longer available in their lineup are the following:

- Semerbak, a brand of bathroom freshener in Indonesia. Merged with Duck, while in Japan it still uses Shut for this product.
- AllerCare, a brand of dust mite products. Pulled from the U.S. market by S. C. Johnson & Son in 2000 due to complaints of asthma attacks and other dangerous symptoms.
- Astri, a brand of ironing aid in Indonesia and this product is local name from Stira E Ammira.
- Axi, a floor cleaner brand from Indonesia and Thailand. Merged with Mr. Muscle.
- Rain Barrel, a fabric softener brand from US. In Indonesia called Soft & Fresh.
- Jubilee, a kitchen wax brand from US. (Subsequently licensed and manufactured by Malco Products, Inc.)
- Fresh Soft Sense, a skincare brand from Indonesia. This product is domestic name for Soft Sense.
- Klear, in some countries known as Sol Plus and Klir. Merged with Pledge.
- Future, merged with Pledge while in Taiwan markets merged with Mr. Muscle.
- Kleen N' Fresh, a floor cleaner brand from Taiwan. Merged with Mr. Muscle.
- Glo, merged with Pledge.

== Environmental record ==
In 2011, S. C. Johnson & Son settled a lawsuit that alleged the company's Greenlist label misled consumers into believing the products were reviewed by a third party and given a seal of approval. The company agreed to an undisclosed sum and dropped the labeling of Greenlist on Windex.

S. C. Johnson & Son is the main sponsor of the Serra das Almas Private Natural Heritage Reserve in the states of Ceará and Piauí, Brazil. The reserve protects an area of the caatinga biome, including wild specimens of the carnauba palm tree (Copernicia prunifera), the source of carnauba wax.

On December 18, 2012, S. C. Johnson & Son began operation of two wind turbines at their largest manufacturing facility in Mount Pleasant, Wisconsin. The turbines, in addition to the gas reclamation system in place at a nearby landfill, are estimated to produce enough electricity to completely power the facility.

In 2017, S. C. Johnson purchased the ecological product Ecover and Method brands on undisclosed terms.

== Controversy ==
A RICO lawsuit by tax whistleblower Mike DeGuelle alleges that since 1997, S. C. Johnson & Son has taken advantage of audit errors and filed fraudulent tax returns, underpaying its taxes by millions of dollars. H. Fisk Johnson ordered an inquiry into the allegations, and told Tax Analysts that he learned "other details of the decisions they (the tax department) made that I didn't like. I didn't like what I heard." On December 15, 2011, the United States Court of Appeals for the Seventh Circuit, in Case No. 10-2172, ruled that DeGuelle had alleged a valid claim that the company's discharge of him was part of the tax fraud scheme. DeGuelle's claim was reviewed in the United States District Court for the Eastern District of Wisconsin with the Court ruling to dismiss the RICO lawsuit on the grounds of preclusion. The Court did not rule on SC Johnson's actions as they pertain to tax evasion, with Judge Stadtmueler stating that "the legality of SC Johnson's actions (and whether those actions did, in fact, occur) is of no importance to the Court's consideration of the defendant's motion for summary judgment." The Wisconsin Court of Appeals reviewed DeGuelle's case and affirmed an earlier ruling of the Racine County Circuit Court in favor of SC Johnson for defamation related to Deguelle's claims of tax evasion and breach of a confidentiality agreement.

S. C. Johnson & Son was one of 13 large consumer product companies who were together fined €948.9million by Autorité de la concurrence in France in 2016 for price-fixing on personal hygiene products. At the time, it was the largest single fine ever imposed by Autorité de la Concurrence.

In March 2022, S. C. Johnson & Son faced public scrutiny after its decision to continue to operate in Russia despite widespread sanctions in response to the Russian invasion of Ukraine. The company was reported to have stopped new investments and scaled back unspecified operations as of April 1, 2022.
