= Robert Shetterly (businessman) =

American businessman (1915–1997)

Robert Browne Shetterly
- Born: 1915; Corning, New York, U.S.
- Died: 1997 (aged 81–82); Cambridge, Massachusetts, U.S.
- Education: University of Rochester
- Occupation: Businessman
- Known for: Chairman and CEO of The Clorox Company
- Spouse: Phyllis
- Children: 3

Robert B. Shetterly (1915 – 1997) was an American businessman and philanthropist, known for serving as chairman and chief executive officer of The Clorox Company. Under Shetterly's leadership, Clorox grew from a small, single-product subsidiary of Procter & Gamble into a major independent, diversified company.

Shetterly was also involved in numerous philanthropic and civic causes in Oakland, California, most notably as the chairman of the board of trustees of Mills College and the founder of the East Oakland Youth Development Center.

== Early life ==
Robert B. Shetterly was born in 1915 in Corning, New York. He attended the University of Rochester, where he earned a bachelor's degree in 1936.

== Career ==
After graduation, Shetterly joined Procter & Gamble, where he focused on advertising. When the United States entered World War II, Shetterly was drafted into the U.S. Army Air Force. His first assignment was to teach radio operator mechanics. He then went to Officer Candidate School, where he became involved in a statistical control program run by Harvard Business School. After his officer training, he spent the rest of the war at Patterson Field in Dayton, Ohio, where he worked under Robert McNamara. He rejoined Procter & Gamble in Cincinnati after the war and was given responsibility for the marketing of Tide.

In 1952, Shetterly was named the manager of a new brand promotion division at Procter & Gamble. By 1961, he was named manager of the Food Products Division and a member of the corporate Administrative Committee. In 1965, he took over the management of Clorox, which was then a subsidiary that Procter & Gamble had acquired. Two years later, the Supreme Court ruled that Procter & Gamble's acquisition violated antitrust law and Clorox had to be spun off as an independent company. Shetterly was elevated to the company's chief executive in 1968, and was retained in that role when the company was divested from Procter & Gamble in 1969.

At the time that Clorox became independent, bleach was the company's only product. Shetterly immediately launched an effort to expand and diversify the company's portfolio, adding, among other brands, Liquid-Plumr and Clorox 2 in 1969, Formula 409 in 1970, Litter Green in 1971, Hidden Valley Ranch in 1972, and Kingsford in 1973. However, most of Shetterly's acquisitions ultimately failed to realize a consistent profit, and some were eventually sold.

In 1979, Shetterly was named chairman of the board of Clorox and remained in that position until 1982. He retired as the company's CEO in 1980.

== Community involvement ==
Shetterly was the driving force behind the establishment of the East Oakland Youth Development Center, for which he raised funds and donated an endowment. He also served as chairman of the organization's board, as president of the Economic Development Corporation of Oakland, chairman of the Oakland Council for Economic Development, and a board member of United Way of the Bay Area.

Shetterly became a trustee of Mills College in 1979 and served as chairman of the board from 1980 to 1986. A scholarship at the college is named for him.

== Family ==
Shetterly and his wife, Phyllis, had three sons, one of whom is the artist Robert Shetterly. His granddaughter is the author Caitlin Shetterly, and his granddaughter-in-law and Caitlin's mother is the author Margot Lee Shetterly.
