= Dunaway =

Dunaway is a surname. Notable people with the surname include:

- Craig Dunaway (born 1961), former professional American football tight end
- David King Dunaway (21st century), Pete Seeger's official biographer
- Dennis Dunaway (born 1946), bass guitarist
- Faye Dunaway (born 1941), Academy Award, Emmy Award and multi-Golden Globe Award-winning American actress
- George W. Dunaway (1922–2008), United States Army soldier
- Hollie Dunaway (born 1984), world-class female professional boxer
- Jim Dunaway (1941–2018), American football player
- Judson Dunaway (1890–1976), inventor, entrepreneur, and philanthropist
- Judy Dunaway (born 1964), composer, improvisor and conceptual artist
- Michele Dunaway (born 1965), best-selling American author
- Wilma Dunaway (born 1944), American academic

== See also ==
- Dunaway warning
