= Lupe Hernández hand sanitizer legend =

American nurse and claimed inventor of hand sanitiser

The Lupe Hernández hand sanitizer legend concerns an American nurse who, as a student in Bakersfield, California in 1966, invented the now-ubiquitous hand sanitizer gel. The claim is controversial as attempts to verify it by independent investigations at The Washington Post, the National Museum of American History and the Los Angeles Times have proven fruitless. Nevertheless, the story became "viral" during the 2020 COVID-19 pandemic and was widely reported as established fact and/or urban legend in the press.

== Story and investigations ==
The attribution to Hernández may have originated from a 2012 article in The Guardian entitled "Hand sanitizers: saved by the gel?", although the reporter, Laura Barton, presents the story as if it were already well-known in Bakersfield. The story goes that Hernández, a nursing student, realized that a gel with 60–65% alcohol could be used as a cleanser when soap and water were not easily available. Barton reported that Hernández had shared the idea with an "invention hotline" and she had at least attempted to patent the formula.

Subsequent attempts to verify the story or identify Hernández have proven unsuccessful. In 2020, in the midst of the COVID-19 pandemic and, subsequently, increased interest in hygiene, the Lemelson Center at the National Museum of American History in Washington, D.C., investigated the claim and was unable to find a relevant patent or any other evidence to support the story. Even Hernández's gender is uncertain: the Guardian story reported that Lupe (short for Guadalupe) was a woman, but some subsequent versions identify the inventor as a man. The Washington Post researched the story and was unable to verify it. Despite the lack of verifiable details, the story has been published as fact repeatedly, including in nursing textbooks.

The true origin of hand sanitizer gel is unclear. Alcohol-based hand sanitizers have been used for many years, but without a thickening agent the cleansers are messy and difficult to use. According to a 2020 Vanity Fair article, the first gel sanitizer appears to have been introduced in 1988 by American Gojo Industries, which eventually marketed the product to consumers as Purell.
