= Ty-D-Bol =

Brand of toilet cleaner

Ty D Bol
- Company type: Private
- Industry: Cleaning products
- Founded: 1958
- Founder: Harry O'Hare
- Headquarters: Saint Louis, Missouri, United States
- Key people: Bill Willert, Current Ty-D-Bol Man, Bryan Willert, Executive Vice President
- Website: tydbol.com

Ty-D-Bol is an American brand of toilet cleaner that was introduced in 1958. The company is best known for its nautical spokesperson, the Ty-D-Bol Man, who piloted a boat inside a toilet tank in TV commercials from 1968 to 1984.

The brand has changed owners repeatedly. It is currently owned by Willert Home Products of Saint Louis, Missouri, which acquired the brand in 2010 and currently manufactures Ty-D-Bol in South St. Louis.

== Description ==
Ty-D-Bol in its original format is a blue liquid cleanser/disinfectant released into a toilet tank from an automatic dispenser. Other variants, such as a solid tablet in a water-soluble wrapper, to be placed in the toilet's water tank, were introduced later.

== History ==
Ty-D-Bol was originally developed in 1958 by inventor Harry O'Hare.

In 1960, O’Hare sold Ty-D-Bol Chemical to its other executives for less than $100,000; independently he pursued an assortment of inventions - various detergents, a swimming pool chlorinator, a water softener. Revlon briefly owned the company (as well as a shoe polish maker and a minority stake in Schick) as part of a diversification attempt which it quickly abandoned.

In 1978, competing in-tank toilet cleaner 2000 Flushes was launched, initially as a jar of chlorine bleach crystals for the toilet tank.

In 1987, Sara Lee Household and Body Care purchased the Ty-D-Bol brand from near-bankrupt Papercraft Holdings, operating it as part of its Kiwi Brands division in Douglassville, Pennsylvania. After years of selling core assets to stay afloat, Papercraft folded in 1991.

In 1991, colour consultant James Mandle advised Ty-D-Bol's new owners to change its packaging from a light blue and green to a bold colour scheme with bright white letters on a dark background. In the 18 months that followed, sales of Ty-D-Bol jumped 40%.

A twelve-page booklet, "Ty-D-Bol Guide to Bathroom Cleaning - Spring Cleaning Edition", was offered free as a 1992 promotional gimmick to anyone who mailed a request and a self-addressed, stamped envelope. The 1992 "Ty-D-Bol Spring Cleaning Report" commissioned New York-based public opinion polling firm Research & Forecasts to ask 1,006 American adults “if they had the power to throw out what exists and start all over again", what would they choose? 49 percent picked the U.S. Congress, 23 percent the IRS tax code.

As a 1995 winning entry in the Washington Post Style Invitational (Week 121), Russell Beland of Fairfax, Virginia proposed "A useless product: New, lemon yellow Ty-D-Bol".

== Ty-D-Bol Man ==
Ty-D-Bol is best known for its nautical spokesperson, the Ty-D-Bol Man, who piloted a toilet tank-sized boat in TV commercials from 1968 to 1984. A number of different actors portrayed the characrter, including Dan Resin, Bob Kaliban, Fred Miltonberg, Larry Sprinkle, W. D. "Bill" Willert, and Mark Matheisen. The character was attired in a captain's hat, blazer, and turtleneck.

Resin, who died at age 79 in 2010, was Dr. Beeper in the film Caddyshack. Larry Sprinkle is a reporter for NBC affiliate in Charlotte, North Carolina. Mark Matheisen's film credits include roles in Forrest Gump, Plan B, A Walk in the Clouds, and Ocean Tribe.

Steve Levin of the Dallas Morning News once wrote: "He wore white slacks, a blue blazer, white shoes, a captain's hat, and he drove a motorboat—in your toilet tank. He sang calypso, threw tiny lemons, and was a favorite topic for Johnny Carson, Bob Hope, Carol Burnett, and George Carlin. He was also the driving force behind a generation of kids peeking into toilet tanks to find the little man in the boat. He was the first to introduce the automatic bowl cleaner and the first to turn the water in the bathroom blue. He was the Ty-D-Bol Man."

George Carlin said on one of his comedy albums that, "they're approving some pretty weird things, man. Like the guy in the toilet is pretty strange. Originally, it's a rowboat. Then he got a speedboat. Then he was on a raft with two calypso guy musicians and two bushels of lemons [singing] 'We put the lemon in the Ty-D-Bol for you.'"

In a 1997 syndicated column, Dave Barry chimed in with "Also, remember the Ty-D-Bol man? The guy who used to float around the toilet tank in a little boat? I hate to burst your bubble, but he wasn't real, either. He was just a professional actor who happened to be six inches tall. The REAL Ty-D-Bol man is only four inches tall and is always watching you via a little periscope. Try not to think about it."

According to Terry O'Reilly and Mike Tennant, the admen of CBC Radio’s The Age of Persuasion, "It's not easy to take seriously the marketing neverland where cartoon bears pitch toilet paper, where the Ty-D-Bol man patrols your toilet tank in a tiny rowboat and where a tin of Folgers coffee can heal a marriage. Yet the influence of marketing can't be ignored; worldwide, advertisers spend upwards of $600 billion a year trying to influence what you think, do and buy."
