= Vanish (toilet cleaner) =

Brand of toilet cleaner

Vanish is an American brand of toilet bowl cleaner produced by S. C. Johnson in North America. They obtained the brand through the purchase of The Drackett Company in 1992.

The Vanish name has since accompanied S. C. Johnson's Scrubbing Bubbles brand as a sub-brand.

== History ==
Drackett purchased the product from inventor Judson Dunaway of Dover, New Hampshire, who introduced Vanish in 1937 as a competitor to Sani-Flush, a toilet bowl cleaner made since 1911. The products were substantially the same. The active ingredient in crystal bowl cleaners is sodium bisulfate (also known as sodium hydrogen sulfate). Surfactants are added. The last Sani-Flush patent had expired in 1932.

Most other household cleaners are basic (alkaline) in nature.

In 1947, Hygienic Products sued Judson Dunaway on grounds of trademark infringement and unfair competition. Sani-Flush used a yellow 22-ounce can showing a woman pouring bowl cleaner into a toilet. Initially, Vanish sold their product in a white 22-ounce showing the bowl cleaner coming from the bottom of the "I". After World War II, Vanish advertising started to show a woman pouring the product into a toilet bowl, and then a hand, obviously female, pouring powder into a toilet bowl. Dunaway won on appeal.

With the withdrawal of sodium bisulfate toilet bowl crystals from the marketplace circa-2009, the Sani-Flush name and US trademark were abandoned; the Vanish brand remains in use, but only to identify other toilet cleaners (with differing formats and chemistry) from the same manufacturer. An in-tank toilet cleaner, intended to compete with 2000 Flushes and Clorox automatic, was introduced under the Vanish brand in 2000. Initial problems with in-tank cleansers damaging toilet flappers, allowing water to leak into the bowl, were addressed by adding new durability and marking requirements for flappers to the ASME A112.19.5 standard in 2005.

A Vanish Thick Liquid Disinfectant Bowl Cleaner sold for industrial and institutional use only is 9.25% hydrochloric acid by weight.

Vanish is now sold in the US under the Scrubbing Bubbles Vanish Continuous Clean Drop-Ins brand, reducing the Vanish name to a sub-brand.
