= Shetterly =

Shetterly is a surname. Notable people with the surname include:

- Caitlin Shetterly (born 1974), American writer and theatre director
- Lane Shetterly, American politician and lawyer
- Margot Lee Shetterly (born 1969), American non-fiction writer
- Robert Shetterly (businessman) (1915-1997), American businessman
- Robert Shetterly (born 1946), American artist
- Will Shetterly (born 1955), American writer of fantasy and science fiction
