= Harpic =

Brand of toilet cleaner by Reckitt

- Product type: Toilet cleaner
- Country: United Kingdom
- Website: reckitt.com

Harpic is the brand name of a toilet cleaner launched in the United Kingdom in 1932 by Reckitt and Sons (now Reckitt). It is currently available in Africa, the Middle East, South Asia, the Asia-Pacific, Europe, and the Americas. The toilet cleaning products marketed under the brand name include liquids, tablets, wipes, brush systems, toilet rim blocks, and in-cistern blocks.

It contains hydrochloric acid (10%) as the active ingredient, along with butyl oleylamine and other ingredients, in an aqueous solution.

== History ==
The original toilet cleaner was invented by Harry Pickup (hence the origin of the name Harpic), who was based in Roscoe Street, Scarborough, in North Yorkshire. He also invented Oxypic, which was a sealant used in cast iron heating systems, and patented the Lock & Lift circular manhole covers, which were used initially by the British Military. The company also produced the steel components used on the Mulberry harbours during the Normandy landings.

== Advertising ==
UK advertisements from the 1930s onwards used the slogan Cleans Round The Bend (for that reason, the name is occasionally used as slang for crazy – George Macdonald Fraser uses that sense in his autobiographical "Quartered Safe Out Here" when talking about an idiosyncratic British officer commanding an irregular unit. The 2008 Harpic advertisement, Send for the Experts, featured Tom Reynolds.

== Ingredients ==
Ingredients: Hydrochloric acid, Hydroxyethyl oleylamine, Cetyltrimethylammonium bromide, Ammonium chloride, Methyl salicylate, Butylated hydroxytoluene, Acid Blue 25, Acid red 88, Deionized Water.

== Products ==
As of 2010, the Harpic product range was:

- Harpic Bathroom Cleaner
- Harpic Power Plus
- Harpic Max Rim Block
- Harpic Hygienic
- Harpic All in 1
- Harpic Active Fresh Toilet Cleaner
- Harpic 100% Limescale Remover Toilet Cleaner
- Harpic Flushmatic
- Harpic 10X Max Clean (in Malaysia and other regions)
