= Fatty amine =

Amine attached to a hydrocarbon chain of eight or more carbon atoms in length

Pentadecylamine is an example of a fatty amine

In chemistry, a fatty amine is loosely defined as any amine possessing a mostly linear hydrocarbon chain of eight or more carbon atoms. They are typically prepared from the more abundant fatty acids, with vegetable or seed-oils being the ultimate starting material. As such they are often mixtures of chain lengths, ranging up to about C22. They can be classified as oleochemicals. Commercially important members include coco amine, oleylamine, tallow amine, and soya amine. These compounds and their derivatives are used as fabric softeners, froth flotation agents (purification of ores), corrosion inhibitors, lubricants and friction modifiers. They are also the basis for a variety of cosmetic formulations.

== Production and reactions ==
Fatty amines are commonly prepared from fatty acids; which are themselves obtained from natural sources, typically seed-oils. The overall reaction is sometimes referred to as the Nitrile Process and begins with a reaction between the fatty acid and ammonia at high temperature (>250 °C) and in the presence of a metal oxide catalyst (e.g., alumina or zinc oxide) to give the fatty nitrile.

RCOOH + NH_{3} → RC≡N + 2 H_{2}O

The fatty amine is obtained from these fatty nitriles by hydrogenation with any of a number of reagents, including Raney nickel or cobalt, and copper chromite catalysts. When conducted in the presence of excess ammonia the hydrogenation affords the primary amines.

RCN + 2 H_{2} → RCH_{2}NH_{2}

In the absence of ammonia, secondary and tertiary amines are produced.

2 RCN + 4 H_{2} → (RCH_{2})_{2}NH + NH_{3}
3 RCN + 6 H_{2} → (RCH_{2})_{3}N + 2 NH_{3}

=== Fatty secondary and tertiary amines ===
Alternatively, secondary and tertiary fatty amines can be generated by the reaction of fatty alcohols and fatty alkyl bromides with (di)alkylamines. For example 1-bromododecane reacts with dimethyl amine:

RBr + HNMe_{2} → RNMe_{2} + HBr

By reaction with tertiary amines, long-chain alkyl bromides give quaternary ammonium salts, which are used as phase transfer catalysts.

Secondary and tertiary amines may also be produced by the Leuckart reaction. This reaction effects N-methylation using formaldehyde with formic acid as the reductant. These tertiary amines are precursors to quaternary ammonium salts used for a variety of applications.

== Applications and derivatives ==
The main application of fatty amines is for the production of the corresponding quaternary ammonium salts, which are used as fabric softeners and hair conditioners (e.g. Behentrimonium chloride). Fatty amines are also used in froth flotation, for the beneficiation of various ores. The amines bind to the surfaces of certain minerals allowing them to be readily separated from those lacking the bound amine. They are also additives in the production of asphalt.

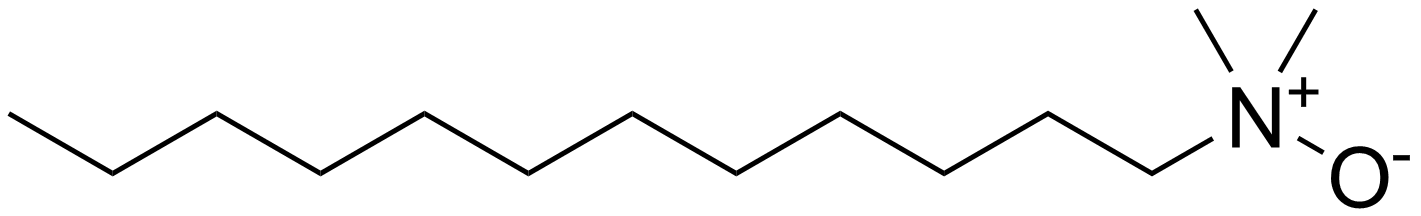
Lauryldimethylamine oxide, a fatty amine derivative, is a germicidal ingredient in many cosmetics.
