= Sani Flush =

American toilet cleaner brand

Sani-Flush was an American brand of crystal toilet bowl cleaner formerly produced by Reckitt Benckiser. Its main ingredient was sodium bisulfate; it also contained sodium carbonate as well as sodium lauryl sulfate, talc, sodium chloride, fragrance and dye.

When sodium bisulfate is mixed with water, a highly-corrosive acidic solution is produced, which dissolves accumulated minerals such as iron, magnesium and calcium from the bowl.

The product has been discontinued because of environmental concerns; by 2013 its last original US trademark was cancelled or allowed to expire.

== History ==
Sani-Flush was introduced by the Hygienic Products Company of Chicago, Illinois in 1911 as a toilet bowl cleaner; since 1922 it had also been promoted for flushing "rust, scale and sludge" from automobile radiators. Advertisements from the 1920s onward depicted a housewife in an apron using the product to disinfect the bowl and remove odors; it "cleans closet bowls without scouring" with "no drudgery whatsovever".

The brand was sold to American Home Products; that company's subsidiary Boyle-Midway was sold to Reckitt & Colman (now Reckitt Benckiser) in 1990. The primary direct competitor to Sani-Flush was Vanish, a brand of toilet cleaning crystals marketed in the US by Drackett, which was later acquired by the SC Johnson Company.

Widely stocked in grocery and hardware stores, the product was a well-known household name and occasionally mentioned in children's jokes like "If Santa gets stuck in your chimney, use Santa Flush" and the apocryphal advertising slogan "Sani-Flush, Sani-Flush, cleans your teeth without a brush. All you do is pour it on; one, two, three, your teeth are gone." Mixing Sani-Flush (an acid) with a chlorine bleach (hypochlorite) like Drāno or Liquid-Plumr can be deadly as it releases the poisonous gas chlorine. On April 8, 1964 a Winn-Dixie food store in St. Petersburg, Florida was evacuated and eleven people hospitalized when a combination of these two incompatible products was used to clean a floor.

Sani-Flush is mentioned several times in William S. Burroughs' novel Naked Lunch, where the product is used to "cut" (dilute) cocaine or where it is substituted for morphine by a pharmacist.

The original product quietly disappeared from store shelves circa-2009; the US trademark was cancelled in 2013. Unlike rival Vanish, whose mark now serves to market other formats of toilet cleaner from the same manufacturer, the Sani-Flush name in the US was simply abandoned. "Sani-Flush" and "Sani-Flush Puck" retain their registered trademark status in Canada, but refer to a different toilet cleaner.

== See also ==
- List of defunct consumer brands
