= Formula 409 =

Clorox brand cleaning product

- Product type: Cleanser
- Current owner: Clorox
- Country: United States
- Introduced: 1957; 69 years ago
- Markets: Worldwide
- Previous owners: Chemzol
- Website: formula409.com

Formula 409, also known as 409, is an American brand of home and industrial cleaning products. Individual products in the brand line include Formula 409 Multi-Surface Cleaner, Formula 409 Stone and Steel Cleaner, Formula 409 Carpet Spot & Stain Remover. Other products have included Formula 409 Glass and Surface Cleaner, and CloroxPro Formula 409 Cleaner Degreaser Disinfectant. First sold in 1957, the brand has been owned by Clorox since 1970.

== History ==
Formula 409 was invented in 1957 by Morris D. Rouff, whose Michigan company manufactured industrial cleaning supplies. Formula 409’s original application was as a commercial solvent and degreaser for industries that struggled with particularly difficult cleaning problems.

The inventor's son has stated that it was named for the birthday of the inventor's wife, Ruth, on April 9th (409). The company, however, claims that it was named as the 409th compound tested by the two young inventors. Other claimed origins for the name include 409 being the telephone area code where it was invented (area code 409, which serves southeastern Texas, was not introduced until 1983); the birthday of some other person, such as the inventor's daughter; or a reference to a powerful Chevrolet car engine used in the 1960s.

In 1960, Rouff sold Formula 409 to Chemzol, a New York firm, for an amount in the low six-figure range. In the mid-1960s, entrepreneur Wilson Harrell, along with longtime friend David Woodcock and television personality Art Linkletter, bought Formula 409. Harrell, Woodcock & Linkletter bought it for $30,000 and took it national. Linkletter also promoted the product in television commercials. The company eventually took Formula 409 to a 55 percent share of the spray-cleaner market, and six years later, Harrell, Woodcock & Linkletter sold the company to Clorox for $7 million.

In early 2020 during the onset of the COVID-19 pandemic, Formula 409 was one of the several products that was in high demand and became impossible to find in stores due to supplies running out.

== Advertising ==
During the period when Art Linkletter was a part-owner of the Formula 409 brand, he was the commercial spokesperson.

Throughout the early 1970s, commercials featured Betty Boop.

In the late 1990s to the early 2000s, a cover of The Beach Boys' 1962 song (surfin' safari) "409" was used. The song's title refers to the name of the Chevrolet engine.

One commercial from 2005 shows a fictional Formula 410. As a character hits the trigger, electricity shoots out instead of spray. The announcer says, "Because the world is not ready for Formula 410, there's Formula 409".

== In popular culture ==
Detroit rock group Electric Six released a song named for the product on their 2008 album Flashy. The song references how the product might be used to "clean your kitchen". The music video features band members using spray bottles of Formula 409 Glass and Surface Cleaner to clean the windows of the Lafayette Coney Island restaurant in downtown Detroit. The band Death Cab for Cutie's song 'What Sarah Said' mentions the product.

In the season 5 episode Mind's Eye of the TV-show The X-Files from 1998, a detective claims that Marty Glen (played by guest star Lili Taylor), a suspect and the Villain of the week of the episode, had been found "at the scene doing a Formula 409.", i.e. cleaning a bathroom that had been the crime scene of a murder. It is also the title of Green Day's song "409 in Your Coffeemaker", appearing on their 1990 EP Slappy.

== Ingredients ==
=== Formula 409 Multi-Surface Cleaners ===
==== Original Cleaner ====
- Water
- Lauramine Oxide
- Ethanolamine
- Alkyl C12-16 Dimethylbenzyl Ammonium Chloride
- Myristamine Oxide
- Tetrapotassium EDTA
- Ethanol
- Fragrance Ingredient (CAS number withheld)
- Myrcene

==== Lemon Fresh Cleaner ====
- Water
- Lauramine Oxide
- Ethanolamine
- Alkyl C12-16 Dimethylbenzyl Ammonium Chloride
- Myristamine Oxide
- Tetrapotassium EDTA
- Ethanol
- Polyoxyalkylene Substituted Chromophore (Yellow)
- Fragrance Ingredient (CAS number withheld)
- Limonene

=== Formula 409 Natural Stone and Steel Cleaner ===
- Water
- Ethanalomine
- Lauramine Oxide
- Tetrapotassium EDTA
- Myristamine Oxide
- Dipropylene Glycol
- Fragrance Ingredient (CAS number withheld)

=== Formula 409 Carpet Spot and Stain Remover ===
- Water
- Isobutane
- Sodium Dodecylbenzenesulfonate
- Sodium Xylene Sulfonate
- Propane
- Sodium Borate
- Acrylic Copolymer
- Sodium Benzoate
- Ammonium Hydroxide
- Sodium Metasilicate
- Fragrance Ingredient (CAS number withheld)
- Alpha-Isomethyl Ionone
- Linalool
- Diethyl Phthalate
