= YVC =

YVC may refer to:

- Yakima Valley College, a public college in Yakima, Washington, United States
- Youth Volunteer Corps, an American youth organization
- YVC, the IATA code for La Ronge (Barber Field) Airport, Saskatchewan, Canada
- A US Navy hull classification symbol: Catapult barge (YVC)
