= East Oakland Youth Development Center =

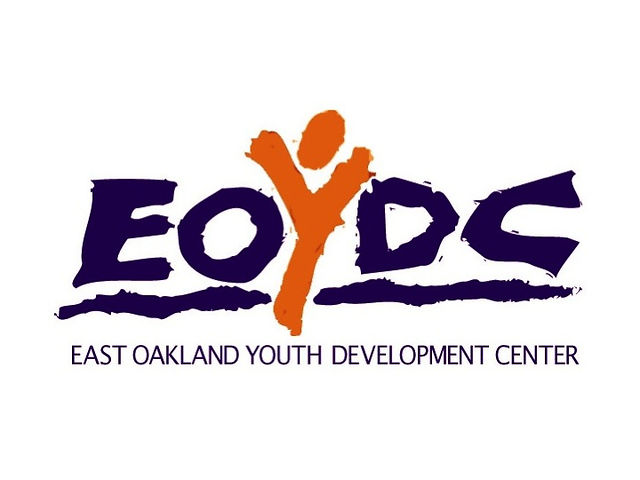
- Abbreviation: EOYDC
- Formation: 1978
- Founder: Robert B. Shetterly
- Headquarters: 8200 International, Blvd. Oakland, CA 94621
- Location: Oakland, California
- CEO: Selena Wilson
- Website: http://eoydc.org/

East Oakland Youth Development Center (EOYDC) is a 501(c)(3) non-profit organization in Oakland, California, United States. It opened in 1978.

EOYDC’s mission is to nurture the holistic development of youth from kindergarten into adulthood so that they can live a life of prosperity, integrity, and purpose.

== History ==
EOYDC was founded in 1973 and opened its doors in 1978 by Robert B. Shetterly, then-CEO of Clorox. Although Shetterly was a prominent businessman and a long-time resident of Orinda, he also had ties in Oakland, and he encouraged a number of businesses to move to Oakland over other local cities. Clorox helped fund EOYDC in its early years and later on. Since it opened, it began providing free programs five days a week for people in the Elmhurst District of East Oakland. EOYDC’s longest serving Executive Director/CEO was Regina Jackson, who led the organization from 1994-2021. Regina Jackson was succeeded by Selena Wilson, the first alumni of the organization to serve in this role.

== Mission ==
The mission of EOYDC is to nurture the holistic development of youth from kindergarten into adulthood so that they can live a life of prosperity, integrity, and purpose. Guided by their Theory of Change, EOYDC emphasizes five elements of success:

- Cultivate character development through the pillars of trustworthiness, respect, responsibility, fairness, caring, and community.
- Ensure that each young person is prepared for opportunities in academics, leadership, and employment.
- Promote access by exposing young people to opportunities for personal and professional advancement.
- Nurture socio-emotional development so that our young people cultivate self-awareness, self-management, and the relationship skills they need to be successful.
- Advance social justice by centering systematically marginalized experiences, affirming young people’s agency, and providing youth with the tools to better advocate for themselves.

== Programs ==
The four core programs of EOYDC are art, wellness, careers, and education.

- Arts: Providing opportunities for young people to engage in self-expression while fostering cultural pride and creative skill sets in the visual, performing, and immersive arts.
- Wellness: Facilitating the overall well-being of youth through exercise, nutrition, and emotional health supports.
- Careers: Providing career exploration opportunities, direct career-readiness training, paid internships, and job placement.
- Education: Teaching and exposing young people to ideas, concepts, and information to ensure they acquire the skills needed to learn and complete their formal education, through post-secondary.

== Funding and sponsors ==
EOYDC receives some government funding, while most funding comes from private grants and donors, and some from corporate grants and individuals. EOYDC hosts two major annual fundraising events: The Black Futures Ball scholarship fundraiser, held the first Saturday of August each year and the Lexus Champions for Charity Golf Tournament held each fall (typically in September or November).

== Notable alumni ==
- Jabari Brown, former NBA player
- Keyshia Cole, singer, songwriter, record producer, and television personality
- Mark Curry, actor and comedian
- Antonio Davis, former NBA player
- Keyondrei “Kiwi” Gardner, former Saudi Premier League basketball player
- Drew Gooden, NBA player
- Aaron Goodwin, sports agent
- Greg Foster, former NBA player, NBA assistant coach
- Damian Lillard, NBA player
- Jason Kidd, former NBA player, NBA head coach
- Kirk Morrison, former NFL player
- Gary Payton, former NBA player
- Leon Powe, former NBA player
- Brian Shaw, former NBA player, former NBA head coach
- D'Wayne Wiggins, musician, producer, and composer
- J.R. Reid, former NBA player
- Demetrius "Hook" Mitchell, former streetball player
- Davone Bess, former NFL player
