= 2000 Flushes =

Toilet cleaning product

- Current owner: WD-40 Company
- Country: United States
- Introduced: 1978; 48 years ago
- Previous owners: Flushco Inc. (1978-1983); Block Drug (1983-2001)
- Website: 2000flushesbrand.com

2000 Flushes is an automatic toilet cleaning product produced by the WD-40 Company. The toilet cleaner is dispensed from an in-tank package.

== History ==
2000 Flushes was created by Al Eisen, founder of New Jersey–based Flushco, Inc. According to the company, Eisen's wife asked him to clean the toilet; he hated the job and tried to find a better way. His initial experiment, a cup with chlorine weighted with rocks and installed in the toilet tank, worked well at keeping his toilet clean for months. The idea behind 2000 Flushes was born.

The first newspaper advertisements appeared in 1978; in March 1979 this was supplemented by simple broadcast advertising with the tagline If there's one job I hate, it's scrubbing the toilet.

The product was well-enough received in its initial US markets to represent a credible rival to Vanish, which held a dominant market position at the time with a Sani-Flush like crystal toilet bowl cleaner. Before 2000 Flushes could complete its national expansion westward, Vanish began disparaging advertising suggesting calcium hypochlorite toilet cleaners damaged plumbing. In fall 1981, a group of manufacturers led by Twinoak (which made "120 Day Automatic Toilet Bowl Cleaner" since 1965) obtained an out-of-court settlement against Drackett Company, maker of Vanish. As part of the undisclosed cash settlement, disparaging advertisements were withdrawn.

Block Drug purchased Flushco, acquiring "2000 Flushes" toilet bowl cleaner in 1983. Block distributed multiple versions of the product, such as "2000 Flushes Blue" and "2000 Flushes Powder Foam". It sold the brand as part of a larger 1998 corporate restructuring.

Al Eisen (as inventor of 2000 Flushes) made personal appearances in many early ads for the product, in which he holds up four fingers and boasts "It works up to four months!"

In October 1993, toilet fixture manufacturers reported rapid degradation of flush valve flappers; some new, water-saving toilets (introduced to meet a 1994 US federal water conservation deadline) were leaking within months of installation. The growing popularity of in-tank drop-in cleaning tablets quickly drew suspicion as many contain chlorine bleach; if a toilet is flushed infrequently, the amount of chlorine in the tank may build to problematic levels. The Metropolitan Water District of Southern California (MWD) began tests of flapper materials in 1994 to 1997. By 1998, flappers had been redesigned to withstand continuous immersion in 2000 Flushes or Clorox bowl cleaners, then the most popular products. A rival in-tank cleaner introduced by Vanish in 2000 caused problems until 2005, when new durability and marking requirements for flappers were added to the ASME A112.19.5 standard on "Flush Valves and Spuds for Water Closets, Urinals, and Tanks".

In 2001, San Diego–based WD-40 Company acquired Global Household Brands, a company founded in 1998 to acquire X-14, 2000 Flushes and Carpet Fresh.

2000 Flushes is now packaged as a solid tablet for in-tank use, like many of its rivals. There are multiple product versions and reformulations; some add a detergent, some add a concentrated bleach. In 2008, a disinfectant was added to "kill 99.9% of bacteria flush after flush" in an apparent response to competitive pressures; Ty-D-Bol has claimed to "kill 99.9% of toilet bowl germs with every flush" since 1994 and crystal bowl cleaners have made claims to "kill millions of germs" since Sani-Flush's 1911 introduction.

While toxicity varies between the differing 2000 Flushes formulations, most are not pet-safe.
