= In-tank toilet cleaning tablet =

Type of cleaning product

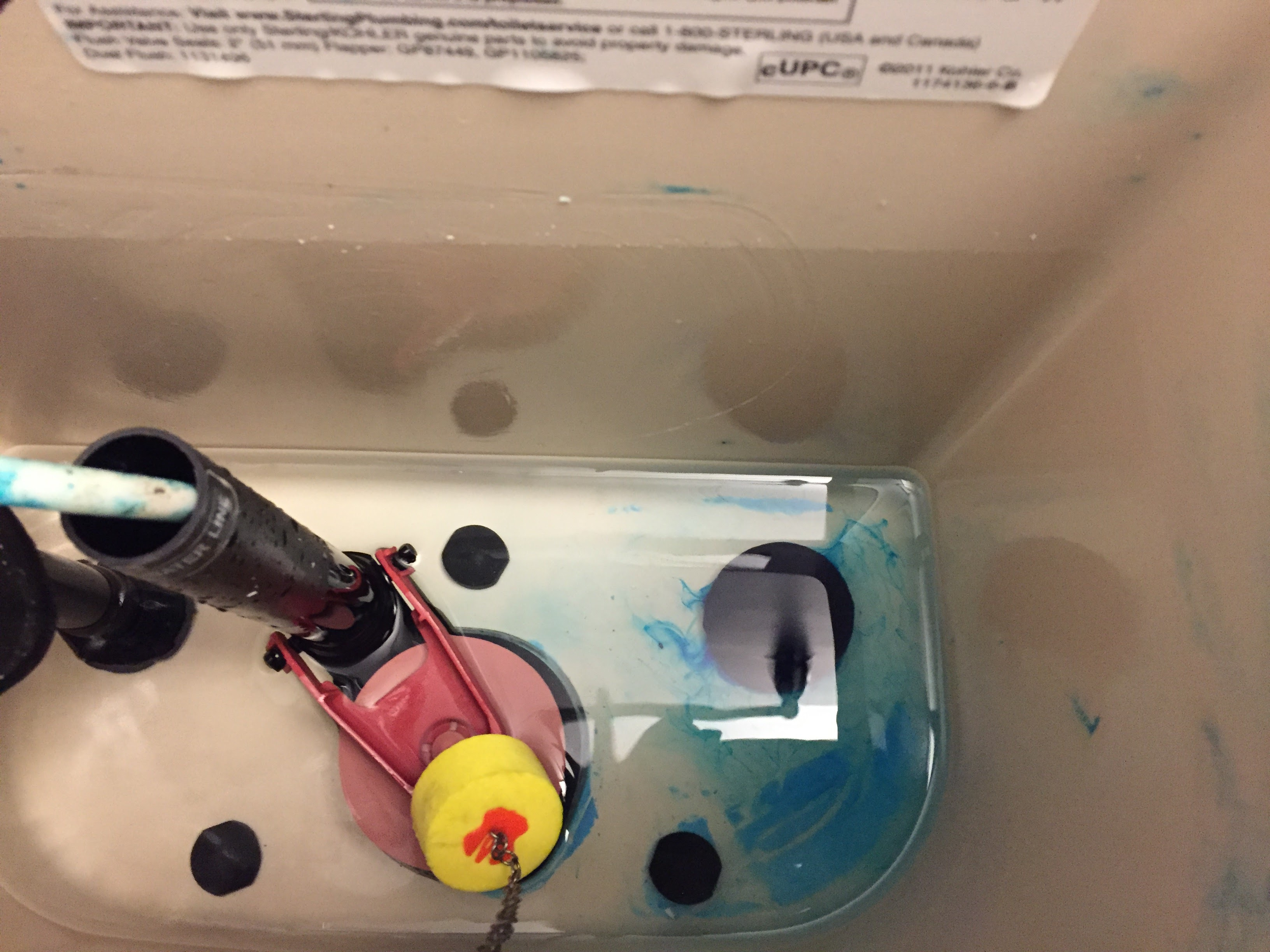
An in-tank toilet cleaning tablet placed in toilet tank

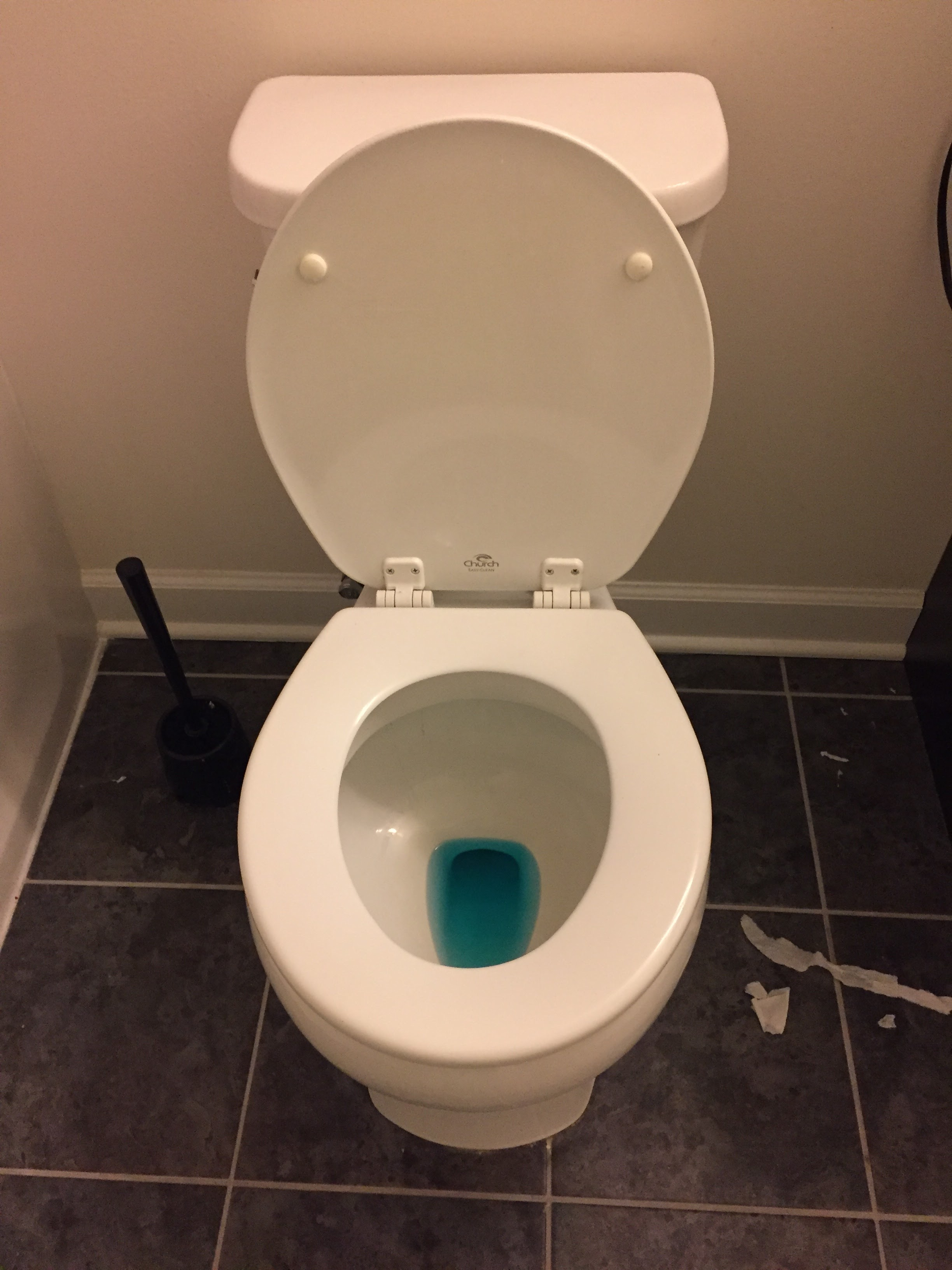
Blue toilet water from using in-tank toilet cleaner tablet

In-tank toilet cleaners (also known as toilet water tablets or drop-in toilet bowl cleaners) are tablets or cartridges that add chemicals to toilet tank water to reduce toilet bowl stains. They are commonly used to prevent toilet bowl stains from calcium, limescale, mold, etc. Most contain chlorine bleach as the main active ingredient, however, some may use other main active ingredients.

== History ==
In-tank toilet cleaners were originally invented by Flushco, Inc. in 1978, branded as 2000 Flushes (acquired and now owned by WD-40 Company).

Eventually, some other brands and companies such as S.C. Johnson Scrubbing Bubbles, Clorox, and Ty-D-Bol sold their own in-tank toilet cleaner tablets.

== View from professionals and plumbers ==
Many plumbers, manufacturers of toilets, and other professionals discouraged in-tank toilet cleaning products due to major disadvantages. A major complication that may occur includes bleach breaking down rubber gaskets and corroding steel parts. Another issue is the blue dye commonly used in in-tank cleaning tablets may cover up iron deposits.

Many manufacturers of toilets have discouraged the use of in-tank cleaners by voiding the warranties of toilets that are damaged from use of in-tank cleaners.

== See also ==
- Toilet cleaner
