= Bob Kaliban =

American actor

- Born: Robert Dean Kaliban; November 6, 1933; Lisbon, Iowa, U.S.
- Died: December 12, 2020 (aged 87); Healdsburg, California, U.S.
- Education: Loras College, RADA
- Occupations: Actor; musician
- Years active: 1960–2011

Robert Dean Kaliban (November 6, 1933 – December 12, 2020) was an American actor, singer, and musician who served as president of the New York branch of SAG-AFTRA. He also appeared in television, films and TV commercials as the "Ty-D-Bol Man”.

== Personal life and career ==
Kaliban was born on November 6, 1933, in Lisbon, Iowa. After attending Loras College in Dubuque, he moved to New York City in the 1950s where he began his career in the theater. Twice married, Kaliban briefly moved to London and gained a scholarship at Royal Academy of Dramatic Art. His first role on Broadway was in the musical, How to Succeed in Business Without Really Trying. He also appeared in Ben Franklin in Paris.

In 1968, Kaliban became president of the Screen Actors Guild. Regarding his role as SAG president, Kaliban stated: “We have been stripped of our dignity and believability as actors by every client who uses real people. The trend must turn back from real people to the real professional.”

Kaliban later appeared in local television commercials in the New York City area. Despite leaving SAG in 1994, he continued to have a “Trustee” status of the Pension Plan until his death.

Kaliban died on December 12, 2020 in California.

== Filmography ==
=== Film ===
Year(s)	Title	Character	Note	Ref
1978	If I Ever See You Again	Account Supervisor		
1979	Something Short of Paradise	George Pendleton		
1979	A Family Circus Christmas	Daddy		
1980	The Berenstain Bears Meet Bigpaw	Big Paw / Announcer		
1980	The Missing Link	Croak / Slick		
1980	I Go Pogo	Bewildered Bat		
1983	The Charmkins	Bramble Brother #2		
1987	The Big Bang	Extra (English dub)		
1993	Tracey Takes on New York	Extra		
1996	Christmas in Cartoontown	Voice		
2003	It Runs in the Family	Jim Lindsay		
2011	Top Cat: The Movie	Judge/Police Chief/Mayor	Final role	

=== Television ===
Year(s)	Title	Character	Note	Ref
1963	The Patty Duke Show	Charlie Anderson (credited as Robert Kaliban)		
1967	Run for Your Life	Arthur Court		
1980	Drawing Power!	Pop, additional voices		
1982	A Family Circus Easter	Daddy		
1979-2009	SchoolHouse Rock!	Lou, Mr. Chips, additional voices		
1995-1996	Starla and the Jewel Riders	Josh, Merlin, King Jared (voice)		
1999-2000	A Little Curious	Little Cup, Plush (voice)		
2007	Human Giant	Doritos Commercial Man		

=== Video games ===
Year(s)	Title	Character	Ref
2003	Clifford the Big Red Dog: Phonics	Phineas T. Wordsworth, Host Cow	

=== Commercials ===
Year(s)	Company	Character
1968-1984	Ty-D-Bol	Ty-D-Bol Man
1986-1995	Toys "R" Us	Geoffrey

== Discography ==
Albums

- The Best of Schoolhouse Rock (1998)
