= Kitchen Bouquet =

Browning and seasoning sauce

- Product type: Seasoning sauce
- Current owner: The Clorox Company; (HV Food Products Company)
- Country: United States
- Markets: Nationwide

Kitchen Bouquet
Nutritional value per 1 tsp (4.93 mL)
- Energy: 15 kcal (63 kJ)
- Carbohydrates: 3 g
- Sugars: 2 g
- Fat: 0 mg
Vitamins and minerals
Minerals	Quantity %DV^{†}
Sodium	0% 10 mg
- Other constituents: Quantity
- Cholesterol: 0 mg
- ^{†}Percentages estimated using US recommendations for adults.

Kitchen Bouquet is a browning and seasoning sauce primarily composed of caramel with vegetable flavorings. It has been used as a flavoring addition for gravies and other foods since the late 19th century. It is currently produced by the Hidden Valley or HV Food Products Company.

Kitchen Bouquet was manufactured in the late 19th and early 20th centuries by the Palisade Manufacturing Company of West Hoboken, New Jersey. An advertisement in a 1903 edition of The Boston Cooking School Magazine indicated that Kitchen Bouquet, then known as "Tournade's Kitchen Bouquet," had been "a favorite for 30 years." It was one of the products featured in the United States exhibit at the Paris Exposition of 1889.

Its ingredients include caramel, vegetable base (water, carrots, onions, celery, parsnips, turnips, salt, parsley, spices), sodium benzoate and sulfiting agents.

Kitchen Bouquet is also used by food stylists for a variety of appearance effects, including 'coffee' made by adding a few drops to a cup of water and lending a browned appearance to poultry.

== See also ==
- Caramel color
- Food coloring
- Gravy
