= KC Masterpiece =

Barbecue sauce

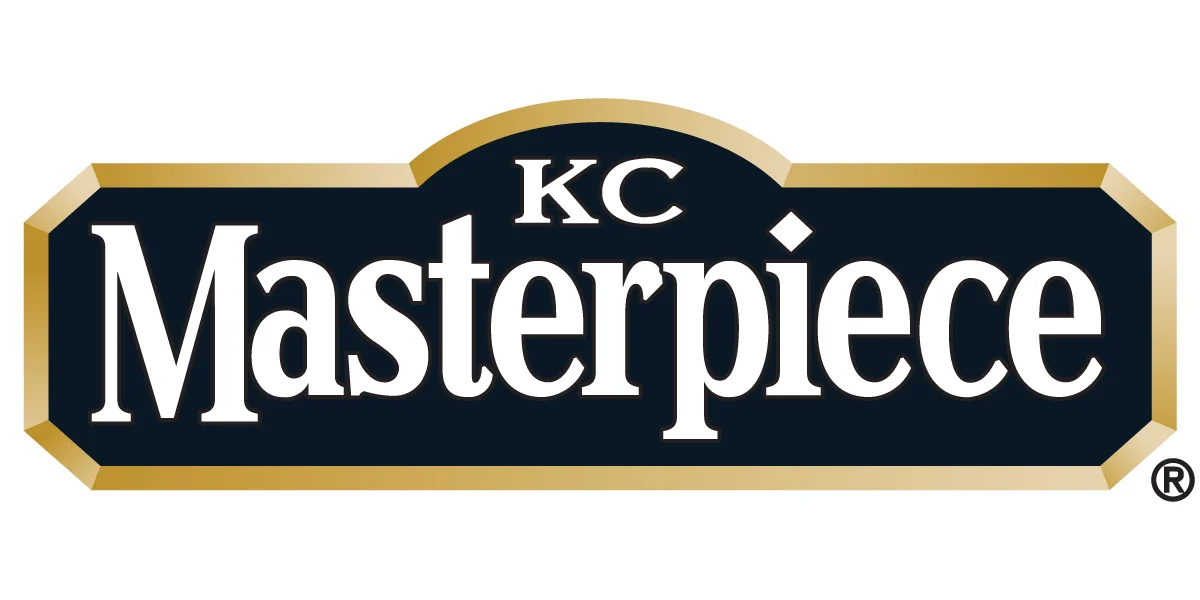
- Product type: Barbecue Sauce
- Current owner: Clorox
- Country: United States
- Introduced: 1977
- Markets: World
- Previous owners: Rich Davis
- Registered as a trademark in: HV Food Products Company
- Website: http://www.kcmasterpiece.com/

KC Masterpiece is a barbecue sauce that is marketed by HV Food Products Company, a subsidiary of Clorox Company.

== History ==
KC Masterpiece Barbeque Sauce was created in 1977 by Richard E. "Rich" Davis M.D., a child psychiatrist practicing in Kansas City, Missouri. Davis was born in 1926, in Joplin, Missouri, and died on 6 October 2015 in Leawood, Kansas.

Initially, Davis named his sauce "KC Soul Style Barbecue Sauce". The original formula consisted of five ingredients. He later renamed it "KC Masterpiece". He presented his sauce to several Kansas City area food brokers with the intention of marketing it to the public through retail supermarket distribution. He also presented Muschup (a combination of ketchup and mustard) and Dilled Muschup (a combination of ketchup, mustard, and dill relish). Most of the area brokerages were reluctant to give the upstart sauces a chance.

Eventually, Davis met Jim Flynn, of Flynn Brokerage. Flynn sampled the sauces and recognized the barbecue sauce’s potential. This decision led to its current popularity. Flynn's concept was a simple grassroots marketing strategy, targeting local supermarkets with food sample demonstrations. The barbeque sauce sold more than 3,000 cases (36,000 bottles) the first weekend, and stores ran out of inventory. The two Muschup varieties were also presented but did not perform as well. In the following months and years, KC Masterpiece sales grew exponentially.

In 1986, after nearly ten years of success in the Kansas City area, Davis received an offer to sell the KC Masterpiece brand to the Kingsford charcoal division of The HV Food Products Company (formally known as Hidden Valley Ranch Food Products, Inc.), which intended to market the sauce nationwide. In the agreement, Davis retained the right to use the sauce in restaurants that he was developing. Of his several restaurants, all eventually closed, the last one in 2009.
