= Rich Davis =

American businessman

Richard E. Davis (1926 – October 6, 2015) founded KC Masterpiece barbecue sauce.

Davis began his career as a child psychiatrist, instructor and author. His academic posts included appointments as professor and acting chairman of the department of psychiatry at Eastern Virginia Medical School, and later, as dean of the school of medicine at the University of North Dakota. He was the creator of K.C. Masterpiece Barbecue Sauce. In 1986, he sold the sauce to the Kingsford Charcoal.

Davis died peacefully at home on October 6, 2015.

== Early life and education ==
Davis was born in Joplin, Missouri. He graduated from Topeka High School in 1944, and served a year and a half in the army. After World War II, he attended Washburn University, Columbia University, and Colorado College. While at Washburn, he was initiated into the Kansas Beta chapter of Phi Delta Theta. He received a medical degree from the University of Kansas in 1954.

== Academic and medical career ==
Davis was a board certified in adult and child psychiatry and was a board examiner in psychiatry and neurology from 1972–1986.

He was the academic co-founder as associate dean of the Eastern Virginia Medical School in Norfolk, Virginia.

Vice-president of health affairs and dean of the medical school at the University of North Dakota, where he helped it gain accreditation as a four-year medical school.

Davis identified manic-depressive [bi-polar] syndrome in childhood and its treatment, and published these findings in the American Journal of Psychiatry. In 1983, he presented on the use of lithium as a treatment at The World Congress of Psychiatry in Vienna.

== Business ==
In 1977, he moved to Kansas City and began marketing various culinary concepts, including Muschup (a combination of ketchup and mustard), Dilled Muschup, and K.C. Soul Style Barbecue Sauce.

While Muschup and Dilled Muschup sold well, the barbecue sauce was the most popular, 3,000 cases of it quickly selling in Kansas City. He later changed its name to KC Masterpiece Barbecue Sauce.

In 1986, he sold the sauce to the Kingsford division of the Clorox company, which took the barbecue sauce nationwide. Presently it is claimed by the manufacturer to be the number 1 selling premium barbecue sauce in the country. He retained the rights to use the sauce at restaurants he was to develop. At one time several restaurants were in operation, but all have since closed.

A barbecue (dubbed the Congressional Picnic) is held annually on the south lawn of the White House. It is open to the president and vice president, all representatives and senators, and their families. Davis and his sons twice prepared barbecues for the Congressional Picnic, once for George H. W. Bush in 1992 and then for George W. Bush in 2004.

== Unfinished business ==
Food World: An Idea With Global Proportions For Kansas City. The Kansas City Star. Dirck Steimel. February 28, 1990.

== Music ==
A child prodigy on the piano, Davis composed many jazz and blues numbers. He created the words and music for the Youth Volunteer Corps of America's anthem. He also composed Two Piano Sonata on Themes, transcribed by Wally Bradford and performed at several Midwestern universities. In 1992, Davis recorded a two-piano jazz session with Grammy nominee Jay McShann.

== Honors and awards ==
- UMKC Henry W. Bloch School of Management Regional Entrepreneur of the Year 1995: Rich Davis, K.C. Masterpiece Barbecue
- Founding chairman of the board of the Youth Volunteer Corps of America.
- Founding chairman of the Alliance for Epilepsy Research board.
- Davis was awarded the Distinguished Service Citation from the University of Kansas in 2002.
- Stop the Violence Coalition award, the Kindest Kansas Citian Award. 1991.
- Dr. Davis and wife Coleen were honored with the Salvation Army William Booth Award in 1993.
- American Royal Barbecue Hall of Fame Legacy Inductee
- KC Masterpiece won the prestigious "Best Sauce on the Planet" award at the American Royal Barbecue Sauce Contest in 1980.

== Books and articles ==
- The All American Barbecue Book (1988) Rich Davis & Shifra Stein, Vintage Books, Random House
- All About Bar-B-Q Kansas City Style (1985) Rich Davis & Shifra Stein, Barbacoa Press
- Grill Wars, Forbes Magazine, June 16, 1986
- Best Barbecued Ribs, Ladies Home Journal, August 1984. (Rich Davis)
- Kansas City Styled Barbecue Ribs, Playboy Magazine, August 1985. (Rich Davis)
- People Magazine, August 19, 1985. Vol. 24, No. 8. Dr. Rich Davis Gave Up Psychiatry to Put His Own Brand on Kansas City's Best Barbecue Sauce
- Dr. Rich Davis, the Sauce Doctor—R.I.P. Barbecuebible.com. By Steven Raichlen.
- The Kansas City Star. Rich Davis, founder of KC Masterpiece and barbecue legend, dies.
- Legacy.com.
