= Judson Dunaway =

American businessman

S. Judson Dunaway (1890–1976), was an inventor, entrepreneur, and philanthropist to the community of Dover, New Hampshire.

== Household products ==
Dunaway manufactured a number of household specialty chemicals, including Delete rust and stain remover, Vanish toilet bowl cleaner, Elf drain cleaner, Expello moth crystals and insecticide, and Bug-a-Boo moth crystals and aerosol. Expello was the leading brand in moth crystals, but Vanish was Dunaway's most successful product, due more to his marketing than the quality of the product.

Elf drain cleanser consisted of lye crystals. This was a less effective agent than crystal Drano, which added aluminum shards to generate heat and provide a sharp edge to cut through hair, but it was as good as any of Drano's other competitors. Delete rust and stain remover consisted of oxalic acid (an anti-rust agent), citric acid (a chelating agent) and microcrystalline cellulose, a very soft abrasive. It was a good product, but addressed a very small niche in the marketplace.

Dunaway launched Vanish in 1937, based on a patent for Sani-Flush which had expired in 1932. Hygienic Products, who had been making Sani-Flush since 1911, sued Dunaway for trademark infringement in 1945. The case was resolved in Dunaway's favor in a landmark ruling. The case is still commonly cited in infringement lawsuits.

== FTC actions ==
In 1957, the Federal Trade Commission charged the Judson Dunaway Corporation, General Mills, and Swanee Paper Corporation with violating the Clayton Act in dealing with Grand Union Co., a large eastern supermarket chain. Grand Union agreed not to carry similar products to those of Dunaway and General Mills, and Grand Union received promotional allowances not available to Grand Union's competitors. All four companies signed consent decrees, a legal document in which one does not admit to doing anything wrong, but agrees to stop doing it.

== Company history ==
Originally, Dunaway did business as Expello Corporation. Eventually, he did business as the Judson Dunaway Corporation. The New Hampshire Secretary of State's office online search does not show any corporation ever existing under either name.

At the end of Dunaway's career in the late 1950s or early 1960s, the company was sold to The Drackett Company. Vanish was a higher volume brand with good margins, and became one of their major brands. With no real competitors, Delete had satisfactory margins, but minimal volume. Drackett made little effort to market it, but simply accepted orders to replenish merchants' inventories. When ceramic cooktops first became popular in the 1970s, it enjoyed a major boom in sales, but was still a product to be manufactured only one day a year. As manufacturers of the leading Drano brand, Drackett wanted to discontinue the Elf brand. Expello was seen as a significant future liability, and since Drackett already had the Renuzit brand, Expello was sold to Willert Home Products.

== Personal life ==
Dunaway and his wife, Anna E., lived on Belknap street in Dover during his early career as a manufacturer. In 1946, he purchased the house at 120 Silver Street, Dover, New Hampshire, from Mary Dearborn. Personally, or through his foundation, Dunaway funded squash courts at Colby College in Waterville, Maine, the Judson Dunaway Library and Media Center at St. Thomas Aquinas High School in Dover, New Hampshire, a wing at Wentworth-Douglass Hospital in Dover, a community center in Ogunquit, Maine, and the football field at Dover High School.

Judson wrote a chapter on the Dunaway coat of arms in the book "The Dunaways of Virginia", by Anna Elizabeth Clendening.
