= Wilma Dunaway =

American sociologist, writer

Wilma A. Dunaway
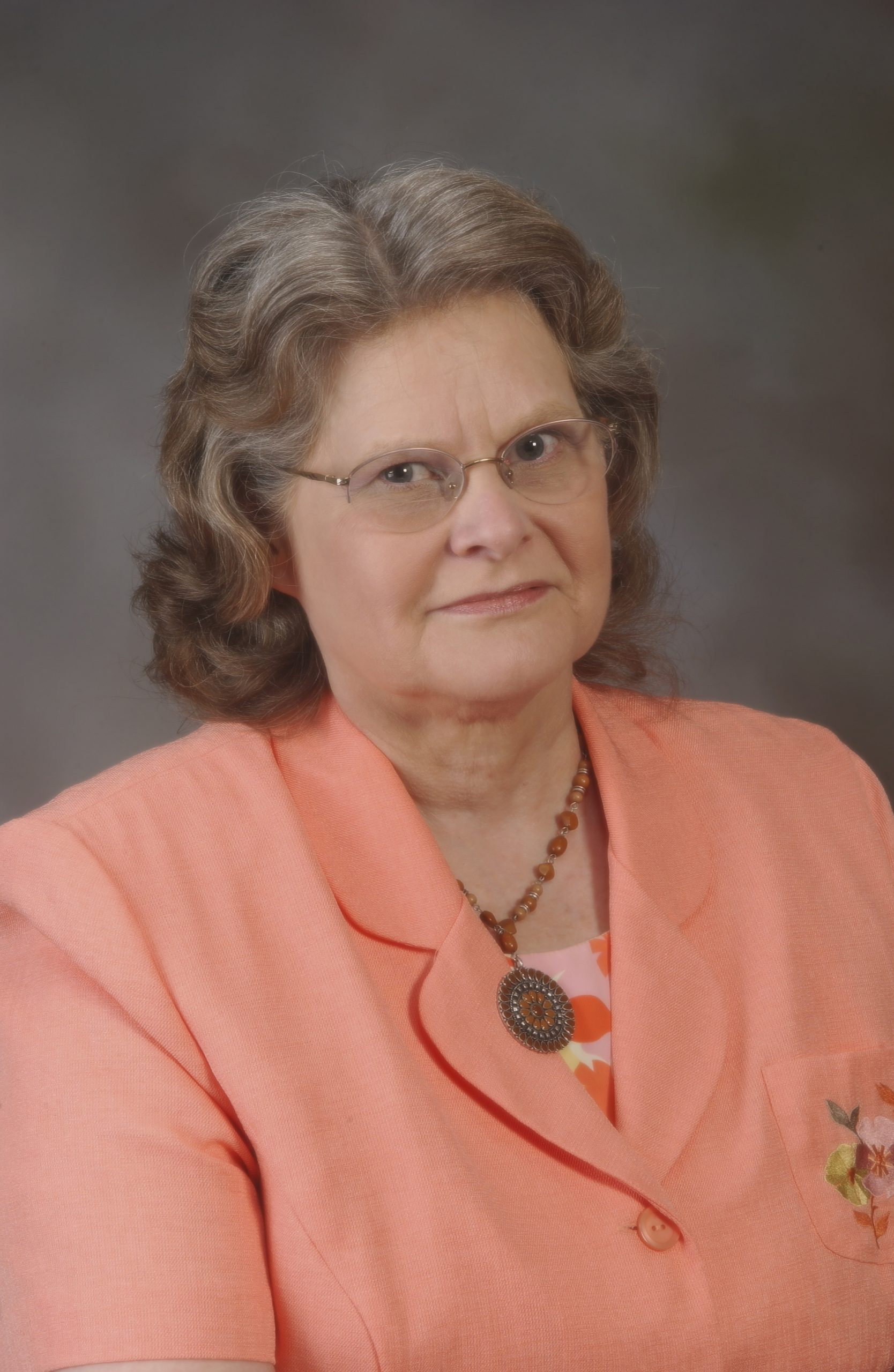
- Dunaway Staff Photo from University of Tennessee
- Born: July 1, 1944 (age 82); Knoxville, TN
- Education: University of Tennessee
- Occupations: Educator, Author
- Known for: Civil Rights activism, books about the Appalachian region, and her role as a professor
- Spouse: Prof. Donald A. Clelland

Wilma A. Dunaway (born July 1, 1944) is Professor Emerita of Sociology in the Government and International Affairs Program at Virginia Polytechnic Institute and State University (also called Virginia Tech), Blacksburg, Virginia.

== Biography ==
Dunaway earned her bachelor's, master's and Ph.D. degrees from the University of Tennessee. She received a fellowship from the Woodrow Wilson Foundation to complete her dissertation about the integration of antebellum Appalachia into global capitalism.

Since 1999, she taught as an associate professor at Virginia Tech. She was named a "professor emerita" in 2015.

Dunaway's research interests include international political economy, world-systems analysis, racial and ethnic conflict, comparative slavery studies, Native American studies, Appalachian Studies, radical feminist perspectives on women's work, and qualitative research methodologies.

According to Virginia Tech's 2005 announcement of the Joseph Campbell prize, Dunaway's academic accomplishments were summarized:

She is a widely recognized scholar of African-American slavery, Appalachian studies, and world-systems analysis. Her research focuses on eliminating historical silences about people who have been peripheralized by race, class, or gender. She teaches graduate courses on comparative social movements, development and global change, gender and development, and international political economy.

Dunaway published four revisionist monographs about pre-Civil War Appalachia, and that work has been recognized through two Weatherford Awards (1996, 2003) for her work about Southern Appalachia. In addition, she has edited two books that offer revisions and extensions of world-systems analysis.

== Awards ==
- 1996, W. D. Weatherford Award, Appalachian Center, Berea College, for The First American Frontier
- 2005. The Joseph Campbell Prize in Ethnography, Sarah Lawrence College. Included honorary doctorate

== Selected works ==
=== Books ===
- Southern Laboring Women: Race, Class and Gender Conflict in Antebellum Appalachia. Cambridge University Press, forthcoming.
- Slavery in the American Mountain South. Cambridge University Press, 2003.
- The African-American Family in Slavery and Emancipation. Cambridge University Press, 2003.
- Crises and Resistance in the 21st Century World-System. Praeger Press, 2003.
- New Theoretical Directions for the 21st Century World-System. Praeger Press, 2003.
- The First American Frontier: Transition to Capitalism in Southern Appalachia, 1700-1860. University of North Carolina Press, 1996.

=== Articles ===
- Dunaway, W. A. (2001). The double register of history: Situating the forgotten woman and her household in capitalist commodity chains. journal of world-systems research, 2-29.
- Dunaway, W. A. (2014). Bringing Commodity Chain Analysis Back to Its World-Systems Roots: Rediscovering Women s Work and Households. Journal of World-Systems Research, 64–81.
- Dunaway, W. A., & Clelland, D. A. (2017). Moving toward theory for the 21st century: The centrality of nonwestern semiperipheries to world ethnic/racial inequality. Journal of World-Systems Research, 23(2), 399–464.
