= Drano =

Drain cleaner

- Inventor: Harry Drackett
- Inception: 1923
- Available: Yes
- Current supplier: S. C. Johnson & Son
- Website: drano.com

Drano (styled as Drāno) is an American brand of chemical drain cleaner that is manufactured by S. C. Johnson & Son.

== Crystal Drano ==
According to the National Institutes of Health's Household Products Database, the crystal form is composed of:

- Sodium hydroxide (lye), NaOH
- Sodium nitrate, NaNO_{3}
- Sodium chloride (salt), NaCl
- Aluminium shards, Al

After Drano crystals are added to water, the reaction works as follows:

1. Aluminium reacts with lye: 2NaOH + 2Al + 2H_{2}O → 3H_{2} + 2NaAlO_{2}, although the exact species in solution may be NaAl(OH)_{4}. The release of hydrogen gas stirs the mixture and improves the interaction between the lye and the materials clogging the drain. It's possible that pressure may build up inside the pipe, causing the hot, caustic solution to spurt out of the drain.
2. Sodium nitrate reacts with hydrogen gas: Na^{+} + NO_{3}^{−} + 4H_{2} → NaOH + NH_{3} + 2H_{2}O. This removes hydrogen, which poses a fire and explosion hazard and produces ammonia, which is also capable of decomposing organic material, albeit less aggressively than lye. The sodium hydroxide (lye) is consumed by further action of the first reaction.

Crystal Drano was invented in 1923 by Harry Drackett. From the 1960s into the 1980s, Drackett advertised Once in every week, Drano in every drain.

Bristol-Myers bought the Drackett Company in 1965 and sold it to S. C. Johnson in 1992. Drano has been developed into several forms; as of 2016, the original Crystal Drano is marketed as Drano Kitchen Crystals Clog Remover.

== Other Drano products ==
=== Drano Aerosol Plunger ===
Drano Aerosol Plunger was developed in the late 1960s, intended as a safer product that would be kinder environmentally. It was basically just a can of CFC propellant, the best-known brand of which was Freon. After Earth Day in 1970, there came increasing pressure to eliminate CFC propellants. Drackett used cheaper propellants, a blend of propane and butane, in all its other products. However, the propellant mix created a fire hazard.

The product was problematic. The forceful propellant required most consumers use both hands to control the can, plus another hand or two to hold a rag over the drain vent to contain the pressure. The pressure sometimes knocked apart poor plumbing without blasting free the clog. Consumers who ignored instructions and attempted to use chemical drain openers first could be chemically burned from blow-back.

=== Liquid Drano ===
Liquid Drano was introduced in response to Clorox's purchase of Liquid-Plumr in 1969. Originally, it was simply a liquid lye (sodium hydroxide). In the late 1970s, the product was reformulated as a combination of liquid lye and sodium hypochlorite. Sodium hypochlorite is used in low (5%) concentration as laundry bleach and in higher concentrations as a swimming pool disinfectant.

Liquid Drano is marketed in several forms, including Drano Liquid Clog Remover, Drano Max Build-Up Remover, and Drano Dual-Force Foamer Clog Remover. All are variations on the basic Liquid Drano formula.

=== Drano Foamer ===
Drano Foamer first started out a powder similar to Crystal Drano in which water had to be added. This was the first-ever foaming pipe snake product. This caused Liquid-Plumr to launch Liquid-Plumr: Foaming Pipe Snake, which is a 2-in-1 liquid.

Many years later, the makers of Drano decided to reimagine Drano Foamer as a 2-in-1 liquid known as the Dual Force Foamer.

=== Drano Kit ===
The Drano Snake Plus Drain Cleaning Kit combines a mechanical snake for loosening clogs, with yet another gel-variation on the Liquid Drano formula.

== Use for bombs ==
Drano has been used to create homemade bombs called Drano bombs by mixing the product with aluminum. In 2017, a Drano bomb severely burned a 12-year-old girl in the neighborhood of Harlem in New York City. Drano bombs have the ability to cause third-degree burns and blindness.

== Use in the Hi-Fi murders ==
After watching the film Magnum Force (1973), in which a prostitute is shown immediately dying after being forced to drink Drano, former United States Air Force airmen Dale Selby Pierre and William Andrews decided it would be an efficient method of murder in their crime. However, the hostages did not instantly die after being forced to drink the cleaning product. Angered by this, Pierre and Andrews decided to shoot three of them, and attempted to strangle the fourth.

== See also ==
- Liquid-Plumr, another comparable drain cleaning brand by The Clorox Company
