= Michele Dunaway =

American author of romantic novels (born 1965)

- Born: St. Louis, Missouri, U.S.
- Occupation: Novelist
- Writing career
- Period: 2000–present
- Genre: Romance
- Website: www.micheledunaway.com

Michele Dunaway is an American author of romantic novels.

USA Today reviewer Becky Condit recommended her 2014 book, A Little Christmas Jingle, as "a very sweet Christmas season story" with "a roller coaster of emotions and family interference."

Dunaway attended Kirkwood High School and Webster University, and many of her works feature St. Louis locations.

She is also a high school teacher and the Missouri Interscholastic Press Association named her its 2012 High School Journalism Teacher of the Year.

== Bibliography ==
- Date First Published, Title, Contents Notes (if any), Series Connection (if any), Book/s Number in Series (if any), Original Publisher
- 2000, A Little Office Romance, none, Harlequin American Romance
- 2001, Taming the Tabloid Heiress, none, Harlequin American Romance
- 2002, The Simply Scandalous Princess, The Carradignes: American Royalty, Harlequin American Romance
- 2002, Catching the Corporate Playboy (a Jacobsen book), none, Harlequin American Romance
- 2003, Sweeping the Bride Away, none, Harlequin American Romance
- 2003, The Playboy's Protegee, (A Jacobsen book), none, Harlequin American Romance
- 2004, Unwrapping Mr. Wright, none, Harlequin American Romance
- 2004, About Last Night, (A Jacobsen book), none, Harlequin American Romance
- 2005, Emergency Engagement, none, Harlequin American Romance
- 2006, Legally Tender, none, Harlequin American Romance
- 2006, Capturing the Cop, (A Jacobsen book), Harlequin American Romance
- 2006, The Marriage Campaign, American Beauties, Harlequin American Romance
- 2006, The Wedding Secret, American Beauties, Harlequin American Romance
- 2007, Nine Months' Notice, American Beauties, Harlequin American Romance
- 2007, Hart's Victory, NASCAR, Harlequin
- 2008, Tailspin, NASCAR, Harlequin
- 2008, Out of Line, NASCAR, Harlequin
- 2008, The Christmas Date, Harlequin American Romance
- 2009, The Marriage Recipe, Harlequin American Romance
- 2009, Twins for the Teacher, Harlequin American Romance
- 2009, Bachelor CEO, Harlequin American Romance
- 2010, Baby in the Boardroom, Harlequin American Romance
- 2010, The Doctor's Little Miracle, Harlequin American Romance
- 2014, A Little Christmas Jingle, Man of the Month, St. Martin's Press
- 2015, Burning for You, Man of the Month, St. Martin's Press
- 2015, Fan the Flames, Man of the Month, St. Martin's Press
- 2016 Man of the Month: A Calendar Romance Series e-book bunble, St. Martin's Press
- 2023, What Happens in the Air: Love in the Valley 1 Harlequin Special Edition
- 2023, All's Fair in Love and Wine: Love in the Valley 2 Harlequin Special Edition
- 2023, Love's Secret Ingredient: Love in the Valley 3 Harlequin Special Edition
- 2023, One Suite Deal: Love in the Valley 4 Harlequin Special Edition
- 2024, Room For Two More: Love in the Valley 5 Harlequin Special Edition
- 2025, The Playboy Project: Love in the Valley 6 Harlequin Special Edition
- 2025, Conveniently a Fortune Harlequin Special Edition, The Fortunes of Texas
- 2026, A Texas-Sized Fake Out: Legacy Canyon 1 Harlequin Special Edition
- 2026, Her Fortune VIP Harlequin Special Edition, The Fortunes of Texas
- 2026, Inheriting a Rodeo Cowboys: Legacy Canyon 2 Harlequin Special Edition
- 2027, The Rancher's Second Chance: Legacy Canyon 3 Harlequin Special Edition
- 2027, Snowbound with the Maverick Harlequin Special Edition, Montana Mavericks
