= Oleylamine =

Names
- Preferred IUPAC name (9Z)-Octadec-9-en-1-amine
- Other names 9-Octadecenylamine; 1-Amino-9-octadecene, (9Z)-Octadecene

Identifiers
CAS Number	112-90-3
3D model (JSmol)	Interactive image
ChEMBL	ChEMBL1976606
ChemSpider	4512354
ECHA InfoCard	100.003.650
EC Number	204-015-5
PubChem CID	5356789
UNII	ZDQ1JWQ8DT
CompTox Dashboard (EPA)	DTXSID8026933
- InChI: InChI=1S/C18H37N/c1-2-3-4-5-6-7-8-9-10-11-12-13-14-15-16-17-18-19/h9-10H,2-8,11-19H2,1H3/b10-9- Key: QGLWBTPVKHMVHM-KTKRTIGZSA-N
- SMILES: CCCCCCCC/C=C\CCCCCCCCN

Properties
Chemical formula	C_{18}H_{37}N
Molar mass	267.493 g/mol
Appearance	colourless oil, yellowish when impure
Density	0.813 g/cm^{3}
Melting point	21 °C (70 °F; 294 K)
Boiling point	364 °C (687 °F; 637 K)
Solubility in water	Insoluble

Hazards
NFPA 704 (fire diamond)	3 0 0
Flash point	154 °C (309 °F; 427 K)
- Except where otherwise noted, data are given for materials in their standard state (at 25 °C [77 °F], 100 kPa). Infobox references

Oleylamine is an organic compound with a molecular formula C_{18}H_{35}NH_{2}. It is an unsaturated fatty amine related to the fatty acid oleic acid. The pure compound is a clear and colorless liquid. Commercially available oleylamine reagents vary in colour from clear and colorless to varying degrees of yellow due to impurities. The major impurities include trans isomer (elaidylamine) and other long chain amines with varying chain lengths. Minor impurities include oxygen-containing substances such as amides and nitroalkanes.

== Chemical reactions ==
Oleylamine reacts with carboxylic acid to form its carboxylate salt through an exothermic reaction. Its carboxylate salt can further condensate into amides through the loss of one water molecule. In the presence of acetic acid, oleylamine forms with DNA insoluble complexes with the radii of the particles equal 60–65 nm.

== Uses ==
Commercially, it is mainly used as a surfactant or precursor to surfactants.

It has also been used in the laboratory to synthesise nanoparticles. It can function both as a solvent for the reaction mixture and as a coordinating agent to stabilize the surface of the particles. It can also coordinate with metal ions, change the form of metal precursors and affect the formation kinetics of nanoparticles during the synthesis. As a ligand bound to metal nanoparticle surfaces, it exhibits an apparent length of 1.8 - 2.2 nm. This reported value varies between studies and the degree of interdigitation between overlapping oleylamine layers, particularly those of neighboring nanoparticles.

== Safety ==
Oleylamine has an LD_{50} (intraperitoneal) of 888 mg/kg in mice; however, note that it is listed as a level 3 health hazard on the NFPA diamond, so it should be handled with caution.

== Characterization ==
Oleylamine can be characterized using MS, HNMR, CNMR, IR, and Raman. Each technique shows distinct peaks in various regions.

Proton Nuclear Magnetic Resonance spectrum of Oleylamine

== See also ==
- Oleamide
