= Gojo Industries =

American manufacturing company

Gojo Industries, Inc.

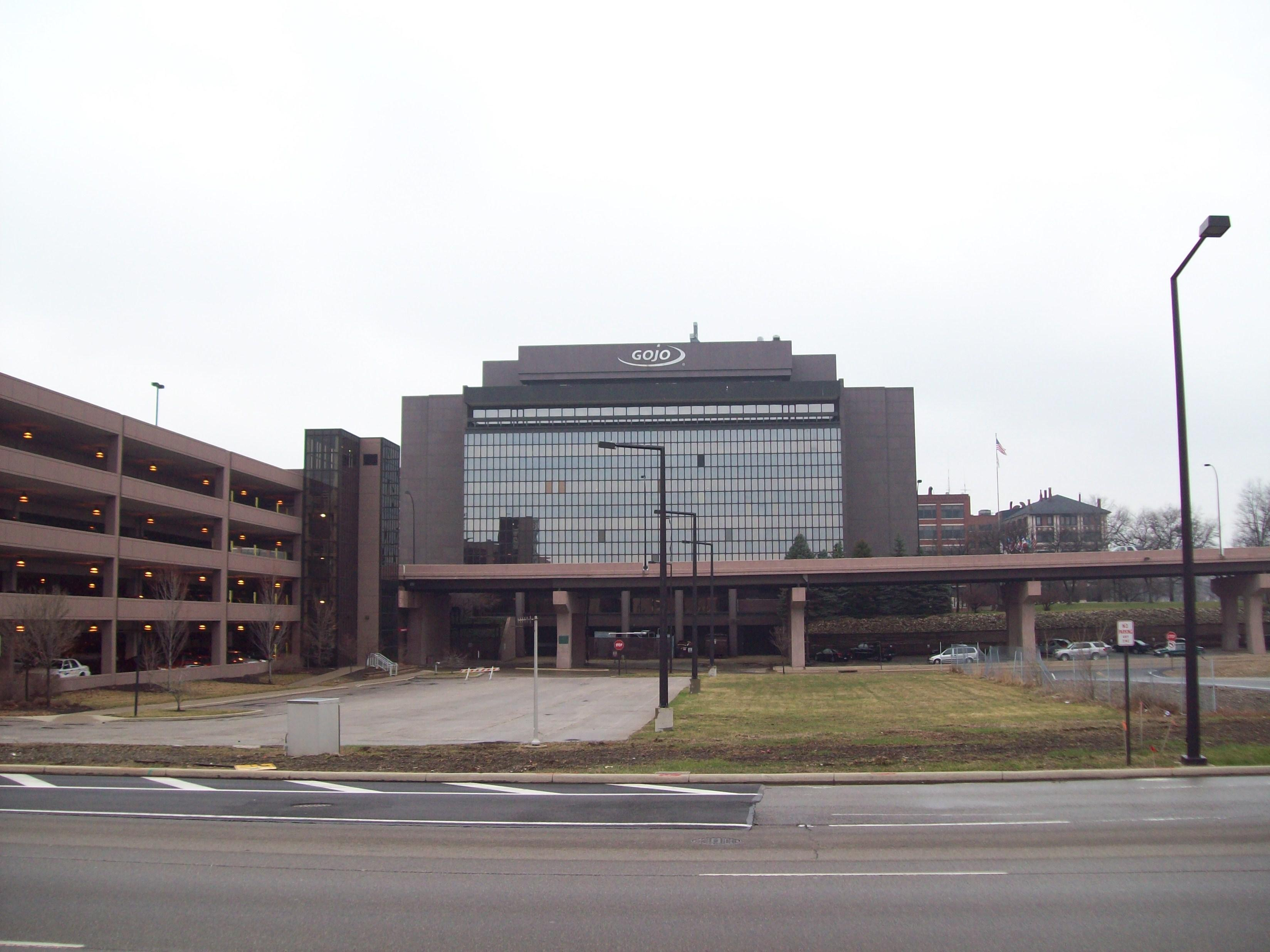
- Headquarters in Akron, Ohio
- Type: Subsidiary
- Industry: Consumer goods
- Founded: 1946; 80 years ago
- Founders: Jerry and Goldie Lippman
- Headquarters: One Gojo Plaza; Akron, Ohio, U.S.
- Area served: Worldwide
- Key people: Marcella Kanfer Rolnick (chairman); Carey Jaros (president and CEO)
- Products: Cleaning agents, Hand sanitizers, Foam soap dispensers
- Number of employees: 2,500
- Parent: Clorox
- Website: gojo.com

Gojo Industries, Inc. is an American manufacturer of hand hygiene and skin care products, with one of its best-known products being Purell hand sanitizer. It also offers an electronic hand hygiene monitoring system for medical institutions.

Gojo was founded in 1946 by Jerry and Goldie Lippman in Akron, Ohio, where it has been headquartered for almost its entire history – although it was located in Cuyahoga Falls for a period. In 2026, Clorox announced the acquisition of the company.

== History ==
During World War II, Goldie worked at the Miller Tire Co. rubber factory and Jerry at the Goodyear Aircraft plant. Like other employees there, both often came home with sticky, difficult-to-remove graphite, tar, and carbon on their hands and clothes.

Disliking the products used by the workers to clean their clothes, they set out to find an effective cleaning product that didn't use water. To do this, Goldie and Jerry worked with Professor Clarence Cook of Kent State University's chemistry department.

In an attempt to formulate a heavy-duty hand cleaner, they created Gojo Hand Cleaner and sold it to rubber workers, who had sometimes used benzene and other noxious chemicals to clean their skin. Starting to promote it to automotive service facilities, they left their factory jobs and started Gojo.

Although Goldie's nickname gave the firm and its product (GoGo) its first name, which had already been given to another company, the founders came up with Gojo, with the "G" standing for Goldie and the "J" standing for Jerry.

In 1950, Gojo invented a liquid soap dispenser after realizing that users were using much more than was needed to clean their hands, causing buyers to think the product was too expensive. Jerry Lipmann filed a patent for this portion-limiting dispenser in 1952. The original product was meant to clean, not sanitize the skin. In 1988, the company developed the Purell product to disinfect hands.

In 2004, Gojo sold Pfizer the exclusive rights to distribute Purell in the consumer market, while Gojo Industries retained the rights to existing industrial markets. In 2006, Pfizer sold its Consumer Healthcare division, and hence the rights to Purell, to Johnson & Johnson. In 2010, Gojo bought the brand back from Johnson & Johnson.

In February 2014, Gojo Industries acquired privately held Laboratoires Prodene Klint of Croissy-Beaubourg, France. The acquisition allows both companies greater geographic footprint and increased manufacturing operations. Prodene Klint manufactures professional hygiene, cosmetics and disinfectant products.

On June 6, 2015, Gojo launched its Gojo Smartlink Observation System, a mobile application that connects to Gojo Smartlink web-based software and allows for the electronic collection and collation of hand hygiene and personal protective equipment (PPE) compliance metrics. On 1 January 2020, Carey Jaros became Gojo president and CEO.

== Operations ==
Operating worldwide with offices in the United Kingdom, France, Australia, Japan, and Brazil, it has factories in Ohio and across North America, as well as in Latin America, South America, Europe, and Asia. Its main manufacturing and distribution facilities are at its Lippman Campus in Cuyahoga Falls, Ohio.

=== Ownership ===
Marcella Kanfer Rolnick chairs the family business and runs The Lippman Kanfer Family Foundation focused on Jewish philanthropy and its sister organization Lippman Kanfer Foundation for Living Torah, along with other family members. Carey Jaros has been chairman and CEO since 2020.

On January 22, 2026, Clorox announced an agreement to acquire Gojo for $2.25 billion in cash. The acquisition was completed on April 01, 2026.

=== Products ===
Gojo manufactures and markets skin health and hygiene solutions for away-from-home settings. Its products include hand soaps and sanitizers, moisturizers, shower washes, shampoos, foam hand washes, surgical scrubs, perineal care products, skin conditioners, chemical removing hand cleaners, hand protection products, and dispensers.

Gojo's products are usually found in public facilities. For many of these facilities, such as manufacturing and hospitals, Gojo makes placement guides recommending consumers place various Gojo product brands in strategic locations.

=== Headquarters ===
Gojo's main office is a 213,000 sq ft (19,788 m^{2}) building at One Gojo Plaza on South Main Street in Akron, Ohio. The company bought the property from the City of Akron for $1 in 2000 as part of a deal to bring its headquarters to downtown Akron from Cuyahoga Falls. Originally the headquarters of Goodrich Corporation and then Michelin Americas Small Tires, the building now holds about 600 Gojo employees.
