= Myristamine oxide =

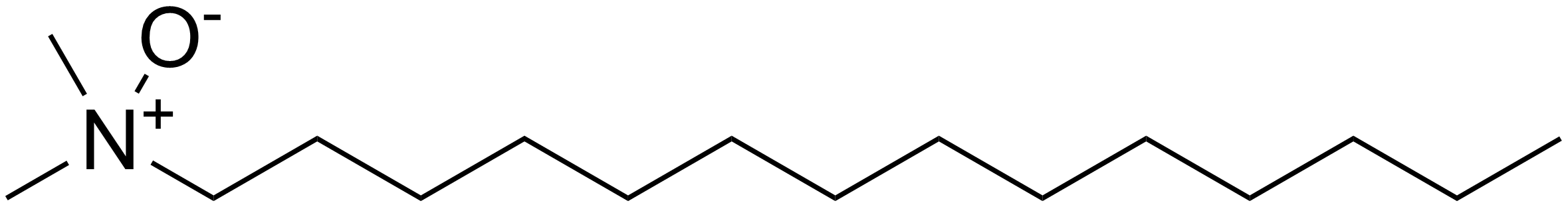

Names
- Preferred IUPAC name N,N-Dimethyltetradecan-1-amine N-oxide
- Other names: Tetradecyldimethylaminoxide; N,N-Dimethyl-1-tetradecanamine-N-oxide; Myristyl dimethyl amine oxide; Myristyldimethylamine oxide; N,N-Dimethyltetradecylamine N-oxide; Dimethyl-oxido-tetradecyl-azanium

Identifiers
CAS Number	3332-27-2
3D model (JSmol)	Interactive image
ChemSpider	17695
ECHA InfoCard	100.020.055
EC Number	222-059-3
MeSH	C518255
PubChem CID	18739
UNII	J086PM3RRT
CompTox Dashboard (EPA)	DTXSID2029660
- InChI: InChI=1S/C16H35NO/c1-4-5-6-7-8-9-10-11-12-13-14-15-16-17(2,3)18/h4-16H2,1-3H3 Key: ONHFWHCMZAJCFB-UHFFFAOYSA-N; InChI=1/C16H35NO/c1-4-5-6-7-8-9-10-11-12-13-14-15-16-17(2,3)18/h4-16H2,1-3H3 Key: ONHFWHCMZAJCFB-UHFFFAOYAJ
- SMILES: [O-][N+](C)(C)CCCCCCCCCCCCCC

Properties
Chemical formula	C_{16}H_{35}NO
Molar mass	257.462 g·mol^{−1}
Appearance	White solid
Melting point	130 °C (266 °F; 403 K)
Solubility in water	10 g/L at 20 °C
- Surface tension
CMC	268 μM

Hazards
- GHS labelling
Pictograms	(GHS05: Corrosive)
Signal word	Danger
Hazard statements	H315, H318
Precautionary statements	P280, P305+P351+P338
- Safety data sheet (SDS)
- Except where otherwise noted, data are given for materials in their standard state (at 25 °C [77 °F], 100 kPa). verify (what is ?) Infobox references

Myristamine oxide is an amine oxide based zwitterionic surfactant with a C_{14} (tetradecyl) alkyl tail. It is used as a foam stabilizer and hair conditioning agent in some shampoos and conditioners. Like other amine oxide based surfactants it is antimicrobial, being slightly more effective than lauryldimethylamine oxide against the common bacteria S. aureus and E. coli.

== See also ==
- Lauryldimethylamine oxide – An analogous compound with a C_{12} tail
