= Youth Volunteer Corps =

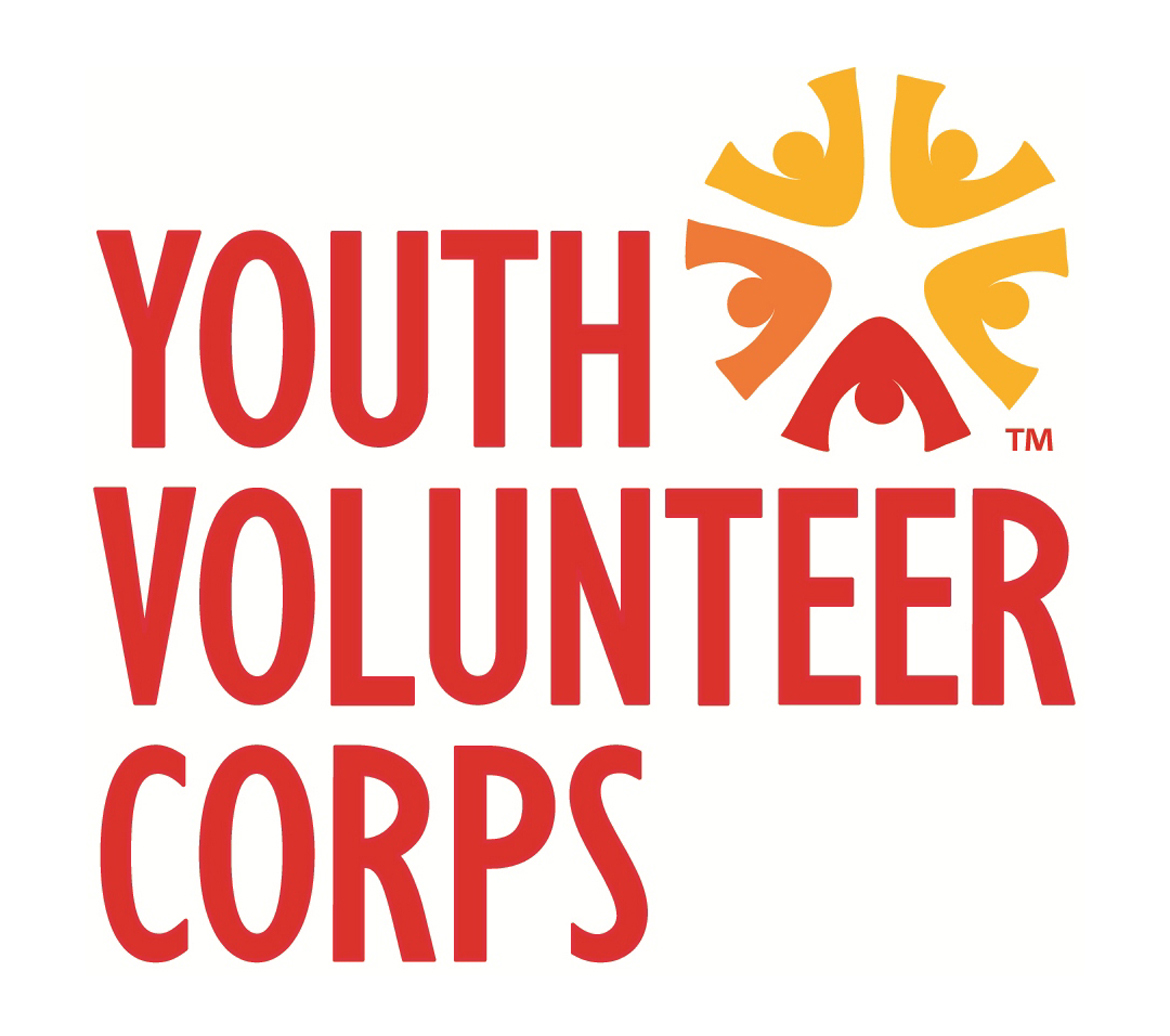
- 2013 Logo for Youth Volunteer Corps
- Formation: 1987
- Type: Youth organization
- Legal status: Non-profit organization
- Purpose: We engage youth in team-based service experiences that build life and work skills while inspiring a lifetime ethic of service.
- Headquarters: Kansas City, MO
- Location: United States
- Members: Youth ages 11-18
- CEO: Tracy Hale
- Website: Youth Volunteer Corps

Youth Volunteer Corps,(YVC), is a non-profit service organization operating throughout the United States and Canada that was created to introduce, encourage, and support the spirit of volunteerism in youth ages 11 to 18 through consistent, well-organized volunteer opportunities. It began in 1987 as a single organization in Kansas City, Missouri, sponsored by the Heart of America United Way and was funded by numerous public and private sources.

Since then YVC has grown to dozens of affiliated sites in the United States and Canada, sponsored locally by diverse community-based organizations such as Volunteer Centers, YMCA, Boys and Girls Clubs, Camp Fire, United Way, City Parks & Recreation, and school districts. Funding is provided by foundations, corporations, individuals, United Way, and both the local and federal government.

== Mission statement and goals ==
Mission: “We create volunteer opportunities to address community needs and to inspire youth for a lifetime commitment to service.”
The stated goals of YVC are:

1. To engage young people in service projects that are challenging, rewarding and educational.
2. To serve the unmet needs of the community and its residents.
3. To promote among youth a greater understanding and appreciation for the diversity of their community.
4. To promote a lifetime ethic of service among youth.

Examples of projects include:

- Serving meals to the homeless
- Constructing and restoring trails
- AIDS education and outreach
- Organizing recycling programs
- Assisting kids with disabilities
- Removing graffiti
- Painting murals
- Tutoring elementary school children
- Performing skits for children
- Renovating sub-standard housing
- Assisting local animal shelters

== Fundamental components ==
YVC is a membership organization where affiliates (or local YVC sites), are provided with training, fundraising opportunities, support and programming. The program consists of two fundamental components:

Summer Component: Youth volunteer on extended projects throughout the summer, allowing for the opportunity to see larger outcomes and accomplishments. Youth are a part of a team supervised by trained adult Team Leaders where they learn teamwork, appreciation for diversity and civic responsibility.

School-Year Component: Youth serve as teams during the school year service projects after school and on weekends. Additionally, YVC program directors, team leaders and staff work with teachers to design and implement age-appropriate service projects that tie school curriculum to community service.

== History ==
As part of his college senior thesis project research in 1985, YVC President David Battey interviewed leaders in the newly forming youth service field. He found that while service opportunities were sporadically available through schools, churches and synagogues, a broad-based community organization offering challenging, organized service opportunities to youth of all ethnic and socio-economic backgrounds was not consistently available.

Developing a framework for such an organization, Battey returned to his hometown of Kansas City and established the Youth Volunteer Corps of Greater Kansas City under the sponsorship of Heart of America United Way and with funding from public and private sources.

- 1985: David Battey and four fellow Williams College seniors present thesis on national service. The grade (an A) boosts David's GPA and the work leads to the formation of YVC.
- 1986: Battey, the first volunteer, begins researching program and funding options while living at his parents’ house in Kansas City.
- 1987: The program is given a name and a logo designed pro bono by Kansas City advertising agency, Bernstein-Rein.

The Heart of America United Way Volunteer Center sponsors the YVC of Greater Kansas City and gives Battey a desk, phone, secretarial support and credibility.
The first 68 diverse Youth Volunteers serve on one of 12 teams doing four week-long projects in the Kansas City area. A Youth Advisory Council is formed and school year service projects begin.

- 1988: YVC of Greater Kansas City grows to 112 Youth Volunteers in the summer program.

Youth Service America sponsors the replication of the YVC model by hiring Battey on October 1 as the director of YVC, now a parent organization that supports local YVC sites.

- 1989: The first expansion YVC site is started in Spartanburg, SC, as part of the United Way of the Piedmont.
- 1990: YSA receives a $1 million four-year grant from the W. K. Kellogg Foundation to expand the YVC model.

The first YVC national conference is held in Washington, DC with 12 attendees.

- 1991: Several new YVC sites open across the US including several in Michigan.
- 1992: On May 1, YVC becomes an independent national nonprofit organization based in Kansas City, with Dr. Rich Davis as founding Board Chairman.
- 1993: YVC opens its 30th site.
- 1994: YVC's first group of AmeriCorps members begins in September under the direction of Joe Gonzales.

Dr. Lynne Ford publishes positive results in her independent evaluation of the YVC model and its impact on youth.

- 1995: YVC Canada is formed with headquarters in Calgary, Alberta.
- 1996: The first YVC International Conference is held in San Antonio, Texas, with 150 attendees including several from Canada.

Don Sloan becomes YVC Board Chair.

- 1997: Representatives from the YVC Network, including Battey and three Board members, attend the Presidents’ Summit on Volunteerism in Philadelphia and commit to doubling the number of Youth Volunteers to 40,000 by the end of 2000.
- 1998: YVC launches its cars for cause vehicle donation program with strong support from H&R Block.

Youth Volunteers from Seattle set up YVC’s first website and unveil it at the International Conference in Vero Beach, Florida.

- 2001: YVC develops new marketing materials including new brochures and a revamped website.
- 2002: YVC International Conference is held in Banff, Canada. The first time it has ever been held outside the United States.
- 2003: Ewing Marion Kauffman Foundation investment in YVC over the past 10 years tops $1,000,000.
- 2004: YVC receives its largest AmeriCorps grant ever—$680,000.
- 2005: The number of youth having served in a YVC service project tops 200,000.
- 2006: YVC launches a 20th Anniversary fundraising and marketing campaign.
- 2007: First Youth Summit to celebrate YVC's 20th Anniversary is held at Park University in Parkville, MO, with 150 attendees.
- 2008: YVC's 20th Anniversary Fundraising Campaign raises $3.9 million.
- 2009: Bank of America becomes YVC's first national corporate sponsor.
- 2010: YVC receives a Summer of Service grant awarding 400 Youth Volunteers $500 education awards for completing 100 hours of service.
- 2011: Adele Hall becomes YVC's board chair. Youth Volunteer Corps is named a Bank of America Neighborhood Builder and is awarded $200,000.
- 2012: YVC celebrated its 25th anniversary. YVC relocated its national headquarters to the historic Brockett House in the Quality Hill district of downtown Kansas City.
- 2013: Audrey Langworthy becomes YVC's board chair. YVC earns a Philly Award for excellence in nonprofit marketing for its identity campaign.
- 2014: YVC earns a Philly Award for its annual report.
- 2015: Jim Hise becomes YVC's board chair. YVC launches programs in 15 new communities, the most in any year in its history. YVC once again earns a Philly Award for its annual report and also receives the award for the best in-house campaign for a nonprofit with budget under $1 million.
