= Liquid-Plumr =

Chemical drain opener

Liquid-Plumr is a chemical drain opener made of 0.5–2% sodium hydroxide and 5–10% sodium hypochlorite, and a surfactant, produced by Clorox. The product is safe for septic systems, PVC, plastic, and copper pipes, although is not recommended for and can damage rubber piping.

The Liquid-Plumr products have a child-resistant closure that prevents leaking and potential harm. However, in 2016 Clorox issued a voluntary recall on products sold before March 21, 2016, due to failures with the child-resistant closure affecting about 5.4 million units with no injuries reported.

== History ==
Three months after Procter & Gamble acquired Clorox in 1957, the Federal Trade Commission sued under the Clayton Act. After a decade of legal battles, the United States Supreme Court ordered P&G to divest itself of Clorox. Clorox became an independent company again on January 2, 1969, and in April 1969, Clorox pooled all its available cash and credit to buy Liquid-Plumr drain opener.

== See also ==
- Drano, another comparable drain cleaning brand by S. C. Johnson & Son
