= Toilet cleaner =

Acidic cleaning agent for toilets

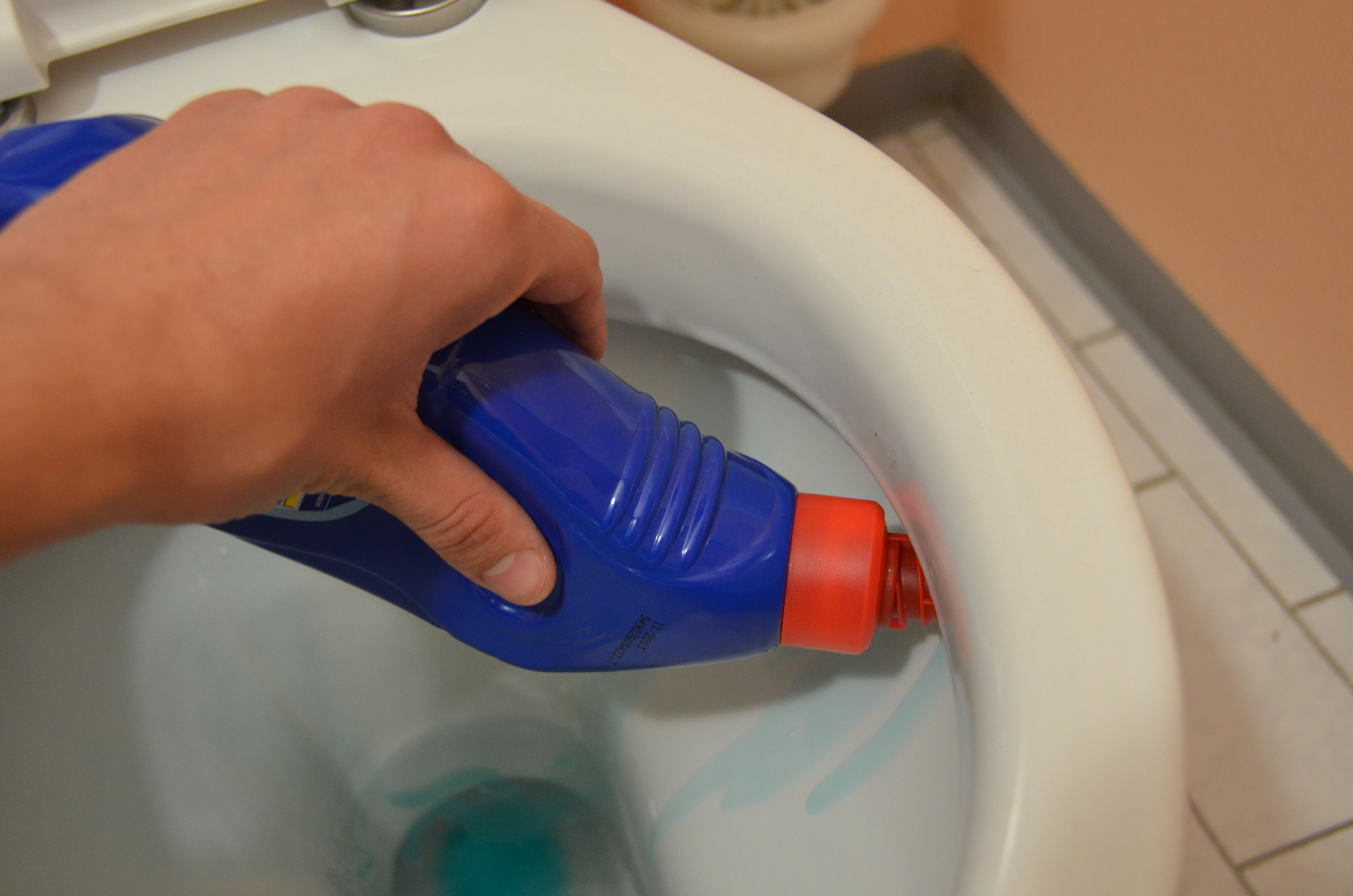
Application of toilet cleaner

Toilet cleaners are chemical solutions designed specifically for cleaning a toilet bowl, usually in conjunction with a toilet brush.

== Usage ==
Toilet cleaner is sprayed around the rim and into the bowl of the toilet prior to the use of the toilet brush. The toilet brush is used to scrub the toilet, removing stubborn stains and biological debris. In recent times, automatic toilet bowl cleaners that clip onto the rim of the toilet and clean with every flush have also become prevalent. In-tank toilet cleaning tablets are also available. Such tablets are placed in a toilet's tank, where they very slowly dissolve and thus add cleaners into the toilet water for a period of weeks.

Toilet cleaners tend to be toxic, as they contain disinfectants which can cause skin irritations. "Heavy duty" formulations often include hydrochloric acid (HCl) in varying amounts, necessitating care in handling and storage, as well as adequate ventilation while in use.

== Commercial brands ==
- Domestos
- Harpic
- Toilet Duck
- Lysol
- Poo-Pourri
- Sani-Flush
- Vanish

== See also ==
- Pumice stone, may be used for cleaning a hard water line
