= Purell =

American hand sanitizer brand

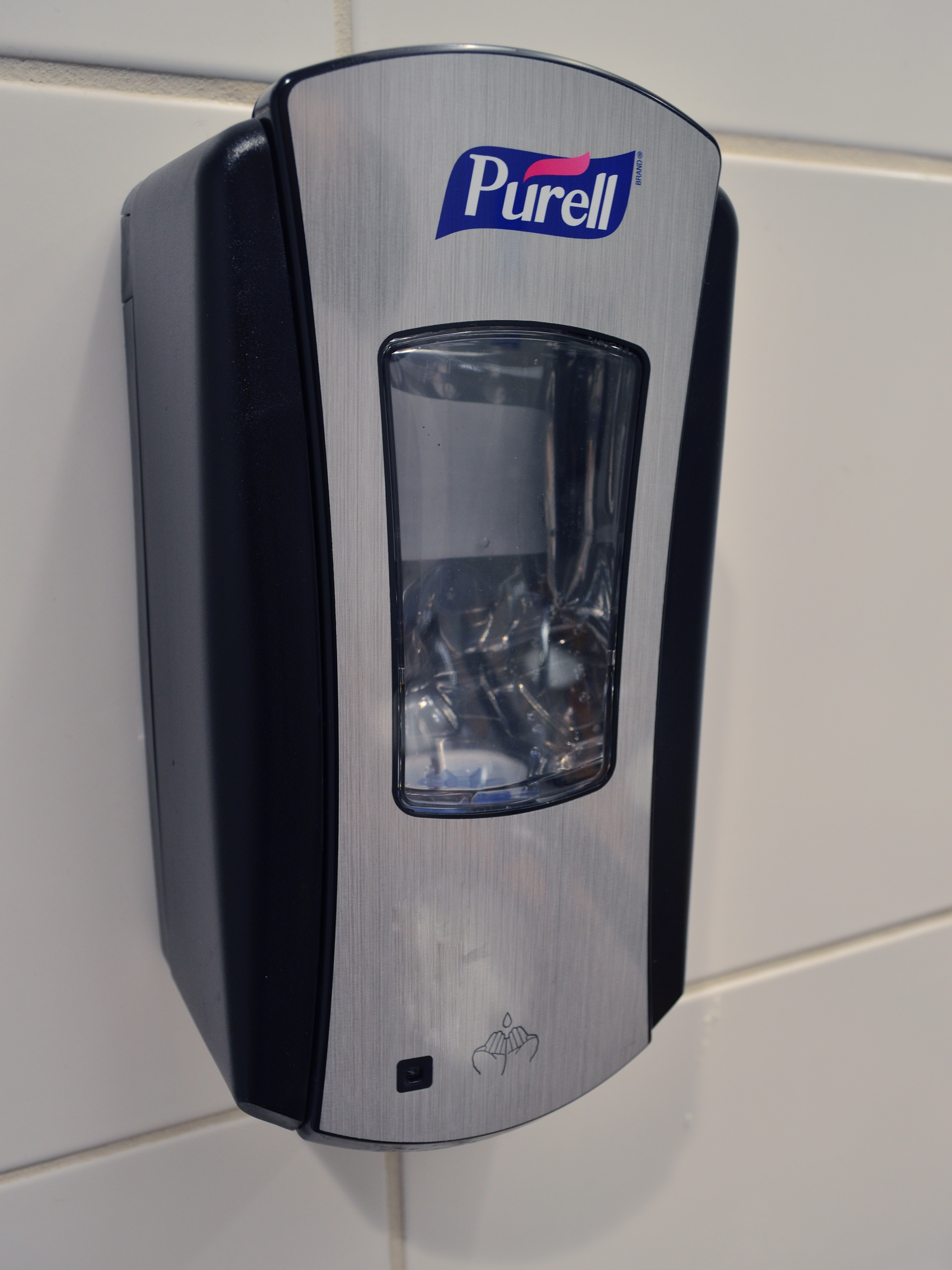
- Purell hand sanitizer
- Product type: Hand sanitizer
- Current owner: Gojo Industries
- Country: United States
- Introduced: 1997; 29 years ago
- Tagline: Imagine a touchable world
- Website: https://www.purell.com/

A bottle of Purell

Purell is an American brand of hand sanitizer invented in 1988, and introduced to the consumer market in 1997, by GOJO Industries. Its primary component is ethyl alcohol (70% v/v), and is used by wetting one's hands thoroughly with the product, then briskly rubbing one's hands together until dry.

Purell was acquired by Johnson & Johnson in 2006, then reacquired by GOJO in 2010. That year, Purell Green Certified Instant Hand Sanitizer became the first hand sanitizer to meet EcoLogo CCD-170 standards.

In early 2020, some of Purell's claims, including that it kills "99.99% of most common germs", have been met with regulatory warning to desist the claim.

During the 2020 COVID-19 pandemic, GOJO faced unprecedented demand for Purell products due to its reputation as a leading name-brand for hand sanitizer. Almost immediately, as cases began to rise in the United States, Purell products ran out-of-stock and remained largely unavailable to the general public, with new shipments being prioritized to medical and professional customers. Purell's products were still hard to find in July 2020, despite GOJO producing more than twice the amount of hand sanitizer in 2020 than in 2019. GOJO has stated it is currently investing in further strategies to source ingredients and substantially increase manufacturing space for use by mid-2021.

== Ownership and distribution ==
Pfizer acquired the exclusive rights to distribute Purell in the consumer market from GOJO Industries in 2004, and on June 26, 2006, Johnson & Johnson announced its acquisition of the Pfizer Consumer Healthcare division, which includes the Purell brand. In 2010, GOJO Industries bought the brand back from Johnson & Johnson.

== Health risks and claims ==
Purell adds an unpleasant bitter taste to its product to discourage ingestion. Since Purell has been available, the accidental or intentional ingestion of its products has been rare. The Chicago Tribune reported that children have become inebriated by ingesting Purell. One child's ingestion of the hand sanitizer caused her blood alcohol level to reach 0.218%; Purell contains 70% ethyl alcohol. The product packaging recommends that the product be "kept out of the reach of children".

Purell has been claimed to "[kill] more than 99.99% of most common germs that may cause illness in a healthcare setting, including MRSA & VRE." However, in January 2020, the Food and Drug Administration issued a warning to Purell's maker, GOJO Industries, to stop its claims that the product is effective at eliminating diseases because there are no peer-reviewed, published clinical studies demonstrating the company's claims.

The product is flammable, as mentioned in the product label. Besides ethyl alcohol, it contains Water, Isopropyl Alcohol, Caprylyl Glycol, Glycerin, Isopropyl Myristate, Tocopheryl Acetate, Acrylates/C10-30 Alkyl Acrylate Copolymer, Aminomethyl Propanol, & Fragrance.
