= Lauryldimethylamine oxide =

Names
- Preferred IUPAC name N,N-Dimethyldodecan-1-amine N-oxide
- Other names: Lauramine oxide; Dodecyldimethylamine oxide; Dimethyldodecylamine-N-oxide

Identifiers
CAS Number	1643-20-5
3D model (JSmol)	Interactive image
ChemSpider	14688
ECHA InfoCard	100.015.183
EC Number	216-700-6
PubChem CID	15433
UNII	4F6FC4MI8W
CompTox Dashboard (EPA)	DTXSID1020514
- InChI: InChI=1S/C14H31NO/c1-4-5-6-7-8-9-10-11-12-13-14-15(2,3)16/h4-14H2,1-3H3 Key: SYELZBGXAIXKHU-UHFFFAOYSA-N; InChI=1/C14H31NO/c1-4-5-6-7-8-9-10-11-12-13-14-15(2,3)16/h4-14H2,1-3H3 Key: SYELZBGXAIXKHU-UHFFFAOYAJ
- SMILES: CCCCCCCCCCCC[N+](C)(C)[O-]

Properties
Chemical formula	C_{14}H_{31}NO
Molar mass	229.408 g·mol^{−1}
Appearance	White solid
Density	0.996 g/ml
Melting point	132–133 °C (270–271 °F; 405–406 K)
Boiling point	320 °C (608 °F; 593 K)
- Surface tension
CMC	1.70 mM

Hazards
- GHS labelling
Pictograms	(GHS05: Corrosive)
Signal word	Danger
Hazard statements	H314
Precautionary statements	P280, P305+P351+P338, P310
- Safety data sheet (SDS)
- Except where otherwise noted, data are given for materials in their standard state (at 25 °C [77 °F], 100 kPa). verify (what is ?) Infobox references

Lauryldimethylamine oxide (LDAO), also known as dodecyldimethylamine oxide (DDAO), is an amine oxide–based zwitterionic surfactant, with a C_{12} (dodecyl) alkyl tail. It is one of the most frequently-used surfactants of this type. Like other amine oxide–based surfactants it is antimicrobial, being effective against common bacteria such as S. aureus and E. coli, however, it is also non-denaturing and can thus be used for protein purification.

At high concentrations, LDAO forms liquid crystalline phases. Despite having only one polar atom that is able to interact with water – the oxygen atom (the quaternary nitrogen atom is hidden from intermolecular interactions), DDAO is a strongly amphiphilic surfactant: it forms normal micelles and normal liquid crystalline phases. High amphiphilicity of this surfactant can be explained by the fact that it forms not only very strong hydrogen bonds with water: the energy of DDAO – water hydrogen bond is about 50 kJ/mol, but it also has high experimental partition coefficient in non-polar medium, as characterized by experimental logP 5.284

== See also ==
- Myristamine oxide – An analogous compound with a C_{14} tail
