= Caitlin Shetterly =

Writer and theatre director

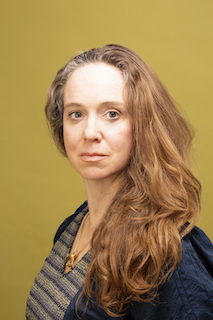
Caitlin Shetterly, American Writer

Caitlin Shetterly is an American writer and theatre director based in Maine whose works center on themes of the environment, food, America, family life, and motherhood. Her books include Pete and Alice in Maine (2023, HarperCollins); Modified: GMOs and the Threat to Our Food, Our Land, Our Future (2016); Made for You and Me: Going West, Going Broke, Finding Home (2011); and the bestselling Fault Lines: Stories of Divorce (2001). In 2003, Shetterly founded the Winter Harbor Theatre Company. She was artistic director until the company's closure in 2011. Shetterly is the Editor-in-Chief of Frenchly.us, a French culture and lifestyle publication.

== Early life and education ==
Shetterly graduated with Honors from Brown University in 1997 with a B.A. in English and American Literature. Her thesis focused on "Fathers and Children in Divorce" in John Updike's The Maples Stories and Richard Ford's Frank Bascombe novels. Updike became a mentor and friend of Shetterly's, a relationship she later wrote about in The New York Times.

== Career ==
After graduating from Brown, Shetterly moved to New York City in the fall of 1997, where writer Francine du Plessix Gray arranged for Shetterly to work as an assistant to photographer Richard Avedon at The New Yorker. She later worked at The New Yorker as a fact checker. Shetterly later wrote about the sexual harassment she was subjected to by a senior staff member at The New Yorker, who terminated her contract when she confronted him about the harassment.

In 2001, Shetterly edited and published her first book, a collection of short stories, called Fault Lines: Stories of Divorce (Putnam Berkley Group).

In 2003, Shetterly founded the Winter Harbor Theatre Company in Portland, Maine. With the company Shetterly created the "Letters Series...", a run of shows about social issues such as the Iraq War, Hurricane Katrina, and gun control. The shows were formed from original pieces which Shetterly commissioned from playwrights, including Craig Pospisil and Amy Fox, and artists across America. Each show brought the selected performers and playwrights together for one week in Maine where they rehearsed and performed.

From 2003 to 2007, Shetterly wrote a bimonthly dating column called Bramhall Square for the Portland Phoenix newspaper in Portland, ME.

In the spring of 2008, Shetterly started the blog Passage West, chronicling her move with her husband from Maine to Los Angeles, CA. In response to the 2008 recession, which Shetterly was blogging about, she was asked to create a series of audio diaries entitled The Recession Diaries for National Public Radio, which told her personal story of struggle with the recession. Both the audio diaries and her blog inspired her second book, a memoir, Made For You and Me: Going West, Going Broke, Finding Home (Voice, 2011), which made the Goodreads Choice Awards - Travel & Outdoors list.

After being diagnosed by an immunologist with a sensitivity to genetically modified corn, Shetterly wrote a 2013 piece in Elle called "The Bad Seed: The Health Risks of Genetically Modified Corn." The article received backlash from bio-chemical companies, who felt threatened by Shetterly's exploration of the relationships between pesticides, agriculture, health, and the environment, but Elle stood by Shetterly and her work. Her third book, Modified, which won the 2017 Maine Literary Award for Best Nonfiction, further explored the topic of genetically modified corn and related subjects.

Shetterly has been a frequent contributor to National Public Radio and has written for The New York Times, The New York Times Magazine, Elle, Self, Oprah.com, SheWrites.com, and Medium.com. She has been a contributor to This American Life, Studio 360, WNYC, WAMC, and Maine Public Radio, among other public radio outlets.

In the fall of 2021, Shetterly became editor-in-chief for the French culture and lifestyle publication, Frenchly, where she edits pieces about travel, arts, and culture.

== Personal life ==
Shetterly lives with her husband, photographer Daniel E. Davis, and their two sons in Maine.

Her parents, the painter Robert Shetterly and author Susan Hand Shetterly, both live in Maine. Her brother Aran Shetterly and sister-in-law Margot Lee Shetterly are also authors.
