= Clorox =

American global manufacturer and marketer based in Oakland, California

The Clorox Company

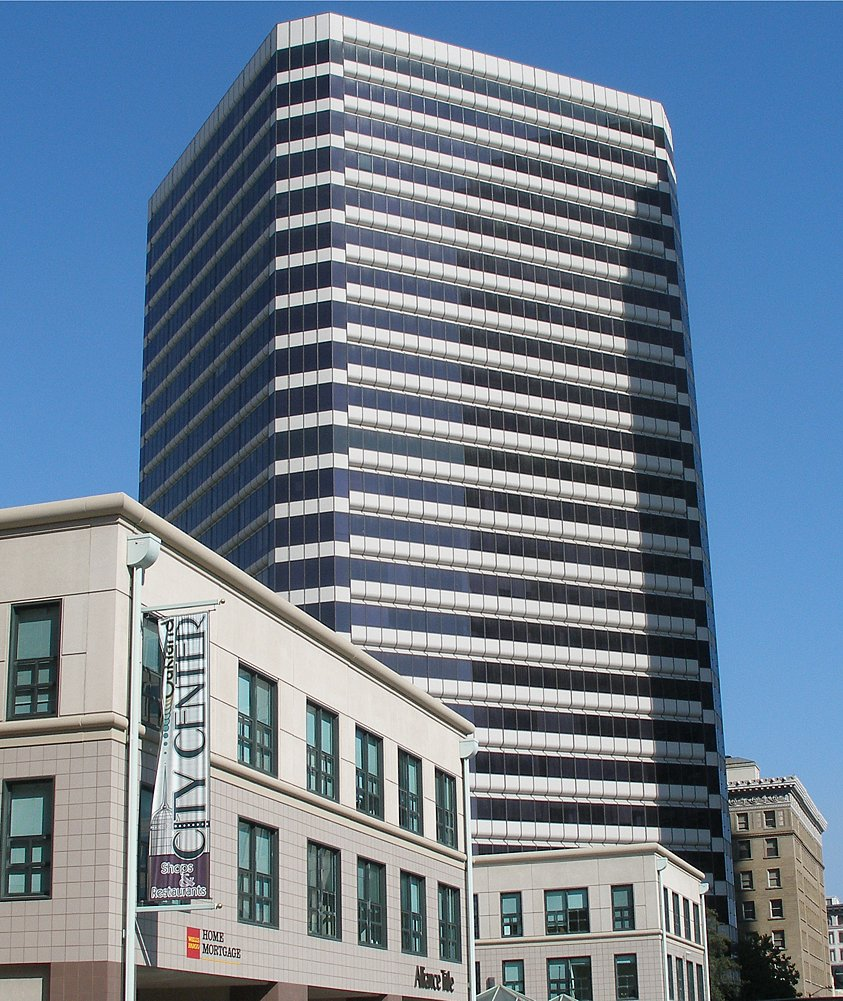
- Clorox Building, 1221 Broadway, Oakland, California, U.S.
- Formerly: Electro-Alkaline Company (1913–1928); Clorox Chemical Company (1928–1957)
- Type: Public
- Traded as: NYSE: CLX; S&P 500 component
- Industry: Consumer household goods; food; pet care; commercial cleaning
- Founded: May 3, 1913; 113 years ago
- Founders: Archibald Taft; Edward Hughes; Charles Husband; Rufus Myers; William Hussey
- Headquarters: Clorox Building, Oakland, California, U.S.
- Area served: Worldwide
- Key people: Linda Rendle (CEO)
- Products: Cleaning supplies; bags and wrap; foods, personal care; water filtration; grilling; pet care supplies
- Brands: Burt's Bees; Formula 409; Kitchen Bouquet; Kingsford; Lestoil; Liquid-Plumr; Pine-Sol; Hidden Valley Ranch; Fresh Step; Brita; Poett; Glad
- Revenue: ▲US$7.10 billion (2025)
- Operating income: ▲US$1.08 billion (2025)
- Net income: ▲US$810 million (2025)
- Total assets: ▼US$5.56 billion (2025)
- Total equity: ▼US$321 million (2025)
- Number of employees: 7,600 (2025)
- Website: thecloroxcompany.com

The Clorox Company (formerly Clorox Chemical Company) is an American multinational manufacturer and marketer of consumer and professional products. Clorox ranked annually on the Fortune 500 list from 2000 to 2024, where it last held the #485 spot.

Clorox products are sold primarily through mass merchandisers, retail outlets, e-commerce channels, distributors, and medical supply providers. Clorox brands include its namesake bleach and cleaning products as well as Burt's Bees, Formula 409, Glad, Hidden Valley, Kingsford, Kitchen Bouquet, KC Masterpiece, Liquid-Plumr, Brita (in the Americas), Mistolin, Pine-Sol, Poett, Green Works Cleaning Products, Soy Vay, Tilex, S.O.S., and Fresh Step, Scoop Away, and Ever Clean pet products.

== History ==
=== 1913–1927 ===
The Electro-Alkaline Company was founded on May 3, 1913, as the first commercial-scale liquid bleach manufacturer in the United States. Archibald Taft, a banker; Edward Hughes, a purveyor of wood and coal; Charles Husband, a bookkeeper; Rufus Myers, a lawyer; and William Hussey, a miner, each invested $100 to set up a factory on the east side of San Francisco Bay. The name of its original product, Clorox, was coined as a portmanteau of its two main ingredients, chlorine and sodium hydroxide. The original Clorox packaging featured a diamond-shaped logo, which has been used in one form or another in Clorox branding ever since.

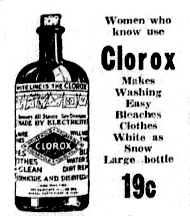
1922 Clorox bleach advertisement, The Seattle Star, June 9, 1922

The public, however, was unfamiliar with liquid bleach. The company started slowly and was on the brink of collapse when investor William Murray took it over in 1916, who installed himself as general manager. His wife Annie prompted the creation of a less concentrated liquid bleach for home use and built customer demand by giving away 15-US-fluid-ounce (440 ml) sample bottles at the family's grocery store in downtown Oakland. Word shortly began to spread, and in 1917 the company started shipping Clorox bleach to the East Coast via the Panama Canal.

=== 1928–1960s ===
On May 28, 1928, the company went public on the San Francisco stock exchange. It changed its name to Clorox Chemical Company. An animated Clorox liquid bleach bottle, named Butch, was used in its advertising and became well known, even surviving the 1940 transition from rubber-stoppered bottles to screw-off caps.

Even though bleach was a valuable first aid product for American armed forces during World War II, government rationing of chlorine gas forced many bleach manufacturers to reduce the concentration of sodium hypochlorite in their products. Clorox, however, declined and elected to sell fewer units of full-strength bleach, establishing a reputation for quality.

In 1957, Clorox was purchased by Procter & Gamble, which renamed its new subsidiary the Clorox Company. Almost immediately, a rival company objected to the purchase, and it was challenged by the Federal Trade Commission, which feared it would stifle competition in the household products market. The FTC prevailed in 1967 when the U.S. Supreme Court forced Procter & Gamble to divest Clorox, which took place on January 1, 1969.

=== 1970s–1990s ===
Throughout the 1970s and 1980s, Clorox pursued an aggressive expansion and diversification program. In 1970, the company introduced Clorox 2 all-fabric bleach. Later it acquired several brands that remain a part of its portfolio, including Formula 409, Liquid-Plumr, and Kingsford charcoal. The company also developed new cleaning products such as Tilex instant mildew remover. It also acquired the "Hidden Valley" brand of ranch dressing.

In 1988, Clorox struck a licensing-and-distribution agreement that brought Brita water filters to the U.S. The company acquired sole control of the brand for the U.S. and Canada in 1995 when it acquired Brita International Holdings (Canada). In 2000, it secured the remaining Americas market from Brita.

In 1990, Clorox purchased Pine-Sol. In 1999, Clorox acquired First Brands, the former consumer products division of Union Carbide, in the largest transaction in its history. Such brands as Glad, Handi-Wipes (which First Brands acquired from Colgate-Palmolive several months before the Clorox acquisition), and STP became part of the Clorox portfolio. The First Brands acquisition doubled the company's size and helped it land on the Fortune 500 for the first time the following year.

=== 2000s–present ===
In 2002, Clorox entered into a joint venture with Procter & Gamble to create food and trash bags, food wraps, and containers under the names Glad, GladWare, and related trademarks. As part of this agreement, Clorox sold a 10% stake in the Glad products to P&G, which increased to 20% in 2005. In February, 2026, the two companies dissolved the joint venture, with Clorox purchasing the 20% share previously held by P&G.

In 2007, the company acquired Burt's Bees. In 2010, Clorox shed businesses that were no longer a good strategic fit for the company, announcing that it was selling the Armor All and STP brands to Avista Capital Partners. In 2011, Clorox acquired the Aplicare and HealthLink brands, bolstering its presence in the healthcare industry. In 2008, the Clorox Company became the first major consumer packaged goods company to develop and nationally launch a green cleaning line, Green Works, into the mainstream cleaning aisle. In 2011, the Clorox Company integrated corporate social responsibility (CSR) reporting with financial reporting. The company's annual report for the fiscal year ending in June 2011 shared data on financial performance and advances in environmental, social, and governance performance.

In 2013, the company announced a focus on consumer megatrends that included sustainability, health and wellness, affordability and value, and multiculturalism, with a particular emphasis on the Hispanic community. In 2015, the company became a signatory of the United Nations Global Compact, a large corporate responsibility initiative. In 2018, Clorox purchased Nutranext Business, LLC for approximately $700 million. Florida-based Nutranext makes natural multivitamins, specialty minerals used as health aids, and supplements for hair, skin and nails. Clorox was named to the inaugural Bloomberg Gender Equality Index in 2018. The following year, it topped the Axios Harris Poll 100 corporate reputation rankings.

In 2019, Clorox ranked seventh in Barron's "100 Most Sustainable U.S. Companies" list. In 2022, the company opened a new manufacturing facility in Martinsburg, West Virginia, to facilitate the growth of its cat litter business. In 2023 the company was affected by a cyberattack, resulting in revenue loss and product shortages. In January 2026, Clorox agreed to buy Gojo Industries—maker of Purell—for $2.25 billion in an all-cash deal. On May 28, 2026, Clorox announced Linda Rendle, its CEO since 2020, was stepping down due to health reasons and following a diagnosis of breast cancer. In October 2026, the company announced Fabian Garcia as its next CEO.

== Brands ==
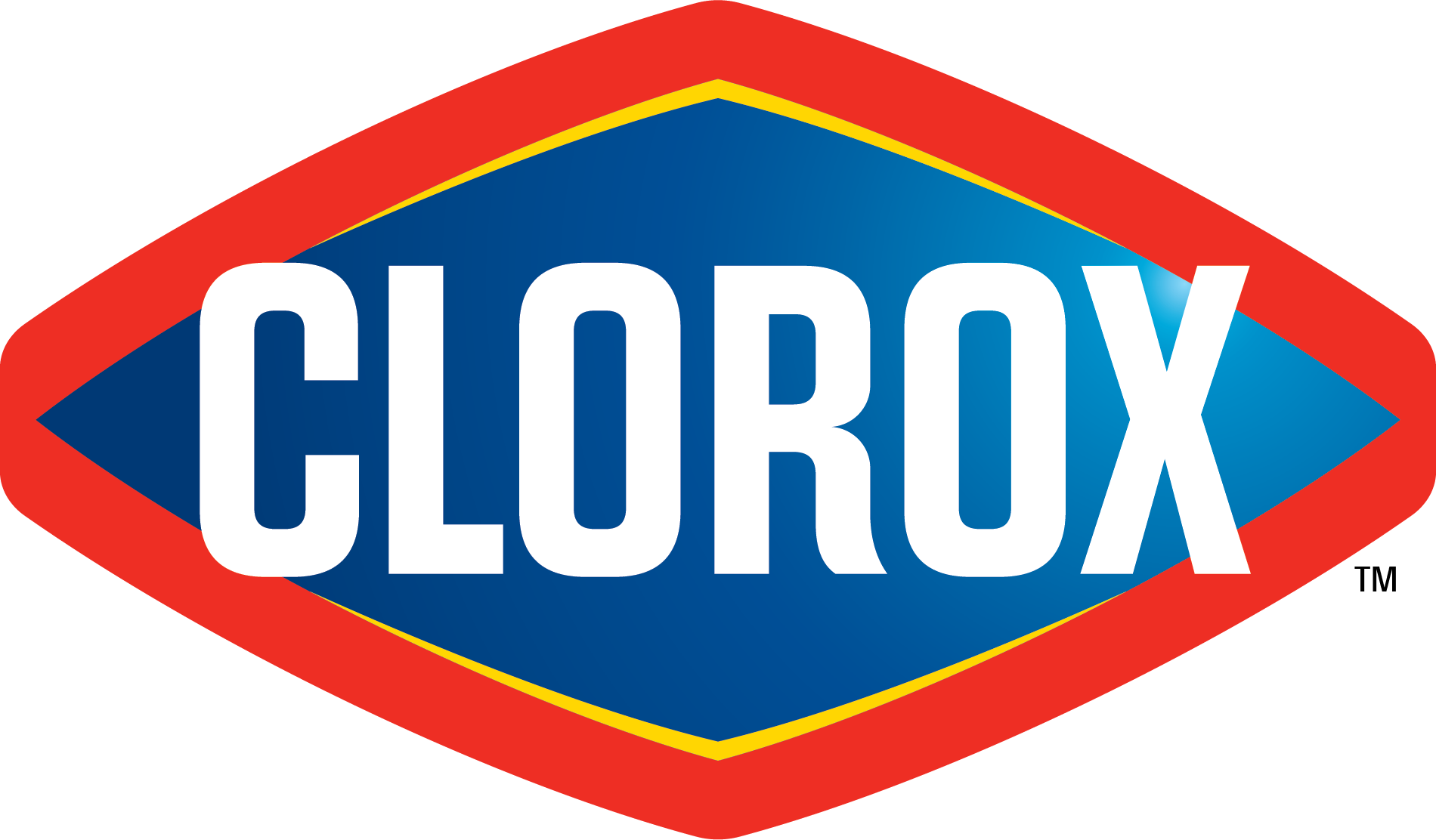
Clorox logo for consumer brands (not to be confused with the corporate mark)

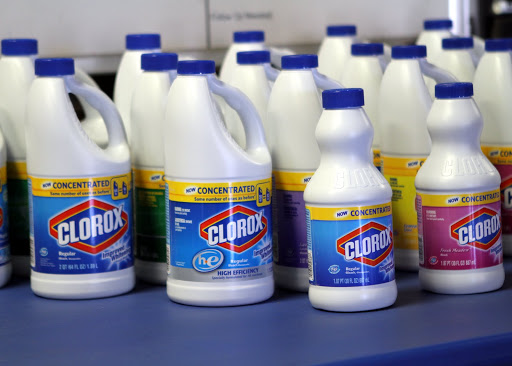
Clorox products

The Clorox Company currently owns a number of well-known household and professional brands in a wide variety of products, including:

- Brita water filtration systems (Americas only)
- Burt's Bees natural cosmetics and personal care products
- Clorinda bleach and cleaning and disinfection products, alternative brand of Clorox Chile
- Ever Clean cat litters
- Formula 409 hard surface cleaners
- Fresh Step, Scoop Away, cat litters
- Glad storage bags, trash bags, Press'n Seal, GladWare containers (joint venture with P&G as 20-percent minority shareholder)
- Green Works natural cleaners
- Handy Andy floor cleaners in Australia
- Hidden Valley dressings, sandwich spreads and condiments, dips and dressing mixes, croutons and salad toppings, side dishes and appetizers
- Kingsford charcoal
- Kitchen Bouquet, KC Masterpiece, and Soy Vay sauces
- Lestoil heavy-duty laundry and multipurpose cleaner
- Liquid-Plumr drain cleaner
- Pine-Sol, Tilex, Poett, and S.O.S cleaning products
- Purell, hand sanitizer (pending acquisition)
- Gojo, heavy-duty hand cleaners and soaps (pending acquisition)
- Provon, soaps and sanitizers for healthcare industry (pending acquisition)

The company's bleach products are sold under regional brands. In 2006, Clorox acquired the Canadian Javex line of bleach products from Colgate-Palmolive, and similar product lines in parts of Latin and South America.

== Sales ==
The company ranked as a Fortune 500 company from 2000 through 2024.

Clorox's net sales (FY 2015–2025)

	FY 2025	FY 2024	FY 2023	FY 2022	FY 2021	FY 2020	FY 2019	FY 2018	FY 2017	FY 2016	FY 2015
U.S. dollars (in millions)	$7,104	$7,093	$7,389	$7,107	$7,341	$6,721	$6,214	$6,124	$5,973	$5,761	$5,655

== Marketing ==
=== Advertising campaigns ===
In 1986, the advertising campaign for Clorox 2 featured an award-winning jingle, "Mama's Got The Magic of Clorox 2". The song was written by Dan Williams and performed by Dobie Gray. The company was listed at Advertising Age's 2015 Marketer A-List.

=== Criticisms of sexist marketing ===
During 2006 and 2007, a Clorox commercial that aired nationally showed several generations of women doing laundry. The commercial included the words "Your mother, your grandmother, her mother, they all did the laundry, maybe even a man or two". Feminists criticized the commercial for insinuating that doing laundry is a job for women only.

The Clorox slogan, "Mama's got the magic of Clorox", was criticized on similar grounds. The slogan first appeared in a Clorox commercial in 1986. A modified version of the commercial ran from 2002 to 2004.

In 2009, Clorox received complaints of sexism for an advertisement that featured a man's white, lipstick-stained dress shirt with the caption, "Clorox. Getting ad guys out of hot water for generations". The ad, and others, were produced expressly for the television program Mad Men, capitalizing on "the show's unique vintage style to [create] a link between classic and modern consumer behaviors".

=== Reactions to product claims ===
==== Green Works ====
In 2008, the Sierra Club endorsed the Clorox Green Works line. Sierra Club Executive Director Carl Pope stated that one of the nonprofit organization's primary goals is to "foster vibrant, healthy communities with clean water and air that are free from pollution. Products like Green Works help to achieve this goal in the home". The Sierra Club also partnered with Clorox to "promote a line of natural cleaning products for consumers who are moving toward a greener lifestyle". The partnership "caused schisms" in the club, which contributed in part to Pope's decision to resign. Also in 2008, the National Advertising Division told Clorox to either discontinue or modify its advertisements for Green Works on the grounds the cleaners actually do not work as well as traditional cleaners, as Clorox had claimed.

In 2009, Clorox received further criticism for its Clorox Green Works line, regarding claims the products are environmentally friendly. Several Clorox Green Works products contain ethanol, which environmental groups state is neither cost-effective nor eco-friendly. Many Green Works products also contain sodium lauryl sulfate, a known skin irritant. Women's Voices for the Earth have questioned whether or not the Clorox Green Works line is greenwashing, as Clorox's "green" products are far outnumbered by their traditional products, asking "Why sell one set of products that have hazardous ingredients and others that don't?"

==== Animal testing ====
In 2019, Clorox announced that they do not participate in animal testing except where required by law. This prompted backlash from animal advocacy organizations like PETA, who claimed that Clorox was perpetuating animal testing by choosing to sell their products in markets where inhumane animal testing was required, such as China.

== See also ==
- List of companies based in Oakland, California
