= AEM =

AEM or A.E.M. may refer to:

== Companies, groups, organizations ==
- Agencia Espacial Mexicana (English: Mexican Space Agency), the national space agency of Mexico
- Agnico Eagle Mines Limited, a Canadian-based gold producer
- Association of Equipment Manufacturers, a US-based trade association
- Charles H. Dyson School of Applied Economics and Management (AEM) at Cornell University in Ithaca, New York
- Societé d'Application Electro-Mécanique (AEM), manufacturer of the AEM (1924 automobile)

== Engineering, science and technology ==
- AEM rubber, an ethylene acrylic rubber
- Adobe Experience Manager, a suite of digital marketing software products
- Airborne Electro-Magnetic (AEM) waves, discovered by Heinrich Hertz and predicted by James Clerk Maxwell's equations of electromagnetism
- Alkaline earth metal, the 6 chemical elements in group 2 of the periodic table
- α-Ethylmescaline, a psychedelic drug
- Analytic element method, a numerical technique
- Anion exchange membrane, a type of semipermeable membrane used in fuel cells
- Applications Explorer Mission, part of the Explorer program
- Applied and Environmental Microbiology, a scientific research journal
- Applied element method, a method of structural analysis
- Atlantic Equatorial mode, a climate pattern of the tropical Atlantic Ocean
- EMD AEM-7 locomotive

== Other uses ==
- Australian Eastern Mission, 1934 diplomatic tour
- AEM (1987 automobile), a Welsh-built version of the Mini-Moke
- AEM (1924 automobile), a French electric car
- Amgu Airport in Primorsky Krai, Russia (IATA airport code AEM)
- Arem language (ISO 639-3 code: aem), an endangered Austro-Asiatic language of South-East Asia
- Associate Emergency Manager, a certification conferred by the International Association of Emergency Managers
- Automated efficiency model, a mathematical model used in real estate
- Aviation Electrician's Mate, a rating of the U.S. Navy
