= Radial shaft seal =

Machinery component

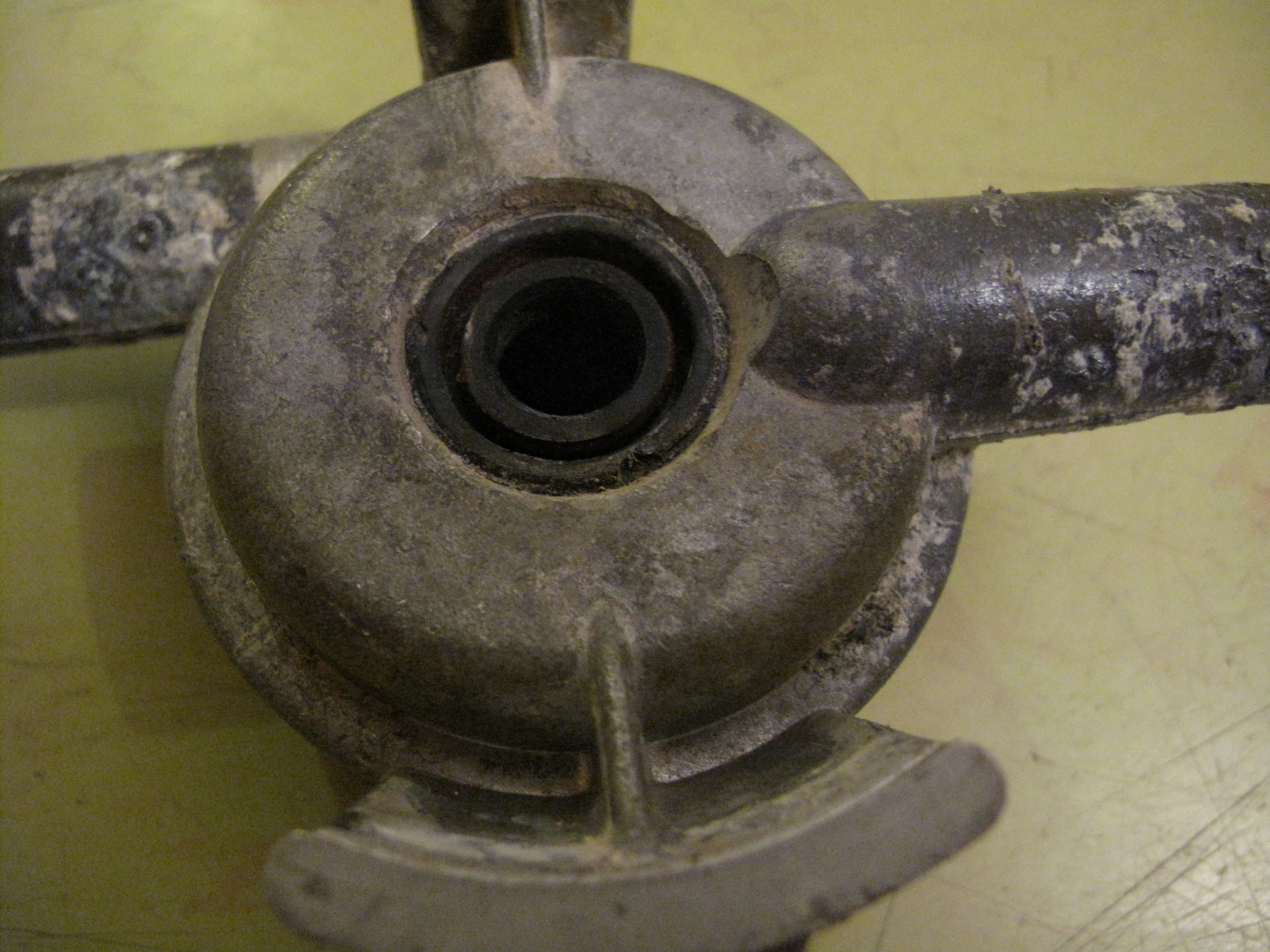
Radial shaft seal of Romo washing machine pump

Radial shaft seals, also known as rotary lip seals, are used to seal rotary elements, such as a shaft or rotating bore. Common examples include strut seals, hydraulic pump seals, axle seals, power steering seals, and valve stem seals. Early radial shaft seals utilized rawhide as the sealing element, and many present-day elastomeric seal companies were once tanneries. As the advent of modern elastomers replaced rawhide, manufacturers also added a garter spring, which helps the sealing lip compensate for lip wear and elastomer material changes.

The seal construction consists of a sprung main sealing lip which has a line contact with the shaft. The line contact is formed by two angles, with the air-side angle usually less than the oil-side angle. Depending on the seal type, these two angles are varied to create a pressure distribution at the seal contact line which has a steeper slope on the oil side of the seal. The shallower the slope on the oil side of the seal, the wetter the seal will run. The spring is positioned such that axially the centerline of the spring is biased to the air side of the lip contact line. These seals can be designed with a wide range of lip configurations to optimize lubrication retention and contaminant exclusion.

In order to exclude contaminants, numerous types of dust lips or exclusionary lips may be used. Common elastomers include FKM, ACM, NBR, HNBR, and AEM. In order to resist wear, the compounds' durometer (hardness) is typically 70 to 85 Shore A (medium-hard, between that of an automobile tire and a leather belt).

A different seal design for similar applications is a rotating face seal.

== Simmerring ==
A commonly used expression is "Simmerring". This product name and Simmer-Ring are trademarks of Freudenberg Sealing Technologies.

Simmerring is derived from the name of the developer, the Austrian engineer Walther Simmer, who worked for Freudenberg. The first development 1929 in Kufstein Tirol Austria consisted of leather and metal.

== Standards ==
Standards and other documents relating to radial shaft seals

- ISO 6194-1:1982 Rotary shaft lip type seals – Nominal dimensions and tolerances
- ISO 6194-2:1991 Rotary shaft lip type seals – Vocabulary
- ISO 6194-3:1988 Rotary shaft lip type seals – Storage, handling and installation
- ISO 6194-4:1988 Rotary shaft lip type seals – Performance test procedures
- ISO 6194-5:1990 Rotary shaft lip type seals – Identification of visual imperfections
- SAE J946-1989 Application Guide to Radial Lip Seals
- RMA OS-4, 1984 Application Guide for Radial Lip Type Shaft Seals
- RMA OS-7, 1982 Storage and Handling Guide for Radial Lip Type Shaft Seals
- RMA OS-8, 1977 Visual Variations Guide for Rotating Shaft Seals
- DIN 3760 Radial-Wellendichtringe (Radial shaft seals)
- DIN 3761 Radial-Wellendichtringe für Kraftfahrzeuge (Motor Vehicles Radial shaft seals), Parts 1-15. This standard covers all aspects including vocabulary, material requirements and test methods.
- GOST 8752-79. CIS standard for rotary shaft seals.

== See also ==
- Stuffing box
- Gland seal
