= Reel trailer =

Utility construction equipment

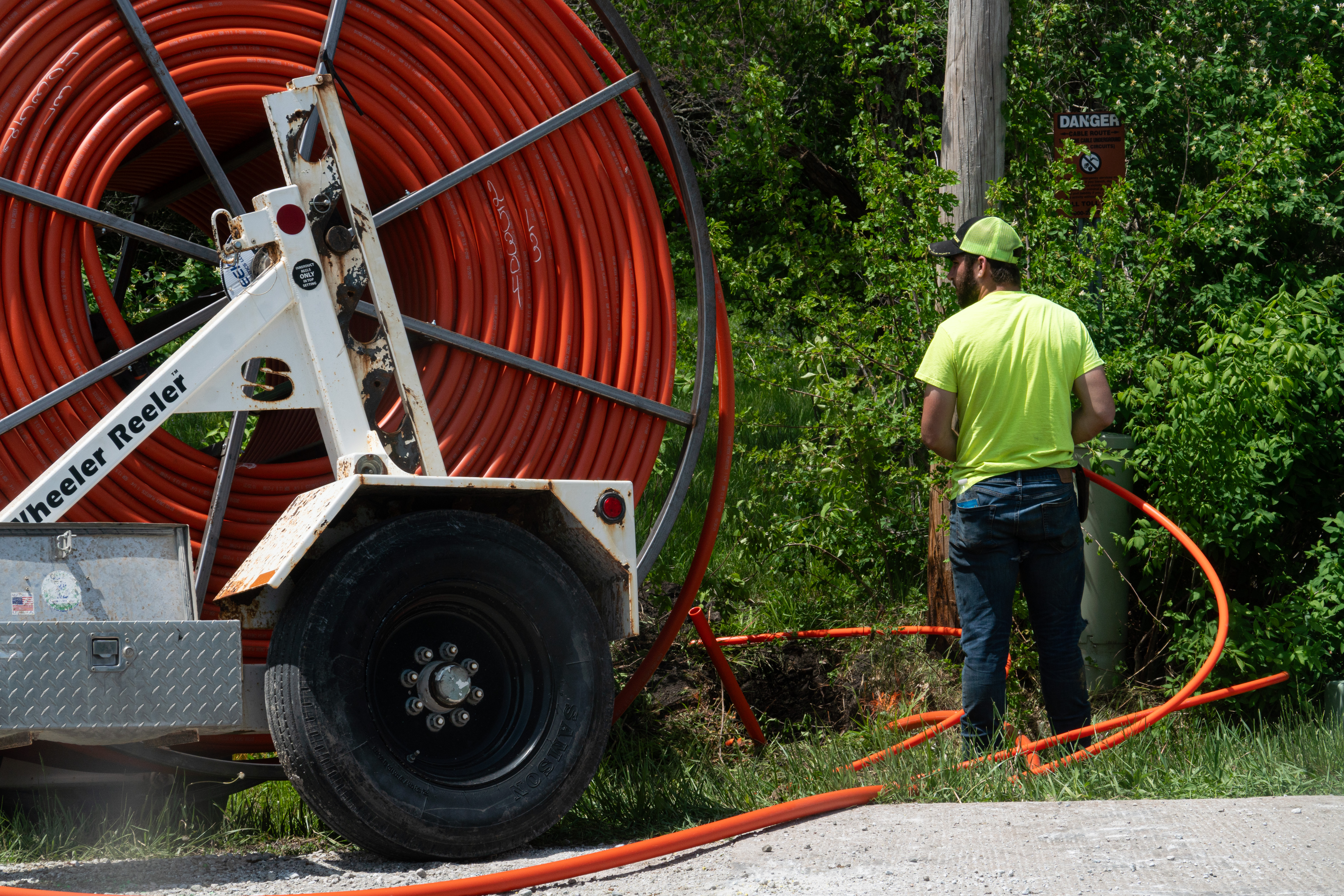
A utility worker holds conduit next to reel trailer

A reel trailer is a piece of utility construction equipment towed by a powered vehicle like a truck. It is commonly used to transport spools of fiber, copper, conduit and electrical cable. The key feature that distinguishes reel trailers from other trailers is that they use a metal bar that runs through the center of the spool, suspending it above the trailer frame. This allows the spool to spin freely, and brakes may also be used to prevent the spool from moving. The reel can be controlled to allow the cabling to pay out.

As early as 1923, it was reported that a "reel trailer is now generally used in place of the temporary platform and jacks" for installing aerial cables. Reel trailers come in various configurations, from single-reel models for smaller operations to multi-reel designs that hold multiple spools for larger projects. Some models without hydraulic systems require lifts or cranes to move spools on and off the trailer. Some trailers use hydraulic lifting mechanisms to raise and lower the spools without the need of external equipment. Historic uses of reel trailers include rail-mounted models for electrical tools used in mining.

Reel trailers are not intended to transport riders or passengers.
