= Electrification and controls technology =

Electrification and controls technology are devices that control, service and enhance productivity of industrial handling. Controls interface with hardware such as receivers, cranes and hoists, through a network in order to ensure that equipment operates safely and effectively. Almost every business, including the food, chemical, and automobile industries, uses controls. Some examples of these gadgets are:

- Remote controls
- Festooning
- Drives
- Motors
- Conductor bars
- Anti-collision devices
- Weighing devices
- Brakes
- Resistors
- Cabling

== Industry definitions ==
Conductor bar: Insulated energized rails that safely provide power, control and data to moving equipment from a fixed source, much like electric rails on a model train.

Festoon system: A cable management system of rolling trolleys that properly support power, control and data cables to moving equipment from a fixed source.

Cable reel: A cable management device designed to spool and store electrical power, control or data cable, as the equipment moves along its path of motion.

Variable-frequency drive: A type of static controller that safely drives an electric motor by varying the frequency and voltage the motor is supplied. This device minimizes the wear and tear of the mechanical system while allowing precise control and maximizing operator safety.

Radio remote control: Allows an operator to control different types of moving equipment and cranes, meanwhile, providing the operator the best vantage point to the load or operation and physical position for a safe working area.

Load brake: A device used to safely stop linear or rotating motion of equipment through the use of power or friction.
