= Freudenberg Group =

German group of companies

Freudenberg SE

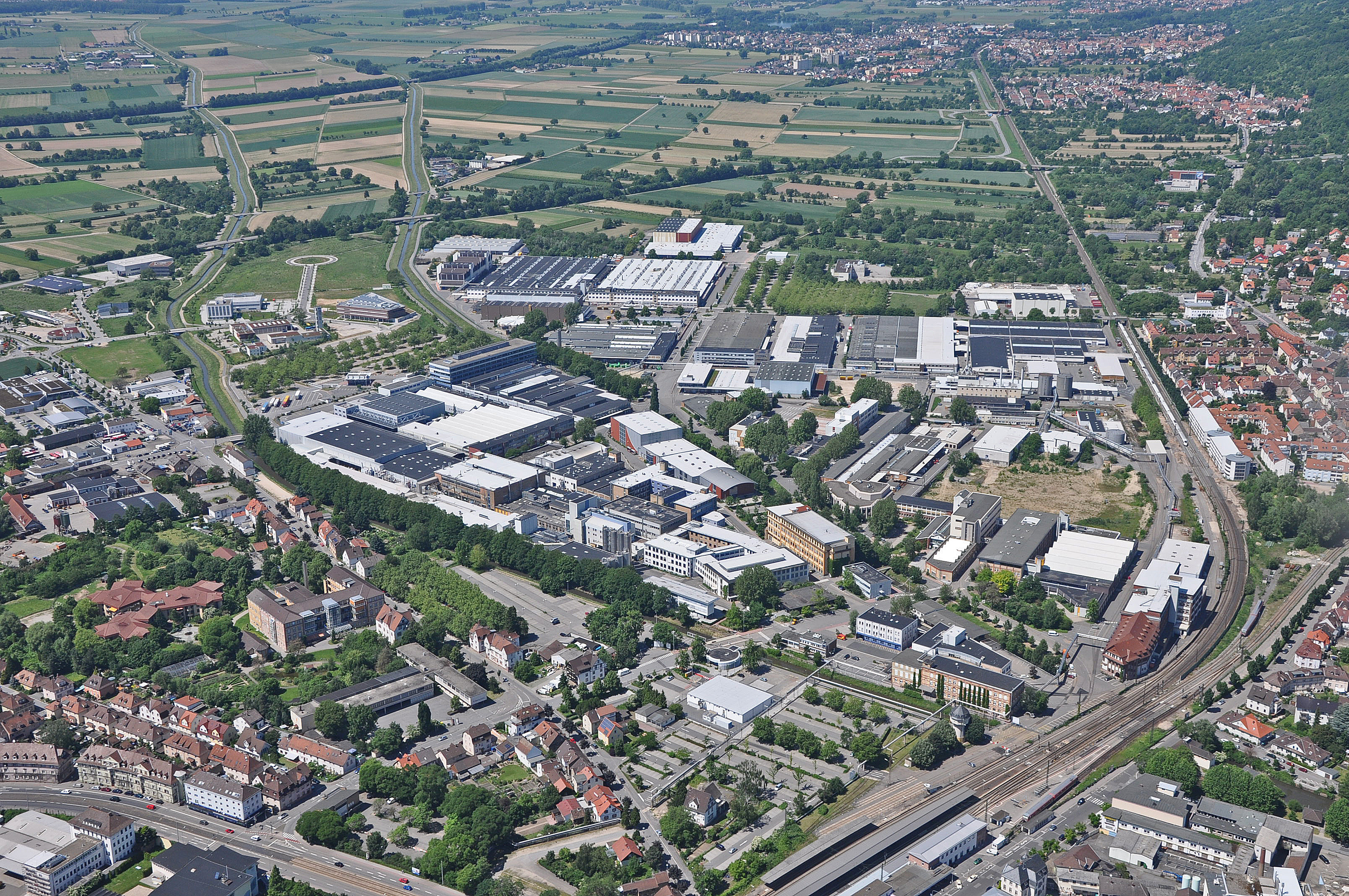
- Freudenberg Group headquarters in Weinheim, aerial view (2010)
- Type: Family-owned; Societas Europaea
- Industry: Conglomerate
- Founded: 9 February 1849; 177 years ago
- Founder: Carl Johann Freudenberg
- Headquarters: Weinheim, Baden-Wuerttemberg, Germany
- Area served: Worldwide
- Key people: Claus Möhlenkamp (CEO)
- Products: Household and other products
- Revenue: ▲€11.732 billion (2025)
- Number of employees: 50,968 (2025)
- Website: freudenberg.com

The Freudenberg Group is a German family-owned diversified group of companies whose products include housewares and cleaning products, automobile parts, textiles, building materials, speciality chemicals and medical products. Its headquarters are in Weinheim, Baden-Württemberg, and it has production facilities around the world. The parent company was founded in 1849 as a tannery, and until the end of the 1920s produced only leather.

== History ==
=== Origins to 1933 ===
The company was founded on 9 February 1849 by Carl Johann Freudenberg and Heinrich Christian Heintze. After his father's early death, Freudenberg had been apprenticed to his uncle Johann Baptist Sammet, a leather merchant in Mannheim, and had become a silent partner in the company co-owned by Heintze and Sammet. That company fell into financial difficulties during the upheavals of the German revolution and was liquidated in 1848; the following year Freudenberg and Heintze took over a tannery at Weinheim where Freudenberg had been employed, and introduced lacquered patent leather as a speciality. The product won bronze medals at the international expositions of 1851 and 1853 and a silver medal in 1855, and sold well. For the next 80 years, the company produced exclusively various kinds of leather.

Heintze died in 1862; on the death in 1874 of his son Leopold Heintze, who had become a partner in the early 1850s, the Freudenberg family bought his share in the business from his heirs and renamed it to Carl Freudenberg. Carl Johann Freudenberg had placed his eldest son, Friedrich Carl Freudenberg, in charge of a second tannery in Schönau, which opened in 1869; his youngest son, Hermann Ernst Freudenberg, apprenticed and was a journeyman in the United States and after his return in 1875 introduced a better production process for the lacquered patent leather. The company became a GmbH in 1896, and following Carl Johann Freudenberg's death in 1898, the brothers succeeded him at its head, with Hermann Ernst Freudenberg, who had bought out their sisters' interests in the company, being the dominant partner.

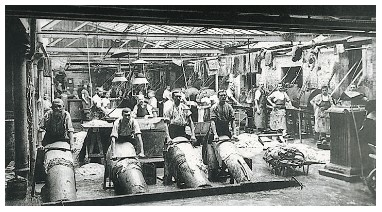
Removal of hair from raw hides in the Freudenberg tannery, c. 1899

With the introduction at the turn of the century of the faster and better chrome tanning process developed in the United States, by 1914 Freudenberg had become one of the four largest leather processing firms in Germany, importing hides from the Russian Empire, Poland, Argentina, France, and the United States and exporting finished leather to markets including the British Empire, Switzerland, France, Russia, Poland, the United States, and Latin America. Like the rest of the German leather industry, the company was hurt by World War I, especially by the stoppage of imports of hides under the Allied embargo and a subsequent ban that was not officially lifted until 1924, and also by bureaucratic controls. Under the Weimar Republic, inflation and the devaluation of the German currency hindered international business; in order to pay for imported raw materials in hard currency, Freudenberg partnered with Swiss bankers to establish Externa S.A., a credit agency in Lausanne. The company also participated in a number of cooperative agreements to facilitate exports, and skirted regulations in Poland and Eastern Europe by representing German and Austrian leather as Swiss products of its Tannerie de Lausanne subsidiary. By 1929, the company was once more exporting 70% of its production, but the worldwide economic depression that began late that year, and the high taxes that many countries imposed on imports in response, further damaged the German leather industry. Freudenberg, also affected by patent leather falling out of fashion, cut hours to avoid layoffs. In 1929, seeking to rebuild international trade, it formed a United States subsidiary in Boston.

=== Nazi era ===
In 1933 the company acquired Conrad Tack & Cie, a shoe manufacturer and retailer founded in 1883. This was one of the first Aryanizations of a Jewish-owned company in the Third Reich; in the face of boycotts Hermann Krojanker, the company head, requested that Freudenberg, the company's major supplier, take it over. It was Freudenberg's first expansion into both manufacturing and consumer sales; the company subsequently "Aryanized" a dozen other companies, including other shoe manufacturers and sellers which were incorporated into Tack, and other leather processors including Sigmund Hirsch GmbH, which was also in Weinheim and specialised in horse leather, and Josef Reiman / Gerhardus, an amalgamation of two Vienna companies. As the Reich expanded, Freudenberg sought to acquire companies in annexed and occupied countries. They were unsuccessful in acquiring Del-Ka, a leading Viennese shoe company, or any of the shoe companies in Czechoslovakia and Poland; Nazi administrators in the east sought to avoid further increasing the market share of leading German companies, and the Czech company Bata was permitted to retain all its shoe shops since it was a valued provider of military footwear. In the west, Foreign Ministry policy was to promote German industrial expansion, and Freudenberg was able to acquire Chromex, a French manufacturer of vehicle seals that had been established with financial assistance from Freudenberg in 1934 and licensed Freudenberg technology; but Freudenberg abandoned attempts to "Aryanize" a leather producer in the Netherlands on grounds of likely bureaucratic veto, were passed over in the "Aryanization" of a Luxembourg tannery, and were also rebuffed in their attempts to acquire either regional outlets or the whole company of the French shoe company André, which survived the war without being "Aryanized".

With a view to diversification, Freudenberg began in the late 1920s to research industrial uses for leather. In 1929, the company began to produce leather cuff seals for motors. The Austrian engineer Walther Simmer developed an improved radial shaft seal that was patented in 1932 as the Simmerring. In the second half of the 1930s, the company changed from leather to synthetic rubber for the Simmerring. Nazi restrictions and subsequently World War II led to renewed stoppages of leather imports and to other shortages; in response the company accelerated its diversification away from leather and into components for machinery. Starting in 1936, chemist Carl Ludwig Nottebohm developed his patented concept of nonwovens at Freudenberg, leading to an artificial leather product on a nonwoven base that the company named Viledon and marketed for bags and luggage.

In 1936, Freudenberg developed synthetic rubber shoe soles; marketed from 1938 under the brand name nora, they were the first commercially available synthetic rubber soles. (Freudenberg spun off production of the nora shoe soles in 1998, and the subsidiary manufacturing other nora products in 2007; it is now Nora systems). In 1937, the company instituted testing of artificial shoe soles by a group of test walkers, initially consisting mostly of former workers. They became a noted sight in and around Weinheim, and one man walked 40,000 kilometres (25,000 mi) over the course of three years. In November 1939, Richard Freudenberg proposed that German footwear manufacturers set up centralised testing on this model, using as testers Reich Labor Service workers undergoing military training. The manufacturers agreed on quality and testing standards, but the central use testing system that was instituted under government oversight in 1940 was a shoe test track at the Sachsenhausen concentration camp. Prisoners were assigned to walk more than 30 kilometres (19 mi), later more than 40 kilometres (25 mi) daily, testing sample pairs submitted by the manufacturers. Some were assigned the task as punishment by the SS; some were required to walk carrying heavy burdens; an unknown number died.

=== Since World War II ===
The development of artificial materials for both footwear and automotive uses led to fabrics and, when it was noted that the company's cleaning women were using discarded scraps of the experimental fabrics for cleaning. Vileda (from German: wie Leder, 'like leather') window-cleaning cloths were first marketed in 1948; the name had originally been suggested for the first non-woven product, Viledon.In the first postwar decades, houseware became a major focus for Freudenberg, together with non-woven for the textile industry. The company internationalized; it opened production facilities in other countries, beginning in 1950 with a textile plant in Lowell, Massachusetts and continuing in the 1970s and 1980s with plants in Brazil, Japan, and Hong Kong, and partnered particularly with Japanese companies, such as Nippon Oil Seal Industry Co. in 1960, leading to joint ventures in Asia. In 1990, it acquired the Swedish cleaning products company Wettex; in 1997 it formed a joint venture in Italy, later wholly owned, to recycle PET bottles into fabric. From the mid-1990s, it systematically developed markets and production facilities in Brazil, Russia, India, and China. It also continued to diversify, into shock absorption, filters, and starting with the acquisition in 1966 of Klüber Lubrication, chemical production.

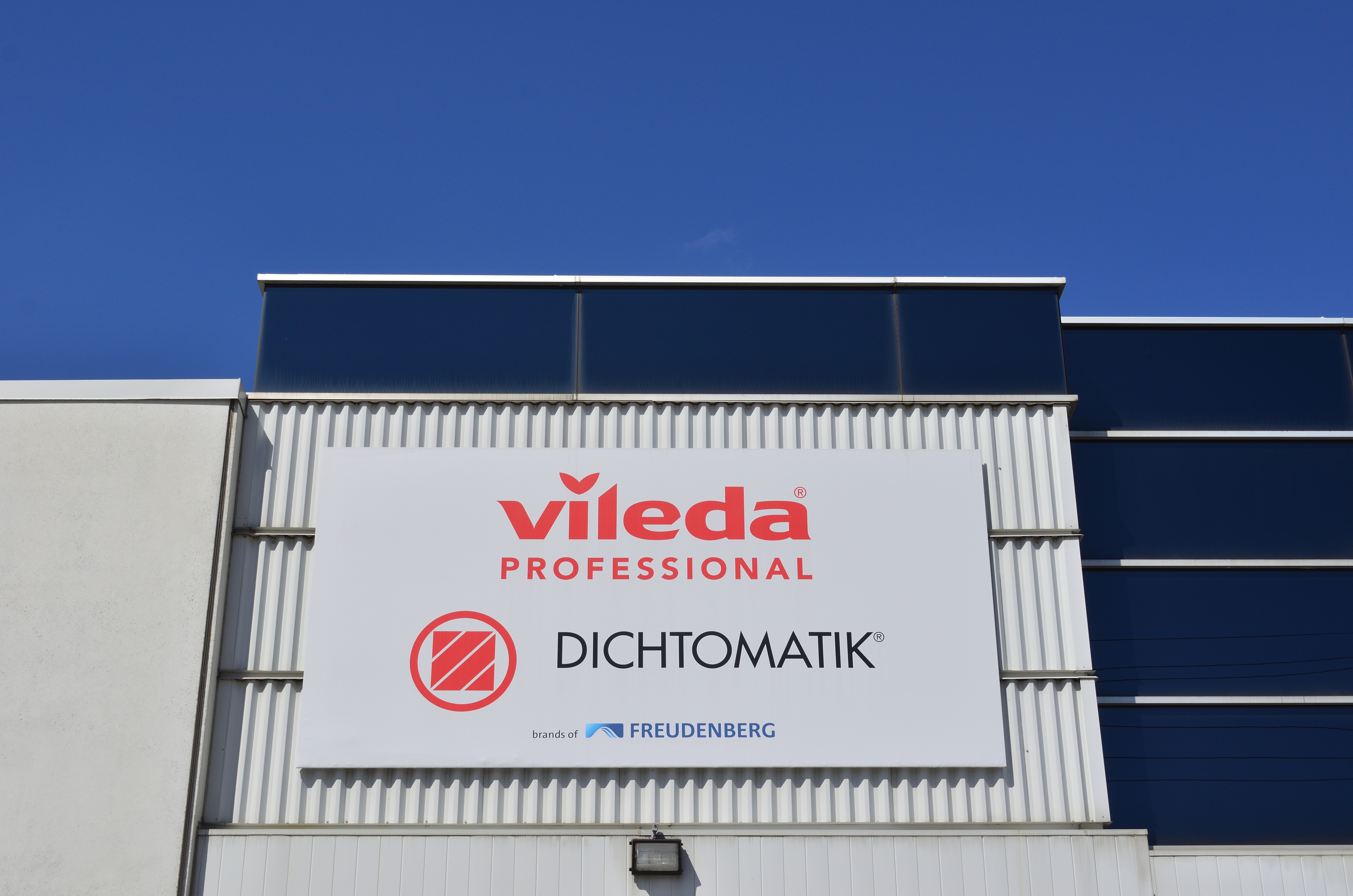
Vileda Professional, Markham, Ontario, Canada

Since a reorganisation in 1996, Freudenberg Group has had a decentralised structure; in 2013, it consisted of 16 divisions or areas of business incorporating 430 independent units. In 2004, Freudenberg Group made an initial entry into the global medical market with the creation of Freudenberg Medical EN.

The company's original business of leather production continued to shrink in the late 20th century, impacted by reduced demand and rising prices for raw materials. By 2001, the leather division was responsible for only 1% of Freudenberg's gross income and its primary customers were American companies, which cancelled orders after the September 11 attacks. In 2002 the company closed its last remaining tannery in Weinheim, marking the effective end of the leather industry in Germany. However, today Vileda is a market leader in Europe. All German cars contain parts made by another Freudenberg subsidiary, and German-made outdoor clothing contains fibres made by yet another. Almost all major airports have flooring made by another Freudenberg subsidiary.

As of 2005, three-quarters of Freudenberg's business was as a supplier to other companies. In 2004 Freudenberg had employees in 43 countries. By 2011, Freudenberg Group was a 5 billion euro business with more than 32,000 employees, approximately 11,000 in Germany. In 2023, it was an 11.9 billion euro business with more than 52,000 employees.

In 2015, the company sold its telecommunications business and began adding chemical and medical manufacturing products to its portfolio.

=== Chief executives ===
- Carl Johann Freudenberg (1849–1898) and Heinrich Christian Heintze (1849–1860); Leopold Heintze (1851-1874)
- Friedrich Carl Freudenberg (1898–1905) and Hermann Ernst Freudenberg (1898–1923)
- Richard Freudenberg (1923–1962)
- Hermann Freudenberg (1962–1988)
- Reinhart Freudenberg (1988–1997)
- Peter Bettermann (1997–2012; first non-family member to be Speaker of the Management Board)
- Mohsen Sohi (2012–2025)
- Claus Möhlenkamp (2025–present)

== Ownership and philosophy ==
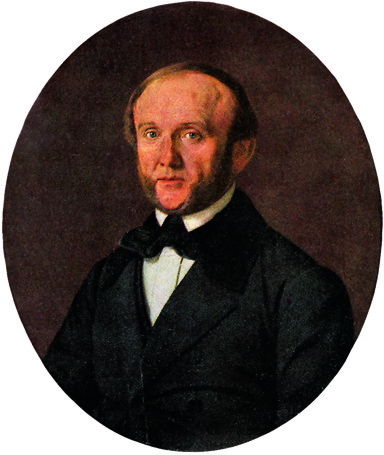
Carl Johann Freudenberg

Freudenberg remains a family-owned private company, structured as a Kommanditgesellschaft (limited partnership) jointly held by descendants of Carl Johann Freudenberg (some 300 in 2011). Stock cannot be sold to non-family members and must be surrendered by in-laws upon divorce. No stockholder holds more than 2% ownership. An annual three-day General Meeting elects the Board of Partners, which consists of 7 to 13 members of whom the majority must be Freudenberg family members. The divisions are managed by a Management Board, who need not be family members. Stockholders receive a semi-annual family newsletter and have access to an owners' intranet. A select few are on the Wine Commission, which oversees the private Freudenberg vineyards. These vineyards are the largest in the Bergstraße region, producing 60,000 bottles of wine annually. Wolfram Freudenberg, a fifth-generation family member who formerly headed the Stuttgart Stock Exchange, was Chairman of the Board of Partners from 2005 to 2014, succeeding Reinhart Freudenberg, who stepped down for reasons of age. In 2014 he was succeeded by Martin Wentzler, also a fifth-generation family member.

Carl Johann Freudenberg laid down guiding principles for the company: modesty, honor, financial solidity and adaptability to circumstances. In the late 1930s, the company developed operating principles that include broad diversification in both products and markets, spreading of risk, long-term thinking, the maintenance of an equity ratio of at least 40%, and avoidance of large acquisitions while favouring small ones. The company would rather acquire "a handful of interesting smaller enterprises" in a given year than a large company that might endanger the company philosophy. In each area of activity, the company operates only where it can be first or second in the market; for example, it sells motor seals worldwide but Vileda mops mostly in Europe.

== Divisions ==
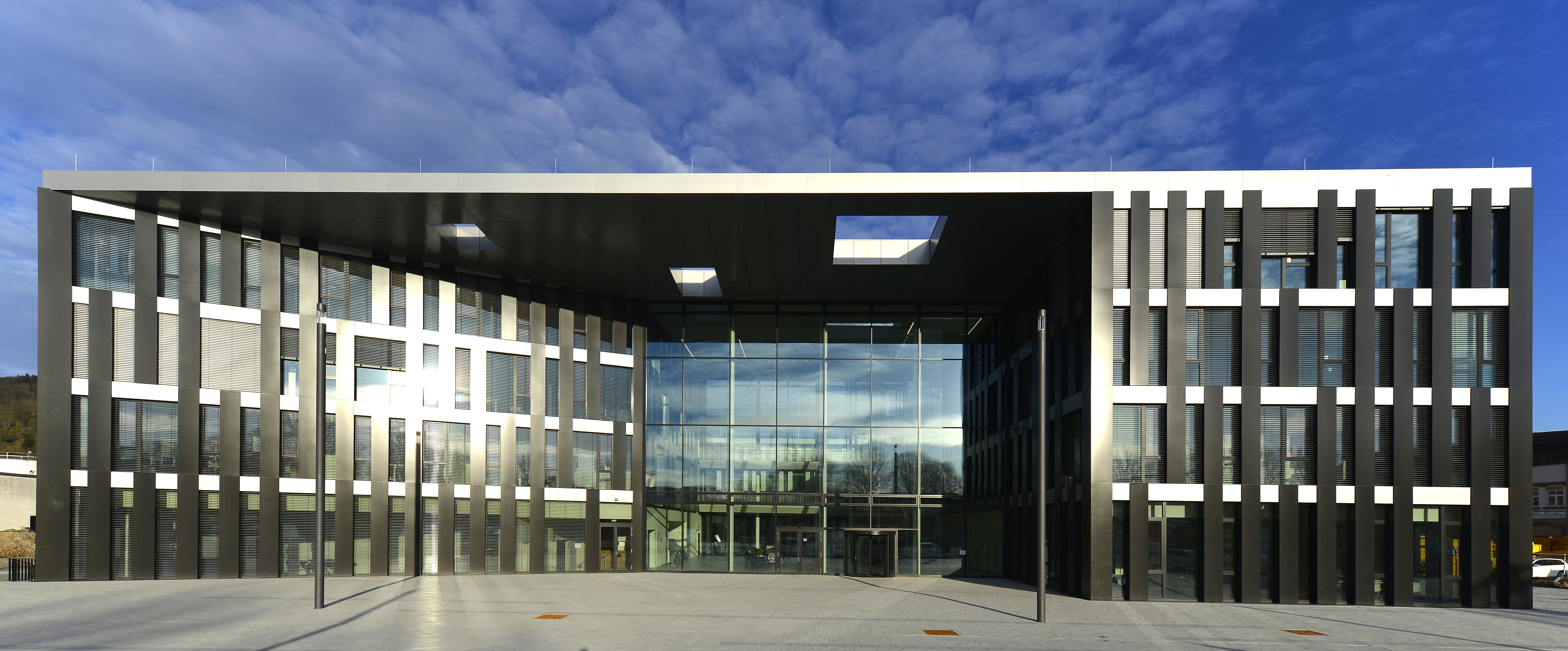
Headquarters of Freudenberg Sealing Technologies

As of 2024, the company consists of the following business groups (the majority headquartered in Weinheim):

- Freudenberg Chemical Specialities, headquartered in Munich (including the subsidiaries Capol, Chem-Trend, Klüber Lubrication, OKS, and SurTec)
- Freudenberg e-Power Systems, headquartered in Munich
- Freudenberg Filtration Technologies
- Freudenberg Flow Technologies, headquartered in Wolfratshausen (including TotalSealCare, Techlok, Bluelock, FlexBall, AlignLock, WellProtek, and EagleBurgmann, a partnership with the Japanese company Eagle Industries)
- Freudenberg Home and Cleaning Solutions (including Vileda, Vileda Professional, Gimi, Oates, Wettex, the American brand O-Cedar, acquired in 2003 the UK brand Marigold, acquired in 2013, and Gala brand products under a joint venture with the Indian company Gala Brush)
- Freudenberg Medical, headquartered in Beverly, Massachusetts, US
- Freudenberg Performance Materials
- Freudenberg Sealing Technologies (including Simmerings and Corteco, a brand of spare parts)
- Vibracoustic
- Japan Vilene Company, headquartered in Tokyo

== Philanthropy ==
Freudenberg instituted health insurance for employees in 1874.

The company owns the Schau- und Sichtungsgarten Hermannshof, a public botanical garden in Weinheim, which opened in 1983 and is jointly operated with the town.

The Freudenberg Stiftung (Foundation) was founded in 1984 and is endowed with stock in the parent company. It has a broad mandate "to promote science, the humanities and education as well as strengthening peaceful coexistence in society and culture" and focuses particularly on assistance to and democratic education of young people, primarily in Germany.
