= Constant-force spring =

Type of spring

Graphs of load vs extension of constant-force springs compared with ideal springs

An ideal constant-force spring is a spring for which the force it exerts over its range of motion is a constant, that is, it does not obey Hooke's law. In reality, "constant-force springs" do not provide a truly constant force and are constructed from materials that do obey Hooke's law. Generally, constant-force springs are constructed as a rolled ribbon of spring steel such that the spring is in a rolled-up form when relaxed.

== Mechanism ==
As the spring is unrolled, the material coming off the roll bends from the radius of the roll into a straight line between the reel and the load. Because the material tension-stiffness of the straight section is orders of magnitude greater than the bending stiffness of the ribbon, the straight section does not stretch significantly, the restoring force comes primarily from the deformation of the portion of the ribbon near the roll. Because the geometry of that region remains nearly constant as the spring unrolls (with material coming off the roll joining the curved section, and material in the curved section joining the straight section), the resulting force is nearly constant.

== See also ==
- Hydrospring
