= O-Cedar =

Brand of household products

- Parent: Freudenberg Household Products
- Website: ocedar.com

O-Cedar is a brand of mechanical and power cleaning products which are rebranded Vileda products. O-Cedar was acquired by the German company Freudenberg Household Products in 2003.

== History ==
The O-Cedar brand was first used in mid-1907 for a vegetable oil-based floor polish produced by the newly-formed Channell Chemical Company of Chicago. The first O-Cedar-branded dust mop would be introduced the following year. Channell would establish a UK subsidiary to market the O-Cedar brand there in 1913. The parent company would later be renamed O-Cedar Corp. in 1923.

O-Cedar Corp. was acquired by American-Marietta in March 1952, who after merging into Martin Marietta would sell the O-Cedar division to Drackett in May 1962. In 1965, Drackett was sold to Bristol-Myers, who would own the brand for nearly three decades before selling its consumer household products subsidiary to S. C. Johnson & Son in 1992. Due to anti-trust concerns, Johnson was compelled to sell the brand to Vining Industries in 1993, forming O-Cedar/Vining Household Products. Vining was acquired by the Freudenberg Group in 2003, with the products forming Freudenberg's Home and Cleaning Solutions division.
