= Hydrospring =

Mechanical device

A hydrospring or hydro-spring is a spring damped by hydraulic fluid (typically oil) being driven through holes in a piston, as the piston moves in response to a force.

The spring is often made of rubber. Inside a rubber hydrospring there are hydraulic viscous damping systems which damp movement in all three directions but require very few parts. Even the slack adjustment may be integrated into the element.

== Application ==
Hydrosprings are used mainly as shock absorbers in applications such as damped suspension in railway bogies, bulldozer blade shock absorbers and as recoil absorbers for artillery.

== Gallery ==
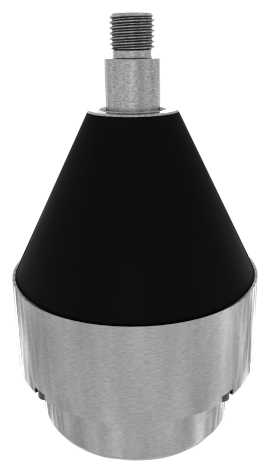
A railway type rubber hydrospring

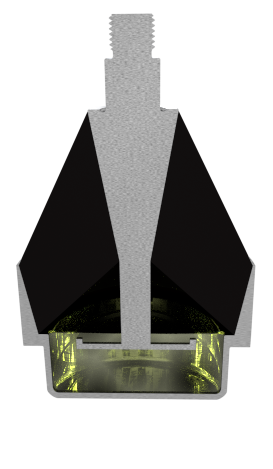
A railway type rubber hydrospring in relaxed state

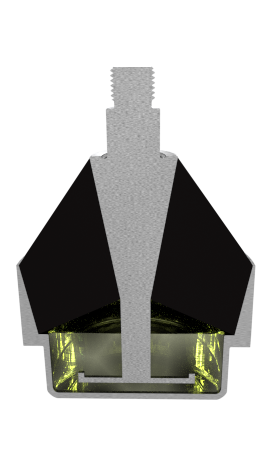
A railway type rubber hydrospring in compressed state

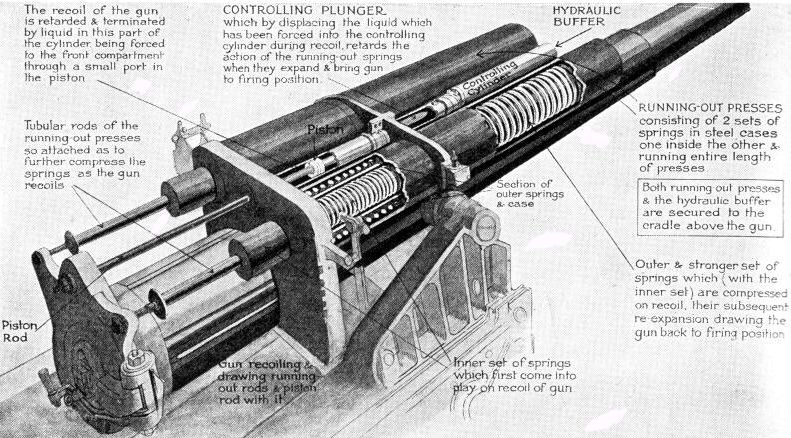
Hydro-spring recoil system of British WWI 60 pounder gun, with working explained

== See also ==
- Dashpot
- Garter spring
