= Marigold (rubber gloves) =

Brand name of a range of rubber gloves

Marigold, part of the Freudenberg Group, is the brand name of a range of rubber gloves it manufactures.
