= Spring (device) =

Elastic object that stores mechanical energy

Force (F) vs extension (s). Spring characteristics: (1) progressive, (2) linear, (3) degressive, (4) almost constant, (5) progressive with knee

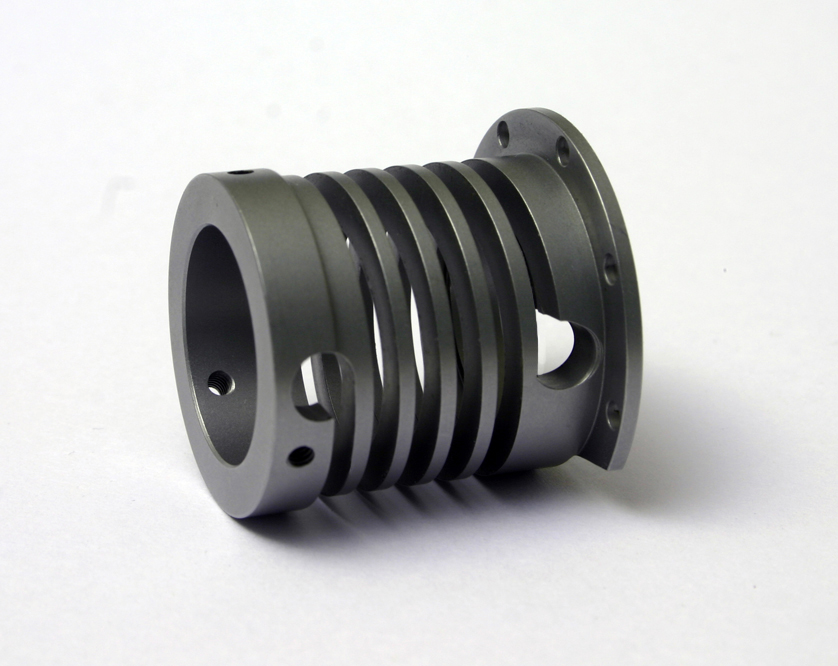
A machined spring incorporates several features into one piece of bar stock

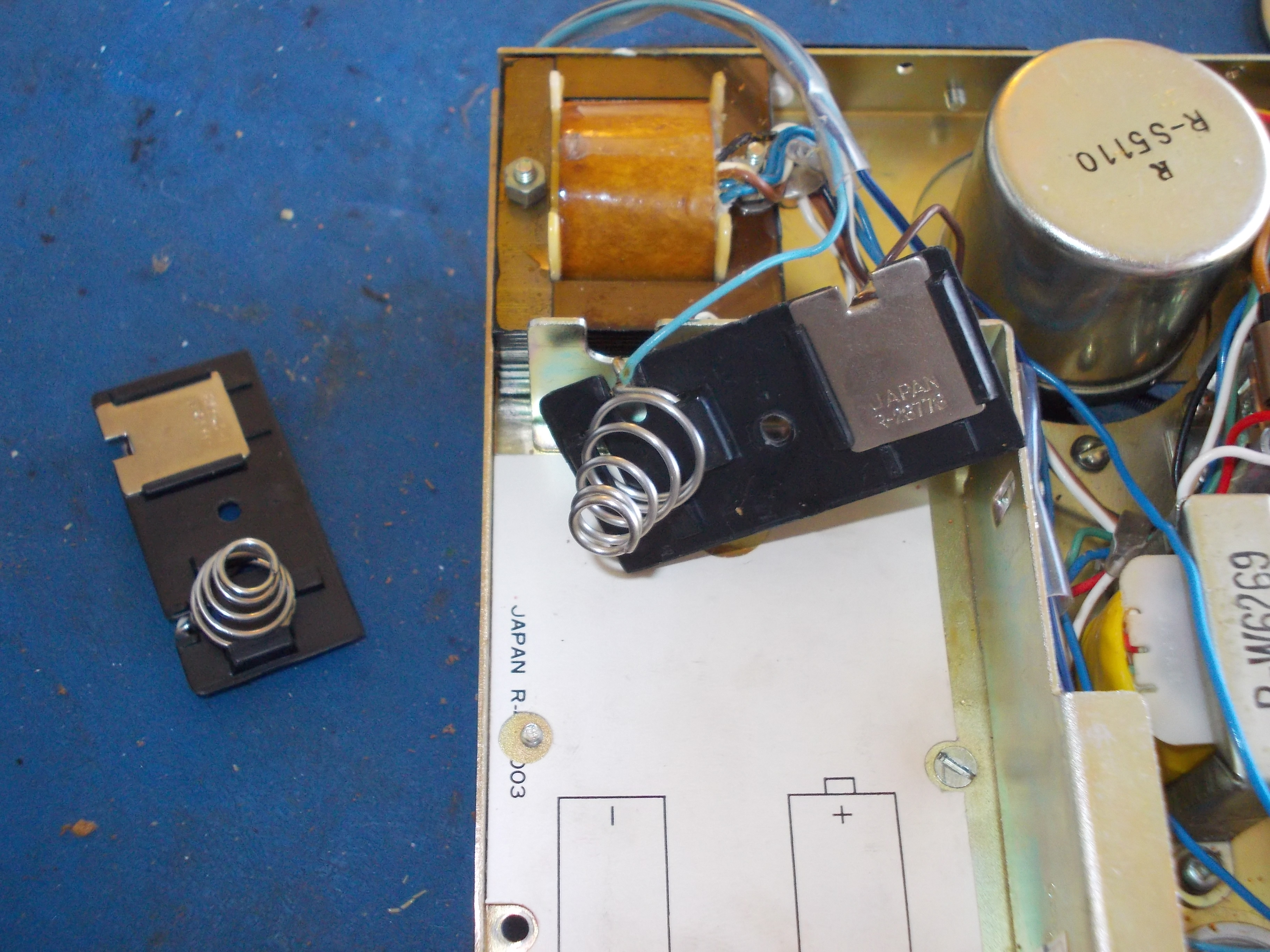
Battery contacts often have a variable spring

A spring is a device consisting of an elastic but largely rigid material (typically metal) bent or molded into a form (especially a coil) that can return into shape after being compressed, extended or twisted. Springs can store energy when compressed, when extended, and/or when twisted. In everyday use, the term most often refers to coil springs, but there are many different spring designs. Modern springs are typically manufactured from spring steel. An example of a non-metallic spring is the bow, made traditionally of flexible yew wood, which when drawn stores energy to propel an arrow.

When a conventional spring, without stiffness variability features, is compressed or stretched from its resting position, it exerts an opposing force approximately proportional to its change in length (this approximation breaks down for larger deflections). The rate or spring constant of a spring is the change in the force it exerts, divided by the change in deflection of the spring. That is, it is the gradient of the force versus deflection curve. An extension or compression spring's rate is expressed in units of force divided by distance, for example or N/m or lbf/in. A torsion spring is a spring that works by twisting; when it is twisted about its axis by an angle, it produces a torque proportional to the angle. A torsion spring's rate is in units of torque divided by angle, such as N·m/rad or ft·lbf/degree. The inverse of spring rate is compliance, that is: if a spring has a rate of 10 N/mm, it has a compliance of 0.1 mm/N. The stiffness (or rate) of springs in parallel is additive, as is the compliance of springs in series.

Springs are made from a variety of elastic materials, the most common being spring steel. Small springs can be wound from pre-hardened stock, while larger ones are made from annealed steel and hardened after manufacture. Some non-ferrous metals are also used, including phosphor bronze and titanium for parts requiring corrosion resistance, and low-resistance beryllium copper for springs carrying electric current.

== History ==
Simple non-coiled springs have been used throughout human history, e.g. the bow (and arrow). In the Bronze Age more sophisticated spring devices were used, as shown by the spread of tweezers in many cultures. Ctesibius of Alexandria developed a method for making springs out of an alloy of bronze with an increased proportion of tin, hardened by hammering after it was cast.

Coiled springs appeared early in the 15th century, in door locks. The first spring-powered clocks appeared in that century and evolved into the first large watches by the 16th century.

In 1676 British physicist Robert Hooke postulated Hooke's law, which states that the force a spring exerts is proportional to its extension.

On March 8, 1850, John Evans, Founder of John Evans' Sons, Incorporated, opened his business in New Haven, Connecticut, manufacturing flat springs for carriages and other vehicles, as well as the machinery to manufacture the springs. Evans was a Welsh blacksmith and springmaker who emigrated to the United States in 1847, John Evans' Sons became "America's oldest springmaker" and continues to operate today.

== Types ==
=== Classification ===
Different ways to apply a load force.

Springs can be classified depending on how the load force is applied to them.

Tension/extension spring
The spring is designed to operate with a tension load, so the spring stretches as the load is applied to it.

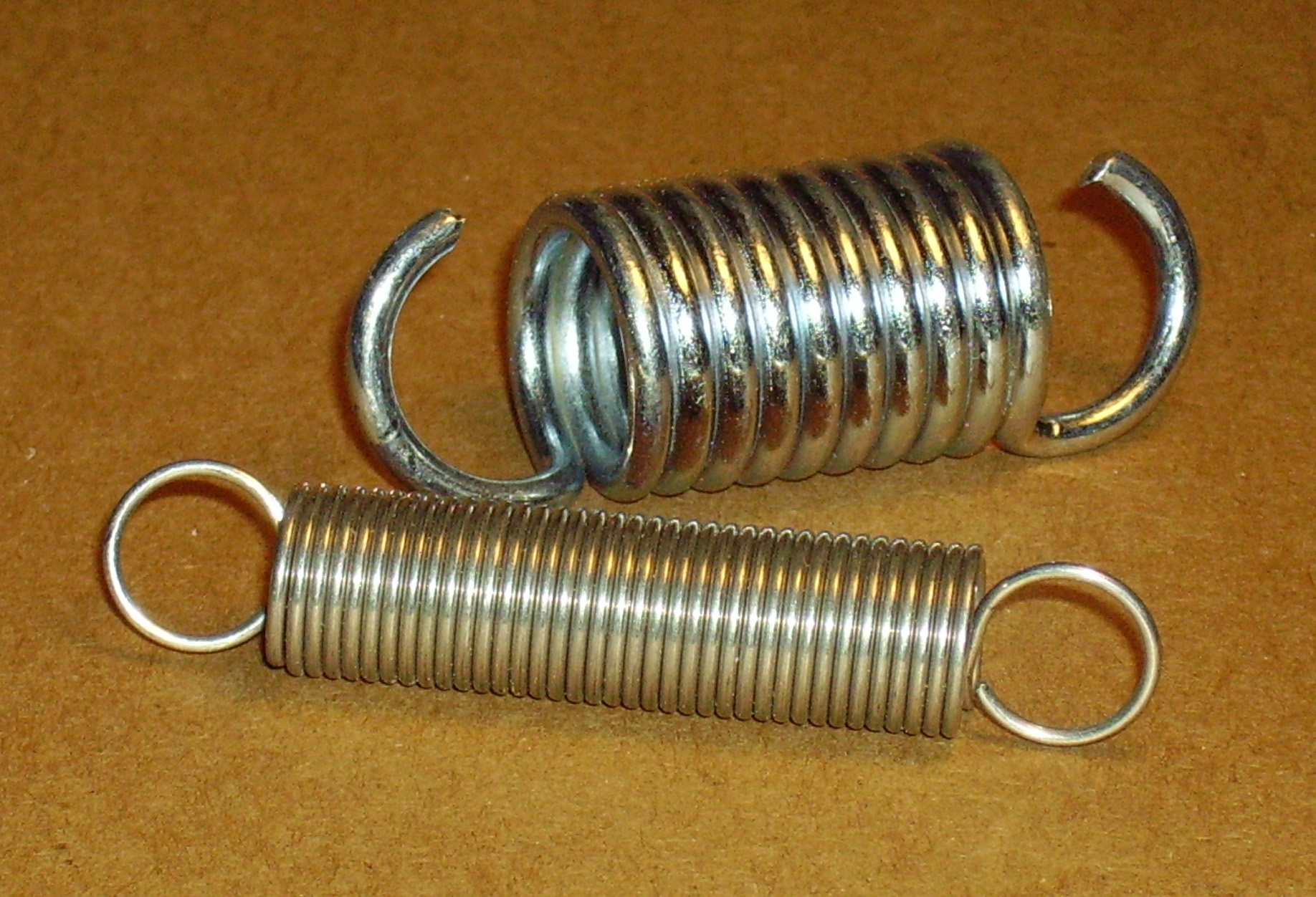
Helical coil springs designed for tension.

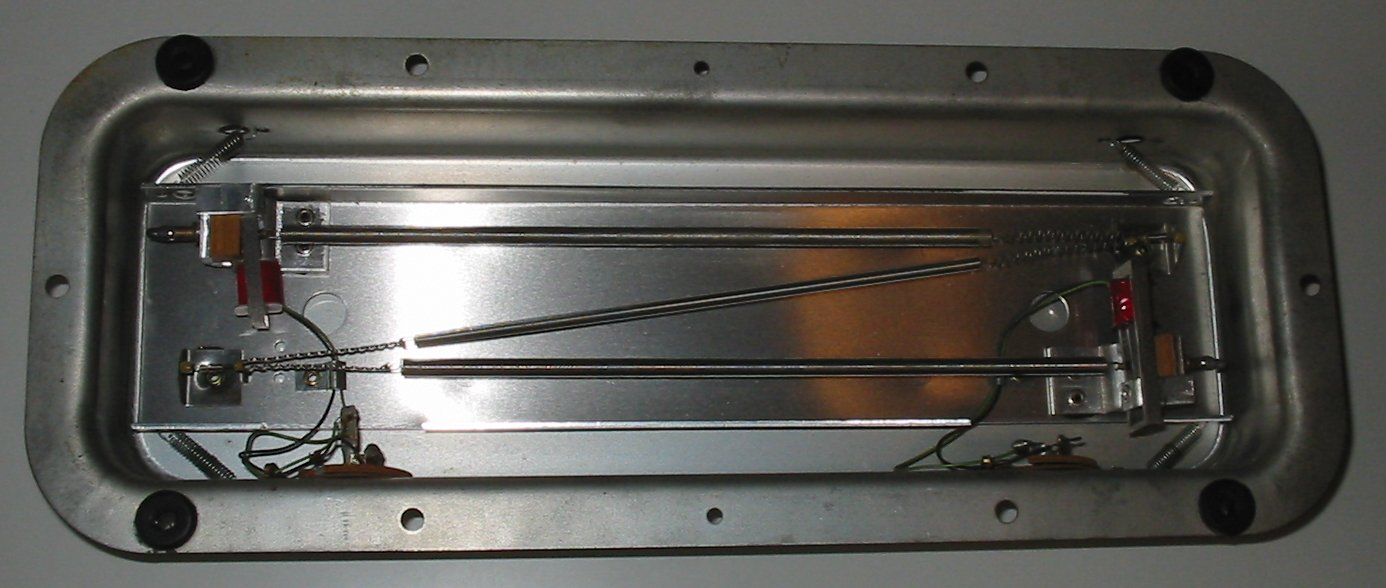
Tension springs in a folded line reverberation device.

Compression spring
Designed to operate with a compression load, so the spring gets shorter as the load is applied to it.
Torsion spring
Unlike the above types in which the load is an axial force, the load applied to a torsion spring is a torque or twisting force, and the end of the spring rotates through an angle as the load is applied. Often used in torsion bar vehicle suspension systems.

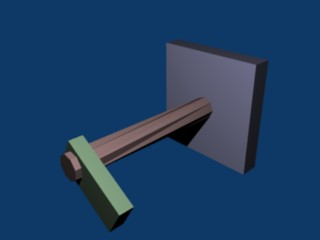
A torsion bar twisted under load

There are many other ways to potentially classify and subclassify springs, such as their shape - coil springs are common, but so are leaf springs, for example. Garter springs are arc springs with a specific arc in mind; both are typically made by bending a coil spring into a position.

=== Common types ===
The most common types of spring are:

Balance spring
Also known as a hairspring. A delicate spiral spring used in watches, galvanometers, and places where electricity must be carried to partially rotating devices such as steering wheels without hindering the rotation.
Cantilever spring
A flat spring fixed only at one end like a cantilever, while the free-hanging end takes the load.
Coil spring
Also known as a helical spring. A spring (made by winding a wire around a cylinder) is of two types.
- Tension or extension springs are designed to become longer under load. Their turns (loops) are normally touching in the unloaded position, and they have a hook, eye or some other means of attachment at each end.
- Compression springs are designed to become shorter when loaded. Their turns (loops) are not touching in the unloaded position, and they need no attachment points.

Arc spring
A pre-curved or arc-shaped helical (coiled) compression spring, which transmits a torque around an axis.

Garter spring
An arc spring where the arc is a full circle. They can be compression or extension springs.

Volute spring

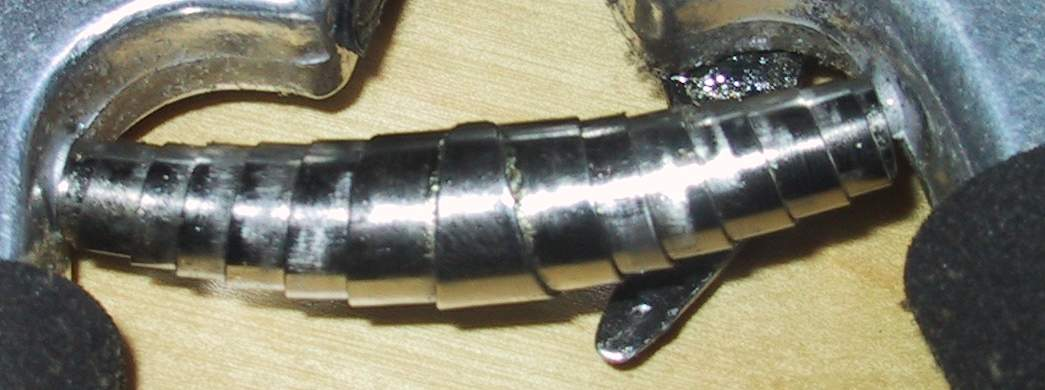
A volute spring. Under compression the coils slide over each other to afford longer travel.

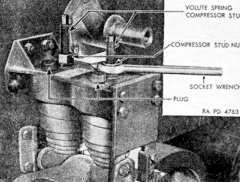
Vertical volute springs of a Stuart tank

A coil spring in the form of a cone so that under compression the coils are not forced against each other, thus permitting longer travel.

Hollow tubing spring
Can be either extension springs or compression springs. Hollow tubing is filled with oil and the means of changing hydrostatic pressure inside the tubing such as a membrane or miniature piston etc. to harden or relax the spring, much like it happens with water pressure inside a garden hose. Alternatively tubing's cross-section is chosen of a shape that it changes its area when tubing is subjected to torsional deformation: change of the cross-section area translates into change of tubing's inside volume and the flow of oil in/out of the spring that can be controlled by valve thereby controlling stiffness. There are many other designs of springs of hollow tubing that can change stiffness with any desired frequency, change stiffness by a multiple, or move like a linear actuator, in addition to its spring qualities.
Leaf spring
A flat spring used in vehicle suspensions, electrical switches, and bows.
V-spring
Also known as chevron spring. Used in antique firearm mechanisms such as the wheellock, flintlock and percussion cap locks. Also used as a door-lock spring, such as in antique door latch mechanisms.

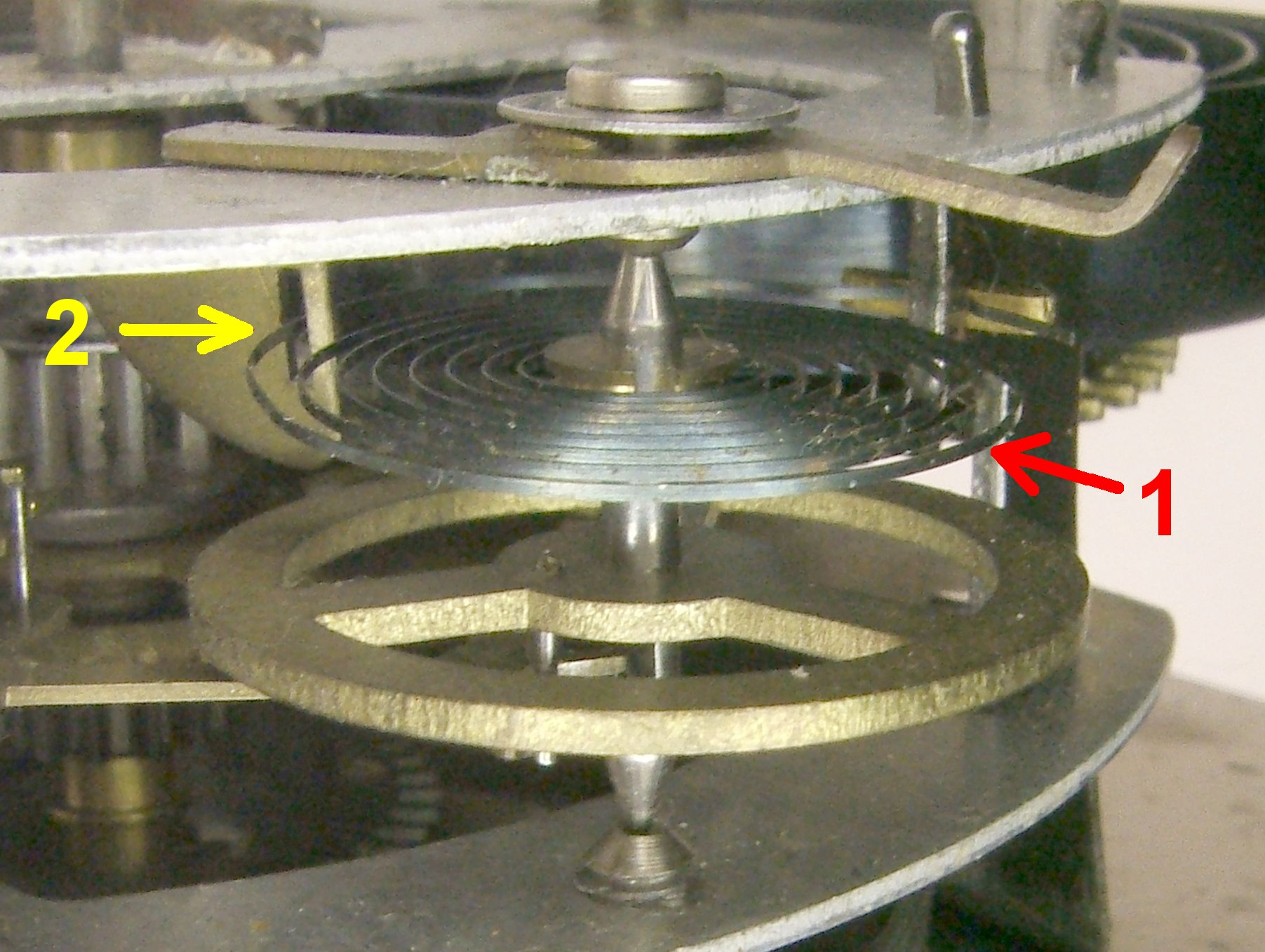
A spiral torsion spring, or hairspring, in an alarm clock.

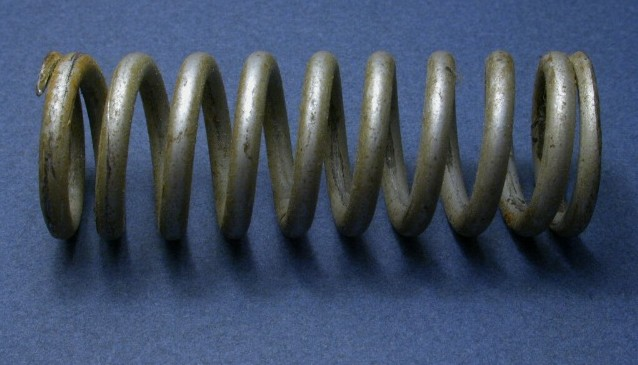
A heavy-duty coil spring designed for compression

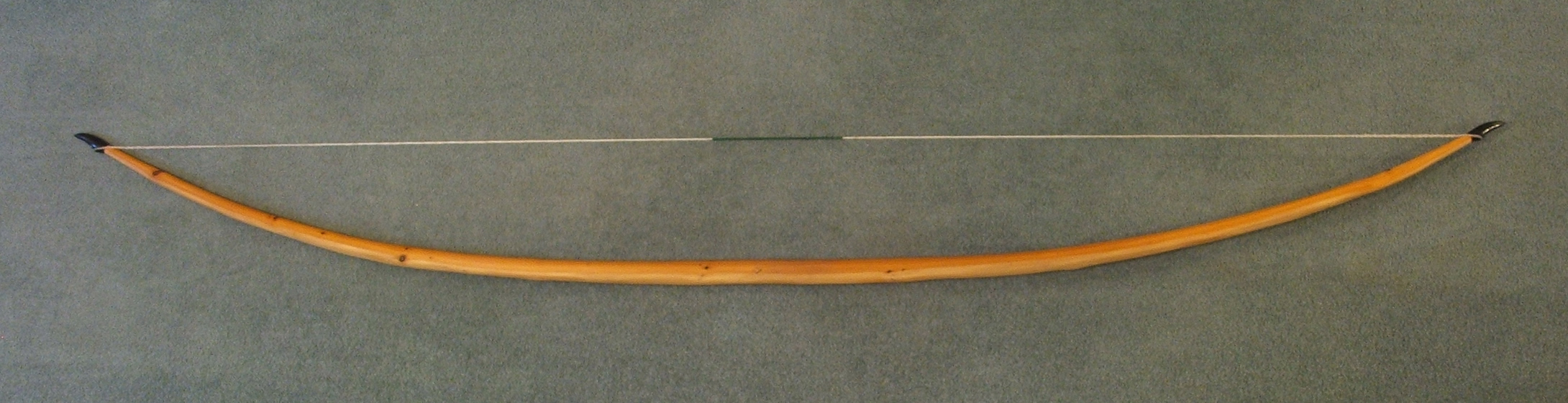
The English longbow – a simple but powerful spring made of yew, measuring 2 m (6 ft 7 in) long, with a 470 N (105 lbf) draw weight, with each limb functionally a cantilever spring and the entire bow acting as an extension arc spring.

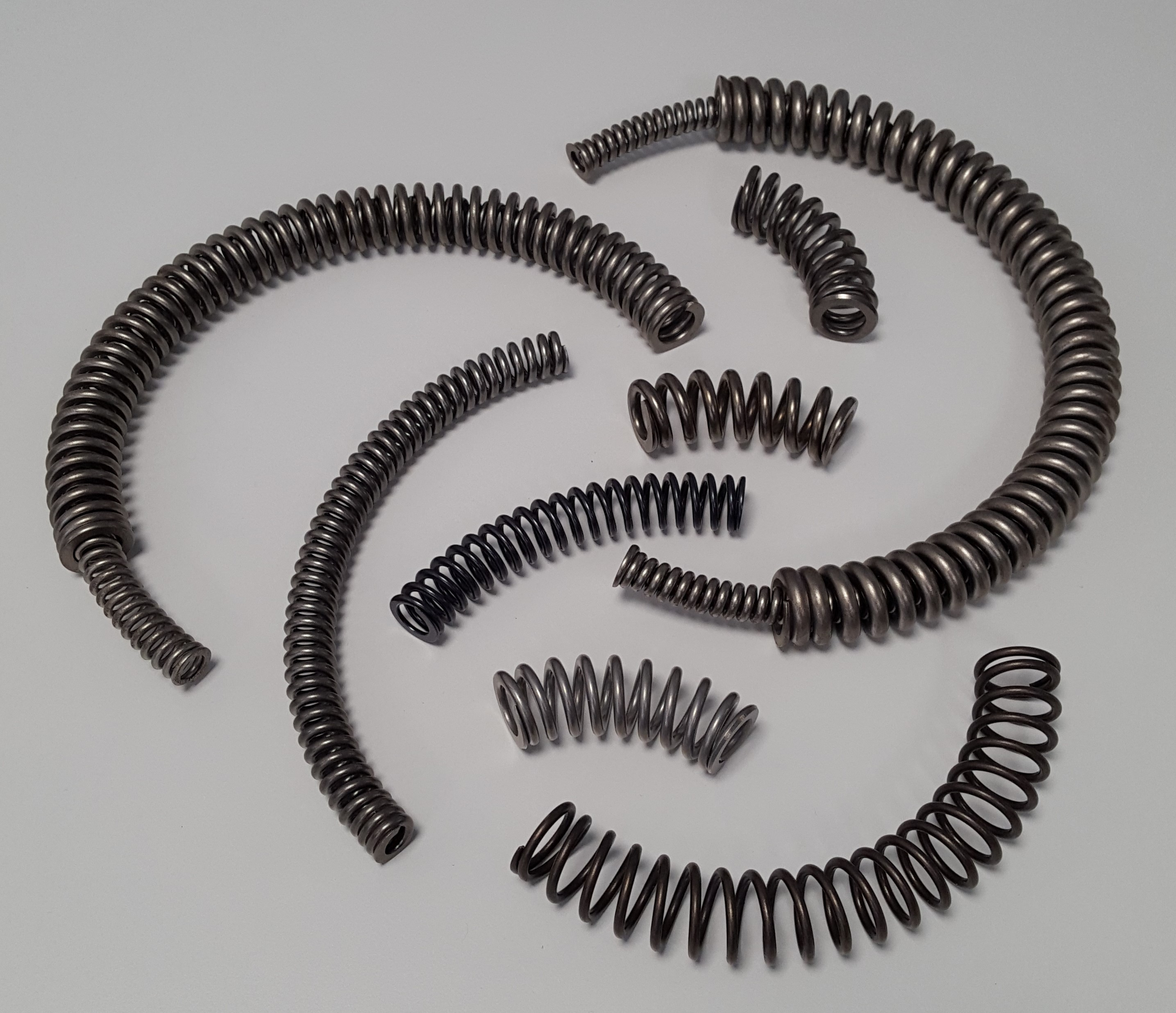
Selection of various arc springs and arc spring systems (systems consisting of inner and outer arc springs).

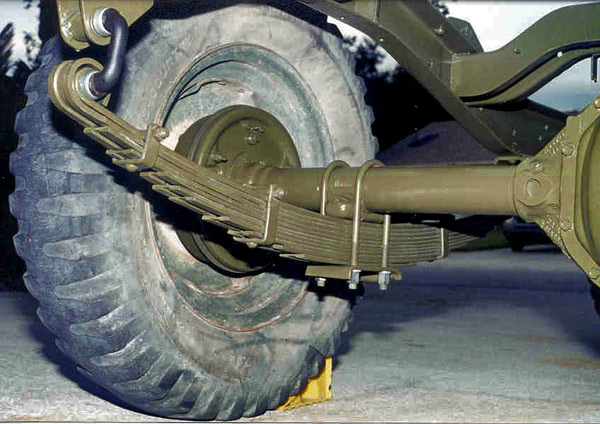
Leaf spring on a truck

=== Other types ===
Other types include:

Belleville washer
A disc shaped spring commonly used to apply tension to a bolt (and also in the initiation mechanism of pressure-activated landmines)
Constant-force spring
A tightly rolled ribbon that exerts a nearly constant force as it is unrolled
Gas spring
A volume of compressed gas.
Ideal spring
An idealised perfect spring with no weight, mass, damping losses, or limits, a concept used in physics. The force an ideal spring would exert is exactly proportional to its extension or compression.
Mainspring
A spiral ribbon-shaped spring used as a power store of clockwork mechanisms: watches, clocks, music boxes, windup toys, and mechanically powered flashlights
Negator spring
A thin metal band slightly concave in cross-section. When coiled it adopts a flat cross-section but when unrolled it returns to its former curve, thus producing a constant force throughout the displacement and negating any tendency to re-wind. The most common application is the retracting steel tape rule.
Progressive rate coil springs
A coil spring with a variable rate, usually achieved by having unequal distance between turns so that as the spring is compressed one or more coils rests against its neighbour.
Rubber band
A tension spring where energy is stored by stretching the material.
Spring washer
Used to apply a constant tensile force along the axis of a fastener.
Wave spring
various types of spring made compact by using waves to give a spring effect.

== Physics ==
=== Hooke's law ===
An ideal spring acts in accordance with Hooke's law, which states that the force with which the spring pushes back is proportional to the distance from its equilibrium length:
$$F=-kx$$
where

x is the displacement vector – the distance from its equilibrium length.
F is the resulting force vector – the magnitude and direction of the restoring force the spring exerts
k is the rate, spring constant or force constant of the spring, a constant that depends on the spring's material and construction. The negative sign indicates that the force the spring exerts is in the opposite direction from its displacement

Most real springs approximately follow Hooke's law if not stretched or compressed beyond their elastic limit.

Coil springs and other common springs typically obey Hooke's law. There are useful springs that don't: springs based on beam bending can, for example, produce forces that vary nonlinearly with displacement.

If made with constant pitch (wire thickness), conical springs have a variable rate. However, a conical spring can be made to have a constant rate by creating the spring with a variable pitch. A larger pitch in the larger-diameter coils and a smaller pitch in the smaller-diameter coils forces the spring to collapse or extend all the coils at the same rate when deformed.

=== Simple harmonic motion ===
Since force is equal to mass, m, times acceleration, a, the force equation for a spring obeying 's law looks like:

$$F = m a \quad \Rightarrow \quad -k x = m a. \,$$

The displacement, x, as a function of time. The amount of time that passes between peaks is called the period.

The mass of the spring is small in comparison to the mass of the attached mass and is ignored. Since acceleration is simply the second derivative of x with respect to time,

$$- k x = m \frac{d^2 x}{dt^2}. \,$$

This is a second order linear differential equation for the displacement $x$ as a function of time. Rearranging:

$$\frac{d^2 x}{dt^2} + \frac{k}{m} x = 0, \,$$

the solution of which is the sum of a sine and cosine:

$$x(t) = A \sin \left(t \sqrt{\frac{k}{m}} \right) + B \cos \left(t \sqrt{\frac{k}{m}} \right). \,$$

$A$ and $B$ are arbitrary constants that may be found by considering the initial displacement and velocity of the mass. The graph of this function with $B = 0$ (zero initial position with some positive initial velocity) is displayed in the image on the right.

=== Energy dynamics ===
In simple harmonic motion of a spring-mass system, energy fluctuates between kinetic energy and potential energy, but the total energy of the system remains the same. A spring that obeys Hooke's law with spring constant k has a total system energy E of:
$$E = \left (\frac{1}{2} \right )kA^2$$
Here, A is the amplitude of the wave-like motion that is produced by the oscillating behavior of the spring.

The potential energy U of such a system can be determined through the spring constant k and its displacement x:
$$U = \left (\frac{1}{2} \right )kx^2$$
The kinetic energy K of an object in simple harmonic motion can be found using the mass of the attached object m and the velocity at which the object oscillates v:
$$K = \left (\frac{1}{2} \right )mv^2$$
Since there is no energy loss in such a system, energy is always conserved and thus:
$$E = K + U$$

=== Frequency & period ===
The angular frequency ω of an object in simple harmonic motion, given in radians per second, is found using the spring constant k and the mass of the oscillating object m:

$$\omega=\sqrt{\frac{k}{m}}$$

The period T, the amount of time for the spring-mass system to complete one full cycle, of such harmonic motion is given by:

$$T = \frac{2\pi}{\omega}=2\pi\sqrt{\frac{m}{k}}$$

The frequency f, the number of oscillations per unit time, of something in simple harmonic motion is found by taking the inverse of the period:

$$f = \frac{1}{T} = \frac{\omega}{2\pi} = \frac{\sqrt{k}}{2\pi\sqrt{m}}$$

== Theory ==
In classical physics, a spring can be seen as a device that stores potential energy, specifically elastic potential energy, by straining the bonds between the atoms of an elastic material.

Hooke's law of elasticity states that the extension of an elastic rod (its distended length minus its relaxed length) is proportional to its tension, the force used to stretch it. Similarly, the contraction (negative extension) is proportional to the compression (negative tension).

This law actually holds only approximately, and only when the deformation (extension or contraction) is small compared to the rod's overall length. For deformations beyond the elastic limit, atomic bonds get broken or rearranged, and a spring may snap, buckle, or permanently deform. Many materials have no clearly defined elastic limit, and Hooke's law can not be meaningfully applied to these materials. Moreover, for the superelastic materials, the linear relationship between force and displacement is appropriate only in the low-strain region.

Hooke's law is a mathematical consequence of the fact that the potential energy of the rod is a minimum when it has its relaxed length. Any smooth function of one variable approximates a quadratic function when examined near enough to its minimum point as can be seen by examining the Taylor series. Therefore, the force, which is the derivative of energy with respect to displacement, approximates a linear function.

The force of a fully compressed compression coil spring is:

$$F_{max} = \frac{E d^4 (L-n d)}{16 (1+\nu) (D-d)^3 n} \$$

where

E is Young's modulus
d is the spring wire diameter
L is the free length of the spring
n is the number of active windings
ν is Poisson's ratio
D is the spring outer diameter

== Zero-length springs ==
Simplified LaCoste suspension using a zero-length spring

Spring length L vs force F graph of ordinary (+), zero-length (0) and negative-length (−) springs with the same minimum length L_{0} and spring constant

Zero-length spring is a term for a specially designed coil spring that would exert zero force if it had zero length. That is, in a line graph of the spring's force versus its length, the line passes through the origin. A real coil spring cannot contract to zero length because at some point the coils touch each other. "Length" here is defined as the distance between the axes of the pivots at each end of the spring, regardless of any inelastic portion in-between.

Zero-length springs are made by manufacturing a coil spring with built-in tension (a twist is introduced into the wire as it is coiled during manufacture; this works because a coiled spring unwinds as it stretches), so if it could contract further, the equilibrium point of the spring, the point at which its restoring force is zero, occurs at a length of zero. In practice, the manufacture of springs is typically not accurate enough to produce springs with tension consistent enough for applications that use zero length springs, so they are made by combining a negative length spring, made with even more tension so its equilibrium point would be at a negative length, with a piece of inelastic material of the proper length so the zero force point would occur at zero length.

A zero-length spring can be attached to a mass on a hinged boom in such a way that the force on the mass is almost exactly balanced by the vertical component of the force from the spring, whatever the position of the boom. This creates a horizontal pendulum with a long oscillation period. Long-period pendulums enable seismometers to sense the slowest waves from earthquakes. The LaCoste suspension with zero-length springs is also used in gravimeters because it is sensitive to changes in gravity. Springs for closing doors are often made to have roughly zero length, so that they exert force even when the door is almost closed, so they can hold it closed firmly.

== Uses ==
- Airsoft gun
- Aerospace
- Retractable ballpoint pens
- Buckling spring keyboards
- Clockwork clocks, watches, and other things
- Firearms
- Forward or aft spring, a method of mooring a vessel to a shore fixture
- Gravimeters
- Industrial Equipment
- Jewelry: Clasp mechanisms
- Most folding knives, and switchblades
- Lock mechanisms: Key-recognition and for coordinating the movements of various parts of the lock.
- Spring mattresses
- Medical Devices
- Pogo Stick
- Pop-open devices: CD players, tape recorders, toasters, etc.
- Spring reverb
- Toys; the Slinky toy is just a spring
- Trampoline
- Upholstery coil springs
- Vehicle suspension, Leaf springs

== See also ==
- Shock absorber
- Slinky, helical spring toy
