= NOK Corporation =

Japanese group of companies

- Logo since April 2024
- Native name: NOK株式会社
- Romanized name: NOK kabushiki gaisha
- Formerly: Japan Bearing Production Co., Ltd. (1941–1942); Nippon Yushi Industry Co., Ltd. (1942–1948); Tokyo Oil Seal Industry Co., Ltd. (1948–1951); Nippon Oil Seal Industry Co., Ltd. (1951–1985)
- Company type: Public
- Traded as: TYO: 7240
- Founded: 18 November 1939; 86 years ago (as Edogawa Seiki Co., Ltd. 江戸川精機株式会社)
- Founder: Seigo Tsuru
- Headquarters: Shibadaimon, Minato, Tokyo, Japan
- Area served: Worldwide
- Key people: Masao Tsuru (CEO)
- Products: Oil seals, mechanical seals and electronic components
- Revenue: ▲¥750.502 billion(2024).
- Operating income: ▲¥22.912 billion
- Net income: ▲¥31.602 billion
- Total assets: ▲¥952.379 billion
- Total equity: ▲¥639.001 billion
- Owner: Freudenberg Group (25.11%); Japan Trustee Services Bank (5.42%)
- Number of employees: 37,913 (2023)
- Website: www.nok.co.jp/en/

NOK Corporation (NOK株式会社, NOK kabushiki gaisha), commonly referred to as NOK, is a Japanese manufacturing company specializing in the production of sealing products, functional parts, and electronic components. Founded in 1939 and headquartered in Minato, Tokyo, Japan.

NOK is an independent automotive parts supplier, boasts a domestic market share of 70% and has business relationships with all major Japan's complete vehicle manufacturers.

== History ==
NOK was initially founded as Nippon Oil Seal Industry Co., Ltd. in 1939. The company began by manufacturing oil seals and various rubber products, gradually expanding its product range and technological capabilities.

- In Mar. 1960, a captical participation agreement is concluded with Freudenberg Group in Germany.
- In Oct. 1961, Nippon Oil Seal Industry Co., Ltd. (former name of NOK) is listed on the Tokyo Stock Exchange.
- In Oct. 1964, first subsidiary Nippon Sealol Co., Ltd was founded. This subsidiary is currently known as Eagle Industries.
- In Jan. 1966, the head office was moved to Minato-ku, Tokyo.
- In Mar. 1968, NOK-USA Inc., was founded in the USA.
- In Nov. 1969, Subsidiary Nippon Mektron was founded.
- In Jan. 1982, Eagle Industries was listed on the Tokyo Stock Exchange.
- In Jul. 1985, The company name is changed to NOK Corporation.

== Products ==
NOK's business is conducted by three main companies(主要三社): NOK, Eagle Industries(EKK) and Nippon Mektron(MEK). NOK primarily develops and manufactures oil seals and manages R&D of the group. EKK handles the mechanical seal business, expanding into industrial and aviation field. The electronical components business is conducted by MEK. Overseas sales account for about 60% of the company's total sales, with seal production bases in Vietnam and Thailand, and FPC production bases in China

=== Sealing products ===
NOK is the first Japanese seals manufacturer, has extensive range of sealing products including oil seals, packings, O-ring, soft metals, seal washers and mechanical seals. Seals are used to prevent the leakage of fluids and gases in automotive engines. As a major product line, sealing products account for half of the group's sales.

=== Electronic components ===
NOK ranks third in the world in the FPC(Flexible Printed Circuit) market share, providing FPC products for major smartphone manufacturers, including Apple. NOK also invests heavily in electric vehicle (EV) related technologies. In 2023, NOK allocated 70 billion yen to expand FPC manufacturing specifically for use in EV batteries.

== Corporate affairs ==
NOK is headquartered in Minato, Tokyo. NOK has domestic factories in Fujisawa, Fukushima, Kita-ibaraki, Tsukuba, Shizuoka, Kikugawa, Tottori and Kumamoto. R&D Centre of the group located at Fujisawa, Kanagawa. NOK owns 51 overseas group companies in US, India, Indonesia, Hong Kong, South Korea, Singapore, Taiwan, Thailand, China, Philippines, Vietnam, Malaysia, Czech Republic, Germany, Hungary and France.

In April 2024, NOK published its new CI designed by Kashiwa Sato.

== Related companies ==
- Freudenberg Group: strategic partnership
- Eagle Industries: wholly owned subsidiary of mechanical seal manufacturing
- Nippon Mektron: wholly owned subsidiary of Electronic Component manufacturing
