= Vileda =

Cleaning product company

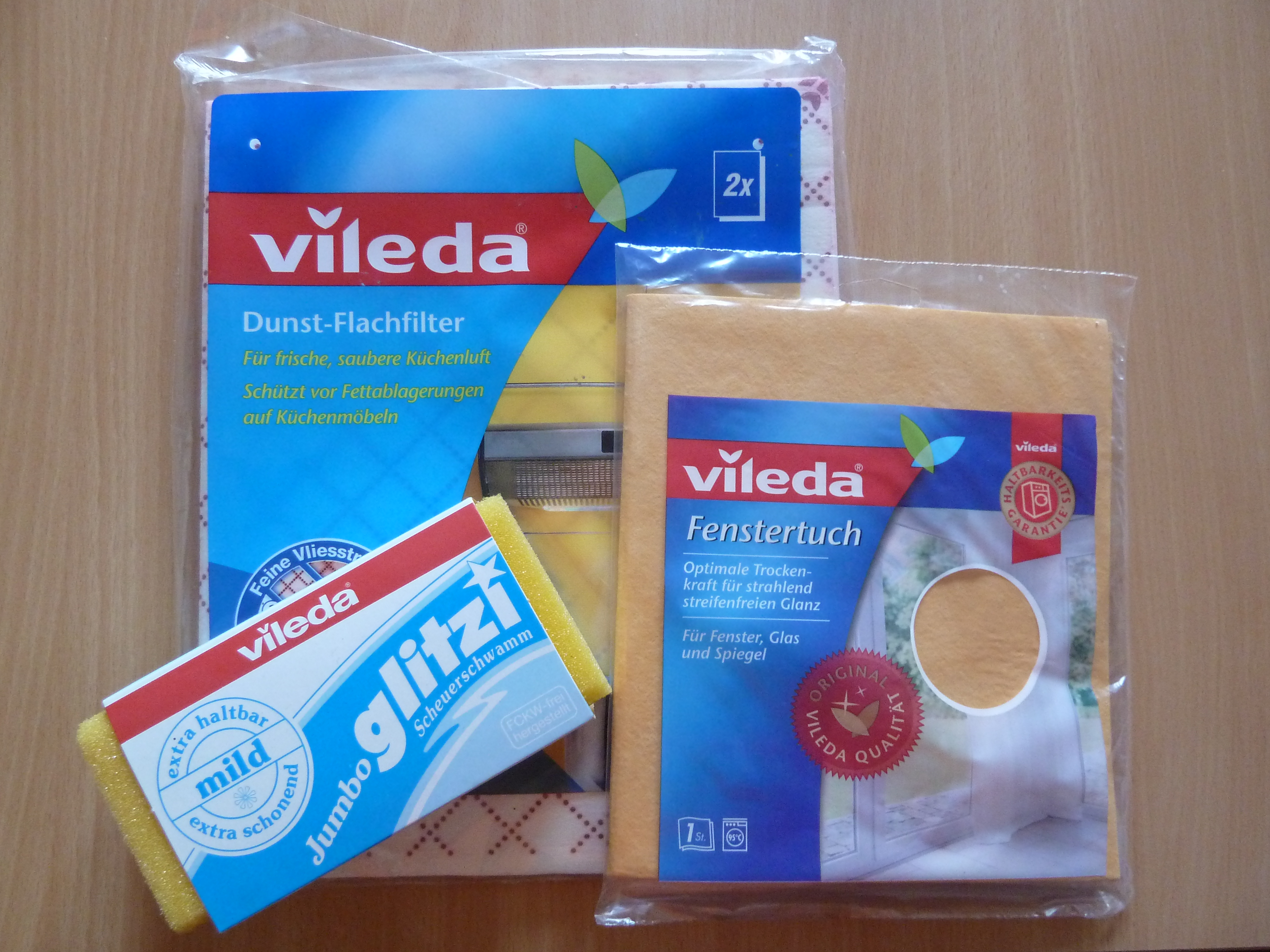
Products sold by Vileda

Vileda is a brand of mechanical and power cleaning products, owned by the Freudenberg Group.

The name derives from the German wie leder, which means like leather. An early product was the Vileda Window Cloth, launched in 1948. Vileda GmbH was established in 1962.

Vileda is distributed across Europe, Oceania, Asia, South America, and Canada. In the United States it is branded as O-Cedar. Other brand names include Wettex, Gala, Marigold, SWASH and Gimi. Vileda Professional offers commercial products.

== Products ==
The Vileda Bee Mop was introduced to the Canadian marketplace in 1976. The first model used metal for most of its moving parts. Journalist Leslie Scrivener wrote in 2013 that an original Bee Mop lasted “longer than many marriages” and remarked that she would gladly add a verse to it in the country and western song ‘’Stuff that Works’’ by Guy Clark. She writes that the curious name of the products refers to the “sponge, brown, firm yet porous,” which “has the appearance of a honey comb.” A salesman said to Scrivener that the Bee works well on wood floors, and estimated that some 15 million have been sold over the 40 years since its introduction.

Scrivener was less impressed by the new plastic model which, although lighter, was not as sturdy as the original.

The Vileda Spin Mop and Bucket Floor Cleaning System is on the Canadian marketplace since at least 2022, for domestic use. There are some complaints that the bucket is too large for storage in small apartments. It was given a 4.7/5.0 star rating after 12,000 reviews.
