= Cable reel =

Round object used to carry electrical wires

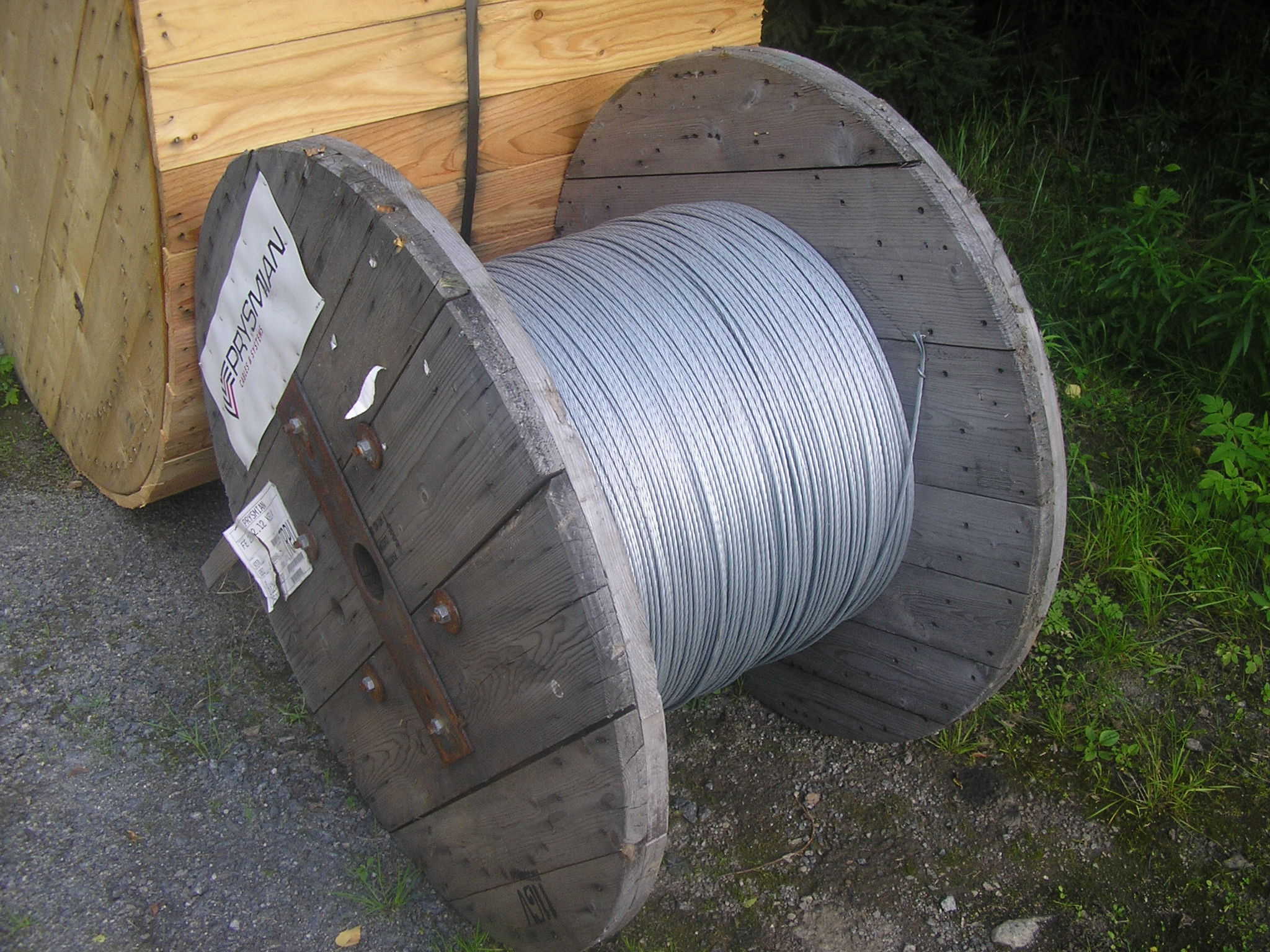
Steel wire reel in Muurame, Central Finland

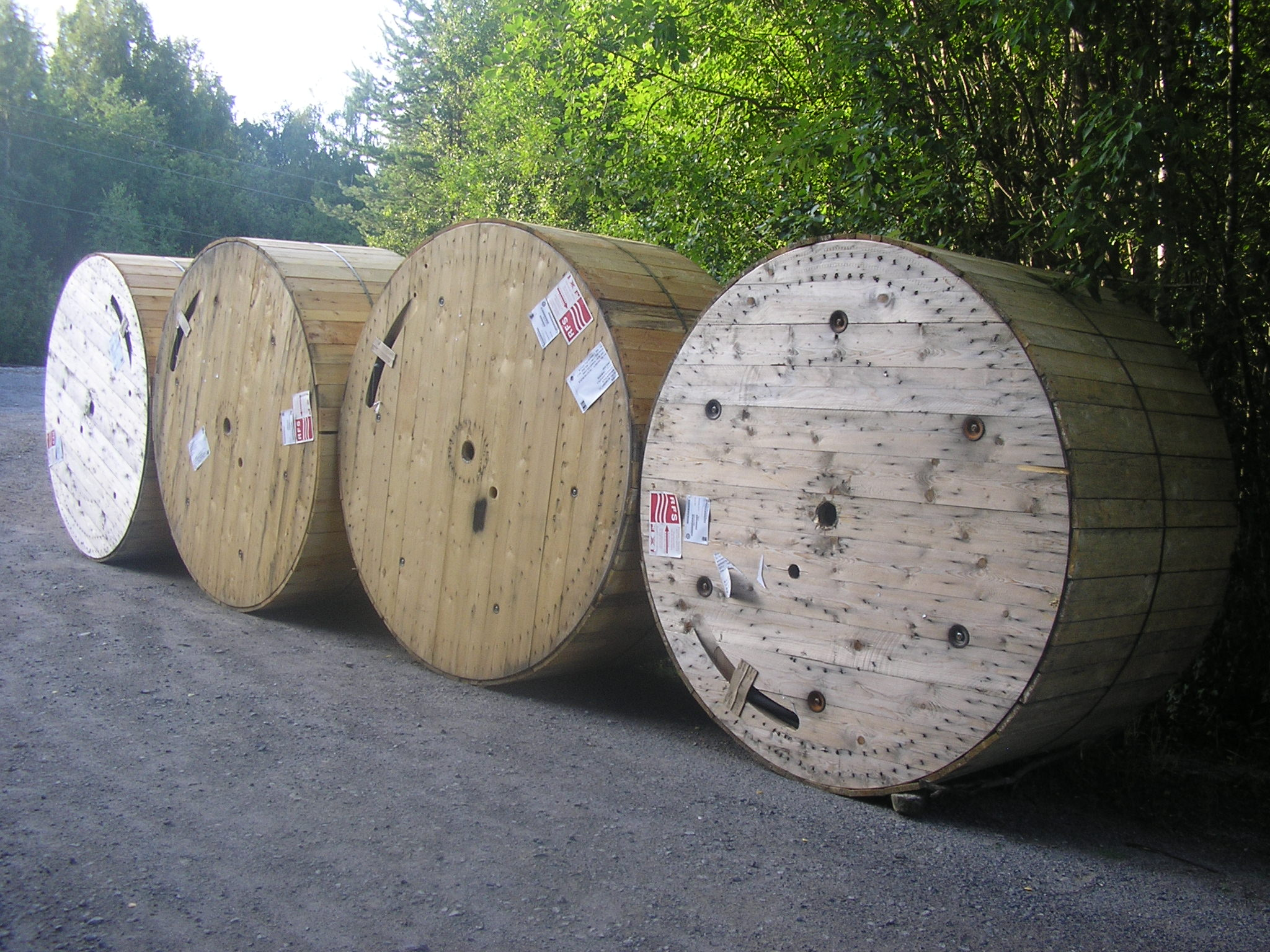
Cable reels in Muurame, Central Finland

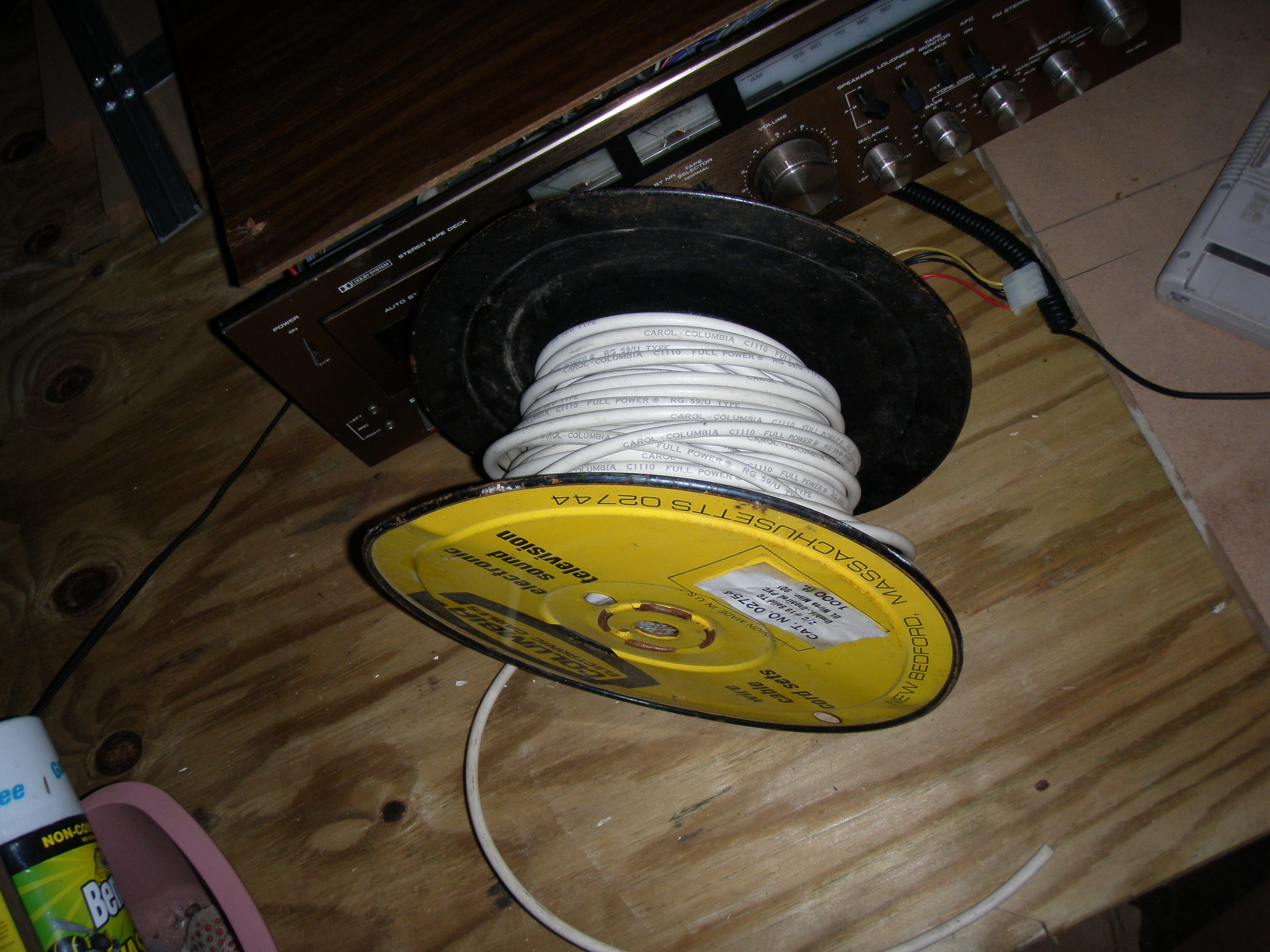
RG-59 cable reel

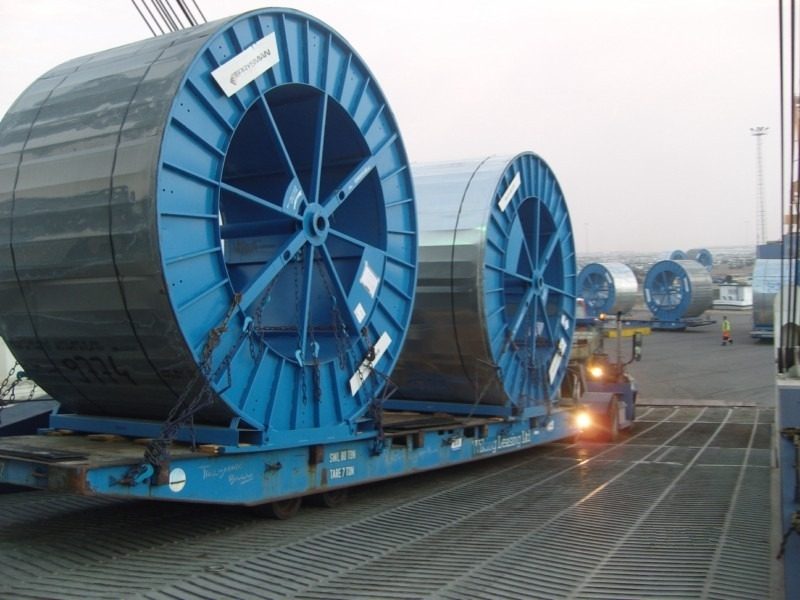
Shipping Roll trailer carrying cable reels

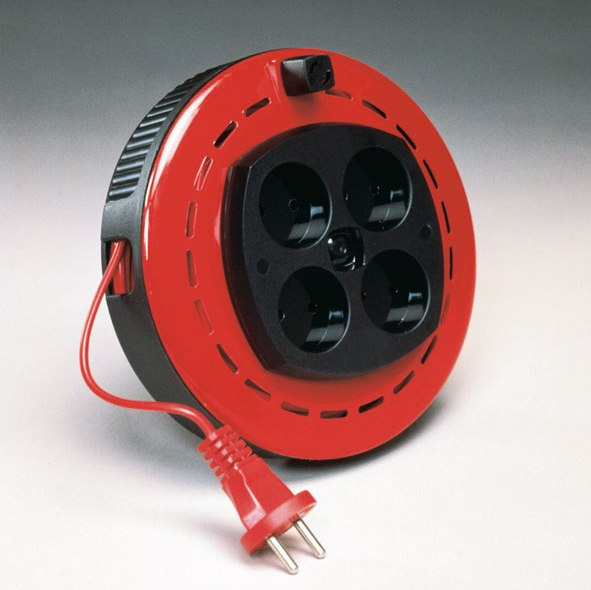
Retractable cable reel

A cable reel is a round, drum-shaped object such as a spool used to carry various types of electrical wires. Cable reels, which can also be termed as drums, have been used for many years to transport electric cables, fiber optic cables and wire products. Cable reels usually come in four different types, each with their own uses: wood, plywood, plastic and steel.

== Wooden drums ==
Wooden drums come in three different varieties: steel-tyred for multiple use, export for sending abroad, and one-way drums for single trip use. Wooden drums can carry heavy loads and are constructed in resinous wood.

Discarded wooden reels can often be obtained cheaply and are, owing to their shape, commonly used as furniture (usually coffee tables) for college students and others seeking inexpensive furnishings.

== Plywood drums/reels ==
Plywood reels are used for transporting lighter loads and are a cheaper alternative to other types of drums, used extensively in the building industry and by commercial electricians. Often made of birch or poplar ply, they are both strong and light-weight. In normal situations, plywood reels are used only once and then destroyed.

== Plastic drums/reels ==
Often manufactured from recycled plastic, these reels are environmentally friendly and used for lighter weight cables.

== Steel drums/reels ==
Nowadays the steel drums have replaced the orthodox wooden drums in the cable and wire industry, but mainly in the offshore industry. Steel drums are normally welded as a fixed drum, but collapsible steel drums also exist. The steel reels/drums are manufactured in an eco-friendly manner and are more durable than wooden drums, but at a significantly higher cost. These steel reels are not as easily stolen. The offshore industry today prefers steel reels/drums instead of wooden, plywood or plastic reels/drums, but the traditional land based industry prefers wooden drums due to their lower cost. The steel reels can be loaded with different ranges of cables and wires from the most heavy cables to the lightest wires.

== Retractable cable reels ==
Certain cable reels are built with a retracting mechanism built in and mostly called extension cord (US), extension cable or extension reel. In most cases, the cables on these reels carry mains electricity, though a similar mechanism is used for air hoses. Retractable cable reels are particularly useful for environments where access to electricity or air is needed in a wide variety of places. All retractable hose reels operate using a constant-force spring to provide torsion for the spool, and a ratcheting mechanism to prevent the cable from retracting while it is being used.
