= ISO 1629 =

ISO standard

ISO 1629, Rubber and latices – Nomenclature is an ISO standard.

This standard was originally published in 1976, and was updated in 1987, 1995 (with amendments in 2007 and 2009) and 2013.
