= Amgu Airport =

- IATA: AEM; ICAO: UHTG

Summary
- Location: Amgu, Primorsky Krai, Russia
- Elevation AMSL: 10 ft / 3 m
- Coordinates: 45°50′28.536″N 137°40′24.8448″E

Map
- Location of the airport in Russia AEM (Russia)

Amgu Airport (IATA: AEM, ICAO: UHTG) is an airport in Amgu, Primorsky Krai, Russia.
