= Societé d'Application Electro-Mécanique =

The Societé d'Application Electro-Mécanique was a French electric car manufacturer based in Neuilly, near Paris.

In 1923, the company manufactured a few cyclecars under the brand name Electrocyclette.

Between 1924 and 1927, the company went on to build mainly delivery vans, whose top speed was 25/30 km/h (around 15-19 mph), with a range of about 80–100 km (50–60 miles). The batteries were under the seats, and the motor was under a short bonnet driving the front wheels.
