= AEM rubber =

AEM rubber, also abbreviated AECM (ISO 1629), is an ethylene acrylic rubber with the formula: -(-CH_{2}-CH_{2}-)_{x}-(CH(CO-OCH_{3})-CH_{2}-)_{y}-C-R(COOH)-)_{z}-
