= Garter spring =

Circular steel spring

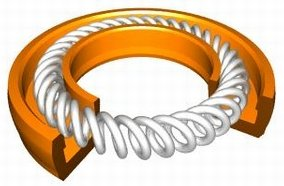
A garter spring inside a rubber seal

A garter spring is a coiled steel spring that is connected at each end to create a circular shape, and is used in oil seals, shaft seals, belt-driven motors, and electrical connectors. Compression garter springs exert outward radial forces, while extension garter springs exert inward radial forces. The manufacturing process is similar to the creation of regular coiled springs, with the addition of joining the ends together. Like most other springs, garter springs are typically manufactured with either carbon steel or stainless steel wire.

== Types of Springs ==
=== Compression Springs ===
Compression garter springs are a type of coiled spring that exerts outward radial forces away from the center. They are typically made up of a thick steel wire with large coils; compression springs need to be able to handle very large loads while being able to return to their natural extended position. Compression springs store potential energy when they are compressed (length of spring decreases), and exert kinetic energy when released. Compression garter springs use this principle to withstand forces acting on it from outside. They may be placed inside a circular object to maintain the object's circular shape. This is similar to squeezing a rubber ball; the ball will contract when squeezed but will return to its natural state once the external pressure is released.

=== Extension Springs ===
Extension garter springs are on the opposite side of the spring spectrum. Although they are also a type of coiled spring, extension garter springs exert inward radial forces that move toward the center. Extension springs store potential energy in their extended form and want to contract. Thinner wire and a greater number of coils allow extension springs to be able to contract quickly, which is essential when dealing with pressurized fluids and gases. Extension garter springs act against forces from the center, so they may be placed on the outside of a circular object to maintain the object's circular shape. They act similar to a bracelet, which is extended to fit around the hand and then snaps back into shape on the wrist. Extension garter springs are more common than compression garter springs because they use less material (smaller circumference and thinner wire) and they respond to changes quicker and more efficiently.

== Manufacturing ==
=== Process ===
There are four main stages for the production of steel garter springs. The first step is to cut and coil reels of steel wire to produce normal coiled springs. The strength of the spring is proportional to the thickness of the wire. Compression springs are coiled in such a way that the coils are more spaced apart, while extension springs have no space between the coils.

The second step is to join each end of the spring to form the garter spring's unique circular shape. This can be accomplished through a few different ways:

- Interlocking the loops at both ends of the spring.
- Using a short connector with a hook on one end and a loop on the other to attach the loops.
- Reducing the diameter on one end of the spring so that it fits into the other end (nib joint). This is the most common method used. It is crucial to back-wind the spring to prevent twisting tension that could deform the spring.

The third stage is heat treating, which prevents the spring from being too brittle to function. Heat treating involves placing the spring in an oven at high temperature for a predetermined amount of time, and then letting it cool slowly.

The fourth stage is applying the finishing touches to the spring, which may include grinding (flattening the ends of the spring), shot peening (shooting tiny steel balls at the spring to harden the wire further), setting (permanently fixing the length and pitch of the spring), coating (electroplating or applying paint or rubber to the surface to prevent corrosion), and packaging.

=== Materials ===
Carbon steel wire is typically used for garter springs due to its affordable price and usability, in comparison to stainless steel. Carbon steel springs tend to have very high yield strengths, and are able to return to their original shape when temporarily deformed. The carbon content in carbon steel wires range from 0.50 to 0.95 percent. This relatively small amount of carbon is enough to improve the toughness of the spring. The close proximity to oil and high-pressure engines mean heat treated garter springs are essential for enduring temperatures over 100 °C (212 °F). However, carbon steel is not suitable for highly corrosive environments; stainless steel would be a more viable option. Stainless steel differs from carbon steel in the amount of chromium present; stainless steel has between 10.5% to 11% chromium by mass, while carbon steel has about 1%.

== Applications ==
Most garter springs are used for oil seals and shaft seals. Since they are able to withstand forces from all directions, garter springs are effective at handling changes in volume, pressure, temperature, and viscosity.
