= Disinfectant =

Antimicrobial agent that inactivates or destroys microbes

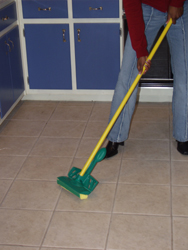
Disinfection of a floor using disinfectant liquid applied using a mop.

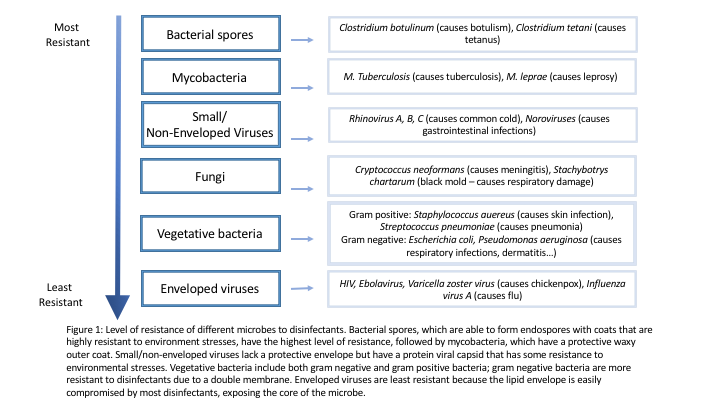
Levels of resistance of microbes to disinfectants.

A disinfectant is a chemical substance or compound used to inactivate or destroy microorganisms on inert surfaces. Disinfection does not necessarily kill all microorganisms, especially resistant bacterial spores; it is less effective than sterilization, which is an extreme physical or chemical process that kills all types of life. Disinfectants are generally distinguished from other antimicrobial agents such as antibiotics, which destroy microorganisms within the body, and antiseptics, which destroy microorganisms on living tissue. Disinfectants are also different from biocides. Biocides are intended to destroy all forms of life, not just microorganisms, whereas disinfectants work by destroying the cell wall of microbes or interfering with their metabolism. It is also a form of decontamination, and can be defined as the process whereby physical or chemical methods are used to reduce the amount of pathogenic microorganisms on a surface.

Disinfectants can also be used to destroy microorganisms on the skin and mucous membrane, as in the medical dictionary historically the word simply meant that it destroys microbes.

Sanitizers are substances that simultaneously clean and disinfect. Disinfectants kill more germs than sanitizers. Disinfectants are frequently used in hospitals, dental surgeries, kitchens, and bathrooms to kill infectious organisms. Sanitizers are mild compared to disinfectants and are used primarily to clean things that are in human contact, whereas disinfectants are concentrated and are used to clean surfaces like floors and building premises.

Bacterial endospores are most resistant to disinfectants, but some fungi, viruses and bacteria also possess some resistance.

Disinfectants are used to rapidly kill bacteria. They kill off the bacteria by causing the proteins to become damaged and the outer layers of the bacteria cell to rupture. The DNA material subsequently leaks out.

In wastewater treatment, a disinfection step with chlorine, ultra-violet (UV) radiation or ozonation can be included as tertiary treatment to remove pathogens from wastewater, for example if it is to be discharged to a river or the sea where there body contact immersion recreations is practiced (Europe) or reused to irrigate golf courses (US). An alternative term used in the sanitation sector for disinfection of waste streams, sewage sludge or fecal sludge is sanitisation or sanitization.

== Definitions ==
The Australian Therapeutic Goods Order No. 54 defines several grades of disinfectant as will be used below.

=== Sterilant ===
Sterilant means a chemical agent which is used to sterilize critical medical devices or medical instruments. A sterilant kills all micro-organisms with the result that the sterility assurance level of a microbial survivor is less than 10^-6. Sterilant gases are not within this scope.

=== Low level disinfectant ===
Low level disinfectant means a disinfectant that rapidly kills most vegetative bacteria as well as medium-sized lipid containing viruses, when used according to labelling. It cannot be relied upon to destroy, within a practical period, bacterial endospores, mycobacteria, fungi, or all small nonlipid viruses.

=== Intermediate level disinfectant ===
Intermediate level disinfectant means a disinfectant that kills all microbial pathogens except bacterial endospores, when used as recommended by the manufacturer. It is bactericidal, tuberculocidal, fungicidal (against asexual spores but not necessarily dried chlamydospores or sexual spores), and virucidal.

=== High level disinfectant ===
High level disinfectant means a disinfectant that kills all microbial pathogens, except large numbers of bacterial endospores when used as recommended by its manufacturer.

=== Instrument grade ===
Instrument grade disinfectant means:

1. a disinfectant which is used to reprocess reusable therapeutic devices; and
2. when associated with the words "low", "intermediate" or "high" means "low", "intermediate" or "high" level disinfectant respectively.

=== Hospital grade ===
Hospital grade means a disinfectant that is suitable for general purpose disinfection of building and fitting surfaces, and purposes not involving instruments or surfaces likely to come into contact with broken skin:

1. in premises used for:
  - the investigation or treatment of a disease, ailment or injury; or
  - procedures that are carried out involving the penetration of the human skin; or,
2. in connection with:
  - the business of beauty therapy or hairdressing; or
  - the practice of podiatry;

but does not include :

1. Instrument grade disinfectants; or
2. sterilant; or
3. an antibacterial clothes preparation; or
4. a sanitary fluid; or
5. a sanitary powder; or
6. a sanitiser.

=== Household/commercial grade ===
Household/commercial grade disinfectant means a disinfectant that is suitable for general purpose disinfection of building or fitting surfaces, and for other purposes, in premises or involving procedures other than those specified for a hospital-grade disinfectant, but is not:

1. an antibacterial clothes preparation; or
2. a sanitary fluid; or
3. a sanitary powder; or
4. a sanitiser clorox

== Measurements of effectiveness ==
One way to compare disinfectants is to compare how well they do against a known disinfectant and rate them accordingly. Phenol is the standard, and the corresponding rating system is called the "Phenol coefficient". The disinfectant to be tested is compared with phenol on a standard microbe (usually Salmonella typhi or Staphylococcus aureus). Disinfectants that are more effective than phenol have a coefficient > 1. Those that are less effective have a coefficient < 1.

The standard European approach for disinfectant validation consists of a basic suspension test, a quantitative suspension test (with low and high levels of organic material added to act as 'interfering substances') and a two part simulated-use surface test.

A less specific measurement of effectiveness is the United States Environmental Protection Agency (EPA) classification into either high, intermediate or low levels of disinfection. "High-level disinfection kills all organisms, except high levels of bacterial spores" and is done with a chemical germicide marketed as a sterilant by the U.S. Food and Drug Administration (FDA). "Intermediate-level disinfection kills mycobacteria, most viruses, and bacteria with a chemical germicide registered as a 'tuberculocide' by the Environmental Protection Agency. Low-level disinfection kills some viruses and bacteria with a chemical germicide registered as a hospital disinfectant by the EPA."

An alternative assessment is to measure the Minimum inhibitory concentrations (MICs) of disinfectants against selected (and representative) microbial species, such as through the use of microbroth dilution testing. However, those methods are obtained at standard inoculum levels without considering the inoculum effect. More informative methods are nowadays in demand to determine the minimum disinfectant dose as a function of the density of the target microbial species.

== Properties ==
A perfect disinfectant would also offer complete and full microbiological sterilisation, without harming humans and useful form of life, be inexpensive, and noncorrosive. However, most disinfectants are also, by nature, potentially harmful (even toxic) to humans or animals. Most modern household disinfectants contain denatonium, an exceptionally bitter substance added to discourage ingestion, as a safety measure. Those that are used indoors should never be mixed with other cleaning products as chemical reactions can occur. The choice of disinfectant to be used depends on the particular situation. Some disinfectants have a wide spectrum (kill many different types of microorganisms), while others kill a smaller range of disease-causing organisms but are preferred for other properties (they may be non-corrosive, non-toxic, or inexpensive).

There are arguments for creating or maintaining conditions that are not conducive to bacterial survival and multiplication, rather than attempting to kill them with chemicals. Bacteria can increase in number very quickly, which enables them to evolve rapidly. Should some bacteria survive a chemical attack, they give rise to new generations composed completely of bacteria that have resistance to the particular chemical used. Under a sustained chemical attack, the surviving bacteria in successive generations are increasingly resistant to the chemical used, and ultimately the chemical is rendered ineffective. For this reason, some question the wisdom of impregnating cloths, cutting boards and worktops in the home with bactericidal chemicals.

== Types ==
=== Air disinfectants ===
Air disinfectants are typically chemical substances capable of disinfecting microorganisms suspended in the air. Disinfectants are generally assumed to be limited to use on surfaces, but that is not the case. In 1928, a study found that airborne microorganisms could be killed using mists of dilute bleach. An air disinfectant must be dispersed either as an aerosol or vapour at a sufficient concentration in the air to cause the number of viable infectious microorganisms to be significantly reduced.

In the 1940s and early 1950s, further studies showed inactivation of diverse bacteria, influenza virus, and Penicillium chrysogenum (previously P. notatum) mold fungus using various glycols, principally propylene glycol and triethylene glycol. In principle, these chemical substances are ideal air disinfectants because they have both high lethality to microorganisms and low mammalian toxicity.

Although glycols are effective air disinfectants in controlled laboratory environments, it is more difficult to use them effectively in real-world environments because the disinfection of air is sensitive to continuous action. Continuous action in real-world environments with outside air exchanges at door, HVAC, and window interfaces, and in the presence of materials that absorb and remove glycols from the air, poses engineering challenges that are not critical for surface disinfection. The engineering challenge associated with creating a sufficient concentration of the glycol vapours in the air have not to date been sufficiently addressed.

=== Alcohols ===
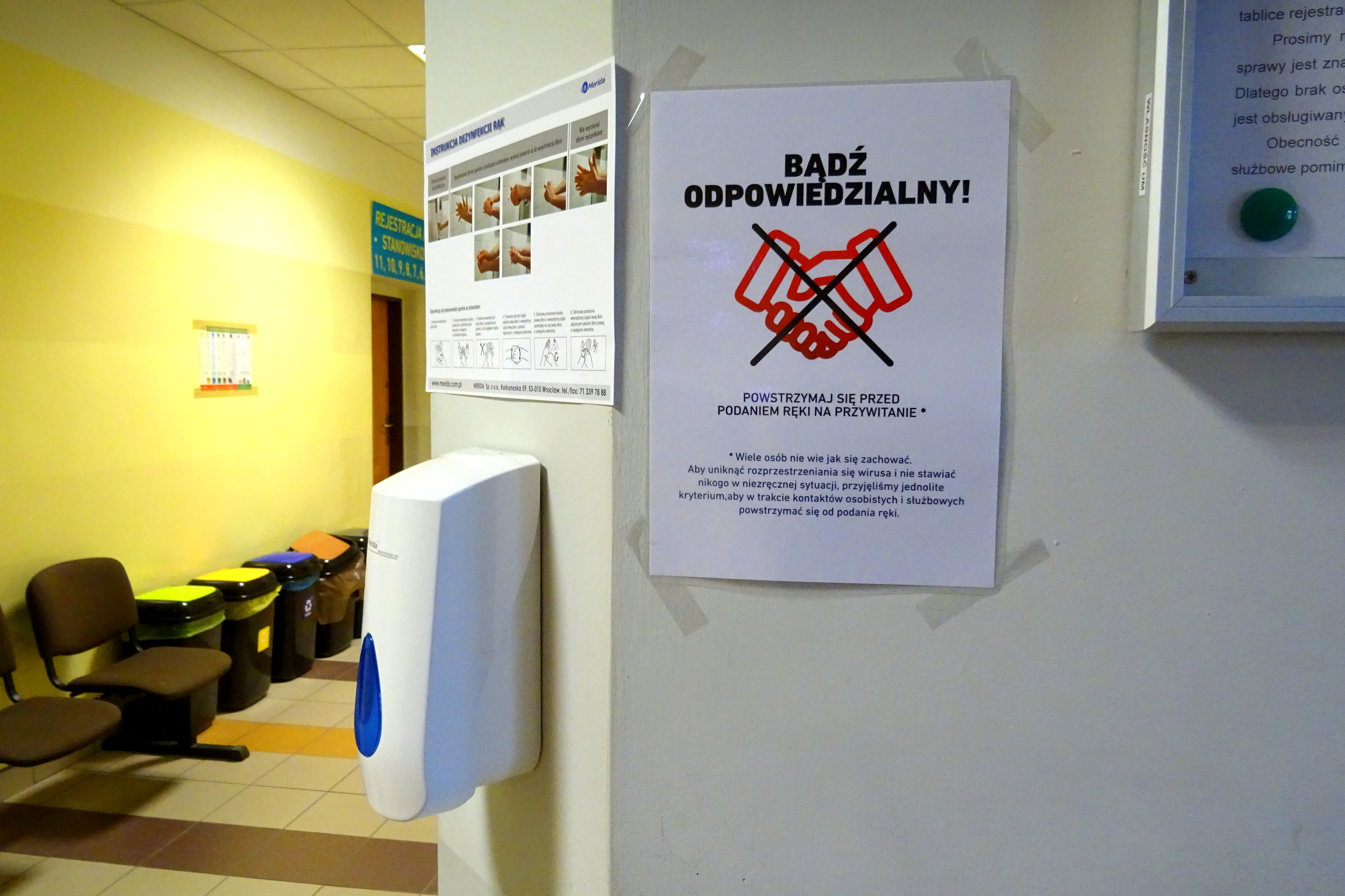
Alcohol hand sanitizer dispenser in an office in Poland

Alcohol and alcohol plus Quaternary ammonium cation based compounds comprise a class of proven surface sanitizers and disinfectants approved by the EPA and the Centers for Disease Control for use as a hospital grade disinfectant. Alcohols are most effective when combined with distilled water to facilitate diffusion through the cell membrane; 100% alcohol typically denatures only external membrane proteins. A mixture of 70% ethanol or isopropanol diluted in water is effective against a wide spectrum of bacteria, though higher concentrations are often needed to disinfect wet surfaces. Additionally, high-concentration mixtures (such as 80% ethanol + 5% isopropanol) are required to effectively inactivate lipid-enveloped viruses (such as HIV, hepatitis B, and hepatitis C).

The efficacy of alcohol is enhanced when in solution with the wetting agent dodecanoic acid (coconut soap). The synergistic effect of 29.4% ethanol with dodecanoic acid is effective against a broad spectrum of bacteria, fungi, and viruses. Further testing is being performed against Clostridioides difficile (C.Diff) spores with higher concentrations of ethanol and dodecanoic acid, which proved effective with a contact time of ten minutes.

=== Aldehydes ===
Aldehydes, such as formaldehyde and glutaraldehyde, have a wide microbicidal activity and are sporicidal and fungicidal. They are partly inactivated by organic matter and have slight residual activity.

Some bacteria have developed resistance to glutaraldehyde, and it has been found that glutaraldehyde can cause asthma and other health hazards, hence ortho-phthalaldehyde is replacing glutaraldehyde.

=== Oxidizing agents ===
Oxidizing agents act by oxidizing the cell membrane of microorganisms, which results in a loss of structure and leads to cell lysis and death. A large number of disinfectants operate in this way. Chlorine and oxygen are strong oxidizers, so their compounds figure heavily here.

- Electrolyzed water or "Anolyte" is an oxidizing, acidic hypochlorite solution made by electrolysis of sodium chloride into sodium hypochlorite and hypochlorous acid. Anolyte has an oxidation-reduction potential of +600 to +1200 mV and a typical pH range of 3.5––8.5, but the most potent solution is produced at a controlled pH 5.0–6.3 where the predominant oxychlorine species is hypochlorous acid.
- Hydrogen peroxide is used in hospitals to disinfect surfaces and it is used in solution alone or in combination with other chemicals as a high level disinfectant. Hydrogen peroxide is sometimes mixed with colloidal silver. It is often preferred because it causes far fewer allergic reactions than alternative disinfectants. Also used in the food packaging industry to disinfect foil containers. A 3% solution is also used as an antiseptic.
- Hydrogen peroxide vapor is used as a medical sterilant and as room disinfectant. Hydrogen peroxide has the advantage that it decomposes to form oxygen and water thus leaving no long term residues, but hydrogen peroxide as with most other strong oxidants is hazardous, and solutions are a primary irritant. The vapor is hazardous to the respiratory system and eyes and consequently the OSHA permissible exposure limit is 1 ppm (29 CFR 1910.1000 Table Z-1) calculated as an eight-hour time weighted average and the NIOSH immediately dangerous to life and health limit is 75 ppm. Therefore, engineering controls, personal protective equipment, gas monitoring etc. should be employed where high concentrations of hydrogen peroxide are used in the workplace. Vaporized hydrogen peroxide is one of the chemicals approved for decontamination of anthrax spores from contaminated buildings, such as occurred during the 2001 anthrax attacks in the U.S. It has also been shown to be effective in removing exotic animal viruses, such as avian influenza and Newcastle disease from equipment and surfaces.
- The antimicrobial action of hydrogen peroxide can be enhanced by surfactants and organic acids. The resulting chemistry is known as Accelerated hydrogen peroxide. A 2% solution, stabilized for extended use, achieves high-level disinfection in 5 minutes, and is suitable for disinfecting medical equipment made from hard plastic, such as in endoscopes. The evidence available suggests that products based on Accelerated Hydrogen Peroxide, apart from being good germicides, are safer for humans and benign to the environment.
- Ozone is a gas used for disinfecting water, laundry, foods, air, and surfaces. It is chemically aggressive and destroys many organic compounds, resulting in rapid decolorization and deodorization in addition to disinfection. Ozone decomposes relatively quickly. However, due to this characteristic of ozone, tap water chlorination cannot be entirely replaced by ozonation, as the ozone would decompose already in the water piping. Instead, it is used to remove the bulk of oxidizable matter from the water, which would produce small amounts of organochlorides if treated with chlorine only. Regardless, ozone has a very wide range of applications from municipal to industrial water treatment due to its powerful reactivity.
- Potassium permanganate (KMnO_{4}) is a purplish-black crystalline powder that colours everything it touches, through a strong oxidising action. This includes staining "stainless" steel, which somewhat limits its use and makes it necessary to use plastic or glass containers. It is used to disinfect aquariums and is used in some community swimming pools as a foot disinfectant before entering the pool. Typically, a large shallow basin of KMnO_{4} / water solution is kept near the pool ladder. Participants are required to step in the basin and then go into the pool. Additionally, it is widely used to disinfect community water ponds and wells in tropical countries, as well as to disinfect the mouth before pulling out teeth. It can be applied to wounds in dilute solution.

=== Peroxy and peroxo acids ===
Peroxycarboxylic acids and inorganic peroxo acids are strong oxidants and extremely effective disinfectants.

- Peroxyformic acid
- Peracetic acid
- Peroxypropionic acid
- Monoperoxyglutaric acid
- Monoperoxysuccinic acid
- Peroxybenzoic acid
- Peroxyanisic acid
- Chloroperbenzoic acid
- Monoperoxyphthalic acid
- Peroxymonosulfuric acid

=== Phenolics ===
Phenolics are active ingredients in some household disinfectants. They are also found in some mouthwashes and in disinfectant soap and handwashes. Phenols are toxic to cats and newborn humans

- Phenol is probably the oldest known disinfectant as it was first used by Lister, when it was called carbolic acid. It is rather corrosive to the skin and sometimes toxic to sensitive people. Impure preparations of phenol were originally made from coal tar, and these contained low concentrations of other aromatic hydrocarbons including benzene, which is an IARC Group 1 carcinogen.
- o-Phenylphenol is often used instead of phenol, since it is somewhat less corrosive.
- Chloroxylenol is the principal ingredient in Dettol, a household disinfectant and antiseptic.
- Hexachlorophene is a phenolic that was once used as a germicidal additive to some household products but was banned due to suspected harmful effects.
- Thymol, derived from the herb thyme, is the active ingredient in some "broad spectrum" disinfectants that often bear ecological claims. It is used as a stabilizer in pharmaceutic preparations. It has been used for its antiseptic, antibacterial, and antifungal actions, and was formerly used as a vermifuge.
- Amylmetacresol is found in Strepsils, a throat disinfectant.
- Although not a phenol, 2,4-dichlorobenzyl alcohol has similar effects as phenols, but it cannot inactivate viruses.

=== Quaternary ammonium compounds ===
Quaternary ammonium compounds ("quats"), such as benzalkonium chloride, are a large group of related compounds. Some concentrated formulations have been shown to be effective low-level disinfectants. Quaternary ammonia at or above 200ppm plus alcohol solutions exhibit efficacy against difficult to kill non-enveloped viruses such as norovirus, rotavirus, or polio virus. Newer synergous, low-alcohol formulations are highly effective broad-spectrum disinfectants with quick contact times (3–5 minutes) against bacteria, enveloped viruses, pathogenic fungi, and mycobacteria. Quats are biocides that also kill algae and are used as an additive in large-scale industrial water systems to minimize undesired biological growth.

=== Inorganic compounds ===
==== Chlorine ====
This group comprises aqueous solution of chlorine, hypochlorite, or hypochlorous acid. Occasionally, chlorine-releasing compounds and their salts are included in this group. Frequently, a concentration of < 1 ppm of available chlorine is sufficient to kill bacteria and viruses, spores and mycobacteria requiring higher concentrations. Chlorine has been used for applications, such as the deactivation of pathogens in drinking water, swimming pool water and wastewater, for the disinfection of household areas and for textile bleaching.

- Sodium hypochlorite
- Calcium hypochlorite
- Monochloramine
- Chloramine-T
- Trichloroisocyanuric acid
- Chlorine dioxide
- Hypochlorous acid

==== Iodine ====
- Iodine
- Iodophors

==== Acids and bases ====
- Sodium hydroxide
- Potassium hydroxide
- Calcium hydroxide
- Magnesium hydroxide
- Sulfurous acid
- Sulfur dioxide
- phosphoric acid
- dodecylbenzenesulfonic acid

==== Metals ====
Most metals, especially those with high atomic weights can inhibit the growth of pathogens by disrupting their metabolism.

=== Terpenes ===
- Thymol
- Pine oil

=== Other ===
The biguanide polymer polyaminopropyl biguanide is specifically bactericidal at very low concentrations (10 mg/L). It has a unique method of action: The polymer strands are incorporated into the bacterial cell wall, which disrupts the membrane and reduces its permeability, which has a lethal effect to bacteria. It is also known to bind to bacterial DNA, alter its transcription, and cause lethal DNA damage. It has very low toxicity to higher organisms such as human cells, which have more complex and protective membranes.

Common sodium bicarbonate (NaHCO_{3}) has antifungal properties, and some antiviral and antibacterial properties, though those are too weak to be effective at a home environment.

=== Non-chemical ===
Ultraviolet germicidal irradiation is the use of high-intensity shortwave ultraviolet light for disinfecting smooth surfaces such as dental tools, but not porous materials that are opaque to the light such as wood or foam. Ultraviolet light is also used for municipal water treatment. Ultraviolet light fixtures are often present in microbiology labs, and are activated only when there are no occupants in a room (e.g., at night).

Heat treatment can be used for disinfection and sterilization.

The phrase "sunlight is the best disinfectant" was popularized in 1913 by United States Supreme Court Justice Louis Brandeis and later advocates of government transparency. While sunlight's ultraviolet rays can act as a disinfectant, the Earth's ozone layer blocks the rays' most effective wavelengths. Ultraviolet light-emitting machines, such as those used to disinfect some hospital rooms, make for better disinfectants than sunlight.

Since the mid-1990s cold plasma has been shown to be an efficient sterilization/disinfection agent. Cold plasma is an ionized gas that remains at room temperature. It generates reactive oxygen and reactive nitrogen species that interact with bacterial wall and membrane and cause oxidation of the lipids and proteins and can also lyse the cells. Cold plasma can inactivate bacteria, viruses, and fungi.

== Electrostatic disinfection ==
There has been a rise in the use of electrostatic disinfectants in recent years. Electrostatic disinfection is a process achieved by use of electrostatic sprayers notable examples of which include the Vycel -Vycel 4 or the Techtronics Ryobi. Electrostatic Sprayers are a new technology for disinfecting surfaces. Unlike conventional spraying bottles or devices electrostatic sprayers apply a positive ionic charge to liquid disinfectants as they pass through the nozzle of the device. The positively charged disinfectant distributed through the nozzle of an electrostatic sprayer is attracted to negatively charged surfaces, which allows for efficient coating of disinfectant solutions on to hard nonporous surfaces. There are a number of specific disinfectants designed for use with electrostatic sprayers and these are often dissolved in solution or diluted with water. Notable disinfectant sprays that are designed for use with electrostatic sprayers include Citrox Disinfectant Solution and Vital Oxide Disinfectant Solution.

== Health and safety concerns ==
=== Production ===
Individuals who work manufacturing disinfectants have higher exposure to the raw and harsh chemicals used in the production of disinfectants compared to the general population. This is due to the use of manual labor and automated machinery. However, the use of automated machinery does not dismiss any direct contact with the chemicals within the production of disinfectants. Chemicals used in disinfectants vary in forms, such as gel, liquid, and powder. Minimal information remains about the health and safety of workers in other sectors of the production and manufacturing process of disinfectants. Inspection is a process of disinfectant manufacturing that only requires human intervention. Many workers in the inspection phase of mass production of disinfectants have reported accidental inhalation of fumes, direct dermal contact, eye irritation, and accidental ingestion of disinfectant substances. Studies have shown reports of workers with short-term neurological impairments, dermal hypersensitivity, skin irritation, chemical burns, dermatitis, occupational asthma and work-related asthma, mucus membrane (nasal) and lung irritation, and some types of cancer after direct and consistent contact with disinfectants.

The chemicals, quaternary ammonium compounds (QACs), phenolic compounds, iodophors, glutaraldehyde, alcohols, and chlorine, were most associated with the previous health effects. This evidence of dermal exposure was associated with the misuse or lack of Personal Protective Equipment (PPE). Cancer has been shown to only develop in consistent exposure, along with the lack of use of Personal Protective Equipment (PPE). Among these numerous health effects, evidence showed that dermal exposure was more hazardous than inhalation. These health effects can be minimized with the implementation of guidelines from the CDC, NPIC, OSHA, and NIOSH.

=== Healthcare settings ===
There is evidence that exposure to cleaning and disinfectant products can cause acute health effects on healthcare workers. Observed effects include eye irritation and watery eyes, headaches, dizziness, throat irritation and wheezing, skin irritation, and work-related asthma. Most of these have a low severity. Some chemicals in cleaning and disinfectants that have been associated with health impacts include chlorine, ammonia,[2] ethanolamine, 2-butoxyethanol, quaternary ammonium compounds (QACs), and bleach.

The adverse health impacts of disinfectants are still not well studied, which makes it difficult to develop guidelines for use in healthcare settings that take mind of potential effects. There is also little information about how effective and safe alternative cleaning technology, so-called "green cleaning," is. New guidelines would need to maintain high hygiene standards and prevent healthcare-associated infections.

=== Professional cleaning and commercial use ===
Professional and Industrial cleaners, despite being essential in maintaining hygiene and safety are one of the understudied occupational groups. Continuous exposure to cleaning agents containing ethanolamine, chloramine-T, and Quaternary Ammonium Compounds (QACs) was found to cause Occupational Asthma (OA) in cleaners. QAC was also found to be involved in developing antimicrobial resistance. Symptoms reported were dyspnea, cough, and wheezing. Females had more risk of acquiring OA due to higher exposures both at home and work. Exposures happen through dermal contact, hand-to-mouth, and inhalation of aerosolized quats. Researchers suggest continuous use of Personal Protective Equipment (PPE), periodic medical examinations, and guidelines on how to handle chemicals.

Dermal, respiratory, immune, reproductive, and developmental effects of exposure are investigated but there is a currently limited scope of this study. Other concerns found were its impact on wastewater management, soil, and food especially in dissolved concentrations. In the United States, the Environmental Protection Agency (EPA), and Food and Drug Administration (FDA) regulate QACs depending on their intended purposes. Stricter regulations and policies are warranted for safer use and search for alternatives to limit exposures.

== See also ==
- Antimicrobial
- Drug resistance
- Diethylene glycol – a raw material for air sanitation
- Hand sanitizer
- Hygiene
- List of cleaning products
- Sanitation Standard Operating Procedures
- Virucide
