= Nin Jiom Pei Pa Koa =

Chinese herbal throat remedy

The logo of King To Nin Jiom (read from right to left)

King-to Nin Jiom Pei Pa Koa (Chinese: 京都念慈菴川貝枇杷膏; Jyutping: ging1 dou1 nim6 ci4 am1 cyun1 bui3 pei4 paa4 gou1; pinyin: Jīngdū niàn cí ān chuānbèi pípá gāo), commonly known as Nin Jiom Pei Pa Koa or simply Nin Jiom Herbal Cough Syrup, is a Hong Kong Chinese patent medicine used for the relief of sore throat, coughs, hoarseness and aphonia. It is a throat demulcent and expectorant.

The brand diversified to also produce a number of other Chinese patent medicines such as Sho-saiko-to and Siwu Tang in 1993. It started producing throat lozenges in 1997 based on the original syrup. A sugar-free version of the original syrup was released in 2025.

== Name ==
The name is in Cantonese. In the name of the company, king-to (Chinese: 京都; Jyutping: ging^{1} dou^{1}) means "capital", referring to Beijing, and nin jiom (Chinese: 念慈菴; Jyutping: nim^{6} ci^{4} am^{1}) means "in memory of my mother"; hence, it stresses the important virtue of filial piety. In Pei Pa Koa, pei pa (Chinese: 枇杷; Jyutping: pei^{4} paa^{4}) is Cantonese for "loquat", while koa (Chinese: 膏; Jyutping: kou^{1}) means "syrup", though it is unclear how the spelling came to be (one suggestion is Hokkien: Chinese: 膏仔; Pe̍h-ōe-jī: ko-á).

The product is marketed under the brand name Cap Ibu dan Anak (Malay for "Mother and Son Brand", referring to the brand's logo) in Malaysia, Singapore and Indonesia, also acronymed as OBIDA (as in Obat Batuk Ibu dan Anak) in the lattermost country.

== History ==
The formula for pei pa koa was reportedly created by Ip Tin-see, a Qing dynasty physician born in 1680. Ip was asked by county commander Yang Chin to treat his mother's persistent cough. They were so impressed that they created a factory to mass-produce it. In 1946, the Yang family sold the business to Tse Sui-bong, a medicine practitioner, who founded the Nin Jiom Medicine Manufactory in British Hong Kong. The company was formally incorporated in 1962, and continue to manufacture and sell the product worldwide. The headquarters of the company are located in Hong Kong and Taoyuan, Taiwan.

Availability and marketing of the product expanded in the 1980s, and today it is easily found in North America, most often in Chinese groceries and herbal stores.

Pei pa koa had annual sales of HK$350 million in 2014.

== Effectiveness ==
A China Academy of Traditional Chinese Medicine study published in a 1994 article, Pharmacological studies of nin jion pei pa koa, states that the syrup had significant cough-relieving and sputum-removing effects. In four acute or sub-acute inflammatory models, the anti-inflammatory effect was marked.

== Composition ==
Pei pa koa is made up of a blend of herbal ingredients including the fritillary bulb (Bulbus fritillariae cirrhosae, 川貝母), loquat leaf (Eriobotrya japonica, 枇鈀葉), fourleaf ladybell root (Adenophora tetraphylla, 南沙參), Indian bread (Wolfiporia extensa, 茯苓), pomelo peel (Citrus maxima, 化橘紅), chinese bellflower root (Platycodon grandiflorum, 桔梗), prepared pinellia rhizome (Pinellia ternata, 半夏), Schisandra seed (Schisandra chinensis, 五味子), Trichosanthes seed (Trichosanthes kirilowii, 栝蔞), coltsfoot flower (Tussilago farfara, 款冬花), Thinleaf Milkwort root (Polygala tenuifolia, 遠志), bitter apricot kernel (Prunus armeniaca, 苦杏仁), fresh ginger (Zingiber officinale, 生薑), licorice root (Glycyrrhiza uralensis, 甘草), and menthol in a syrup and honey base.

== See also ==
- Cough medicine
