= CH2O3 =

The molecular formula CH_{2}O_{3} (molar mass: 62.02 g/mol, exact mass: 62.0004 u) may refer to:

- Carbonic acid
- Performic acid (PFA)
