= Throat lozenge =

Medicated tablet to be dissolved in the mouth

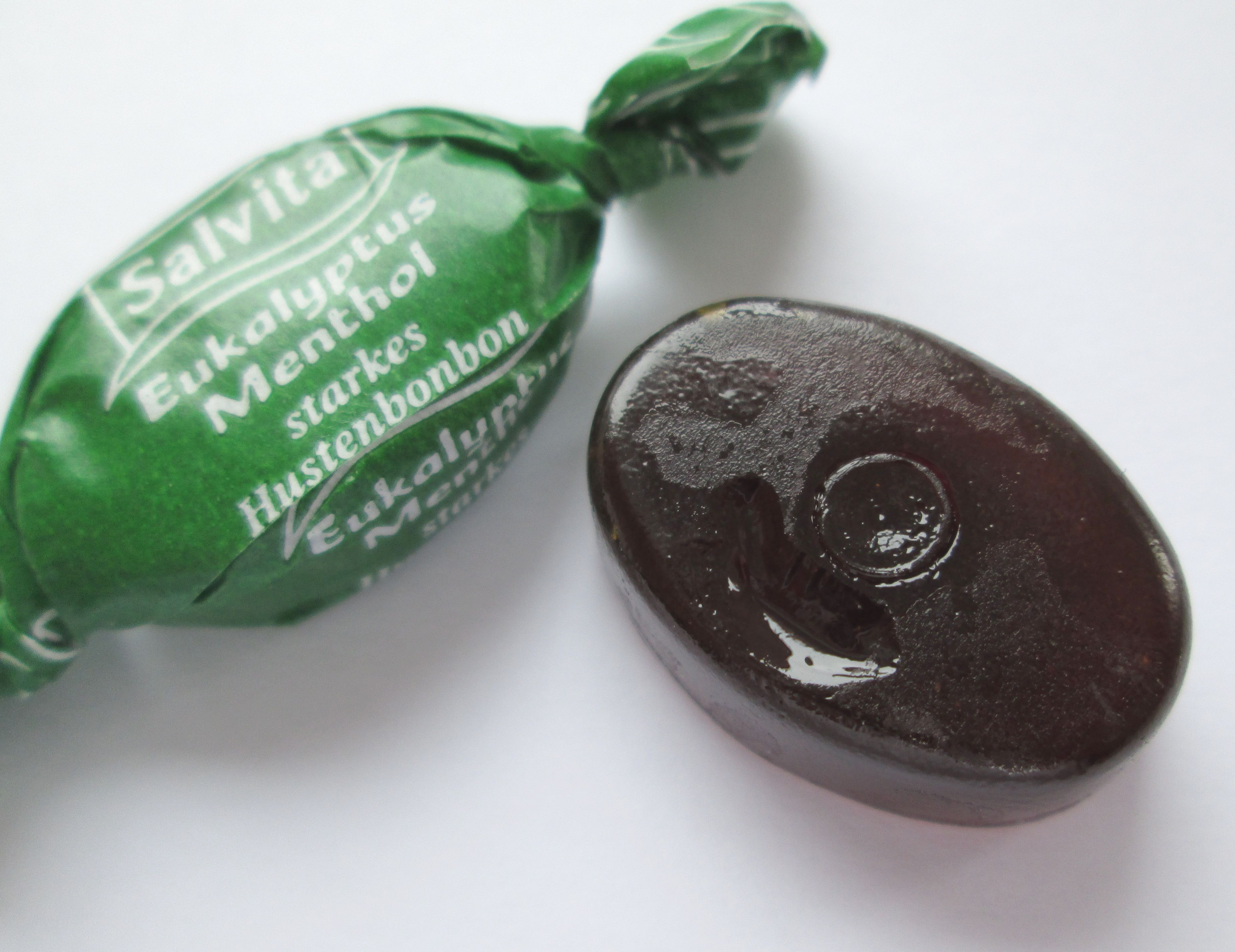
- Modern cough drops
- Alternative names: Cough drop; Cough sweet

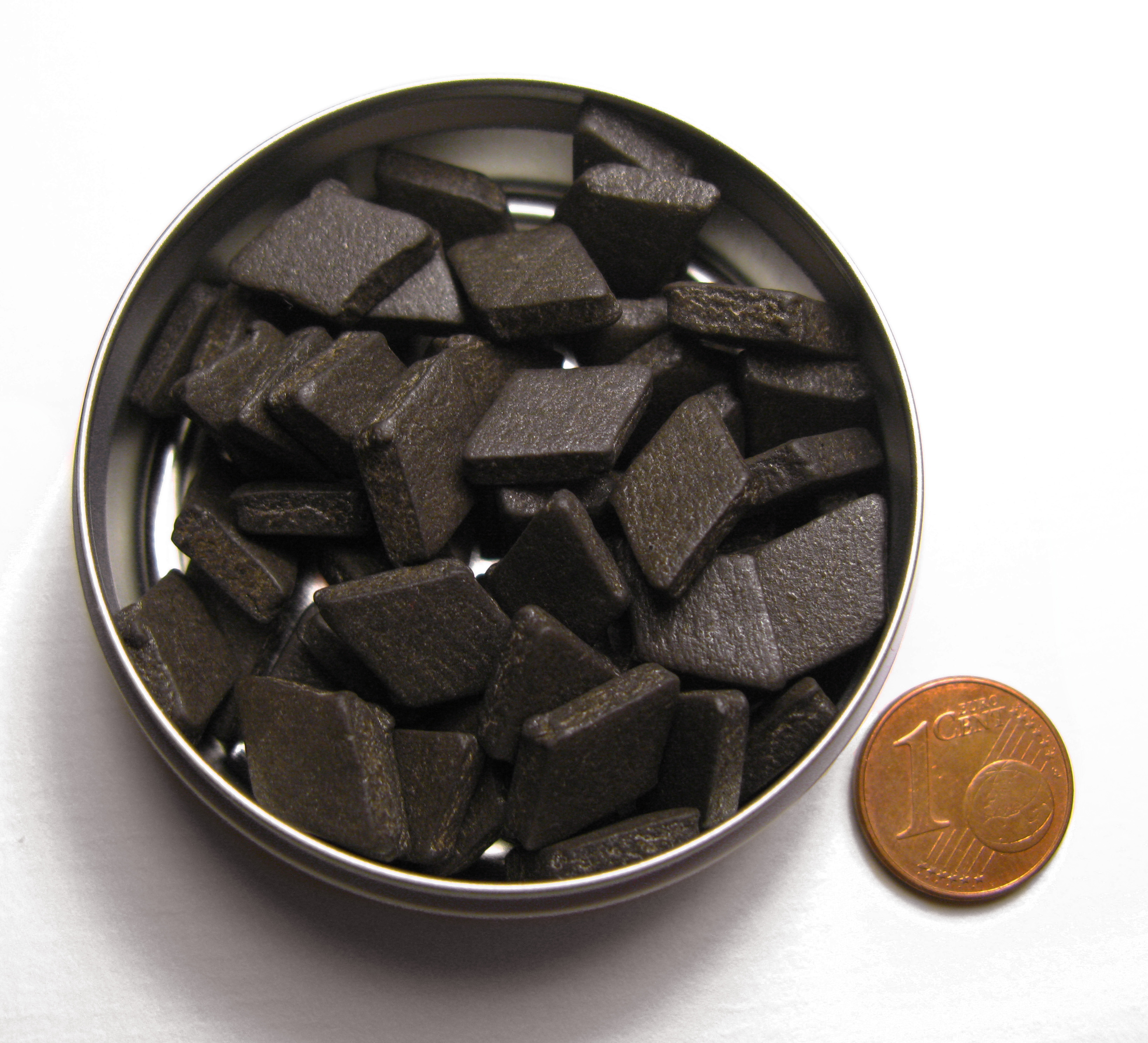
A pocket tin containing small salmiak liquorice pastilles in the traditional diamond shape lozenge. In Europe, salmiak liquorice pastilles are considered a "traditionally-applied medicine to assist expectoration in the airways".

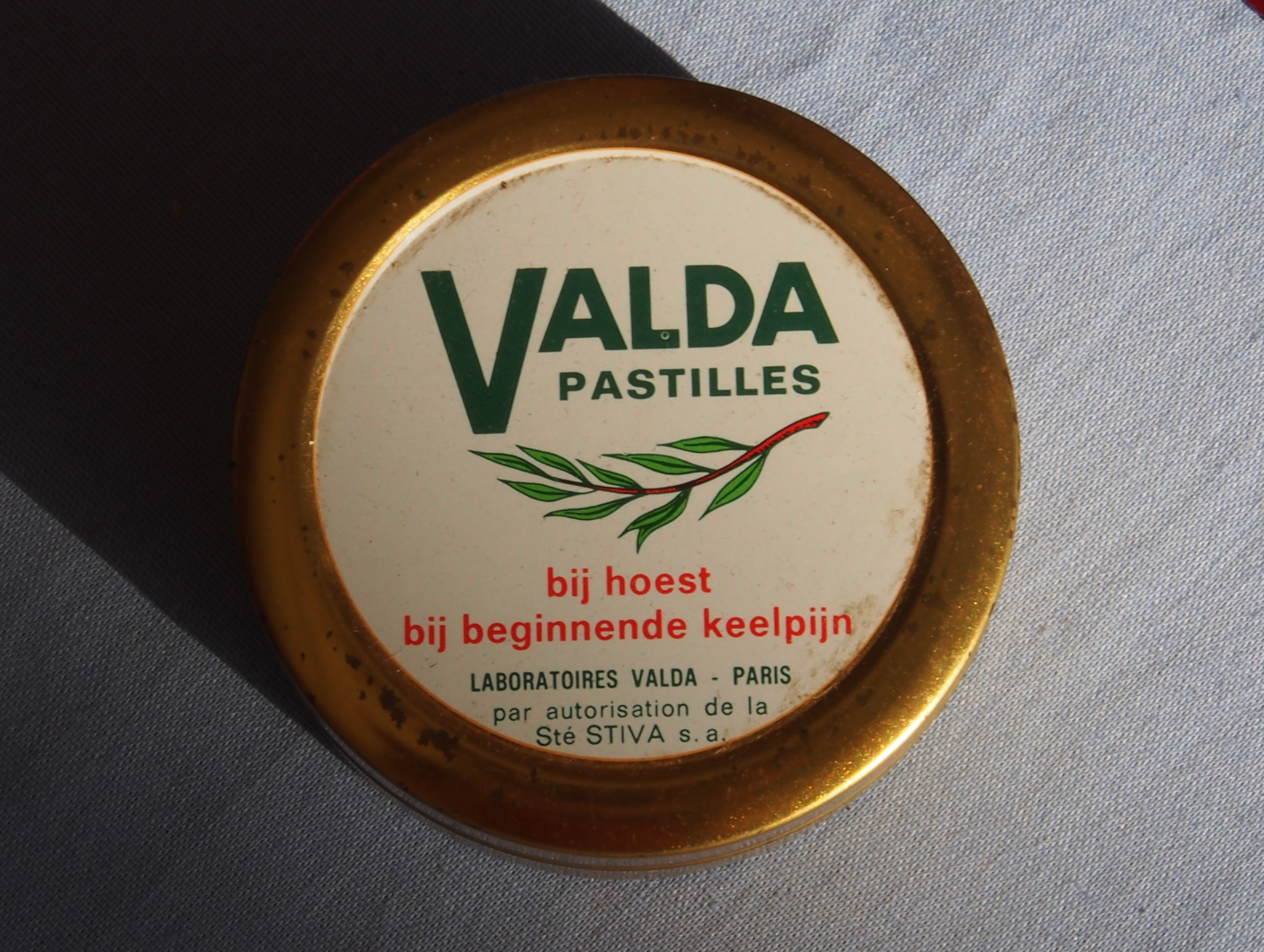
Valda mint eucalyptus gumdrops

A throat lozenge (also known as a cough drop, sore throat sweet, troche, cachou, pastille or cough sweet) is a small, typically medicated tablet intended to be dissolved slowly in the mouth to temporarily stop coughs, lubricate, and soothe irritated tissues of the throat (usually due to a sore throat or strep throat), possibly from the common cold or influenza. Cough tablets have taken the name lozenge, based on their original shape, a diamond.

== Ingredients ==
Some throat lozenges contain active ingredients such as benzocaine (anaesthetic), or amylmetacresol (mild antiseptic) or 2,4-Dichlorobenzyl alcohol (mild antiseptic) or 4-Hexylresorcinol (anaesthetic, antiseptic) or dextromethorphan (cough suppressant). Many varieties such as Halls contain menthol, peppermint oil or spearmint as their active ingredients. Some may contain other essential oils (generally cooling ones) such as eucalyptus oil and methyl salicylate. Non-menthol throat lozenges generally use either zinc gluconate glycine or pectin as an oral demulcent. Honey lozenges are also available.

The purpose of the throat lozenge is to calm the irritation that may be felt in the throat while swallowing, breathing, or even drinking certain fluids. However, one study found that excessive use of menthol cough drops can prolong coughs rather than relieve them.

== History ==
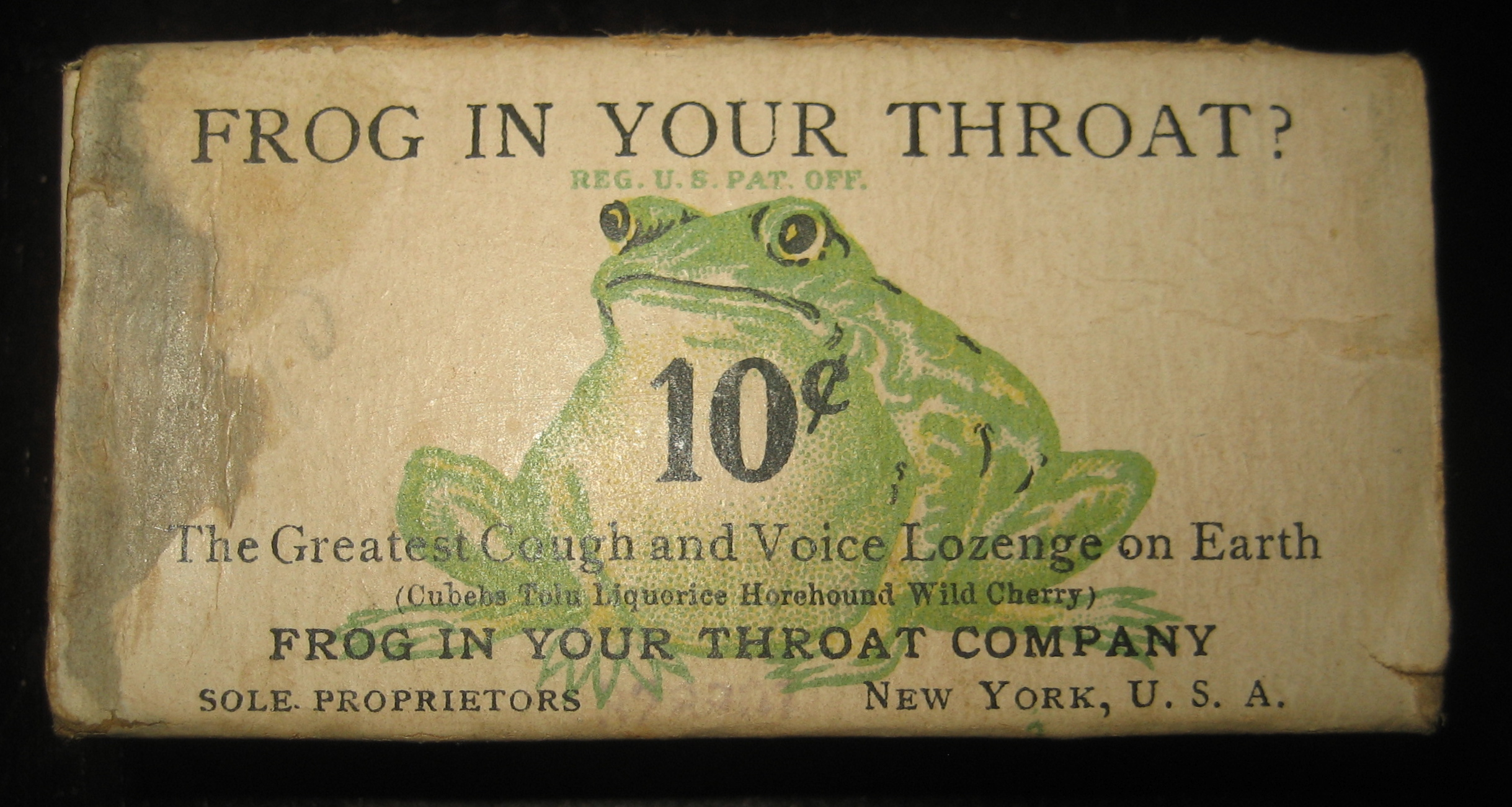
Early 20th century "Frog In Your Throat" box, containing lozenges made of cubeb, tolu balsam, liquorice, white horehound and wild cherry extracts

Sweets to soothe the throat are thought to date back to 1000 BC in Egypt's Twentieth Dynasty, when they were made from honey flavored with citrus, herbs, and spices. Honey itself has been documented as a very common pharmaceutical ingredient and delivery vehicle in ancient Egyptian medicine, including as an anti-cough remedy. In the 19th century, physicians discovered morphine and heroin, which suppress the cough reflex. Popular formulations of that era which incorporated opiates included Smith Brothers Cough Drops, first advertised in 1852, and Luden's, created in 1879; in 1903 "Glyco-Heroin" was advertised as a "Respiratory Sedative." Concern over the risk of opioid dependence led to the development of alternative medications.

== Brands ==
- Anta
- Cēpacol
- Chloraseptic
- Fisherman's Friend
- Halls
- Jakemans
- Jinsangzi
- Läkerol
- Lockets
- Luden's
- Mynthon
- Negro
- Nin Jiom
- Pine Bros.
- Ricola
- Robitussin
- Smith Brothers
- Strepsils
- Sucrets
- Ülker
- Takabb Anti-Cough Pill
- Throzz
- Troketts
- Tunes
- Tyrozets (now discontinued)
- Vicks
- Strep-Drops
- Victory V
- Vigroids
- Woogie Euka Menthol
- Zubes (now discontinued)

== See also ==
- Mint (candy)
- Pastille
- Cough medicine
