= Takabb Anti-Cough Pill =

Chinese herbal throat lozenge

Hatakabb (Sim Tien Hor) Co., Ltd.
- The packaging of Takabb Anti-Cough Pill (herbal flavour), Hatakabb's primary product. The design features founder Shen Shuishi's portrait at the center and five centipedes.
- Native name

Chinese name
- Traditional Chinese: 沈天河（五蜈蚣標）有限公司
- Simplified Chinese: 沈天河（五蜈蚣标）有限公司

Thai name
- Thai: บริษัท ห้าตะขาบ (ซิมเทียนฮ้อ)
- Type: Private
- Industry: Pharmaceutical manufacturing
- Founder: Shen Shuishi
- Headquarters: 1 Soi 44, Rama II Road, Tha Kham, Bang Khun Thian district, Bangkok, Thailand
- Brands: Takabb Anti-Cough Pill
- Website: www.takabb.com/language/en

Takabb Anti-Cough Pill is a throat lozenge. It is known in Thai as Takabb Ha Tua (ตะขาบ 5 ตัว, RTGS: Takhap Ha Tua), which literally means "five centipedes". It is the primary product of Hatakabb (Sim Tien Hor) Co., Ltd. (Thai: บริษัท ห้าตะขาบ (ซิมเทียนฮ้อ); Chinese: 沈天河（五蜈蚣标）有限公司), a Thai company that manufactures Chinese herbal medications. The cough pill has a distinctive packaging design featuring the pill creator's portrait surrounded by five centipedes. Although the logo depicts centipedes, the pill has no centipedes in its ingredients. Nine Chinese herbs make up the pill's ingredients. The Takabb Anti-Cough Pill is sold in almost every ASEAN country, and is very popular among Chinese tourists, who commonly purchase large amounts when visiting Thailand and Hong Kong.

The pill's creator, Shen Shuishi, immigrated from China's Fujian province to Thailand in 1917. Using the Traditional Chinese medicine knowledge he had gained in his youth, Shen invented the anti-cough pill, which he began selling in 1935 to Thai pharmacies. After two decades of this, he in 1953 opened his own pharmacy, where he sold the pill and other Chinese medicines.

After Shen died, his oldest son, Nivat Simawara, became the head of the company. Simawara shut down the pharmacy in favor of establishing the company Hatakabb in 1973 to mass-produce the cough medicines for sale. Since the Takabb pill is largely purchased by older people, the family business's second and third generations of leadership focused on broadening the company's appeal to younger demographics. The pill is bitter and makes consumers' tongues black. In the mid-2000s, the company began offering new flavors—mint, lemongrass, and plum—to attract younger consumers. To market the company to youth, it signed a partnership with a clothing company in 2019 to feature its logo on street style apparel.

== History ==
Shen Shuishi (simplified Chinese: 沈水狮; traditional Chinese: 沈水獅; pinyin: shěn shuǐ shī; Pe̍h-ōe-jī: sím chúi sai), known in Thai based on the Teochew pronunciation as Jui-Sai Sae-Sim (จุ้ยไซ แซ่ซิ้ม, RTGS: Chuisai Sae-Sim), was born in 1898 in Fujian, China. (Note: For the Mandarin name Shen Shuishi and Chinese spelling 沈水狮; For the Thai name จุ้ยไซ แซ่ซิ้ม; For the romanized form Jui-Sai Sae-Sim) His ancestral home was Zhao'an County in Fujian. In his youth in Fujian, he acquired substantial expertise in Traditional Chinese medicine and Chinese herbology while assisting a doctor in compounding medicines. Escaping a war occurring in China, Shen moved in 1917 with his family to Bang Khla district in Thailand. To make a living, he worked as a gardener and did poultry farming until he had enough to funds to start a grocery store at the floating market in Bang Khla district. In 1935, Shen moved to the Bangkok neighborhood of Talat Noi. Continuing to do manual work by day, Shen spent evening hours and leisure time on making herbal medicines. He concocted a Chinese herbology formula that would alleviate coughs. Shen gave the medicine to his neighbors and family and found that it helped them. Seeking to provide for his family, Shen wanted to make more money through selling medication that he named "Sim Tien Hor anti-cough pill". He delivered the medications he created to pharmacies in Bangkok in the 1920s.

When the Second World War reached Thailand and the Japanese occupied Bangkok, Shen moved with his family to Phra Pradaeng district. He created the trademark "Five Centipedes" (Chinese: 五蜈蚣; Thai: ตะขาบ 5 ตัว) for the medicines and began selling the Takabb Anti-Cough Pill in Thailand. For over two decades, he sold his products to Thai pharmacies on visits where he lugged bags containing the medicine. He relocated to the Thonburi area of Bangkok in 1953 near the Sae Sim Shrine and established a pharmacy that sold Chinese medicines including those he produced. While Shen ran the company, the company had no employees. Suthep Simawara, Shen's second-eldest son, said rather than have employees, Shen's five wives and children made the medicine. Five Centipede-branded medications included balm and those to treat abdominal pain and asthma, but according to Manager Daily, the most well-known and successful was the throat lozenge product, the Takabb Anti-Cough Pill.

After Shen died, his oldest son, Nivat Simawara (Thai: นิวัต สิมะวรา), became the head of the company. Simawara shut down the pharmacy in favor of establishing the company Hatakabb (Thai: บริษัท ห้าตะขาบ, lit. 'Five Centipede Company') in 1973. The company's full name is Hatakabb (Sim Tien Hor). Sim Tien Hor (simplified Chinese: 沈天河药行有限公司; traditional Chinese: 沈天河藥行有限公司; Thai: ซิมเทียนฮ้อ) is included as part of the name in parentheses. Hatakabb was created to mass-produce the medicines for sale. Owing to growing sales of its products, the company established a factory in Bang Khun Thian district on Rama II Road. Hatakabb was run in 2007 by the second generation of the family: Suthep Simawara as board chair and Suthep and Sunthon Simawara as co-managing directors. By the mid-2000s, the company had started offering flavored lozenges: mint, lemongrass, and plum. The original pill makes the consumer's tongue black and is bitter, so the purpose of the flavored pills is to have the consumer experience a refreshing taste before the bitter taste comes in after the flavored coating has melted. The Manager Daily said that another change was revamping their products to have "chic design packaging in the form of a slim, colorful plastic box". The aim of the new flavors and new packaging was to broaden the customer base to teenagers and young adults as their previous customer base was primarily middle-aged and older adults. In the past, only pharmacies sold Hatakabb products. To help Hatakabb reach new customers, its products in the mid-2000s began being available for purchase in convenience stores, filling station shops, and supermarkets.

Four members of the family's third generation began assisting in running the business by the mid-2000s. The company hired members of the third generation of the family in leadership positions: Paiboon Simawara (son of Niwat Simawara) to be the international manager and Metha Simavara (Suthep Simavara's son) to become the factory manager. According to a 2014 interview with Metha Simavara, the company's revenue has grown annually by 12%–17%. Hatabb had 2014 revenue of ฿300 million (US$9,284,994), and circa 2018 revenue of ฿500 million (US$15,474,989). Of the 2018 revenue, roughly 70% was from exports. Of the 30% of the revenue from domestic purchases, 70% of that came from tourist purchases.

Hatakabb created the trading company called Hatakabb Trading (Thailand) Co. in 2015. Its charter was to import goods to sell to Thais. The two primary products the trading company sells are Porous Capsicum Chili Plaster, a type of pain relief patch, and the herbal ointment Yu Yee oil. After collaborating with BIOTEC on creating a spray that treats coughs, Hatakabb began selling the spray in 2020. A core goal of the third generation of leadership is to increase the international sales of the company products.

== Approvals ==
The Takabb Anti-Cough Pill is registered with the Thai Food and Drug Administration as a herbal product of the type "Chinese traditional drug". It received trademarks in 40 countries and secured drug registrations in 10 countries. The product has not received approval from China's National Medical Products Administration, which is responsible for drug supervision in the country, and as such the company cannot directly sell the product in China.

== Packaging design ==
TVBS said that Takabb Anti-Cough Pill has "unforgettable packaging" that is made to "steal the show". Shen's trademark photograph is featured at the center of the medicine's container, which also has artwork of five centipedes. The Hatakabb anti-cough pill is called takabb ha tua, which literally means "five centipedes". On the packaging, two centipedes flank Shen's portrait on the left and right, while three centipedes are on the left, right, and top of the outer area.

There are two reasons centipedes were chosen to be part of the anti-cough pill brand's logo. The first is that the creator, Shen Shuishi, was inspired by the numerous centipedes he saw in Phra Pradaeng district, which he had moved to after the start of the Second World War. He observed centipedes scurrying up his house's walls to flee a flood. The second is that the incident inspired Shen to remember first that traditional Chinese medicine has the saying "fight poison with poison" to remedy people's sicknesses and second that centipedes are poisonous.

The initial design featured two centipedes. Another company's product featured one centipede. Concerned that customers would mix up the two companies' product, Shen redesigned the packaging to have five centipedes placed around a circle. In Chinese numerology, the number five is believed to be a lucky number. Numerous counterfeit medications in Thailand feature centipedes on their logo, which misleads customers into thinking they are buying the Takabb Anti-Cough Pill.

== International sales ==
In the 2010s, the Takabb Anti-Cough Pill saw a large increase in sales among international customers, especially Chinese tourists. In 2019, 30 percent of its sales were from export markets, while of the remaining 70 percent in domestic sales, around 40 were from tourists visiting Thailand. Among the long-established herbal products in Thailand, East Asian visitors view the five centipedes brand as being among the most in vogue. The Takabb Anti-Cough Pill is sold in nearly every ASEAN country as well as in Hong Kong and Macau. It is sold in Brunei's shops, supermarkets, and pharmacies. Shops in European and North American countries—including Canada, France, and the United States—have purchased the cough pills owing to demand from Chinese immigrants.

The pill's popularity in China spread mostly by word-of-mouth. Chinese Internet users praised the cough pill as a "cough relief miracle medicine" and an "Internet celebrity miracle medicine", which has prompted it to become a "must-buy item" for tourists visiting Thailand and Hong Kong. it is used by numerous Chinese singers when they have sore throats including one singer in the singing competition show Singer.

== Marketing and partnerships ==
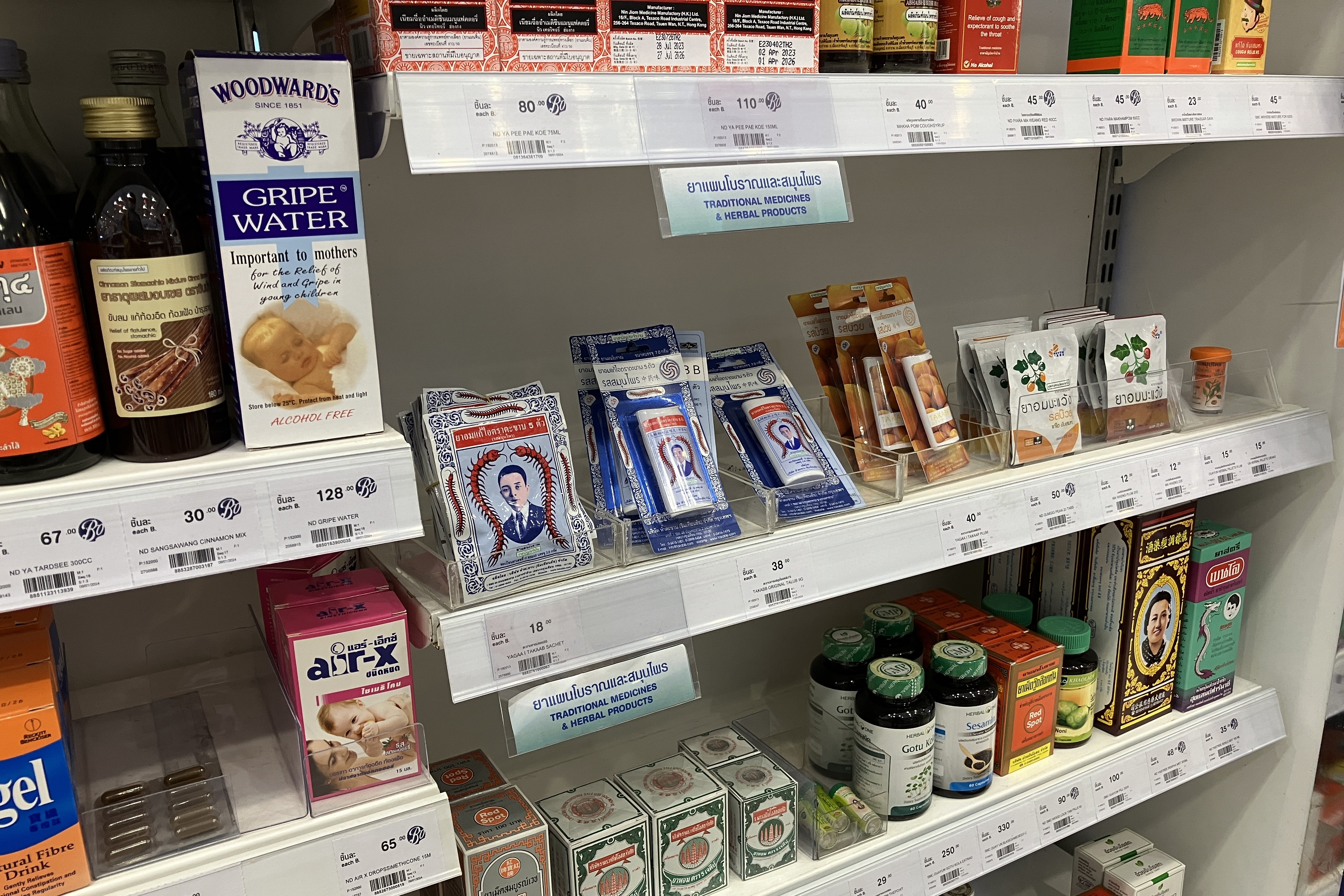
Takabb Anti-Cough Pills for sale on the traditional medicines and herbal products shelf in a Thai drugstore

Hatakabb has marketed itself through social media posts. To communicate its values, the company made a post featuring pictures containing employees' yearly medical examinations along with the statement, "We always stay healthy and believe in work-life balance." Another social media post spoofed the heroine Khun Yai Worranart (known as Granma Worranart) in the Thai TV series Tayard Asoon (which means "the heir of the demon"). To attack her foes, she discharges centipedes at them from her mouth. In one social media contest, winners get to holiday at a hotel by the sea for three days. Another contest the company ran: "Tag a friend who often gets a sore throat to win a cushion with Takabb logo."

In a partnership with the Thai apparel company Greyhound, Hatakabb in 2019 had its "signature" product packaging design imprinted on Greyhound products in a selection called "Takabb x Greyhound". Products sold included caps, Aloha shirts, T-shirts, and tote bags. An Aloha shirt containing Hatakabb's logo cost ฿2,000 (US$64). The apparel was sold in a Siam Center pop-up shop named Absolute Thai Souvenir. After the apparel company started selling the Hatakabb-branded products, all 100 were completely purchased in under an hour. According to Hatakabb's managing director Soonthon Simavara, Hatakabb continued to be focused on producing medicine. The partnership, he said, was an attempt to market the company to youth who among all their customers represented only a tiny sliver. Kreetha Simawara, the company's marketing manager, believed that perhaps owing to the centipede packaging design, the youth considered the "Five Centipedes" brand to be "scary" and "old-fashioned". He hoped that imprinting the centipede logo onto the stylish and street style Greyhound apparel would make the youth become not just less averse to but also interested in their product.

Hatakabb formed a one-year partnership with the beverage company Sappe (Thai: เซ็ปเป้) to create the "Sappe X Takabb" drink. The beverage contained Takabb's "herbal material". They began selling the drink in June 2021.

== Ingredients ==
In its ingredients, the Takabb Anti-Cough Pill has nine Chinese herbs. Each pill contains 581.2 mg of nutgall tree, 19.2 mg of bitter apricot kernels, 19.2 mg of angular Solomon's seal, 12.8 mg of lotus seeds, 12.8 mg of squirrel's-foot fern, 12.8 mg of Chinese liquorice, 12.8 mg of Chinese cinnamon, 12.8 mg of fountainplant, and 6.4 mg of Mentha haplocalyx.

The Takabb Anti-Cough Pill is halal. It does not contain sugar. Despite having centipedes on its packaging, the cough pill does not have centipedes in its ingredients.

== Bibliography ==
- Chokpitakkul, Nitcha; Anantachart, Saravudh (January–April 2020). "Small but Smart: Qualitative Content Analysis of Successful Thai Small and Medium Enterprises' Brand Communication on Social Media". นิเทศศาสตร์ปริทัศน์ [Journal of Communication Arts]. 28 (1). Chulalongkorn University. ISSN 0857-085X. Archived from the original on 2020-07-31.
