= Pine Bros. =

US manufacturer of throat lozenges

Pine Bros. is a US manufacturer of throat drops.

John Herman Pine and George William Pine were Philadelphia confectioner brothers. They emigrated from Germany in the 1860s with their parents, Frederick Pine and Margaretta Knopple Pine. In 1870 they formed Pine Brothers and opened a confectionery shop, selling Pine Brothers Glycerine Tablets.

The Pine family continued to run the Pine Bros. Soft Throat Drops business until the 1930s. The business has been sold several times since then. It was recently revived in 2012 by Victoria Knight-McDowell, creator of dietary supplement Airborne. The company continues to make softish cough drops.
