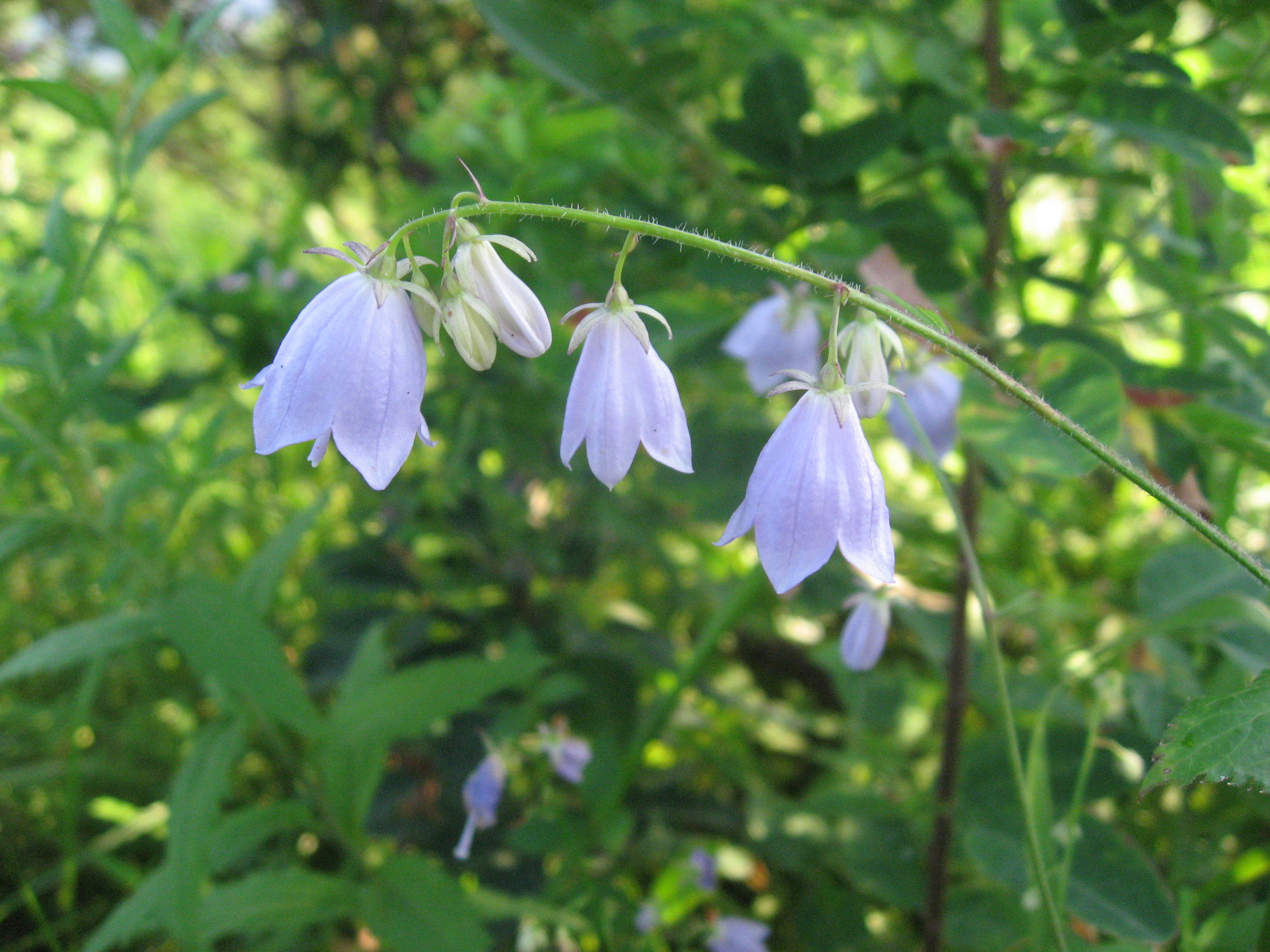

Scientific classification
- Kingdom: Plantae
- Clade: Tracheophytes
- Clade: Angiosperms
- Clade: Eudicots
- Clade: Asterids
- Order: Asterales
- Family: Campanulaceae
- Genus: Adenophora
- Species: A. divaricata

Binomial name
- Adenophora divaricata Franch. & Sav. (1878)

= Adenophora divaricata =

Species of plant

Adenophora divaricata, also known as spreading-branch ladybell, is a flowering perennial plant of the genus Adenophora, in the Bellflower family. It is distributed in East Asia, including China, Japan, Korea, and the Russian Far East.

== Description ==
Adenophora divaricata has blue or light purple bell-shaped flowers. It grows in forests, shrublands, and on grassy slopes.
