= Anilazine =

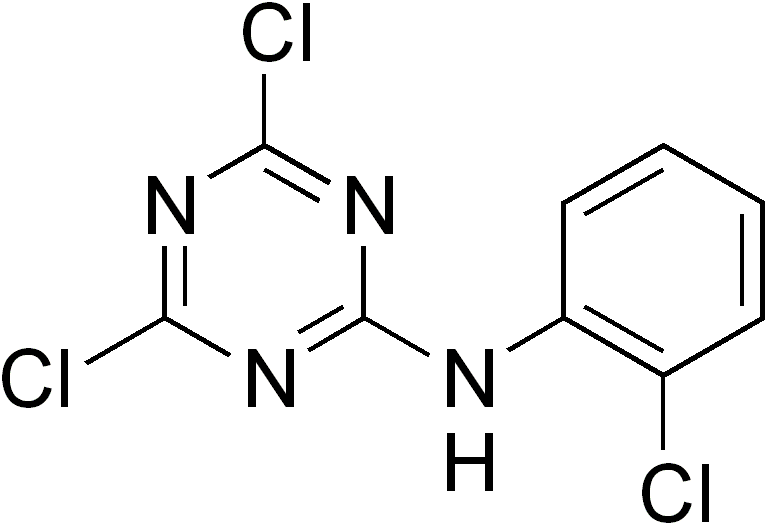

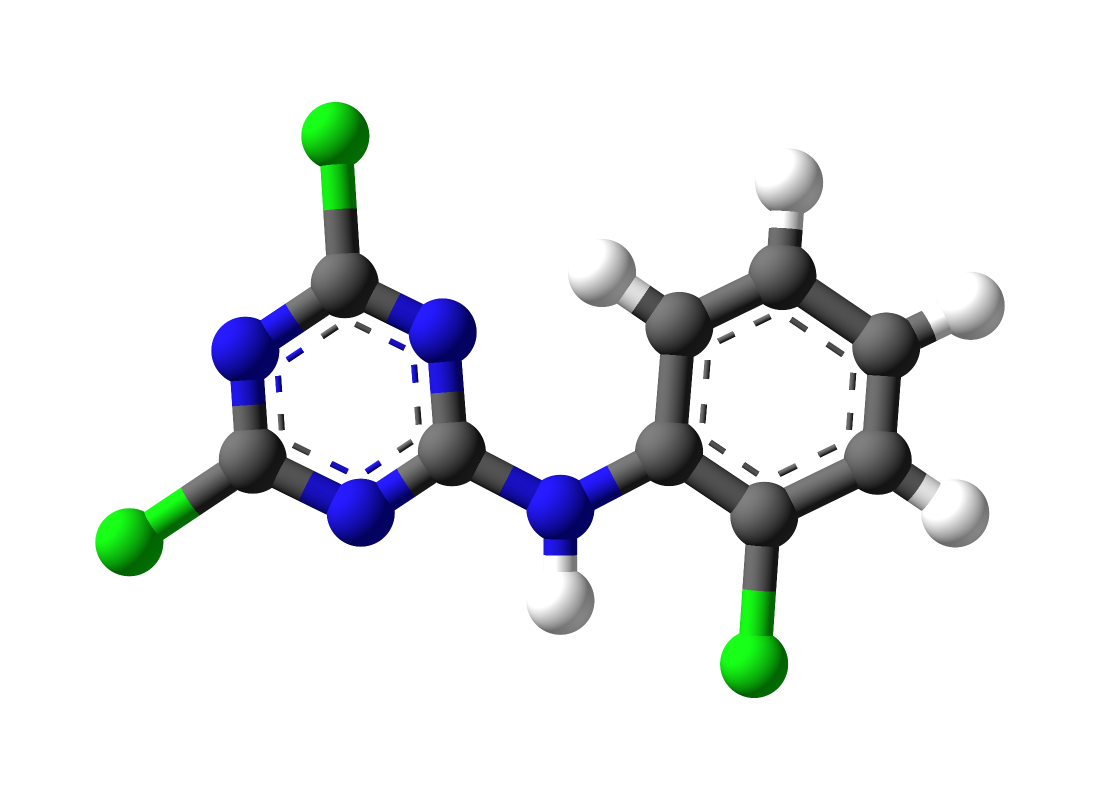

Names
- Preferred IUPAC name 4,6-Dichloro-N-(2-chlorophenyl)-1,3,5-triazin-2-amine
- Other names Anilazine (Dyrene); dyrene

Identifiers
CAS Number	101-05-3
3D model (JSmol)	Interactive image
ChEMBL	ChEMBL464135
ChemSpider	7260
ECHA InfoCard	100.002.646
EC Number	202-910-5
KEGG	C18935
PubChem CID	7541
RTECS number	XY7175000
UNII	C6E8Y03ZJN
UN number	3077, 2588
CompTox Dashboard (EPA)	DTXSID9020089
- InChI: InChI=1S/C9H5Cl3N4/c10-5-3-1-2-4-6(5)13-9-15-7(11)14-8(12)16-9/h1-4H,(H,13,14,15,16) Key: IMHBYKMAHXWHRP-UHFFFAOYSA-N; InChI=1/C9H5Cl3N4/c10-5-3-1-2-4-6(5)13-9-15-7(11)14-8(12)16-9/h1-4H,(H,13,14,15,16) Key: IMHBYKMAHXWHRP-UHFFFAOYAQ
- SMILES: Clc1nc(nc(Cl)n1)Nc2ccccc2Cl

Properties
Chemical formula	C_{9}H_{5}Cl_{3}N_{4}
Molar mass	275.52 g·mol^{−1}
Appearance	White to light brown crystals or powder
Density	1.611 g/cm^{3}
Melting point	159 °C (318 °F; 432 K)
Boiling point	365 °C (689 °F; 638 K)
Solubility in water	0.0008 g/100mL
Solubility	hexane: .017 g/100 mL methylene chloride: 9 g/100 mL acetone: 10 g/100 mL chlorobenzene: 6 g/100 mL toluene: 5 g/100 mL xylene: 4 g/100 mL
Vapor pressure	2.48×10^{−5} mmHg

Hazards
- GHS labelling
Pictograms	(GHS05: Corrosive) (GHS07: Exclamation mark) (GHS09: Environmental hazard)
Signal word	Danger
Hazard statements	H315, H318, H319, H410
Precautionary statements	P264, P273, P280, P302+P352, P305+P351+P338, P310, P321, P332+P313, P337+P313, P362, P391, P501
Flash point	232.2 °C (450.0 °F; 505.3 K)
- Lethal dose or concentration (LD, LC)
LD_{50} (median dose)	>5,000 mg/kg
- Except where otherwise noted, data are given for materials in their standard state (at 25 °C [77 °F], 100 kPa). verify (what is ?) Infobox references

Anilazine (ǎ-nǐl-a-zēn) is an organic compound with the chemical formula C_{9}H_{5}Cl_{3}N_{4}. It is a pesticide used on crops. It comes under the category of triazine fungicides. It is used for controlling fungus diseases which attack lawns and turf, cereals, coffee, and a wide variety of vegetables and other crops. It is also used for the control of potato and tomato leafspots.

== Toxicity ==
Oral administration to rats and cats, the most common signs of toxicity were diarrhea and vomiting respectively After dermal administration to rabbits mild skin irritation manifested as edema and erythema was observed. Anilazine was more toxic by intraperitoneal injection than by other routes of administration.

== Medical use ==
In 1955, Bergsmann studied dairin as a tuberculocide.
