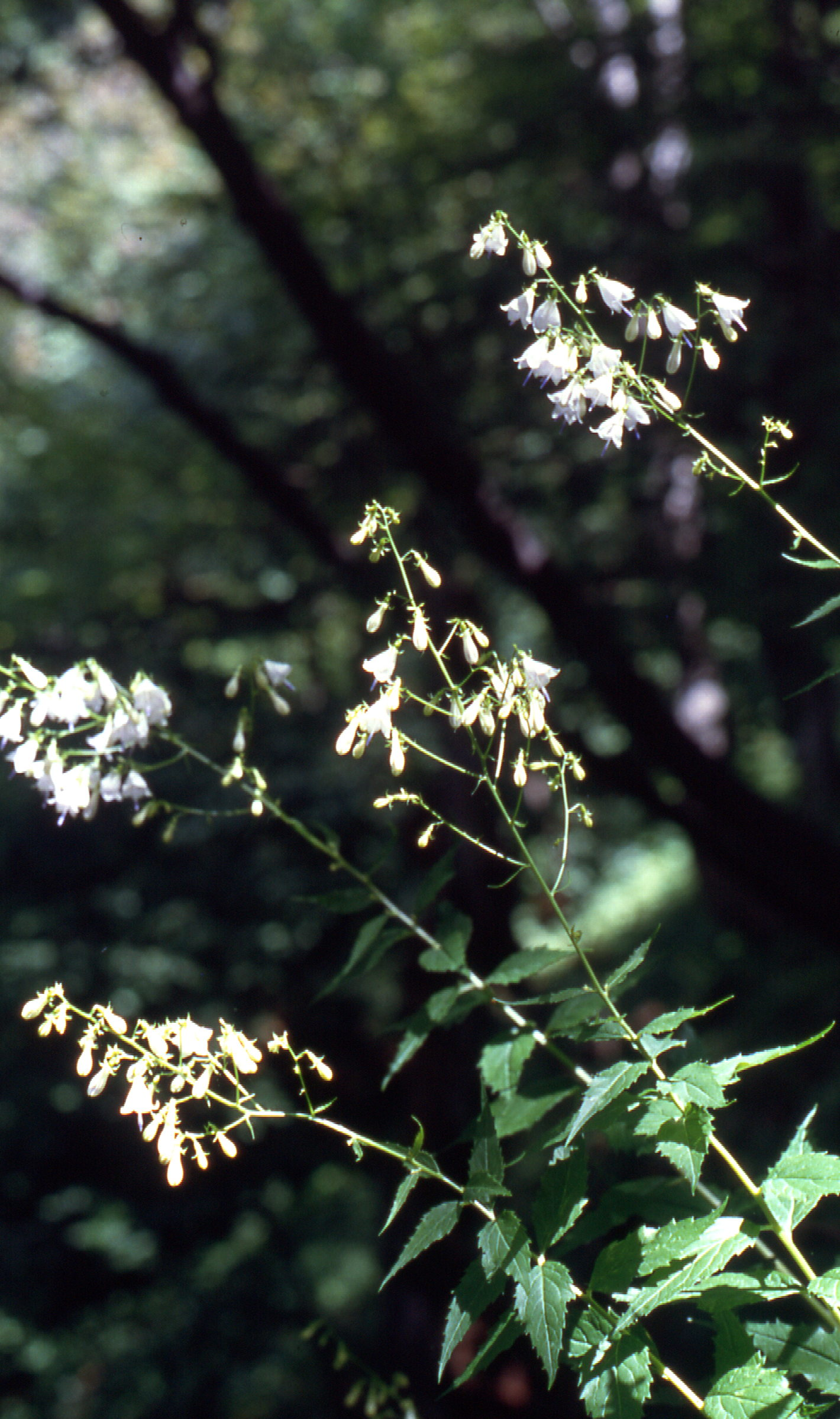

Scientific classification
- Kingdom: Plantae
- Clade: Tracheophytes
- Clade: Angiosperms
- Clade: Eudicots
- Clade: Asterids
- Order: Asterales
- Family: Campanulaceae
- Genus: Adenophora
- Species: A. liliifolia

Binomial name
- Adenophora liliifolia (L.) A.DC.

= Adenophora liliifolia =

Species of flowering plant

Adenophora liliifolia is a species of plants belonging to the family Campanulaceae.

It is native to Europe and Northern America.

Synonyms:

- Adenophora lilifolia (L.) Ledeb. ex A.DC.
