= Pentyl group =

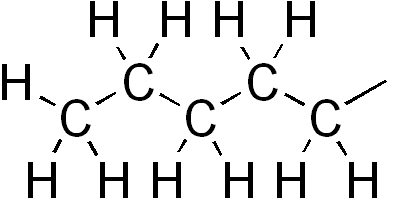
- Skeletal formula of pentyl with all explicit hydrogens added

Identifiers
CAS Number	2672-01-7
3D model (JSmol)	Interactive image
ChemSpider	109782
PubChem CID	123167
- InChI: InChI=1S/C5H11/c1-3-5-4-2/h1,3-5H2,2H3 Key: BFKVXNPJXXJUGQ-UHFFFAOYSA-N
- SMILES: [CH2]CCCC

Properties
Chemical formula	−C_{5}H_{11}
Molar mass	71.143 g·mol^{−1}
- Except where otherwise noted, data are given for materials in their standard state (at 25 °C [77 °F], 100 kPa). Infobox references

Pentyl is a five-carbon alkyl group or substituent with chemical formula −C_{5}H_{11}. It is the substituent form of the alkane pentane.

In older literature, the common non-systematic name amyl was often used for the pentyl group. Conversely, the name pentyl was used for several five-carbon branched alkyl groups, distinguished by various prefixes. The nomenclature has now reversed, with "amyl" being more often used to refer to the terminally branched group also called isopentyl, as in amobarbital.

A cyclopentyl group is a ring with the formula −C_{5}H_{9}.

The name is also used for the pentyl radical, a pentyl group as an isolated molecule. This free radical is only observed in extreme conditions. Its formula is often written "C_{5}H_{11}•" or "• C_{5}H_{11}" to indicate that it has one unsatisfied valence bond. Radicals like pentyl are reactive, they react with neighboring atoms or molecules (like oxygen, water, etc.)

== Older "pentyl" groups ==
The following names are still used sometimes:

Name	Structure	SMILES	IUPAC status	IUPAC recomm.	Examples
n-pentyl, amyl	H_{3}C−(CH_{2})_{4}−	CCCCC-		pentyl	
isopentyl, amyl, isoamyl	(H_{3}C−)_{2}CH−(CH_{2})_{2}−	CC(C)CC-	No longer recommended	3-methylbutyl	
active pentyl	H_{3}C−CH_{2}−(H_{3}C−)CH−CH_{2}−	CCC(C)C-		2-methylbutyl	
sec-pentyl	H_{3}C−(CH_{2})_{2}−(H_{3}C−)CH−	CCCC(C)-		pentan-2-yl(or (1-methylbutyl))	
neopentyl	(H_{3}C−)_{3}C−CH_{2}−	CC(C)(C)C-	No longer recommended	2,2-dimethylpropyl	
sec-isopentyl	(H_{3}C−)_{2}CH−(H_{3}C−)CH−	CC(C)C(C)-		3-methylbutan-2-yl (or 1,2-dimethylpropyl)	
tert-pentyl	H_{3}C−CH_{2}−(H_{3}C−)_{2}C−	CCC(C)(C)-	No longer recommended	2-methylbutan-2-yl (aka 1,1-dimethylpropyl)	
3-pentyl	(H_{3}C−CH_{2}−)_{2}CH−	CCC(CC)-		pentan-3-yl (also known as 1-ethylpropyl)	

== Pentyl radical ==
The free radical pentyl was studied by J. Pacansky and A. Gutierrez in 1983. The radical was obtained by exposing bishexanoyl peroxide trapped in frozen argon to ultraviolet light, that caused its decomposition into two carbon dioxide (CO_{2}) molecules and two pentyl radicals.

== Examples ==
- Pentanol
- Pentyl pentanoate
- Amylamine
- Amyl acetate
- Amyl alcohol
- Amylmetacresol
- Isoamyl acetate
- Isoamyl alcohol
