= Strepsils =

Brand of throat remedies

- Strepsils brand logo
- Product type: Throat lozenge
- Current owner: Reckitt Benckiser
- Country: International
- Introduced: 1950; 76 years ago
- Markets: Worldwide
- Previous owners: Boots Healthcare
- Website: www.strepsils.co.uk

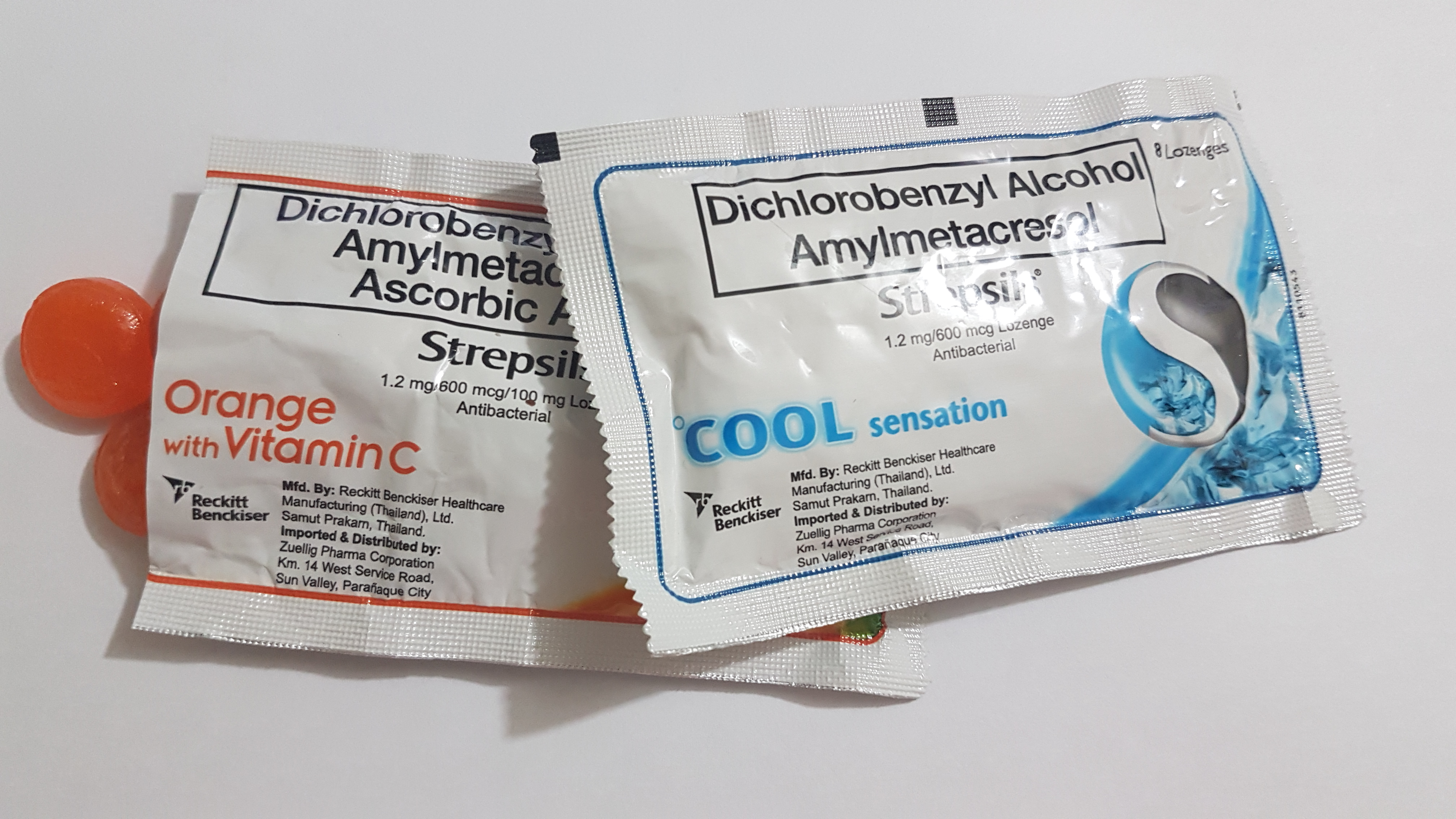
Strepsils, as distributed by Zuellig Pharma in the Philippines. Note former logo of Reckitt.

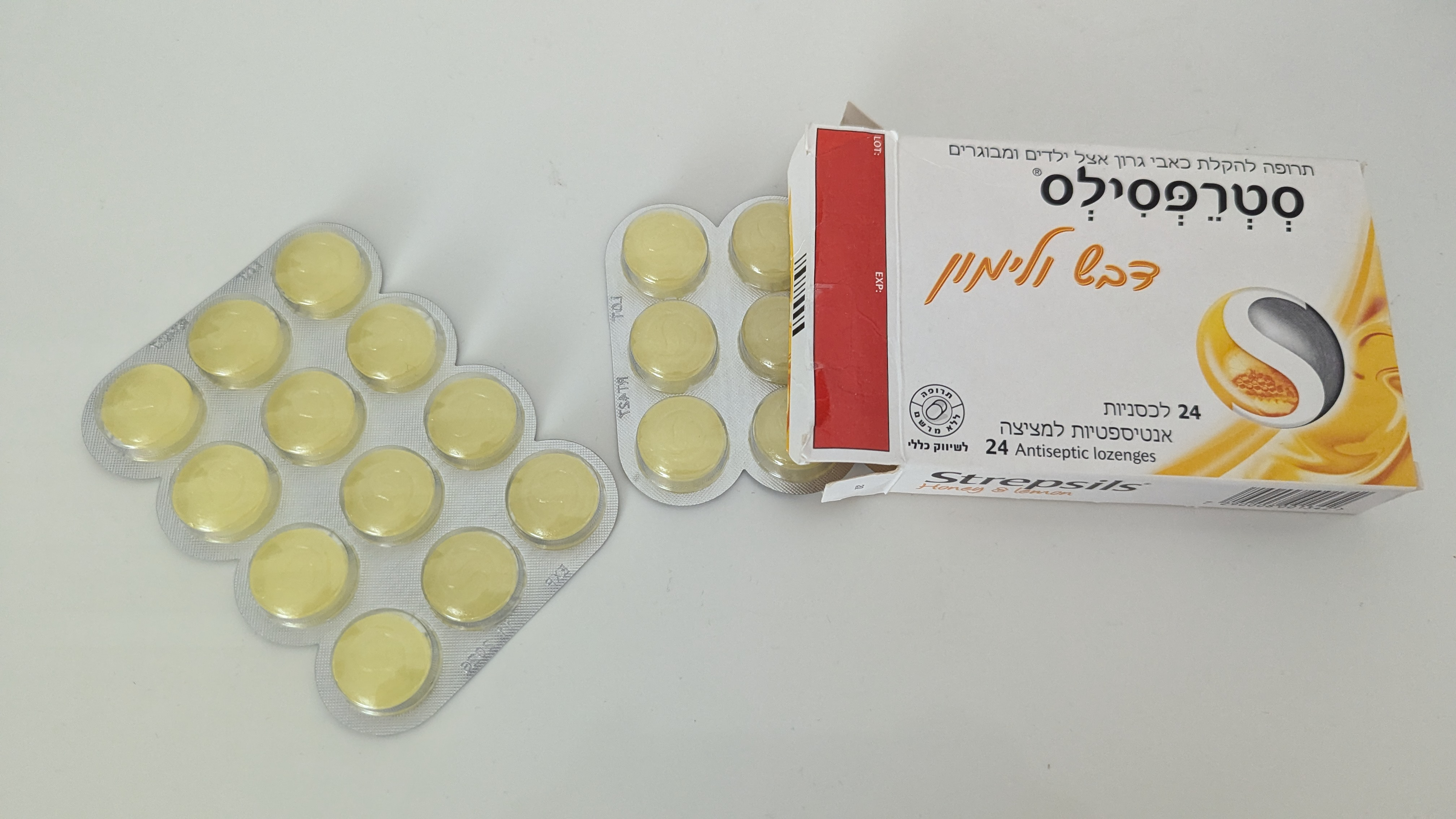
Strepsils package that is commonly sold in Israel.

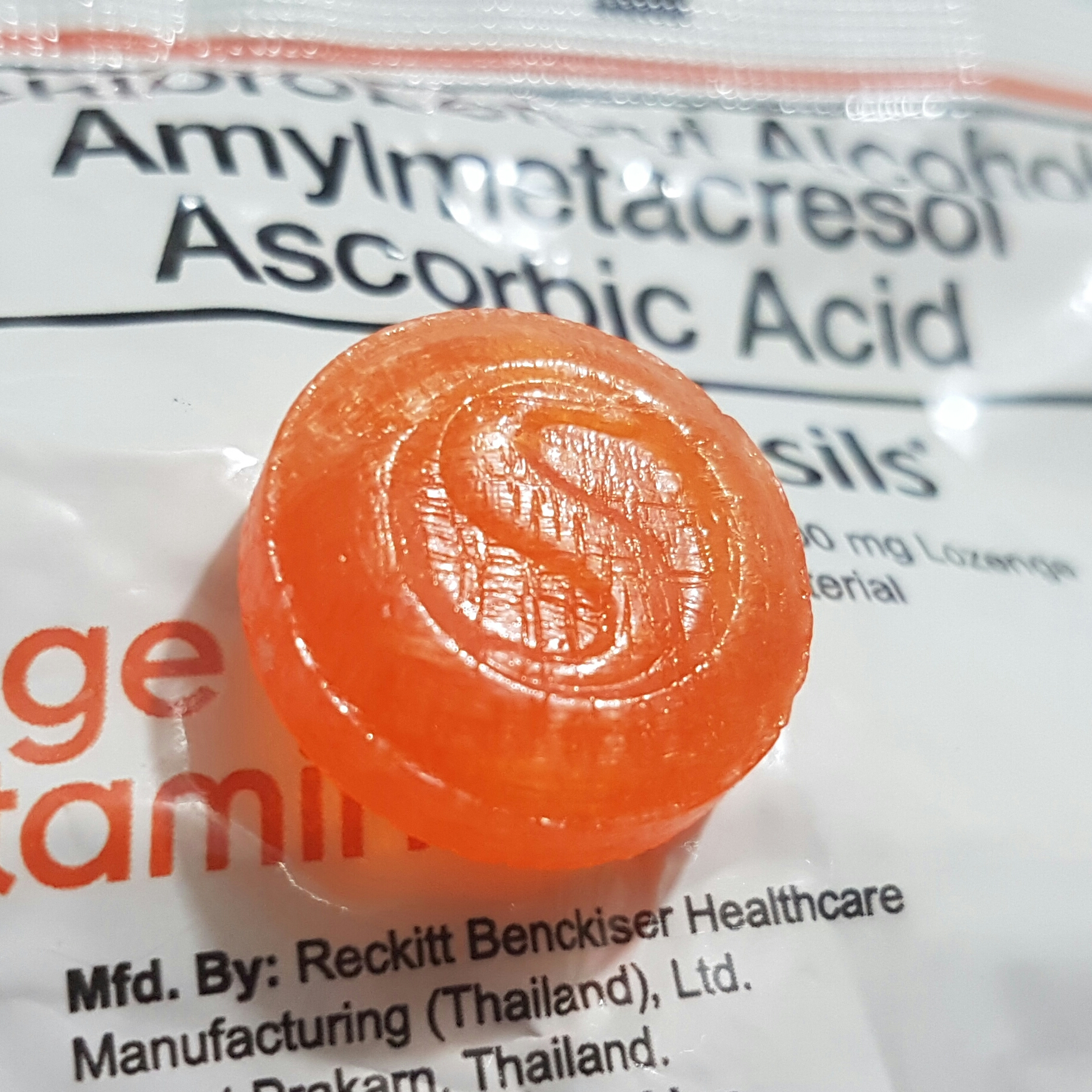
A single orange Strepsils lozenge on top of a package of same flavored lozenges (circa 2017).

Strepsils is a brand of throat lozenges manufactured by British company Reckitt Benckiser. Strepsils throat lozenges are used to relieve discomfort caused by mouth and throat infections.

== Ingredients ==
The primary active ingredients are dichlorobenzyl alcohol and amylmetacresol, with some formulations containing ascorbic acid (vitamin C). Inactive ingredients include menthol, tartaric acid, and propylene glycol.

Strepsils Extra rather contains Hexylresorcinol.

== History ==
Strepsils was originally introduced in 1950 by Boots Healthcare as a mouthwash. Strepsils throat lozenges were introduced in 1958. Strepsils was one of the Boots Healthcare brands acquired by Reckitt Benckiser in 2006.

Strepsils have been in production since 1958 and contain two active ingredients, namely: amylmetacresol and 2,4-dichlorobenzyl alcohol. These ingredients are mild antiseptics that can kill bacteria associated with mouth and throat infections. However, as indicated in the package, research has not demonstrated that the presence of an antibacterial agent reduces the duration or severity of an infection. Extra Strepsils contains hexylresorcinol as an active ingredient and strepsils sore throat and nose covered contains menthol 8 mg. Reckitt Benckiser also produces a higher-resistance pill that used to be marketed under the Strepsils Intensive label, but is now marketed under the Strepfen brand, which contains the active ingredient flurbiprofen 8.75 mg.

In Australia, Argentina and Hungary, 'Strepsils Plus' are available, which contain lidocaine, as well as the antiseptic agents present in original Strepsils. In France and Spain they are also available with lidocaine, marketed as 'Strepsils Lidocaine'.

The name of Strepsil comes from the Streptococcus bacterium that causes certain types of sore throat.

- Strepsils are sold in Italy under the Benagol brand.
- In Germany they are sold as Dobendan and Dobensana brand, and from 2009 to 2013 were sold as Dobendan Strepsils.
- In Norway they are sold without active ingredients under the Repsil brand.
- In North America, they are sold under the Cēpacol brand.

== Dose ==
The recommended dose is a tablet every 2–3 hours for adults.

Vitamin C is added for Strepsils Vitamin C-100. Each Strepsils Vitamin C-100 pill contains 1.2 mg of 2,4-dichlorobenzyl alcohol, amylmetacresol 0.6 mg and 100 mg of vitamin C.
