= Mucoprotective =

Mucoprotective agents are pharmaceutical or herbal medicines that protect mucous membrane tissues. They include such things as demulcents.
