= Demulcent =

Agent forming a soothing film over irritated mucous membranes

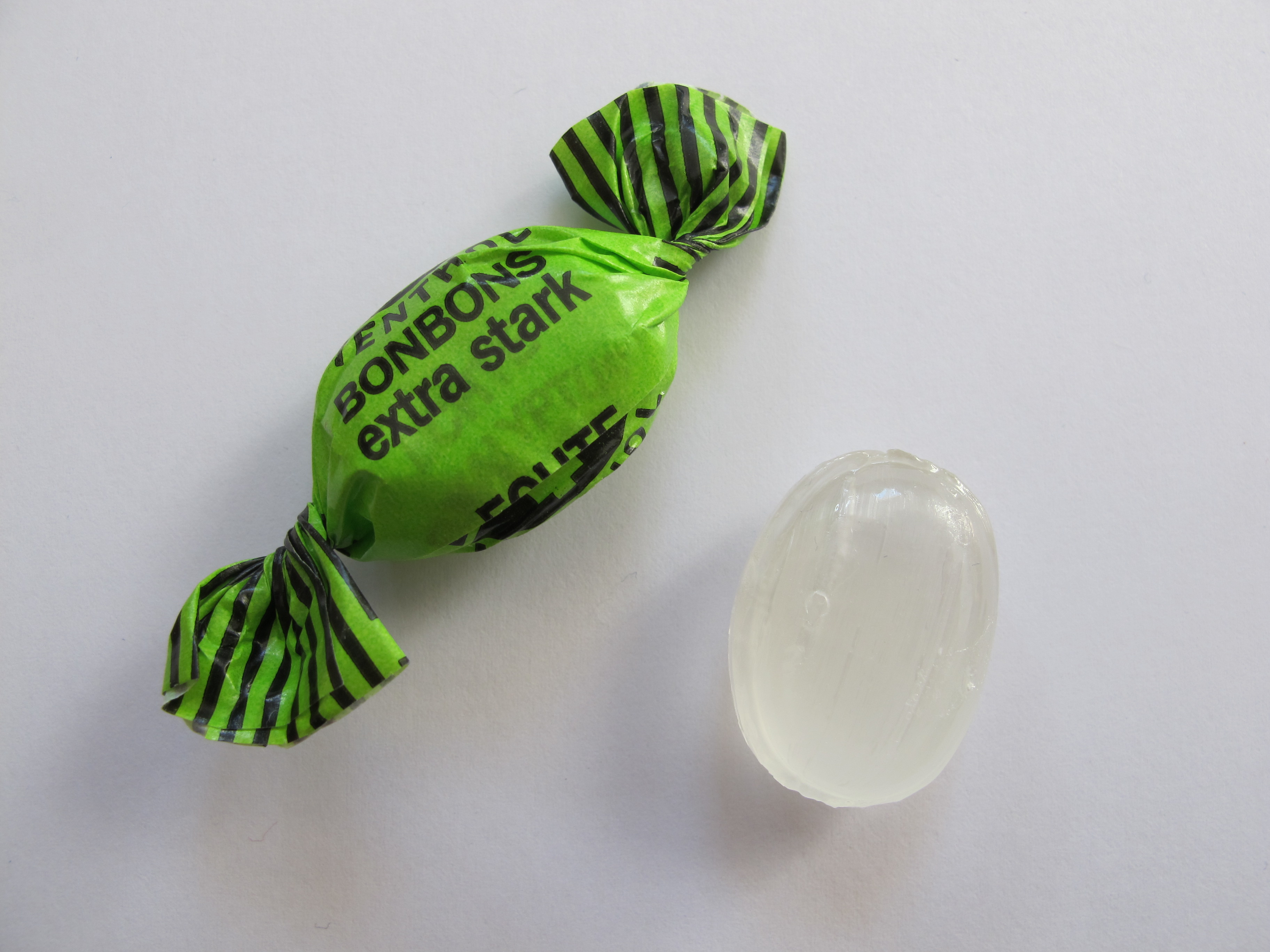
A demulcent cough drop

A demulcent (derived from the Latin: demulcere "caress"), sometimes called a mucoprotective agent, is a mucilaginous or oleaginous preparation that forms a soothing protective film over a mucous membrane, relieving minor pain and inflammation of the membrane. However, they generally help for less than 30 minutes.

Demulcents are sometimes referred to as mucoprotective agents. Demulcents such as pectin, glycerin, honey, and syrup are common ingredients in cough mixtures and cough drops.

== Examples ==
Natural demulcents include slippery elm, pectin, licorice-root and marsh-mallow (Althaea officinalis).

Synthetic demulcents include methylcellulose, propylene glycol, and glycerin.
