= Tuberculocide =

A tuberculocide is a substance or a process which disables or destroys the bacterium which causes tuberculosis, Mycobacterium tuberculosis.

== History ==
In 1955, Bergsmann studied dairin as a tuberculocide.

In 1976, Sachse studied peracetic acid as a tuberculocide.

In 1998, Wang and Ding studied diterpenoids from the roots of Euphorbia ebracteolata (one of the Euphorbia genus) as a tuberculocide.

In 2010, Zhang et al. reported that Euphorbia fischeriana had been used especially in Asia as a tuberculocide.

In 2011, Nde et al. studied three oxidative disinfectants as tuberculocides.
