= Amylmetacresol =

Chemical compound

Clinical data
- AHFS/Drugs.com: International Drug Names
- Routes of administration: By mouth (throat lozenges)
- ATC code: None

Legal status
- Legal status: In general: Over-the-counter (OTC)

Pharmacokinetic data
- Metabolism: Oxidation, glucuronidation
- Excretion: Via kidneys

Identifiers
- IUPAC name: 5-Methyl-2-pentylphenol
- CAS Number: 1300-94-3
- PubChem CID: 14759
- DrugBank: DB13908
- ChemSpider: 14076
- UNII: 05W904P57F
- ChEMBL: ChEMBL1512677
- CompTox Dashboard (EPA): DTXSID8046791
- ECHA InfoCard: 100.013.722

Chemical and physical data
- Formula: C_{12}H_{18}O
- Molar mass: 178.275 g·mol^{−1}
- 3D model (JSmol): Interactive image
- Melting point: 24 °C (75 °F)
- SMILES: CCCCCC1=C(C=C(C=C1)C)O
- InChI: InChI=1S/C12H18O/c1-3-4-5-6-11-8-7-10(2)9-12(11)13/h7-9,13H,3-6H2,1-2H3; Key:CKGWFZQGEQJZIL-UHFFFAOYSA-N

Amylmetacresol (AMC) is an antiseptic used to treat infections of the mouth and throat. It is used as an active pharmaceutical ingredient in Strepsils, Cēpacol, Gorpils, Cofsils and Lorsept throat lozenges, typically in combination with dichlorobenzyl alcohol, another antiseptic.

== Medical uses ==
The lozenges are used to treat sore throat and minor mouth and throat infections including pharyngitis and gingivitis.

A 2017 meta-analysis found that the combination of AMC with dichlorobenzyl alcohol has a modest advantage over un-medicated lozenges regarding pain relief.

== Contraindications ==
No contraindications are known apart from hypersensitivity to the substance.

== Adverse effects ==
Amylmetacresol sometimes causes soreness of the tongue. Hypersensitivity reactions are very rare and show symptoms such as nausea or dyspepsia, although it is not entirely clear which side effects are caused by AMC and which by dichlorobenzyl alcohol or other ingredients of the lozenges.

AMC has a low toxicity with an LD_{50} of 1500 mg/kg body weight (in rats).

== Overdose ==
No cases of overdosing have been reported. It is not expected to cause symptoms other than gastrointestinal discomfort.

== Interactions ==
No interactions with other drugs are known.

== Pharmacology ==
=== Mechanism of action ===
Amylmetacresol is an antibacterial and antiviral substance. It also blocks sodium channels in a manner similar to local anaesthetics. It has a Rideal-Walker coefficient of 250.

=== Pharmacokinetics ===
The substance is rapidly absorbed. It is oxidised to a carboxylic acid, glucuronidated, and quickly eliminated via the kidneys.

== Chemistry ==
AMC is a derivative of m-cresol, with a pentyl group attached to the sixth carbon atom. The pure substance melts at 24 °C (75 °F), and boils between 137 and 139 °C (279 and 282 °F) at a pressure of 6.7 kilopascals (50 mmHg). It is soluble in water, ethanol, acetone, diethyl ether, and oil.
