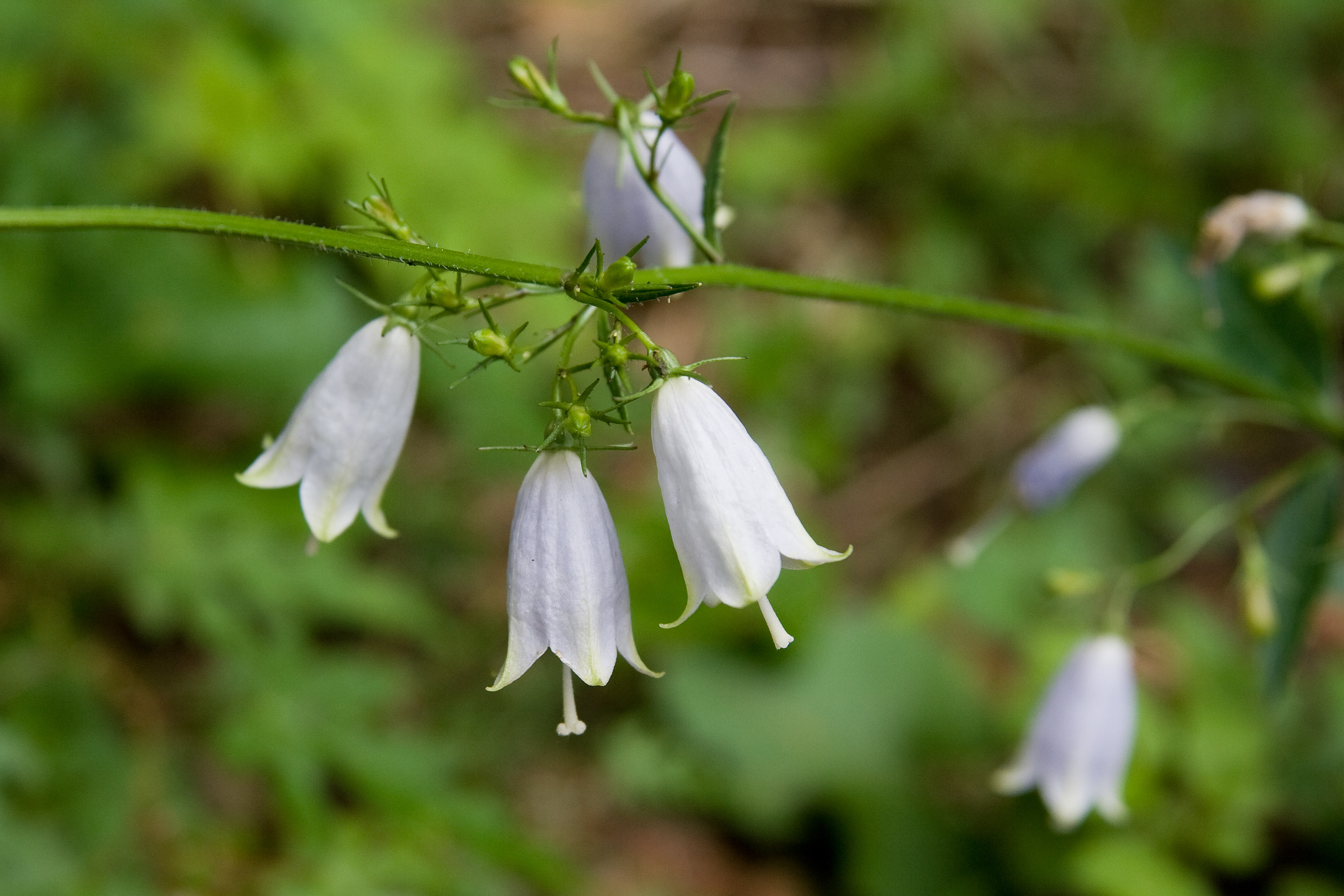

Scientific classification
- Kingdom: Plantae
- Clade: Tracheophytes
- Clade: Angiosperms
- Clade: Eudicots
- Clade: Asterids
- Order: Asterales
- Family: Campanulaceae
- Genus: Adenophora
- Species: A. triphylla

Binomial name
- Adenophora triphylla (Thunb.) A.DC.

Synonyms
- Adenophora tetraphylla (Thunb.) Fisch. ex B.D.Jacks.; A. verticillata Fisch.; A. verticillata var. angustifolia Regel; A. verticillata var. princeps Korsh.; Campanula tetraphylla Thunb.; C. triphylla Thunb. (basionym)

= Adenophora triphylla =

Species of flowering plant

Adenophora triphylla, also known as Japanese lady bell, is one of the 62 species of Adenophora. It is a flowering plant in the family Campanulaceae that is distributed mainly over the Korean Peninsula, Japan, and China.

== Ecology ==
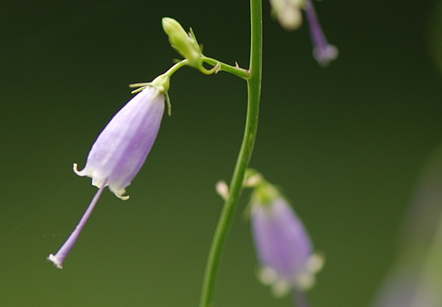
Flowers of Adenophora triphylla

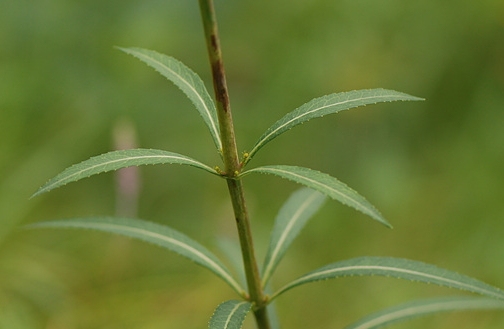
Stem and leaves of Adenophora triphylla

Adenophora triphylla is an erect, perennial herb growing to 100 centimetres (39 in) in height. It has a white and thickened taproot, shaped like a carrot, 7–16 centimetres (2.8–6.3 in) by 1.5–1.8 centimetres (0.59–0.71 in) in diameter. Stems are white pilose with alternately arranged leaves. It has oval, almost round, serrated leaves growing to 10 centimetres (3.9 in) that are white, sharply pointed, and pilose. A. triphylla flowers are about 13–22 millimetres (0.51–0.87 in) long and have both male and female organs (hermaphrodite), each having 5 stamens and a pistil (the long head of the pistil overhangs the flower). Flowers are pollinated by insects. Seeds are yellow-brown colored and oblong slightly compressed, 1–1.5 millimetres (0.039–0.059 in).

- Habitat: Grassy areas in lowlands and mountains.
- Suitable for: Grassy places in lowland and mountain with loamy soils.
- Distribution: Korea, Japan, China, Laos, Russia (Far East, Eastern Siberia), Vietnam.

== Cultivation details ==
Adenophora triphylla grows well in a warm and sunny or slightly shaded niche, but cannot grow in full shade; A. triphylla needs alkaline soil that is slightly moisturized, or peaty soil. Plants are hardy to about −20 °C (−4 °F). Slugs have been known to destroy its young growth or even mature plants.

== Propagation ==
Adenophora triphylla grows wild in mountains and meadows, but is also cultivated. The seed can be sown in spring and germinates in 1–3 months. At that time, it needs a temperature of about 10 °C (50 °F). It can be planted out into a permanent positions while young.

== Chemical constituents ==
Adenophora triphylla roots contain chemical compounds that are luteolin, butanol, chloroform, ethyl acetate, hexane, saponins and triterpenes.

== Cooking ==
The dried roots of Adenophora triphylla are eaten roasted, stir-fried, or pickled and are also used as seasoning in various Korean dishes.

== Traditional medicine ==
In Korea, A. triphylla is traditionally used for sputum, cough, bronchial catarrh and to fight obesity, cancer, and inflammation. It is believed to have antifungal, expectorant, and cardiotonic effects. In addition, the water extracts of Adenophora triphylla rejuvenate estrogen in postmenopausal women.
