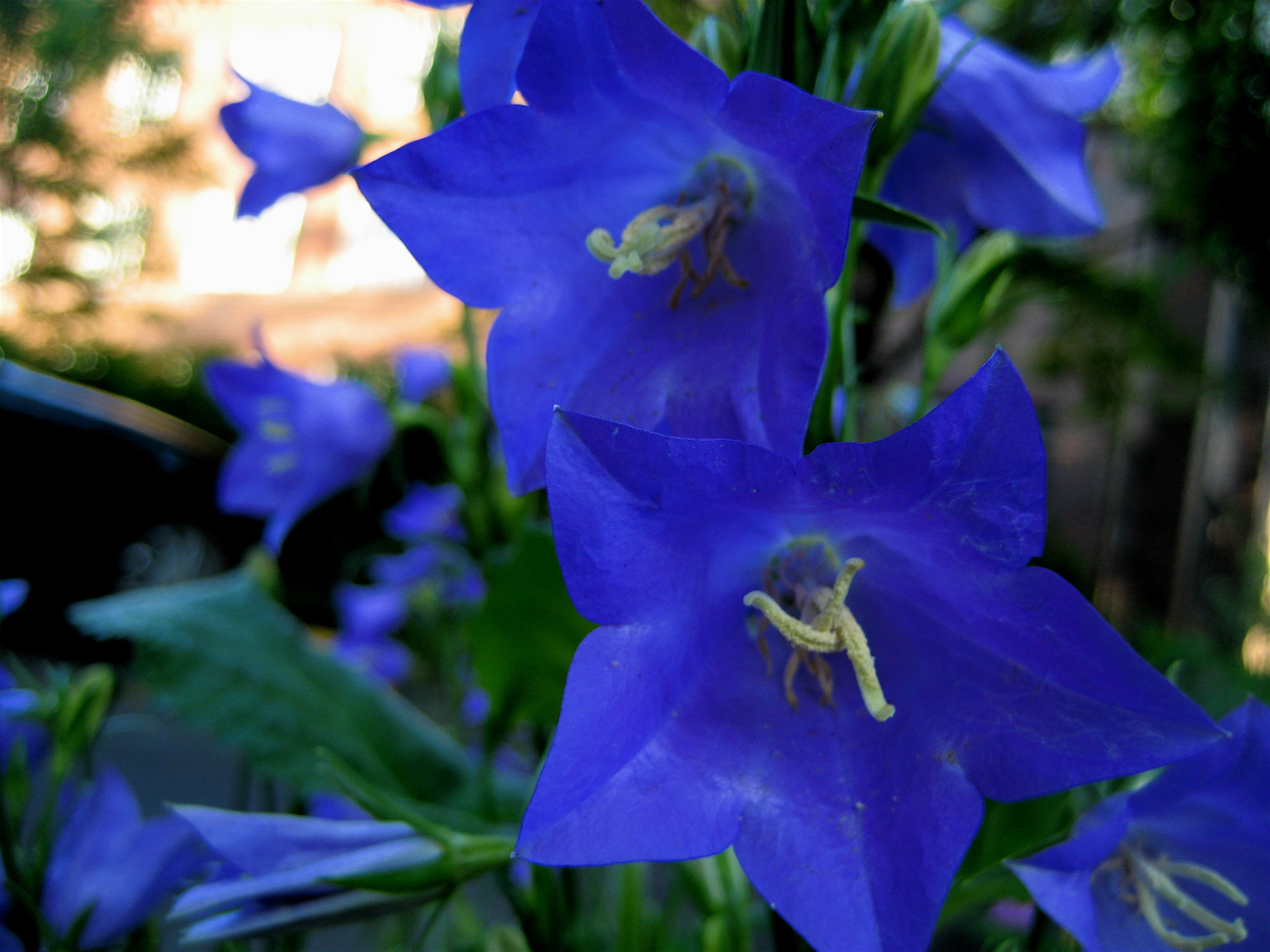
- Adenophora sp.

Scientific classification
- Kingdom: Plantae
- Clade: Tracheophytes
- Clade: Angiosperms
- Clade: Eudicots
- Clade: Asterids
- Order: Asterales
- Family: Campanulaceae
- Subfamily: Campanuloideae
- Genus: Adenophora; Fisch. (1823)

Synonyms
- Floerkea Spreng. (1818), illegitimate homonym, not Willd. 1801 nor Raf. 1808

= Adenophora =

Ladybells

Genus of flowering plants

Adenophora is a genus of flowering plants in the family Campanulaceae, the bellflowers. Plants of this genus are known commonly as ladybells. Most of the species in the genus are native to eastern Asia, with a few in Europe. Many are endemic to either China or Siberia.

== Description ==
These plants are perennial herbs, often with thick, fleshy roots. The stem usually grows erect from a caudex. There are usually several basal leaves borne on long petioles. The leaves on the stem are alternately arranged in most species. Flowers are solitary or borne in cymes. The corolla of the flower is bell-shaped, funnel-shaped, or tubular, with five lobes. The corollas of most species are blue. There is a characteristic nectar disc at the base of the stamens.

== Species ==
There are 68 species currently accepted as Adenophora. These are:

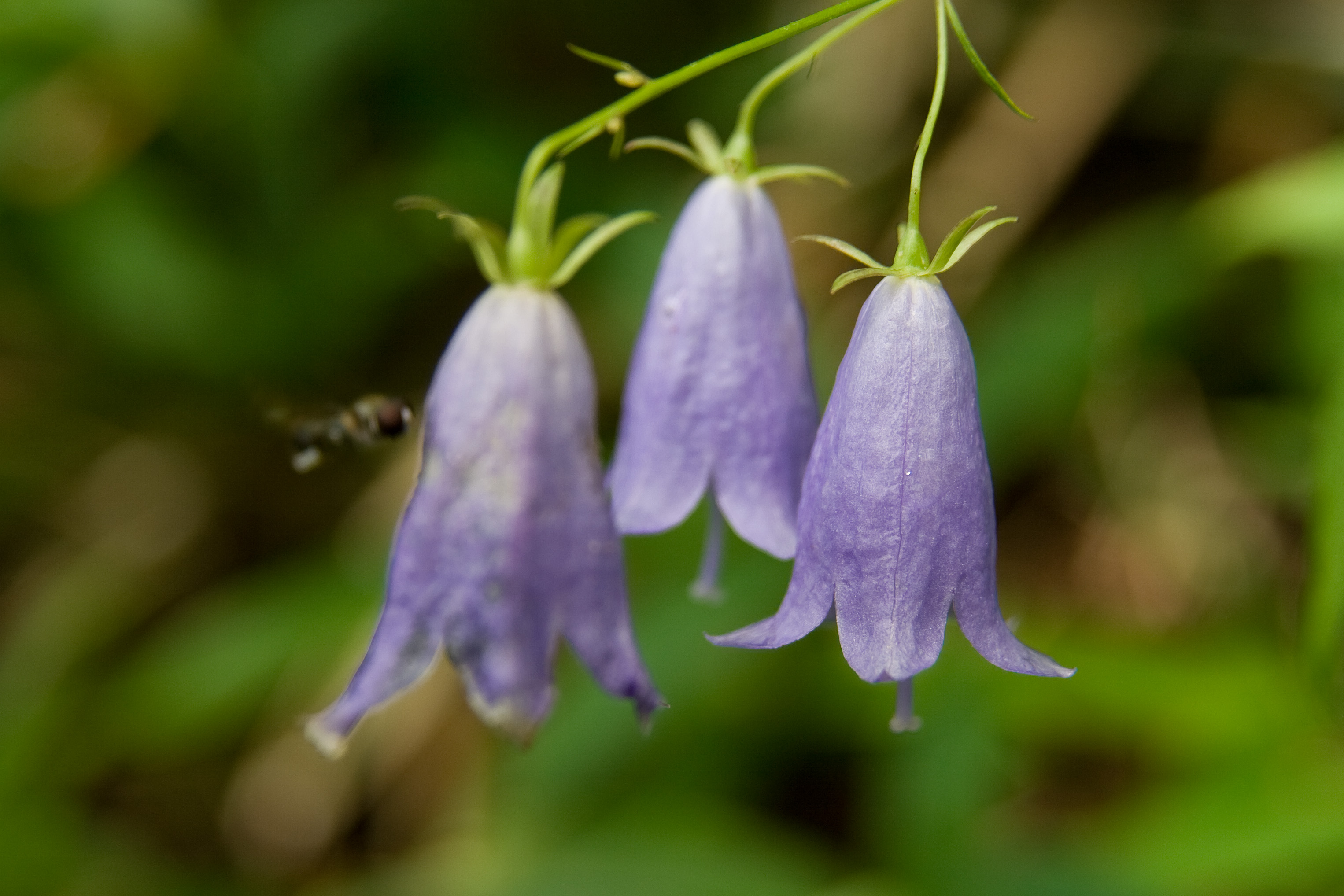
Adenophora nikoensis

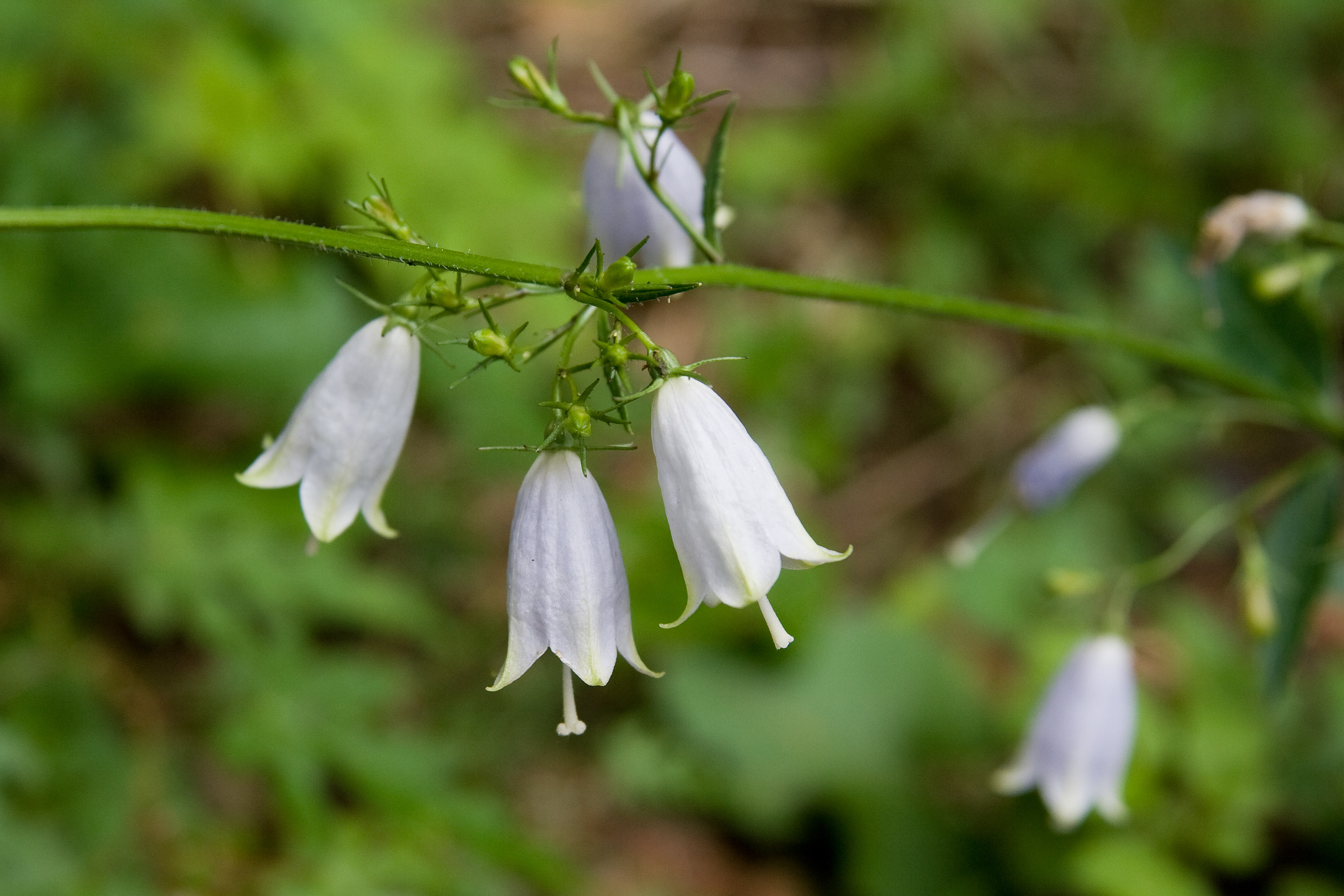
Adenophora triphylla var. japonica

- Adenophora amurica C.X.Fu & M.Y.Liu – Heilongjiang
- Adenophora biformifolia Y.Z.Zhao – Inner Mongolia
- Adenophora biloba Y.Z.Zhao – Inner Mongolia
- Adenophora borealis D.Y.Hong & Y.Z.Zhao – Inner Mongolia and Hebei
- Adenophora brevidiscifera D.Y.Hong – Sichuan
- Adenophora capillaris Hemsl. – Chongqing, Guizhou, Hebei, Henan, Hubei, Inner Mongolia, Shaanxi, Shandong, Shanxi, Sichuan, Yunnan
- Adenophora changaica Gubanov & Kamelin – Mongolia
- Adenophora coelestis Diels – Sichuan, Yunnan
- Adenophora contracta (Kitag.) J.Z.Qiu & D.Y.Hong – Liaoning, Inner Mongolia
- Adenophora cordifolia D.Y.Hong – Henan
- Adenophora daqingshanica Y.Z.Zhao & L.Q.Zhao – Inner Mongolia
- Adenophora dawuensis D.Y.Hong – Sichuan
- Adenophora delavayi (Franch.) D.Y.Hong – northwestern Yunnan
- Adenophora divaricata Franch. & Sav. – spreading-branch ladybell – Honshu, Shikoku, Korea, Amur, Primorye, Khabarovsk, Hebei, Heilongjiang, Jilin, Liaoning, Shandong, Shanxi
- Adenophora elata Nannf. – Hebei, Inner Mongolia, Shanxi
- Adenophora fusifolia Y.N.Lee – South Korea
- Adenophora gmelinii (Biehler) Fisch. (synonym Adenophora taquetii H.Lév) – narrow-leaf ladybell, Jejudo ladybell – Buryatiya, Chita, Amur, Primorye, Mongolia, Korea, Hebei, Heilongjiang, Jilin, Liaoning, Inner Mongolia, Shanxi
- Adenophora golubinzevaeana Reverd. – Krasnoyarsk
- Adenophora grandiflora Nakai – big-flower ladybell – Korea
- Adenophora hatsushimae Kitam. – Kyushu
- Adenophora himalayana Feer – Kazakhstan, Kyrgyzstan, Tajikistan, Tibet, Nepal, northern India, Xinjiang, Gansu, Shaanxi, Sichuan
- Adenophora hubeiensis D.Y.Hong – Hubei
- Adenophora × izuensis H.Ohba & S.Watan. – Honshu
- Adenophora jacutica Fed. – Yakutiya
- Adenophora jasionifolia Franch. – Tibet, Sichuan, Yunnan
- Adenophora khasiana (Hook.f. & Thomson) Collett & Hemsl. (syn. A. bulleyana Diels) – Assam, Bhutan, Myanmar, Tibet, Sichuan, Yunnan
- Adenophora lamarckii Fisch. – Lamark's ladybell – Irkutsk, Altai, Kazakhstan, Xinjiang, Mongolia, Korea
- Adenophora liliifolia (L.) A.DC. – lily-leaf ladybell – central and eastern Europe (Germany, Switzerland, Italy, etc.) east to Xinjiang
- Adenophora liliifolioides Pax & K.Hoffm. – Gansu, Shaanxi, Sichuan, Tibet
- Adenophora linearifolia D.Y.Hong – Sichuan
- Adenophora lobophylla D.Y.Hong – Sichuan
- Adenophora longipedicellata D.Y.Hong – Chongqing, Guizhou, W Hubei, Sichuan
- Adenophora maximowicziana Makino – Shikoku
- Adenophora micrantha D.Y.Hong – Inner Mongolia
- Adenophora morrisonensis Hayata – Taiwan
- Adenophora nikoensis Franch. & Sav. – Honshu
- Adenophora ningxianica S.Ge & D.Y.Hong – Gansu, Inner Mongolia, Ningxia
- Adenophora palustris Kom. – marsh ladybell – Jilin, Korea, Honshu
- Adenophora pereskiifolia (Fisch. ex Schult.) G.Don (synonyms Adenophora kayasanensis Kitam. and Adenophora racemosa J.Lee & S.Lee) – Manchurian ladybell, Korean ladybell, racemose ladybell, Gayasan ladybell – Mongolia, Japan, Korea, Heilongjiang, Jilin, Amur, Kuril Islands, Primorye, Khabarovsk, Chita, Buryatiya
- Adenophora petiolata Pax & K.Hoffm. – Anhui, Chongqing, Fujian, Gansu, Guangdong, Guangxi, Guizhou, Hebei, Henan, Hubei, Hunan, Jiangsu, Jiangxi, Shaanxi, Shanxi, Sichuan, Zhejiang
- Adenophora pinifolia Kitag. – Liaoning
- Adenophora polyantha Nakai – many-flower ladybell – Korea, Anhui, Gansu, Hebei, Henan, Jiangsu, Liaoning, Inner Mongolia, Ningxia, Shaanxi, Shandong, Shanxi
- Adenophora potaninii Korsh. – Gansu, Hebei, Henan, Liaoning, Inner Mongolia, Ningxia, Qinghai, Shaanxi, Shanxi, Sichuan
- Adenophora probatovae A.E.Kozhevn. – Primorye
- Adenophora remotidens Hemsl. – Incheon ladybell – Korea
- Adenophora remotiflora (Siebold & Zucc.) Miq. (synonym Adenophora erecta S.Lee, Joongku Lee & S.Kim) – scattered ladybell – Primorye, Japan, Korea, Manchuria
- Adenophora rupestris Reverd. – Irkutsk
- Adenophora rupincola Hemsl. – Hubei, Hunan, Jiangxi, Sichuan
- Adenophora sajanensis Stepanov – Krasnoyarsk
- Adenophora sinensis A.DC. – Anhui, Fujian, Guangdong, Hunan, Jiangxi
- Adenophora stenanthina (Ledeb.) Kitag. – Mongolia, Gansu, Hebei, Jilin, Inner Mongolia, Ningxia, Qinghai, Shaanxi, Shanxi, Altai, Amur, Irkutsk, Chita, Buryatiya, Tuva
- Adenophora stenophylla Hemsl. – Mongolia, Inner Mongolia, Manchuria
- Adenophora stricta Miq. – upright ladybell – Korea, Japan, Anhui, Chongqing, Fujian, Gansu, Guangxi, Guizhou, Henan, Hubei, Hunan, Jiangsu, Jiangxi, Shaanxi, Sichuan, Yunnan, Zhejiang
- Adenophora subjenisseensis (Kurbatsky) A.V.Grebenjuk – central Siberia
- Adenophora sublata Kom. – Primorye, Khabarovsk
- Adenophora taiwaniana S.S.Ying – Taiwan
- Adenophora takedae Makino – Honshu
- Adenophora tashiroi (Makino & Nakai) Makino & Nakai – Fukue Island, Jeju-do Island
- Adenophora taurica (Sukaczev) Juz. – Crimea
- Adenophora trachelioides Maxim. – Anhui, Hebei, Jiangsu, Liaoning, Inner Mongolia, Shandong, Zhejiang
- Adenophora tricuspidata (Fisch. ex Schult.) A.DC. – Heilongjiang, Inner Mongolia, much of Asiatic Russia
- Adenophora triphylla (Thunb.) A.DC. – giant bellflower – Korea, Japan, Ryukyu Islands, Taiwan, Laos, Vietnam, Russian Far East, Siberia
- Adenophora tuvinica Knjaz. – Tuva
- Adenophora uryuensis Miyabe & Tatew. – Hokkaido
- Adenophora wilsonii Nannf. – Chongqing, Gansu, Guizhou, Hubei, Shaanxi, Sichuan
- Adenophora wulingshanica D.Y.Hong – Beijing
- Adenophora xiaoxiensis D.G.Zhang, D.Xie & X.Y.Yi – Hunan
- Adenophora xifengensis (P.F.Tu & Y.S.Zhou) P.F.Tu & Y.S.Zhou – Gansu

== Uses ==
Many Adenophora species have been used in traditional Chinese medicine.
