= Yu Yee oil =

Medicated ointment

Yu Yee oil (Chinese: 如意油; Jyutping: jyu4 ji3 jau4; pinyin: rúyì yóu) is a medicated ointment in Southeast Asia of Malaysia and Singapore. The name is based on the term ruyi (Chinese: 如意; pinyin: rúyì), which literally means "as one wishes". It is available mainly in traditional Chinese medical halls and provision shops, and can also be ordered online.

== Health claims ==
Yu Yee oil is a herbal medicated ointment for topical (skin) application. It is use traditionally to colic and bloating problems in babies. It is also used to treat mild muscle and joint aches. There is some scientific literature on peppermint oil, the main putative active ingredient in Yu Yee oil, but the only mention for a topical application is for tension headaches.

== Composition ==
- Peppermint oil (36.0% w/v)
- Clove oil (2.6% w/v)
- Nutmeg oil (0.6% w/v)
- Menthol (1.6% w/v)
- Borneol Cortex Cinnamoni (1.0% w/v)
- Resina Calamus Draco (1.0% w/v)
- Light Liquid Paraffin (1.0%% w/v)
