= 4-Hexylresorcinol =

Chemical compound

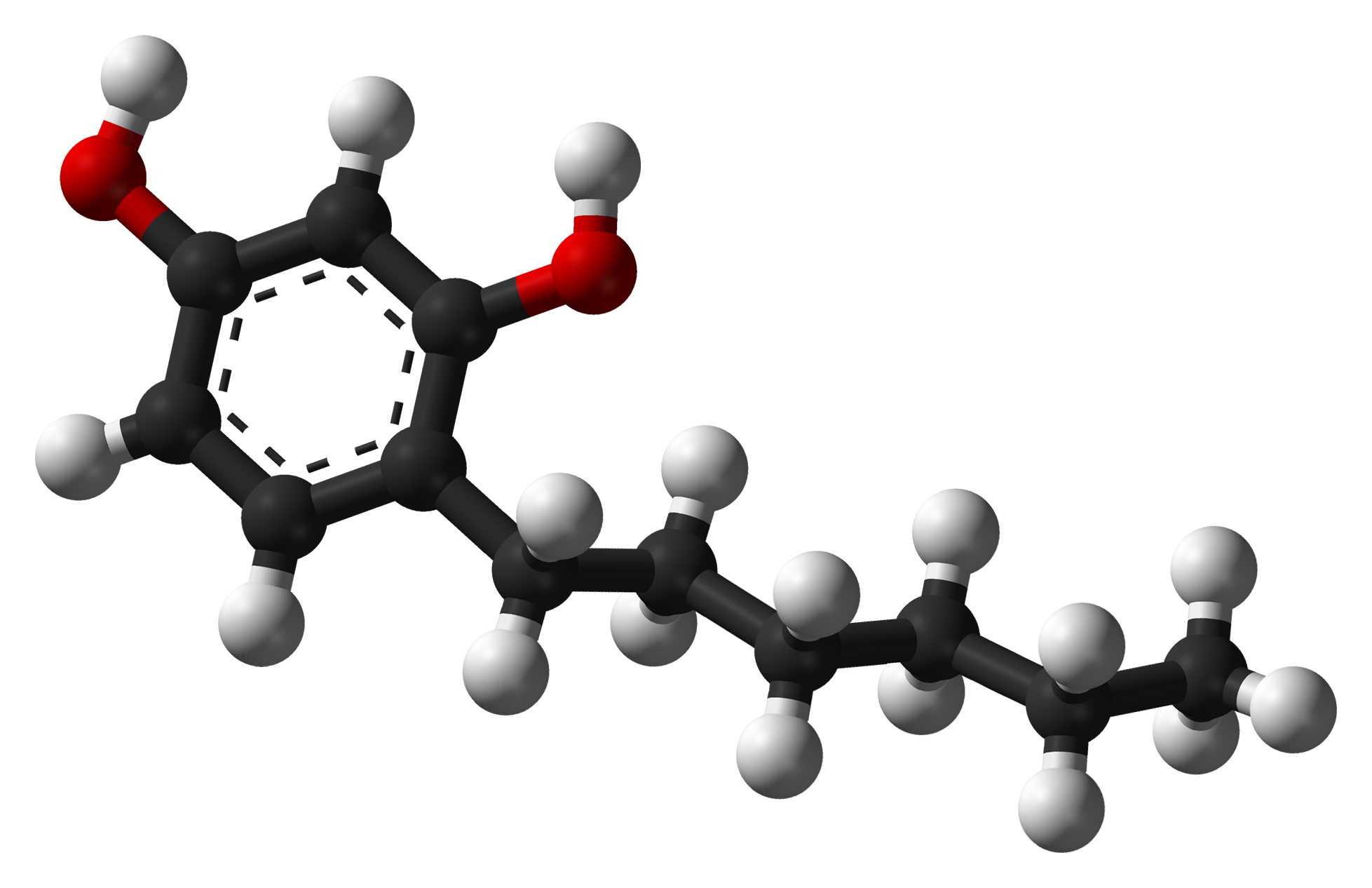

Clinical data
- Trade names: S.T.37, Crystoids
- AHFS/Drugs.com: International Drug Names
- ATC code: R02AA12 (WHO)

Identifiers
- IUPAC name: 4-hexylbenzene-1,3-diol
- CAS Number: 136-77-6
- PubChem CID: 3610
- ChemSpider: 21106121
- UNII: R9QTB5E82N
- KEGG: D04441
- ChEMBL: ChEMBL443605
- CompTox Dashboard (EPA): DTXSID1020699
- ECHA InfoCard: 100.004.780

Chemical and physical data
- Formula: C_{12}H_{18}O_{2}
- Molar mass: 194.274 g·mol^{−1}
- 3D model (JSmol): Interactive image
- Melting point: 68 to 69 °C (154 to 156 °F)
- Boiling point: 333 to 335 °C (631 to 635 °F)
- SMILES: Oc1cc(O)ccc1CCCCCC
- InChI: InChI=1S/C12H18O2/c1-2-3-4-5-6-10-7-8-11(13)9-12(10)14/h7-9,13-14H,2-6H2,1H3; Key:WFJIVOKAWHGMBH-UHFFFAOYSA-N

4-Hexylresorcinol is an organic compound with local anaesthetic, antiseptic, and anthelmintic properties.

As an antiseptic, it is marketed as S.T.37 by Numark Laboratories, Inc. (in a 0.1% solution) for oral pain relief and as a topical antiseptic. It is available for use topically on small skin infections or as an ingredient in throat lozenges.

As an anthelmintic, 4-hexylresorcinol was sold under the brand Crystoids. Sytheon Ltd., USA markets 4-hexylresorcinol (trade named Synovea HR).

Johnson & Johnson uses 4-hexylresorcinol in its Neutrogena, Aveeno, and RoC skincare products as an anti-aging cream. 4-Hexylresorcinol has been used commercially by many cosmetic and personal care companies, such as Mary Kay, Clarins, Unilever, Murad, Facetheory, Arbonne, and many small and large companies.

A study published in Chemical Research in Toxicology shows that 4-hexylresorcinol used as a food additive (E-586) exhibits some estrogenic activity, i.e. resembles action of the female sex hormone estrogen. However, a recent study published in Applied Sciences shows that 4-hexylresorcinol did not change the expression of estrogen receptor-α, -β, or p-ERK1/2 in MCF-7 cells. In an ovariectomized animal model, the 4HR group showed similar levels of ERα, ERβ, and prolactin expression in the pituitary gland compared to the solvent only group, while the estradiol group showed higher levels. Serum prolactin levels were similar between the 4HR and solvent only groups.

In one study, 4-hexylresorcinol increased the shelf life of shrimp by reducing melanosis (black spots).

In mice with cancer, 4-hexylresorcinol inhibited NF-κB and extended their survival rate.
