= Performic acid =

Skeletal structure of performic acid
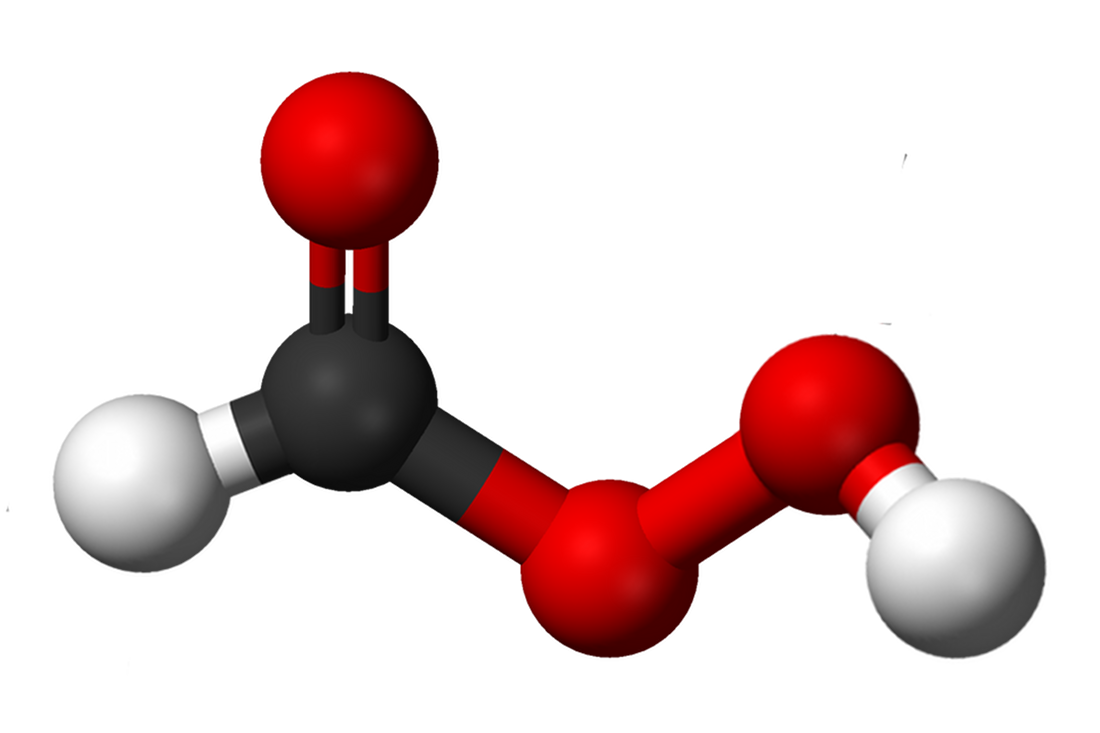
3D model of performic acid

Names
- Preferred IUPAC name Methaneperoxoic acid
- Other names Performic acid Hydroperoxyformaldehyde; Formyl hydroperoxide Permethanoic acid Peroxyformic acid

Identifiers
CAS Number	107-32-4
3D model (JSmol)	Interactive image
ChemSpider	59441
ECHA InfoCard	100.124.147
EC Number	600-819-9
PubChem CID	66051
UNII	XEL6R975Q4
CompTox Dashboard (EPA)	DTXSID40902397
- InChI: InChI=1S/CH2O3/c2-1-4-3/h1,3H Key: SCKXCAADGDQQCS-UHFFFAOYSA-N
- SMILES: O=COO

Properties
Chemical formula	CH_{2}O_{3}
Molar mass	62.024 g·mol^{−1}
Appearance	Colorless liquid
Melting point	−18 °C (0 °F; 255 K)
Boiling point	50 °C (122 °F; 323 K) (at 13.3 kPa; 90% pure acid)
Acidity (pK_{a})	7.1
- Except where otherwise noted, data are given for materials in their standard state (at 25 °C [77 °F], 100 kPa). verify (what is ?) Infobox references

Performic acid (PFA) is an organic compound with the formula CH_{2}O_{3}. It is an unstable colorless liquid which can be produced by mixing formic acid with hydrogen peroxide. Owing to its oxidizing and disinfecting action, it is used in the chemical, medical and food industries.

== Properties and applications ==
Performic acid is a colorless liquid soluble in water, alcohols, ether, benzene, chloroform and other organic solvents. Its strong oxidizing properties are used for cleaving disulfide bonds in protein mapping, as well as for epoxidation, hydroxylation and oxidation reactions in organic synthesis. In the medical and food industries, performic acid is commonly used to disinfect equipment. It is effective against viruses, bacterial spores, algae, microscopic fungi and mycobacteria, as well as other microorganisms such as zooplankton.

The popularity of performic acid as a sterilizer originates from the safe nature of its degradation products, mostly carbon dioxide, oxygen and water. The disinfecting action of performic acid is also faster than that of the related compounds peracetic acid and hydrogen peroxide. The major drawbacks of performic acid are handling dangers related to its high reactivity, as well as instability, especially upon heating, which means that the acid must be used within about 12 hours of it being synthesised.

== Synthesis ==
Performic acid is synthesized by the reaction of formic acid and hydrogen peroxide by the following equilibrium reaction:

Synthesis of Performic acid

Synthesis of pure performic acid has not been reported, but aqueous solutions up to about 48% can be formed by simply mixing equimolar amounts of concentrated aqueous reactant solutions. Using an excess of either reactant shifts the equilibrium towards the product side. The aqueous product solution can be distilled to increase the concentration of performic acid to about 90%.

This reaction is reversible and can be used for large scale industrial production if accelerated with a catalyst; however, its temperature must be kept below 80–85 °C to avoid an explosion. The catalyst can be nitric, hydrofluoric, phosphoric or sulfuric acid or their salts; it can also be an organic compound containing at least one ester group, such as carboxylic acid ester or peracetic acid.

== Safety ==
Performic acid is non-toxic; it does irritate the skin, but less so than peracetic acid. Concentrated acid (above 50%) is highly reactive; it readily decomposes upon heating, and explodes upon rapid heating to 80–85 °C. It may ignite or explode at room temperature when combined with flammable substances, such as formaldehyde, benzaldehyde, or aniline, and explodes violently upon addition of metal powders. For this reason, spilled performic acid is diluted with cold water and collected with neutral, non-flammable inorganic absorbents, such as vermiculite.
