= 2,4-Dichlorobenzyl alcohol =

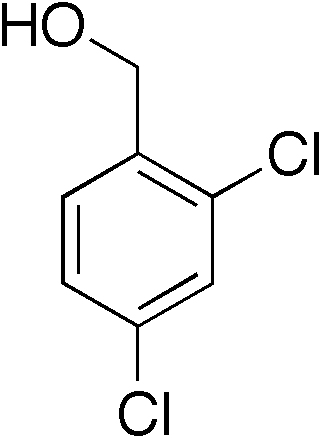

Names
- Preferred IUPAC name (2,4-Dichlorophenyl)methanol
- Other names Dybenal; Rapidosept; Myacide SP

Identifiers
CAS Number	1777-82-8
3D model (JSmol)	Interactive image; Interactive image
ChEBI	CHEBI:48220
ChEMBL	ChEMBL3184437
ChemSpider	14918
ECHA InfoCard	100.015.646
PubChem CID	15684
UNII	1NKX3648J9
CompTox Dashboard (EPA)	DTXSID9041362
- InChI: InChI=1S/C7H6Cl2O/c8-6-2-1-5(4-10)7(9)3-6/h1-3,10H,4H2 Key: DBHODFSFBXJZNY-UHFFFAOYSA-N; InChI=1/C7H6Cl2O/c8-6-2-1-5(4-10)7(9)3-6/h1-3,10H,4H2 Key: DBHODFSFBXJZNY-UHFFFAOYAI
- SMILES: C1=CC(=C(C=C1Cl)Cl)CO; Clc1cc(Cl)ccc1CO

Properties
Chemical formula	C_{7}H_{6}Cl_{2}O
Molar mass	177.02 g·mol^{−1}
Melting point	57 to 60 °C (135 to 140 °F; 330 to 333 K)
Boiling point	150 °C (302 °F; 423 K) 25 mmHg

Pharmacology
ATC code	R02AA03 (WHO)
- Except where otherwise noted, data are given for materials in their standard state (at 25 °C [77 °F], 100 kPa). verify (what is ?) Infobox references

2,4-Dichlorobenzyl alcohol is a mild antiseptic, able to kill bacteria and viruses associated with mouth and throat infections. It is a common ingredient in throat lozenges such as Cofsils, Strepsils, Lorsept, and Gorpils. It is also an ingredient in the European product Neo Borocillina. A low-pH throat lozenge containing dichlorobenzyl alcohol (1.2 mg) and amylmetacresol (0.6 mg) has been found to deactivate respiratory syncytial virus, influenza A, and SARS-CoV (Note: referring to the SARS-CoV-1 strains that caused or evolved in the 2002–2004 SARS outbreak, and not necessarily the SARS-CoV-2 strains that caused or evolved in the 2020-2023 COVID-19 pandemic), but not adenovirus or rhinovirus. A dentifrice containing 10% sodium benzoate and 0.3% dichlorobenzyl alcohol maintains antimicrobial activity for 5 to 10 minutes after brushing.
