= Cetrimonium =

Cetrimonium, cetyl trimethylammonium, or hexadecyltrimethylammonium is a quaternary ammonium cation whose salts are used as antiseptics:

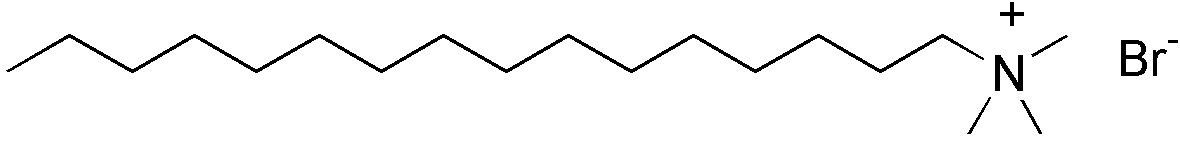
- Cetrimonium bromide
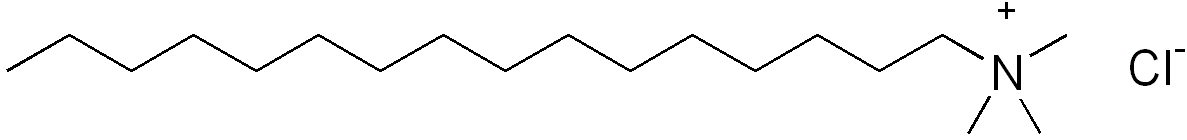
- Cetrimonium chloride

They have the ATC codes D08AJ02 (WHO) (as skin antiseptics) and R02AA17 (WHO) (as throat antiseptics).
