= Euflavine =

Chemical compound

Combination of
- Acriflavinium chloride: antiseptic
- Proflavine: antiseptic

Clinical data
- Routes of administration: topical
- ATC code: D08AA03 (WHO)

Identifiers
- CAS Number: 86-40-8
- PubChem CID: 452192
- ChemSpider: none
- UNII: 1TW3Q60E36
- CompTox Dashboard (EPA): DTXSID30988185

Euflavine is an antiseptic and disinfectant.
