= C17H20N4O2 =

The molecular formula C_{17}H_{20}N_{4}O_{2} (molar mass: 312.366 g/mol, exact mass: 312.1586 u) may refer to:

- Azidomorphine
- Propamidine
