= Acanthamoeba keratitis =

Eye infection caused by a protist

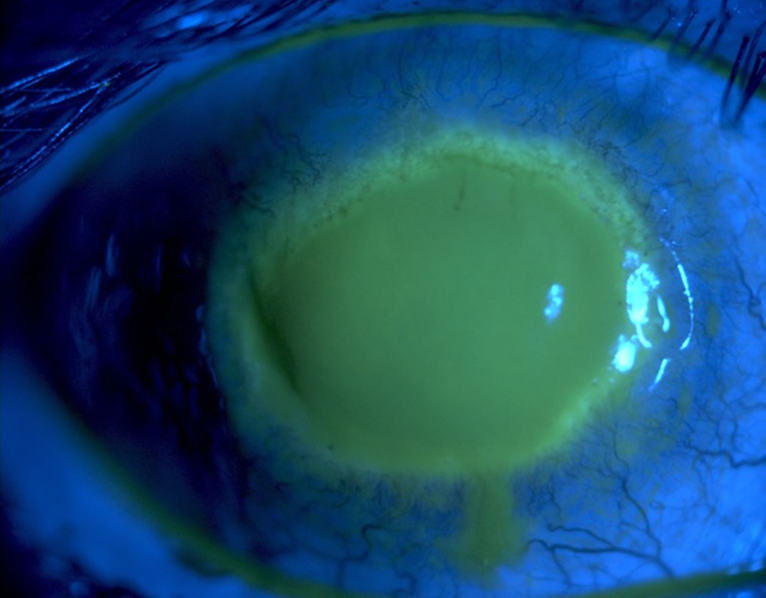
- Fluorescein observation of an eye with Acanthamoeba keratitis
- Specialty: Ophthalmology, infectious diseases
- Complications: Visual impairment, blindness
- Risk factors: Contact lens wearer, contaminated water supply, low socioeconomic status
- Treatment: Topical medications, surgical debridement, corneal transplantation
- Frequency: 1.2–3 million people per year; 1 per 10,000 contact wearers

Acanthamoeba keratitis (AK) is a rare disease in which amoebae of the genus Acanthamoeba invade the clear portion of the front (cornea) of the eye. It affects roughly 100 people in the United States each year. Acanthamoeba are protozoa found nearly ubiquitously in soil and water and can cause infections of the skin, eyes, and central nervous system.

Infection of the cornea by Acanthamoeba is difficult to treat with conventional medications, and AK may cause permanent visual impairment or blindness, due to damage to the cornea or through damage to other structures important to vision. Recently, AK has been recognized as an orphan disease and a funded project, Orphan Drug for Acanthamoeba Keratitis (ODAK), has tested the effects of a diverse range drugs and biocides on AK.

== Pathogenesis ==
In the United States, Acanthamoeba keratitis is nearly always associated with soft contact lens use. Acanthamoeba spp. is most commonly introduced to the eye by contact lenses that have been exposed to the organism through the use of contaminated lens solution, using homemade saline-based solution or tap water, or from wearing contact lenses while bathing or swimming. However, it may also be introduced to the eye by exposure to soil or vegetation, or by trauma. In fact, the first case of Acanthamoeba keratitis described was due to ocular trauma. Once on the contact lens, Acanthamoeba is able to survive in the space between the contact lens and the surface of the eye. Soft contact lenses are more adherent to the corneal surface than hard lenses, which allows the Acanthamoeba organism to bind to mannosylated glycoproteins on the corneal surface. Expression of these proteins on the corneal surface is increased by contact lens use. This increase in glycoprotein content, along with microtrauma to the corneal epithelial surface due to contact lens use increases the risk for infection. Once the organism has gained access to the surface of the eye, it is able to invade through the epithelium and Bowman's layer. In some cases, the infection can then group around corneal nerves, producing radial deposits (radial keratoneuritis), and causing extreme pain. These are features also seen in viral and bacterial keratitis, and may be misleading. The organism is also capable of invading deeper into the cornea; using metalloproteases it is able to penetrate deep into the stroma of the cornea. As the disease progresses, it may penetrate through the cornea but very rarely causes infection inside the eye (endophthalmitis) due to a robust neutrophil response in the anterior chamber.

While the vast majority of cases of Acanthamoeba keratitis occur in contact lens wearers, there have been many cases of Acanthamoeba described in those who do not wear contact lenses, especially outside the United States. In non-contact lens users, the greatest risks for developing Acanthamoeba infection are trauma and exposure to contaminated water. Further predisposing factors include contaminated home water supply, and low socioeconomic status. Infection is also more commonly seen in tropical or sub-tropical climates.

Beyond the route of inoculation into the eye and external risk factors, host factors are also likely to play a significant role in the development of Acanthamoeba keratitis. In fact, studies of contact lens users in the United Kingdom, Japan, and New Zealand found that 400 to 800 per 10,000 asymptomatic contact lens users had lens storage cases contaminated with Acanthamoeba spp. However, the rate of Acanthamoeba keratitis among these patients was only 0.01 to 1.49 per 10,000 contact lens users. Although the exact host factors have not been fully described, it is likely that corneal epithelial defects, tear film composition, eye surface pH, and the level of anti-Acanthamoeba IgA antibodies in the tear film play a role in the development of Acanthamoeba keratitis.

=== Life cycle ===
Species within the genus, Acanthamoeba, are generally free-living trophozoites. These trophozoites are relatively ubiquitous and can live in, but are not restricted to, tap water, freshwater lakes, rivers and soil. In addition to the trophozoite stage, the organism can also form a double-walled cyst which may also be present in the environment, and can be very difficult to eradicate through medical treatment. Both of these stages are usually non-nucleated and reproduce by the means of binary fission.

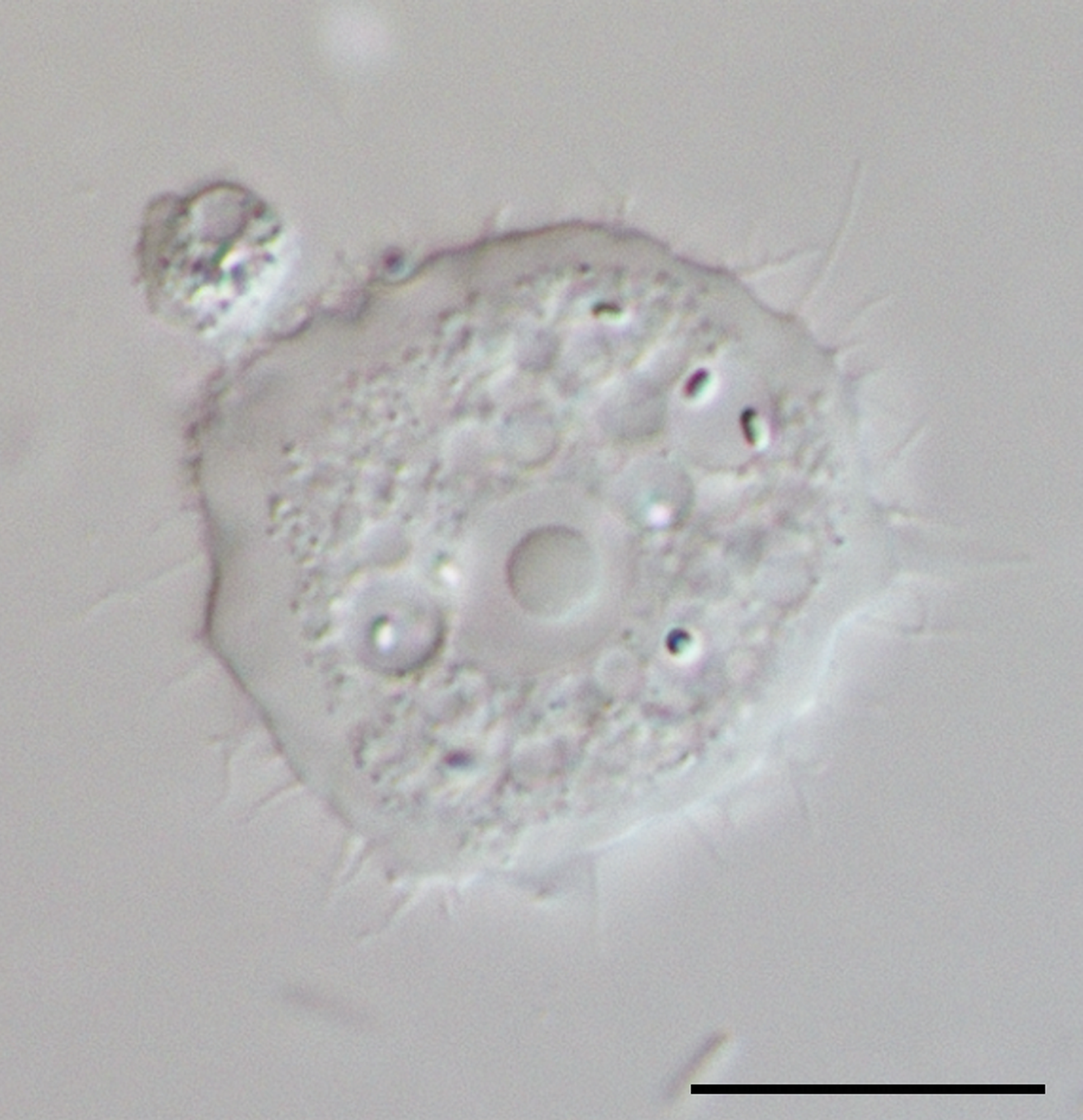
Acanthamoeba trophozoite. Scale bar: 10 μm

== Diagnosis ==
Due to the relative rarity of Acanthamoeba keratitis (AK) compared to other causes of keratitis (bacterial, viral, etc.), it is often misdiagnosed, especially in the early stages of the disease. AK should be considered in all patients who use contact lenses, and following corneal abrasions or trauma. A thorough history should be obtained, especially relating to contact lens use and any recent changes in contact lens solution, exposure of the eyes to water or foreign objects, and symptoms that the patient is experiencing. The symptoms classically attributed to AK include decreased or blurred vision, sensitivity to light (photophobia), redness of the eye (conjunctival hyperemia), and pain out of proportion to physical exam findings. Another clinical feature that can distinguish Acanthamoeba from bacterial causes of keratitis is a lack of discharge from the eye.

On physical exam, findings will depend on the stage of the disease. Early manifestations in the cornea can be seen as punctate keratopathy, pseudodendrites, and epithelial or subepithelial corneal deposits. These features can lead an examiner to confuse AK with a viral keratitis, such as that caused by varicella zoster virus or herpes simplex virus. As the disease progresses and infiltrates the corneal stroma, a classic "ring infiltrate" may be present on examination (although this is only seen in about 50% of cases). Corneal ulceration, or in severe cases, perforation, can also occur and may be accompanied by hypopyon.

In cases of keratitis, diagnosis is typically achieved through evaluation of corneal scrapings. Scrapings are taking from the cornea, and plated on agar for culture, and also can be stained using Gram stain and Giemsa stain to differentiate between bacterial keratitis and AK. To culture Acanthamoeba, scrapings are placed on a non-nutrient agar saline plate seeded with a gram-negative bacteria such as E. coli. If Acanthamoeba are present, they will reproduce readily and become visible on the plate under 10–20 times objective on an inverted microscope. Polymerase chain reaction (PCR) can be used to confirm a diagnosis of Acanthamoeba keratitis, especially when contact lenses are not involved. Confocal microscopy is a non-invasive technique that allows visualization of Acanthamoeba in vivo in cases in which corneal scraping, culture, and cytology do not yield a diagnosis.

== Treatment ==
Once Acanthamoeba keratitis is diagnosed, initiation of timely and appropriate treatment will have a significant impact on visual outcomes. Medical therapy aims to eradicate both trophozoite and cystic forms of Acanthamoeba and also control the inflammatory response.

=== Medical therapy ===
Multiple classes of drugs have been found to be effective in killing the trophozoite form of Acanthamoeba, including anti-bacterial, anti-fungal, anti-protozoal, and anti-neoplastic agents. However, no single therapy has been found to eliminate both trophozoite and cystic forms, and to eradicate corneal infection.

One class of medications used in treatment is the biguanides, which include polyhexamethylene biguanide (PHMB) 0.02% to 0.06% drops, and chlorhexidine 0.02 to 0.2% drops. These medications disrupt the cell wall of the trophozoite organism, leading to its death. However, these agents have shown limited efficacy against the cystic forms. Due to the efficacy of these drugs against the Acanthamoeba, as well as their low toxicity to the cornea, they are commonly used as the first line medications in the treatment of AK. Biguanides have also been found to act synergistically when used in combination with diamidines, with propamidine isethionate and hexamidine being the most commonly used. A limitation of diamidine use is relative corneal toxicity with long term use. A combined regimen of propamidine, miconazole nitrate, and neomycin has also been suggested. Due to the potential for negative longterm visual outcomes with AK, therapy is usually started with a combination of a biguanide and a diamidine. Early use of high dose dual therapy helps to eliminate both trophozoite and cyst forms of the organism, while also preventing deep penetration of cysts into the corneal stroma. Cysts that are not eradicated from the cornea will cause recurrence. The treatment is often initiated by instilling drops onto the surface of the eye every hour, 24 hours a day, for at least the first 48–72 hours. If an appropriate response to therapy, this may be reduced to hourly administrations during the day only, which is continued for several weeks to months.

Beyond anti-amoebic therapies, there is also a role for topical steroids of anti-inflammatory medications in the treatment of Acanthamoeba keratitis. During infection, severe inflammation in the cornea and anterior chamber can cause more severe symptoms including pain and visual disturbance. Topical steroids may be used to reduce this inflammation and thereby alleviate symptoms. However, the role of steroids is typically very limited, because their dampening of the immune response may lead to worsening of the infection. Additionally, steroids can increase the number of trophozoites in the cornea by inducing excystation. Therefore it is typically recommended that steroids be used briefly to aid in symptom resolution, and that anti-amoebic agents be used both during, and for several weeks after topical steroid use.

=== Surgical treatment ===
Surgical debridement of an infected cornea can also be used to reduce organism load and excise devitalized tissue from the cornea. It may also improve the efficacy of medical therapy by promoting penetration of medication into deeper layers of the cornea. In cases of corneal ulceration or perforation, or if corneal scarring is severe, corneal transplant may be required. This typically involves full thickness transplantation of the cornea from a healthy donor eye. The size of the graft should be kept as small as possible, as larger grafts carry a great risk of host rejection, and due to the possibility of graft revision surgery. While surgery is capable of restoring vision by replacing a damaged cornea, it also carries risks of recurrent Acanthamoeba infection or graft failure. For this reason, anti-amoebic medications should be started prior to surgery, and continued for several weeks afterward. If there is suspicion or evidence of recurrent infection, cultures should be sent. If cultures are positive, anti-amoebic therapy should be continued for 6 months.

Outcomes following surgery are typically much better for patients who receive surgery for vision improvement following infection resolution, and therefore all efforts should be made to maximize medical management before attempting surgery.

== Epidemiology ==
A study in Austria reported a total of 154 cases of Acanthamoeba keratitis over a 20-year period. The age of those with AK ranged from 8 to 82 years old and 58% of the people were female. The data showed that 89% of the infected patients were contact lens wearers, almost all cases occurred only in one eye, and 19% required a corneal transplant.

A study in 2023 calculated the incidence of acanthamoeba keratitis to be approximately 2.9 cases per million people.
