= Adrenalone =

Chemical compound

Clinical data
- Pregnancy category: No data
- Routes of administration: Topical
- ATC code: A01AD06 (WHO) B02BC05 (WHO)

Pharmacokinetic data
- Metabolism: MAO, COMT
- Excretion: Renal

Identifiers
- IUPAC name: 1-(3,4-dihydroxyphenyl)-2-(methylamino)ethanone
- CAS Number: 99-45-6 62-13-5 (hydrochloride)
- PubChem CID: 7436
- ChemSpider: 7158
- UNII: EGU41QL329
- KEGG: D02774
- ChEMBL: ChEMBL2103996
- CompTox Dashboard (EPA): DTXSID5048710
- ECHA InfoCard: 100.002.506

Chemical and physical data
- Formula: C_{9}H_{11}NO_{3}
- Molar mass: 181.191 g·mol^{−1}
- 3D model (JSmol): Interactive image
- Melting point: 235 to 236 °C (455 to 457 °F) (decomposes)
- SMILES: O=C(c1cc(O)c(O)cc1)CNC
- InChI: InChI=1S/C9H11NO3/c1-10-5-9(13)6-2-3-7(11)8(12)4-6/h2-4,10-12H,5H2,1H3; Key:PZMVOUYYNKPMSI-UHFFFAOYSA-N

Adrenalone is an adrenergic agonist used as a topical vasoconstrictor and hemostatic. Formerly, it was also used to prolong the action of local anesthetics. It is the ketone form of epinephrine (adrenaline). Contrary to epinephrine, adrenalone mainly acts on alpha-1 adrenergic receptors, but has little affinity for beta receptors. The drug is largely obsolete, being superseded by other hemostatics such as thrombin, fibrinogen, and vasopressin analogues.

== Contraindications and interactions ==
Adrenalone does not stop bleeding from large blood vessels. It is not approved for systemic use. Combination with antithrombotics is not useful because they contravene the action of adrenalone.

== Side effects ==
Vasoconstriction by adrenalone may lead to local necrosis.

== Pregnancy and lactation ==
Adrenalone passes into breast milk, but adverse effects are unlikely because of its very low systemic resorption.

== Chemical properties ==
Adrenalone is a derivative of epinephrine, having the alcohol function replaced with a ketone. As a consequence, it is not optically active any more.

Solubility in water, ethanol and diethyl ether is low. The substance is typically used in form of the hydrochloride, a white crystalline powder which tastes bitter and slightly acidic, and is soluble in water (1:8) and 94% ethanol (1:45). The melting point of the hydrochloride is 243 °C (469 °F).

== Pharmacology ==
After local application, only traces of adrenalone are found in the blood, which is partly a consequence of the vasoconstriction caused by the drug via alpha-1 adrenergic receptors. In an (unspecified) pharmacological model, hypertensive (blood pressure increasing) action has been found to be about 0.5% that of epinephrine at equivalent plasma concentrations. Therefore, systemic effects are unlikely.

Like epinephrine, adrenalone is metabolised by catechol-O-methyl transferase (COMT), yielding 3O-methyladrenalone, which in turn is N-demethylized by monoamine oxidase (MAO). Alternatively, it can first undergo metabolization by MAO and then by COMT; in both cases, the resulting 3O-methyl-N-demethyladrenalone is conjugated to sulfate or glucuronide and excreted by the kidney. No reduction to epinephrine has been observed in vivo.
