= ATC code A01 =

ATC code A01 Stomatological preparations is a therapeutic subgroup of the Anatomical Therapeutic Chemical Classification System, a system of alphanumeric codes developed by the World Health Organization (WHO) for the classification of drugs and other medical products. Subgroup A01 is part of the anatomical group A Alimentary tract and metabolism.

Codes for veterinary use (ATCvet codes) can be created by placing the letter Q in front of the human ATC code: for example, QA01.
National versions of the ATC classification may include additional codes not present in this list, which follows the WHO version.

== A01A Stomatological preparations ==
=== A01AA Caries prophylactic agents ===
A01AA01 Sodium fluoride
A01AA02 Sodium monofluorophosphate
A01AA03 Olaflur
A01AA04 Stannous fluoride
A01AA30 Combinations
A01AA51 Sodium fluoride, combinations

=== A01AB Anti-infectives and antiseptics for local oral treatment ===
A01AB02 Hydrogen peroxide
A01AB03 Chlorhexidine
A01AB04 Amphotericin B
A01AB05 Polynoxylin
A01AB06 Domiphen bromide
A01AB07 Oxyquinoline
A01AB08 Neomycin
A01AB09 Miconazole
A01AB10 Natamycin
A01AB11 Various
A01AB12 Hexetidine
A01AB13 Tetracycline
A01AB14 Benzoxonium chloride
A01AB15 Tibezonium iodide
A01AB16 Mepartricin
A01AB17 Metronidazole
A01AB18 Clotrimazole
A01AB19 Sodium perborate
A01AB21 Chlortetracycline
A01AB22 Doxycycline
A01AB23 Minocycline
A01AB24 Octenidine
A01AB25 Oxytetracycline
A01AB53 Chlorhexidine and cetylpyridinium

=== A01AC Corticosteroids for local oral treatment ===
A01AC01 Triamcinolone
A01AC02 Dexamethasone
A01AC03 Hydrocortisone
A01AC04 Prednisolone
A01AC54 Prednisolone, combinations

=== A01AD Other agents for local oral treatment ===
A01AD01 Epinephrine
A01AD02 Benzydamine
A01AD05 Acetylsalicylic acid
A01AD06 Adrenalone
A01AD07 Amlexanox
A01AD08 Becaplermin
A01AD11 Various
