= Scope (mouthwash) =

Mouthwash brand by Procter & Gamble

Scope Mouthwash logo (1997–2009)

Scope Mouthwash logo (2009–present)

Scope Outlast logo (2009–2012)

Crest Plus Scope Outlast logo (2009–2012)

Scope current logo (2012–present)

Scope is a brand of mouthwash made by Procter & Gamble. It was introduced in 1965, and for many years has been a competitor of Listerine, the longtime dominant mouthwash product.

== Ingredients ==
The active ingredients of Scope Outlast are cetylpyridinium chloride, domiphen bromide, and denatured alcohol.

Inactive ingredients of Scope Outlast are water, glycerin, polysorbate 80, sodium saccharin, sodium benzoate, benzoic acid, Blue 1, and Yellow 5.

== See also ==
- Listerine
