= Cetrimonium chloride =

Names
- Preferred IUPAC name N,N,N-Trimethylhexadecan-1-aminium chloride

Identifiers
CAS Number	112-02-7
3D model (JSmol)	Interactive image
ChEBI	CHEBI:53581
ChemSpider	7862
ECHA InfoCard	100.003.571
PubChem CID	8154
UNII	UC9PE95IBP
CompTox Dashboard (EPA)	DTXSID6026901
- InChI: InChI=1S/C19H42N.ClH/c1-5-6-7-8-9-10-11-12-13-14-15-16-17-18-19-20(2,3)4;/h5-19H2,1-4H3;1H/q+1;/p-1 Key: WOWHHFRSBJGXCM-UHFFFAOYSA-M; InChI=1/C19H42N.ClH/c1-5-6-7-8-9-10-11-12-13-14-15-16-17-18-19-20(2,3)4;/h5-19H2,1-4H3;1H/q+1;/p-1 Key: WOWHHFRSBJGXCM-REWHXWOFAY
- SMILES: CCCCCCCCCCCCCCCC[N+](C)(C)C.[Cl-]

Properties
Chemical formula	C_{19}H_{42}ClN
Molar mass	320.00 g/mol

Pharmacology
ATC code	D08AJ02 (WHO) R02AA17 (WHO)
- Except where otherwise noted, data are given for materials in their standard state (at 25 °C [77 °F], 100 kPa). verify (what is ?) Infobox references

Cetrimonium chloride, or cetyltrimethylammonium chloride (CTAC), is a topical antiseptic and surfactant. Long-chain quaternary ammonium surfactants, such as cetyltrimethylammonium chloride (CTAC), are generally combined with long-chain fatty alcohols, such as stearyl alcohols, in formulations of hair conditioners and shampoos. The cationic surfactant concentration in conditioners is generally of the order of 1–2% and the alcohol concentrations are usually equal to or greater than those of the cationic surfactants. The ternary system, surfactant/fatty alcohol/water, leads to a lamellar structure forming a percolated network giving rise to a gel.

== See also ==
- Behentrimonium chloride – an C_{25} structural analogue
- Cetrimonium bromide – the corresponding bromide salt
