= Hexamidine =

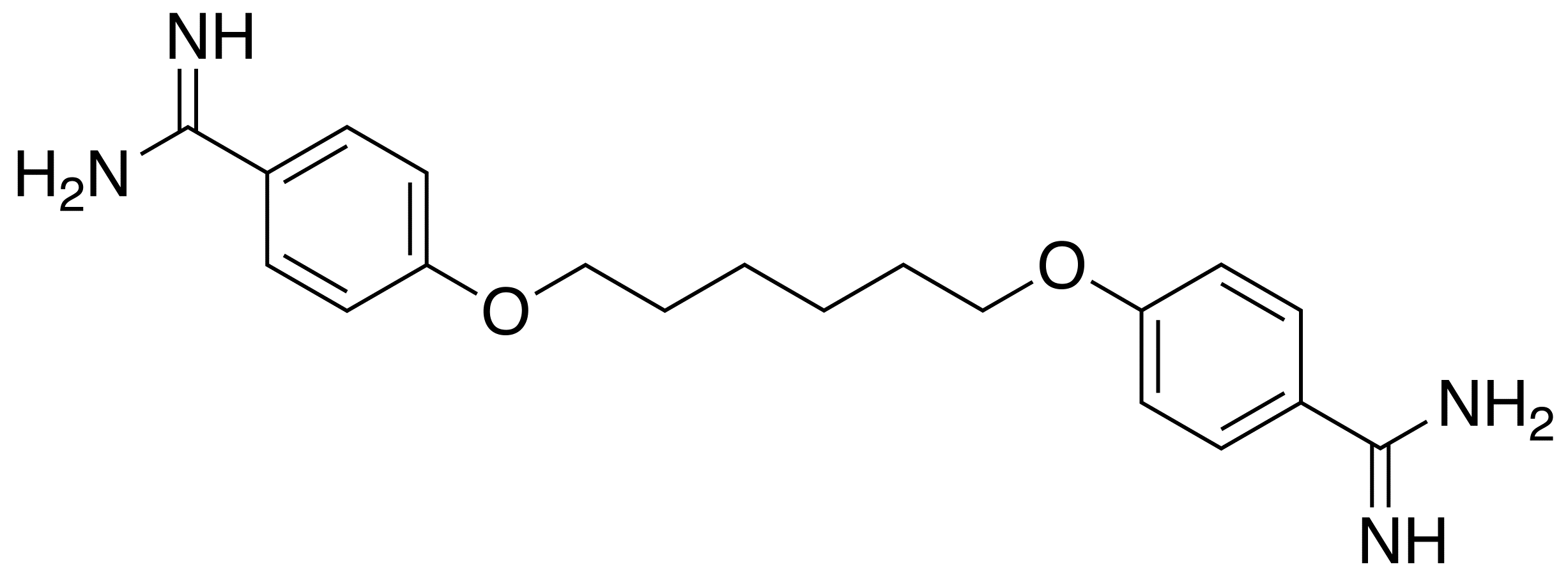
- Skeletal formula of hexamidine

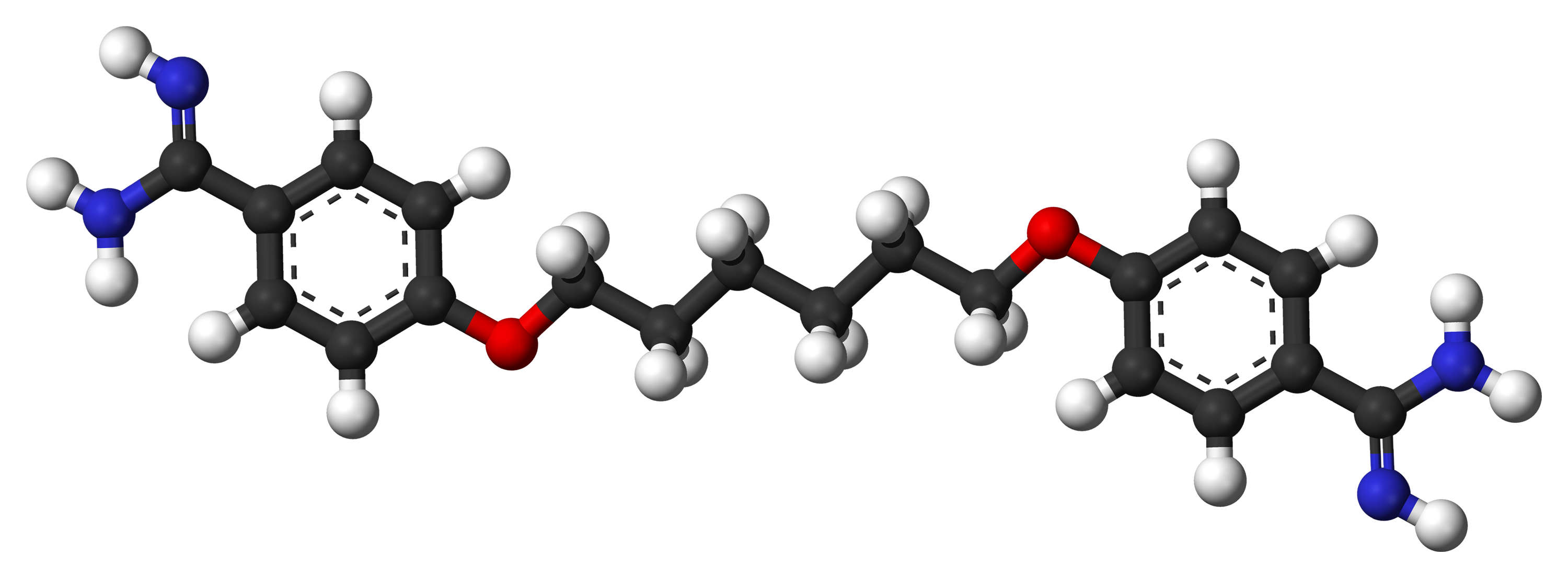
- Ball-and-stick model

Names
- Preferred IUPAC name 4,4′-[Hexane-1,6-diylbis(oxy)]di(benzene-1-carboximidamide)
- Other names 4-[6-(4-carbamimidoylphenoxy)hexoxy]benzamidine

Identifiers
CAS Number	3811-75-4
3D model (JSmol)	Interactive image
ChEBI	CHEBI:87184
ChEMBL	ChEMBL25105
ChemSpider	58639
DrugBank	DB03808
PubChem CID	65130
UNII	3483C2H13H
CompTox Dashboard (EPA)	DTXSID60191524
- InChI: InChI=1S/C20H26N4O2/c21-19(22)15-5-9-17(10-6-15)25-13-3-1-2-4-14-26-18-11-7-16(8-12-18)20(23)24/h5-12H,1-4,13-14H2,(H3,21,22)(H3,23,24) Key: OQLKNTOKMBVBKV-UHFFFAOYSA-N; InChI=1/C20H26N4O2/c21-19(22)15-5-9-17(10-6-15)25-13-3-1-2-4-14-26-18-11-7-16(8-12-18)20(23)24/h5-12H,1-4,13-14H2,(H3,21,22)(H3,23,24) Key: OQLKNTOKMBVBKV-UHFFFAOYAW
- SMILES: O(c1ccc(cc1)C(=[N@H])N)CCCCCCOc2ccc(C(=[N@H])N)cc2

Properties
Chemical formula	C_{20}H_{26}N_{4}O_{2}
Molar mass	354.446

Pharmacology
ATC code	D08AC04 (WHO) R01AX07 (WHO) R02AA18 (WHO) S01AX08 (WHO) S03AA05 (WHO)
- Except where otherwise noted, data are given for materials in their standard state (at 25 °C [77 °F], 100 kPa). verify (what is ?) Infobox references

Hexamidine is an antiseptic and a disinfectant. Hexomedine is the trade name of a diisethionate solution (1/1.000) of hexamidine. Hexamidine is used primarily as its diisethionate salt, which is more water-soluble than the dihydrochloride. The dihydrochloride was first synthesized and patented as a trypanocide for May & Baker in 1939. Its amoebicidal properties emerged in the 1990s. The exact mechanism of its biocidal action is unknown, but presumed similar to quaternary ammonium compounds, involving binding to the negatively charged lipid membranes of pathogens. Hexamidine and its shorter congener, propamidine, are used as antiseptics and preservatives in pharmaceuticals and cosmetics. They are particularly used for the topical treatment of acanthamoebiasis (Acanthamoeba keratitis).
