= Polyhexanide =

Pharmaceutical compound

Names
- Other names Polyhexamethylene biguanide; Polyhexamethylene guanide; Poly(iminoimidocarbonyl-iminoimidocarbonyl-iminohexamethylene) Hydrochloride; Poly(hexamethylenebiguanide); Polihexanide; Akantior; Lavasept; Tebasept; Prontosan

Identifiers
CAS Number	28757-47-3; 32289-58-0 (HCl)
Abbreviations	PHMB
ChEBI	CHEBI:149520
ChemSpider	none
KEGG	D08399; D13228
UNII	322U039GMF; 4XI6112496 (HCl)
CompTox Dashboard (EPA)	DTXSID7041099

Properties
Chemical formula	(C_{8}H_{17}N_{5})_{n}

Pharmacology
ATC code	D08AC05 (WHO) S01AX24 (WHO)
Legal status	EU: Rx-only

Hazards
- GHS labelling
Pictograms	(GHS09: Environmental hazard) (GHS08: Health hazard) (GHS06: Toxic) (GHS05: Corrosive) (GHS07: Exclamation mark)
Signal word	Danger
Hazard statements	H302, H317, H318, H330, H351, H372, H410
- Except where otherwise noted, data are given for materials in their standard state (at 25 °C [77 °F], 100 kPa). verify (what is ?) Infobox references

Polyhexanide (polyhexamethylene biguanide, PHMB) is a polymer used as a disinfectant and antiseptic. In dermatological use, it is spelled polihexanide (INN) and sold under various brand names. PHMB has been shown to be effective against Pseudomonas aeruginosa, Staphylococcus aureus, Escherichia coli, Candida albicans, Aspergillus brasiliensis, enterococci, and Klebsiella pneumoniae. Polihexanide, sold under the brand name Akantior is a medication used for the treatment of Acanthamoeba keratitis.

Products containing PHMB are used for inter-operative irrigation, pre- and post-surgery skin and mucous membrane disinfection, post-operative dressings, surgical and non-surgical wound dressings, surgical bath/hydrotherapy, chronic wounds like diabetic foot ulcer and burn wound management, routine antisepsis during minor incisions, catheterization, first aid, surface disinfection, and linen disinfection. PHMB eye drops have been used as a treatment for eyes affected by Acanthamoeba keratitis. Ready-to-use preparations for direct application in or on the human body in clinical use: Lavanid, Lavasept, Prontoderm, Prontomed, Prontosan, Serasept, Suprasorb X+PHMB und Suprasorb P+PHMB

It is sold as a swimming pool and spa disinfectant in place of chlorine or bromine based products under the name Baquacil.

PHMB is also used as an ingredient in some contact lens cleaning products, cosmetics, personal deodorants and some veterinary products. It is also used to treat clothing (Purista), purportedly to prevent the development of unpleasant odors.

The PHMB hydrochloride salt (solution) is used in the majority of formulations.

== Use in Acanthamoeba keratitis treatment ==
Polihexanide is indicated for the treatment of Acanthamoeba keratitis in people aged 12 years of age and older.

=== Legal status ===
In May 2024, the Committee for Medicinal Products for Human Use of the European Medicines Agency adopted a positive opinion, recommending the granting of a marketing authorization for the medicinal product Akantior, intended for the treatment of Acanthamoeba keratitis, a severe, progressive and sight threatening corneal infection characterized by intense pain and photophobia. Acanthamoeba keratitis is a rare disease primarily affecting contact lens wearers. The applicant for this medicinal product is SIFI SPA. Polihexanide was approved for medical use in the European Union in August 2024.

== Safety ==
In 2011, polyhexamethylene biguanide was classified as category 2 carcinogen by the European Chemical Agency, but it is still allowed in cosmetics in small quantities if exposure by inhalation is impossible.

== Name controversy ==
In some sources, particularly when listed as a cosmetics ingredient (INCI), the polymer is wrongly named as polyaminopropyl biguanide.
