= Dibrompropamidine =

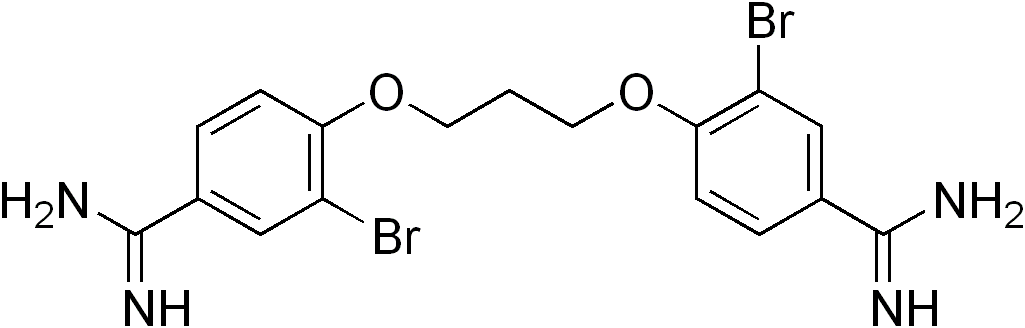

Names
- Preferred IUPAC name 4,4′-[Propane-1,3-diylbis(oxy)]bis(3-bromobenzene-1-carboximidamide)

Identifiers
CAS Number	496-00-4
3D model (JSmol)	Interactive image; Interactive image
ChEMBL	ChEMBL30044
ChemSpider	11479
KEGG	D07204
PubChem CID	11974
UNII	269M3QL74S
CompTox Dashboard (EPA)	DTXSID90197918
- InChI: InChI=1S/C17H18Br2N4O2/c18-12-8-10(16(20)21)2-4-14(12)24-6-1-7-25-15-5-3-11(17(22)23)9-13(15)19/h2-5,8-9H,1,6-7H2,(H3,20,21)(H3,22,23) Key: GMJFVGRUYJHMCO-UHFFFAOYSA-N; InChI=1/C17H18Br2N4O2/c18-12-8-10(16(20)21)2-4-14(12)24-6-1-7-25-15-5-3-11(17(22)23)9-13(15)19/h2-5,8-9H,1,6-7H2,(H3,20,21)(H3,22,23) Key: GMJFVGRUYJHMCO-UHFFFAOYAF
- SMILES: C1=CC(=C(C=C1C(=N)N)Br)OCCCOC2=C(C=C(C=C2)C(=N)N)Br; Brc2cc(ccc2OCCCOc1ccc(C(=[N@H])N)cc1Br)C(=[N@H])N

Properties
Chemical formula	C_{17}H_{18}Br_{2}N_{4}O_{2}
Molar mass	470.16 g/mol

Pharmacology
ATC code	D08AC01 (WHO) S01AX14 (WHO)
- Except where otherwise noted, data are given for materials in their standard state (at 25 °C [77 °F], 100 kPa). verify (what is ?) Infobox references

Dibrompropamidine is an antiseptic and disinfectant. As dibrompropamidine isethionate, it is used in eyedrops and ointment for the treatment of minor eye and eyelid infections in adults and children. In the UK, such preparations are sold under the brand names Brolene (Aventis Pharma), Golden Eye (Typharm Ltd), and Brulidine (Manx Healthcare).

== Characteristics ==
Dibrompropamidine is a white or almost white crystalline powder. It is odourless or almost odourless. Dibrompropamidine is freely soluble in water, soluble in glycerol, sparingly soluble in ethanol (96%), and practically insoluble in chloroform, in ether, in liquid paraffin and in fixed oils.
