= Twisted intercalating nucleic acid =

Biological molecule

Twisted intercalating nucleic acid (TINA) is a nucleic acid molecule that, when added to triplex-forming oligonucleotides (TFOs), stabilizes Hoogsteen triplex DNA formation from double-stranded DNA (dsDNA) and TFOs. Its ability to twist around a triple bond increases ease of intercalation within double stranded DNA in order to form triplex DNA. Certain configurations have been shown to stabilize Watson-Crick antiparallel duplex DNA. TINA-DNA primers have been shown to increase the specificity of binding in PCR. The use of TINA insertions in G-quadruplexes has also been shown to enhance anti-HIV-1 activity. TINA stabilized PT demonstrates improved sensitivity and specificity of DNA based clinical diagnostic assays.

== Triplex DNA ==
Triple helixes are formed when a single-stranded triplex-forming oligonucleotide (TFO) binds to a purine-containing strand of dsDNA through specific major groove interactions. Generally, the third-strand affinity of a TFO is low, due to the requirement for the formation of pH-sensitive C+–G–C Hoogsteen base triplexes under physiological conditions in the parallel (pyrimidine) binding motif. Modification of TFOs has been attempted in order to improve their binding affinities to their targets and to lessen restrictions in the dsDNA sequence with the design of new triplex nucleobases. Recently, it has been found that bulge insertions of (R)-1-O-[4-(1-pyrenylethynyl)phenylmethyl]glycerol (TINA) into the middle of homopyrimidine oligodeoxynucleotides can give rise to thermal stability in Hoogsteen-type triplexes and duplexes, whereas Watson–Crick-type duplexes of the same nucleotide content were destabilized. To increase ∆Tm, base mismatches should be placed in the center of the TFO and when feasible, A, C or T to G base mismatches should be avoided. Base mismatches can be neutralized by intercalation of a TINA on each side of the base mismatch and masked by a TINA intercalating direct 3'or 5' of it.

== Applications ==
=== Assay specificity ===
Diagnostic assays using DNA hybridization are limited by the dissociation of antiparallel duplex helices. This can be improved by using DNA stabilizing molecules such as intercalators like ortho-TINA, which will stabilize the duplex formation. Studies show that the greatest increase in stability occurred when intercalating primers were used at the 3’ and 5’ ends. Placement of a TINA molecule in the oligonucleotide is capable of improving the analytical sensitivity of the probe hybridization. Para-TINA molecules decreases Tm in all positions especially when at the center of the oligonucleotide, while in the ortho-TINA molecules, the improvement was seen anywhere with neutralization at the center. Combination of terminal para- or ortho- molecule with an internal TINA molecule showed the highest increase of Tm. TINA molecules should be placed terminally for maximum increase in Tm. An increase in Tm increases the specificity of assays, like PCR.

=== Anti-HIV-1 activity ===
Recent studies show that the use of TINA insertions in G-quadruplexes has also been shown to enhance anti-HIV-1 activity. In such studies, two G quadruplexes forming sequences which exhibit anti-HIV-1 activity on cell lines were modified using locked nucleic acid (LNA) or insertions of TINA. Incorporation of this provides as much as 8-fold improvement of anti-HIV-1 activity and the introduction of 5’ phosphate was shown to inhibit the dimerization of G-quadruplex. Many antiviral quadruplexes forming oligonucleotides formed more thermally stable G-quadruplexes and also high-order G quadruplex structures, which may be responsible for antiviral activity observed.

=== Therapeutic applications ===
TFOs hold promise in anti-gene therapy, due to their high sequence specificity. However, the potassium levels in vivo promote TFOs to form G-quartet structures singularly, preventing the TFOS from interacting in a triplex formation and decreasing the effectiveness TFO cell therapies. However, as shown by Paramasivam et al., bulge insertions of (R)-1-O-[4-(1-pyrenylethynyl)phenylmethyl]glycerol (TINA) into TFOs with high guanine concentrations greatly decreases the presence of self-association via potassium. TINA-TFOs, then, may be used in the future to target the genome in vivo and perform genome manipulation toward a therapeutic end. The use of purine TINA-TFOs holds specific promise as antigene molecules toward the KRAS proto-oncogene.
