= Intercalation (biochemistry) =

Insertion of molecules between DNA

Intercalation induces structural distortions. Left: unchanged DNA strand. Right: DNA strand intercalated at three locations (black areas).

In biochemistry, intercalation is the insertion of molecules between the planar bases of deoxyribonucleic acid (DNA). This process is used as a method for analyzing DNA and it is also the basis of certain kinds of poisoning.

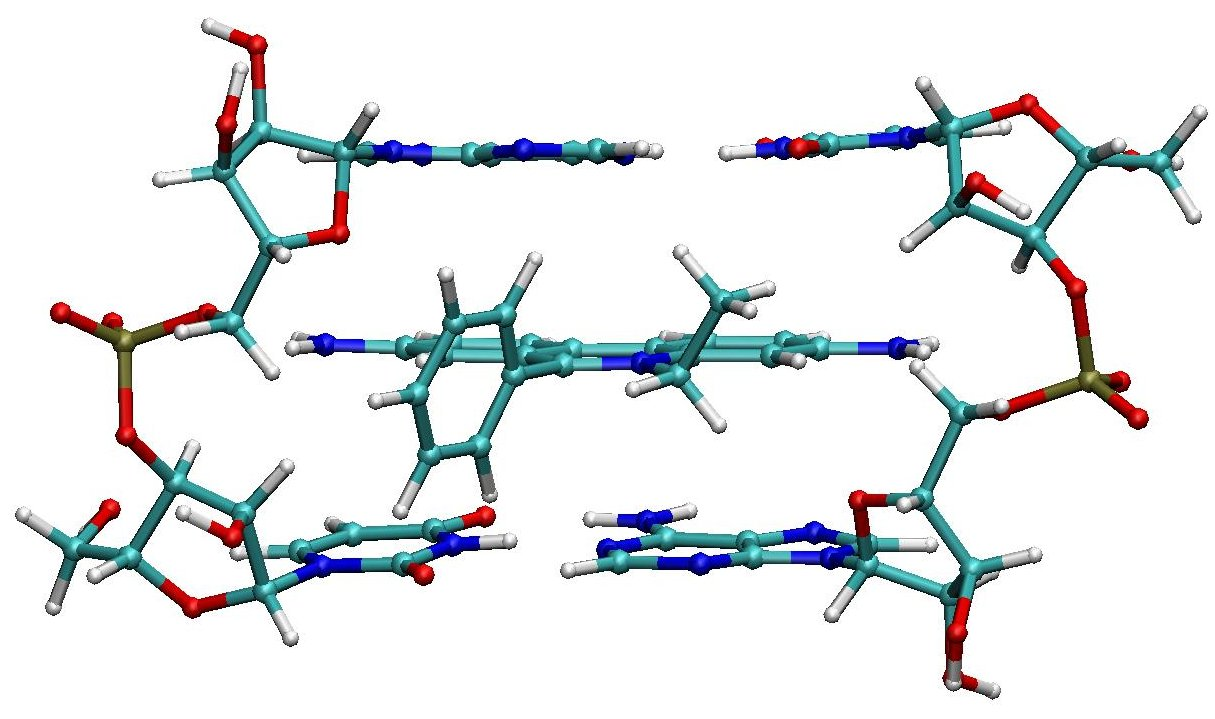
Ethidium intercalated between two adenine-thymine base pairs.

There are several ways molecules (in this case, also known as ligands) can interact with DNA. Ligands may interact with DNA by covalently binding, electrostatically binding, or intercalating. Intercalation occurs when ligands of an appropriate size and chemical nature fit themselves in between base pairs of DNA. These ligands are mostly polycyclic, aromatic, and planar, and therefore often make good nucleic acid stains. Intensively studied DNA intercalators include berberine, ethidium bromide, proflavine, daunomycin, doxorubicin, and thalidomide. DNA intercalators are used in chemotherapeutic treatment to inhibit DNA replication in rapidly growing cancer cells. Examples include doxorubicin (adriamycin) and daunorubicin (both of which are used in treatment of Hodgkin's lymphoma), and dactinomycin (used in Wilm's tumour, Ewing's Sarcoma, rhabdomyosarcoma).

Metallointercalators are complexes of a metal cation with polycyclic aromatic ligands. The most commonly used metal ion is ruthenium(II), because its complexes are very slow to decompose in the biological environment. Other metallic cations that have been used include rhodium(III) and iridium(III). Typical ligands attached to the metal ion are dipyridine and terpyridine whose planar structure is ideal for intercalation.

Base pairs in DNA must separate to admit the intercalator. The separation is achieved by unwinding. For example, ethidium unwinds DNA by about 26°, whereas proflavine unwinds it by about 17°. This unwinding causes the base pairs to separate, or "rise", creating an opening of about 0.34 nm (3.4 Å). Similarly, in the case of the intercalation of thiazole orange derivatives, the distance between the base pairs increased significantly, from ca. 4.7 Å to ca, 6.9. This unwinding induces local structural changes to the DNA strand, such as lengthening of the DNA strand or twisting of the base pairs. These structural modifications can lead to functional changes, often to the inhibition of transcription and replication and DNA repair processes, which makes intercalators potent mutagens. For this reason, DNA intercalators are often carcinogenic, such as the exo (but not the endo) 8,9 epoxide of aflatoxin B_{1} and acridines such as proflavine or quinacrine.

Intercalation as a mechanism of interaction between cationic, planar, polycyclic aromatic systems of the correct size (on the order of a base pair) was first proposed by Leonard Lerman in 1961. One proposed mechanism of intercalation is as follows: In aqueous isotonic solution, the cationic intercalator is attracted electrostatically to the surface of the polyanionic DNA. The ligand displaces a sodium and/or magnesium cation present in the "condensation cloud" of such cations that surrounds DNA (to partially balance the sum of the negative charges carried by each phosphate oxygen), thus forming a weak electrostatic association with the outer surface of DNA. From this position, the ligand diffuses along the surface of the DNA and may slide into the hydrophobic environment found between two base pairs that may transiently "open" to form an intercalation site, allowing the ethidium to move away from the hydrophilic (aqueous) environment surrounding the DNA and into the intercalation site. The base pairs transiently form such openings due to energy absorbed during collisions with solvent molecules.

== See also ==
- Anthracycline
- Intercalation (chemistry)
- Molecular tweezers
- Twisted intercalating nucleic acid
