= Octenidine dihydrochloride =

Surfactant

Names
- IUPAC name 1,1′-(Decane-1,10-diyl)bis(N-octylpyridin-4(1H)-imine)—hydrogen chloride (1/2)
- Other names N,N′-(decane-1,10-diyldi-1(4H)-pyridyl-4-ylidene)bis(octylammonium) dichloride

Identifiers
CAS Number	70775-75-6; Octenidine: 71251-02-0
3D model (JSmol)	Interactive image
ChEBI	CHEBI:478961
ChEMBL	ChEMBL36342
ChemSpider	46370
ECHA InfoCard	100.068.035
EC Number	274-861-8
PubChem CID	198481
UNII	U84956NU4B; Octenidine: OZE0372S5A
CompTox Dashboard (EPA)	DTXSID90221025
- InChI: InChI=1S/C36H62N4.2ClH/c1-3-5-7-9-15-19-27-37-35-23-31-39(32-24-35)29-21-17-13-11-12-14-18-22-30-40-33-25-36(26-34-40)38-28-20-16-10-8-6-4-2;;/h23-26,31-34H,3-22,27-30H2,1-2H3;2*1H Key: SMGTYJPMKXNQFY-UHFFFAOYSA-N; InChI=1/C36H62N4.2ClH/c1-3-5-7-9-15-19-27-37-35-23-31-39(32-24-35)29-21-17-13-11-12-14-18-22-30-40-33-25-36(26-34-40)38-28-20-16-10-8-6-4-2;;/h23-26,31-34H,3-22,27-30H2,1-2H3;2*1H
- SMILES: CCCCCCCCN=C1C=CN(C=C1)CCCCCCCCCCN2C=CC(=NCCCCCCCC)C=C2.Cl.Cl

Properties
Chemical formula	C_{36}H_{64}Cl_{2}N_{4}
Molar mass	623.84 g·mol^{−1}

Pharmacology
ATC code	R02AA21 (WHO) A01AB24 (WHO), QA01AB24 (WHO), combination codes: D08AJ57 (WHO), G01AX66 (WHO)
Legal status	EU: Rx-only
- Except where otherwise noted, data are given for materials in their standard state (at 25 °C [77 °F], 100 kPa). Infobox references

Octenidine dihydrochloride is a cationic surfactant, with a gemini-surfactant structure, derived from 4-aminopyridine. It is active against Gram-positive and Gram-negative bacteria. Since 1987, it has been used primarily in Europe as an antiseptic prior to medical procedures, including on neonates.

== Medical uses ==
Since 1987, octenidine has been used in Europe as an antiseptic, in concentrations of 0.1 to 2.0%. It is a substitute for chlorhexidine, with respect to its slow action and concerns about the carcinogenic impurity 4-chloroaniline. Octenidine preparations are less expensive than chlorhexidine and no resistance had been observed as of 2007. They may contain the antiseptic phenoxyethanol. It is not listed in the Annex V of authorized preservatives of the European Cosmetic Regulation 1223/2009.

== Efficacy ==
Octenidine dihydrochloride is active against Gram-positive and Gram-negative bacteria.

In vitro suspension tests with 5 minute exposure time have shown that octenidine requires lower effective concentrations than chlorhexidine to kill common bacteria like Staphylococcus aureus, Escherichia coli, Proteus mirabilis and the yeast Candida albicans.

Comparison between octenidine and chlorhexidine determined by the suspension test after 5 minutes of exposure.
	Effective concentration, %	
	Octenidine dihydrochloride	Chlorhexidine digluconate
Staphylococcus aureus	0.025	>0.2
Escherichia coli	0.025	0.1
Proteus mirabilis	0.025	>0.2
Candida albicans	0.01	0.025
Pseudomonas aeruginosa	0.025	>0.2

An observational study of using octenidine on the skin of patients in 17 intensive care units in Berlin in 2014 showed decreasing nosocomial infection rates.

In a survey of German neonatal intensive-care units octenidine without phenoxyethanol and octenidine were the most common skin antiseptics used for intensive-care procedures. Skin complications included blistering, necrosis and scarring, which has not been previously reported in this population.

In a 2016 study of pediatric cancer patients with long-term central venous access devices using octenidine/isopropanol for the disinfection of catheter hubs and 3-way stopcocks as part of a bundled intervention, the risk of bloodstream infections decreased.

== Safety ==
In a 2016 in vitro study of mouth rinses on gingival fibroblasts and epithelial cells octenidine showed a less cytotoxic effect, especially on epithelial cells, compared to chlorhexidine after 15 min. Wound irrigation with octenidine has caused severe complications in dogs, aseptic necrosis and chronic inflammation in penetrating hand wounds in humans.

== Synthesis ==

The secondary amine (3) is formed by reaction of octan-1-amine (1) and 4-bromopyridine (2). Treatment of this with 1,10-dichlorodecane (4) yields octenidine as its dihydrochloride salt.
