= Polynoxylin =

Chemical compound

Clinical data
- Routes of administration: Topical
- ATC code: A01AB05 (WHO) D01AE05 (WHO)

Identifiers
- IUPAC name: (poly) methylene-N,N'-bis(hydroxymethyl)urea
- CAS Number: 9011-05-6
- ChemSpider: none
- UNII: E18NBG5EEY
- KEGG: D07067
- CompTox Dashboard (EPA): DTXSID10905739 DTXSID00891874, DTXSID10905739
- ECHA InfoCard: 100.108.096

Chemical and physical data
- Formula: (C_{4}H_{8}N_{2}O_{3})_{n}

Polynoxylin (trade name Anaflex in Egypt) is an antiseptic for local treatment of the skin and the mouth. It is a formaldehyde releasing antimicrobial polymer.
