= Benzoxonium chloride =

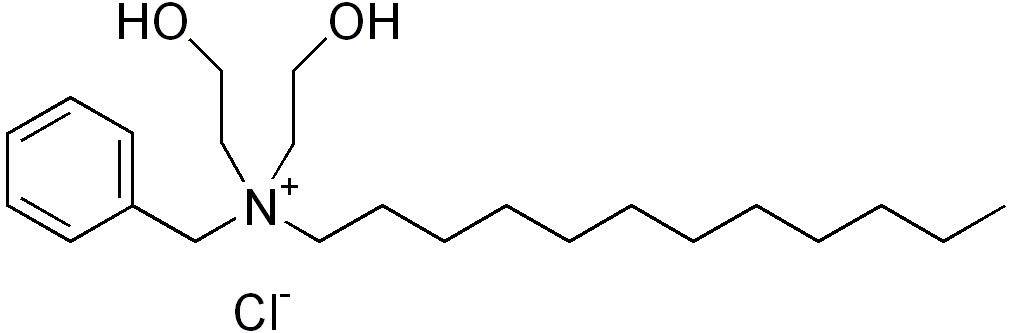

Names
- Preferred IUPAC name N-Benzyl-N,N-bis(2-hydroxyethyl)dodecan-1-aminium chloride
- Other names benzyl-dodecyl-bis(2-hydroxyethyl)ammonium chloride

Identifiers
CAS Number	19379-90-9
3D model (JSmol)	Interactive image
ChEMBL	ChEMBL2104255
ChemSpider	27483
ECHA InfoCard	100.039.083
PubChem CID	29563
UNII	12IMO9R11X
CompTox Dashboard (EPA)	DTXSID3041906
- InChI: InChI=1S/C23H42NO2.ClH/c1-2-3-4-5-6-7-8-9-10-14-17-24(18-20-25,19-21-26)22-23-15-12-11-13-16-23;/h11-13,15-16,25-26H,2-10,14,17-22H2,1H3;1H/q+1;/p-1 Key: UUSQFLGKGQEVCM-UHFFFAOYSA-M; InChI=1/C23H42NO2.ClH/c1-2-3-4-5-6-7-8-9-10-14-17-24(18-20-25,19-21-26)22-23-15-12-11-13-16-23;/h11-13,15-16,25-26H,2-10,14,17-22H2,1H3;1H/q+1;/p-1 Key: UUSQFLGKGQEVCM-REWHXWOFAC
- SMILES: [Cl-].OCC[N+](CCO)(Cc1ccccc1)CCCCCCCCCCCC

Properties
Chemical formula	C_{23}H_{42}ClNO_{2}
Molar mass	400.04 g·mol^{−1}

Pharmacology
ATC code	A01AB14 (WHO) D08AJ05 (WHO)
- Except where otherwise noted, data are given for materials in their standard state (at 25 °C [77 °F], 100 kPa). verify (what is ?) Infobox references

Benzoxonium chloride (Absonal) is an antiseptic and disinfectant.
