= Chlorquinaldol =

Names
- Preferred IUPAC name 5,7-Dichloro-2-methylquinolin-8-ol
- Other names Anginazol; Lacoid, Nerisone

Identifiers
CAS Number	72-80-0
3D model (JSmol)	Interactive image
ChEBI	CHEBI:74500
ChEMBL	ChEMBL224325
ChemSpider	6062
ECHA InfoCard	100.000.718
KEGG	D07208
PubChem CID	6301
UNII	D6VHC87LLS
CompTox Dashboard (EPA)	DTXSID3048998
- InChI: InChI=1S/C10H7Cl2NO/c1-5-2-3-6-7(11)4-8(12)10(14)9(6)13-5/h2-4,14H,1H3 Key: GPTXWRGISTZRIO-UHFFFAOYSA-N; InChI=1/C10H7Cl2NO/c1-5-2-3-6-7(11)4-8(12)10(14)9(6)13-5/h2-4,14H,1H3 Key: GPTXWRGISTZRIO-UHFFFAOYAU
- SMILES: Clc1c(O)c2nc(ccc2c(Cl)c1)C

Properties
Chemical formula	C_{10}H_{7}Cl_{2}NO
Molar mass	228.07 g/mol

Pharmacology
ATC code	D08AH02 (WHO) G01AC03 (WHO), P01AA04 (WHO), R02AA11 (WHO)
- Except where otherwise noted, data are given for materials in their standard state (at 25 °C [77 °F], 100 kPa). verify (what is ?) Infobox references

Chlorquinaldol is an antimicrobial agent and antiseptic. It is a chlorinated derivative of the popular chelating agent 8-hydroxyquinoline. It is applied topically as a cream and internally as a losenge.

It was marketed by Geigy as an intestinal antiseptic and amebicide with the trade name Siosteran.
