= Savlon =

Brand of antiseptic products

Savlon INN: Cetrimide and chlorhexidine gluconate
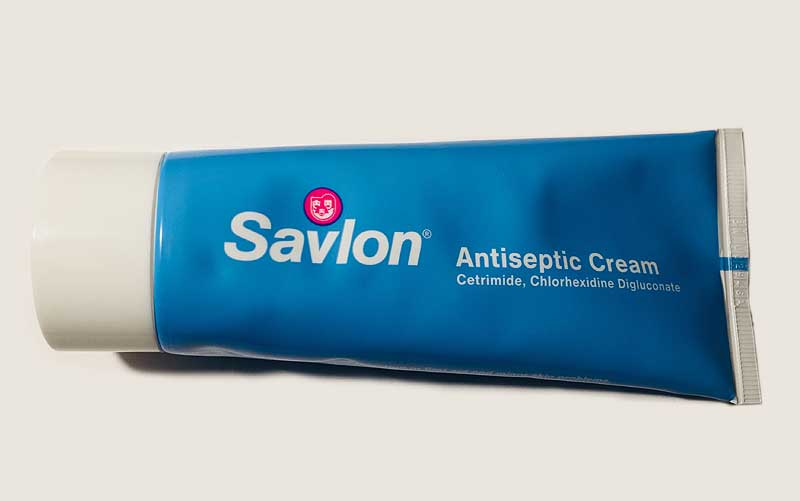

Combination of
- Cetrimide: Antiseptic
- Chlorhexidine gluconate: Antiseptic

Clinical data
- AHFS/Drugs.com: drugs.com/uk/savlon-antiseptic-cream-leaflet.html

Legal status
- Legal status: UK: General sales list (GSL, OTC)

Identifiers
- CAS Number: 37380-83-9

Savlon is a brand of antibacterial and antiseptic personal care products with the active ingredients of cetrimide and chlorhexidine gluconate. Commonly sold as a cream and in liquid form, the product range also includes antiseptic sprays, sticking plasters and other antiseptic products.

== History ==
The product name is derived from the original Imperial Chemical Industries (ICI) manufacturing site name of the Avlon Works at Avonmouth near Bristol, UK on the Severn Estuary.

Savlon is sold in many countries with different manufacturing and licensing agreements.

In 1992, Johnson & Johnson acquired the Savlon OTC brands from ICI. Since then, Johnson & Johnson manufactures and distributes Savlon products throughout Sub-Saharan Africa. Also in 1992, ICI sold its Bangladesh rights to Savlon to ICI Bangladesh Manufacturers Limited, now ACI Limited.

In Australia and New Zealand, Savlon was acquired by Reckitt Benckiser after its takeover of Boots Healthcare (International) in late 2005.

In 2015, Johnson & Johnson sold Indian rights to the Savlon and Shower To Shower brands to ITC Limited. Also in 2015, Johnson & Johnson sold the Taiwanese right of the brand to Mary & Majestic and THL Group.

In June 2019, STADA of Germany acquired UK rights to Savlon from GlaxoSmithKline Consumer Products for its UK subsidiary Thornton & Ross.

== Ownership by countries and regions ==
- Australia and New Zealand: Reckitt
- Bangladesh: ACI Limited
- India: ITC Limited
- (African Union) Sub-Saharan Africa: Johnson & Johnson
- Taiwan: jointly owned by Mary & Majestic and THL Group
- UK: Thornton & Ross, a subsidiary of STADA Arzneimittel AG

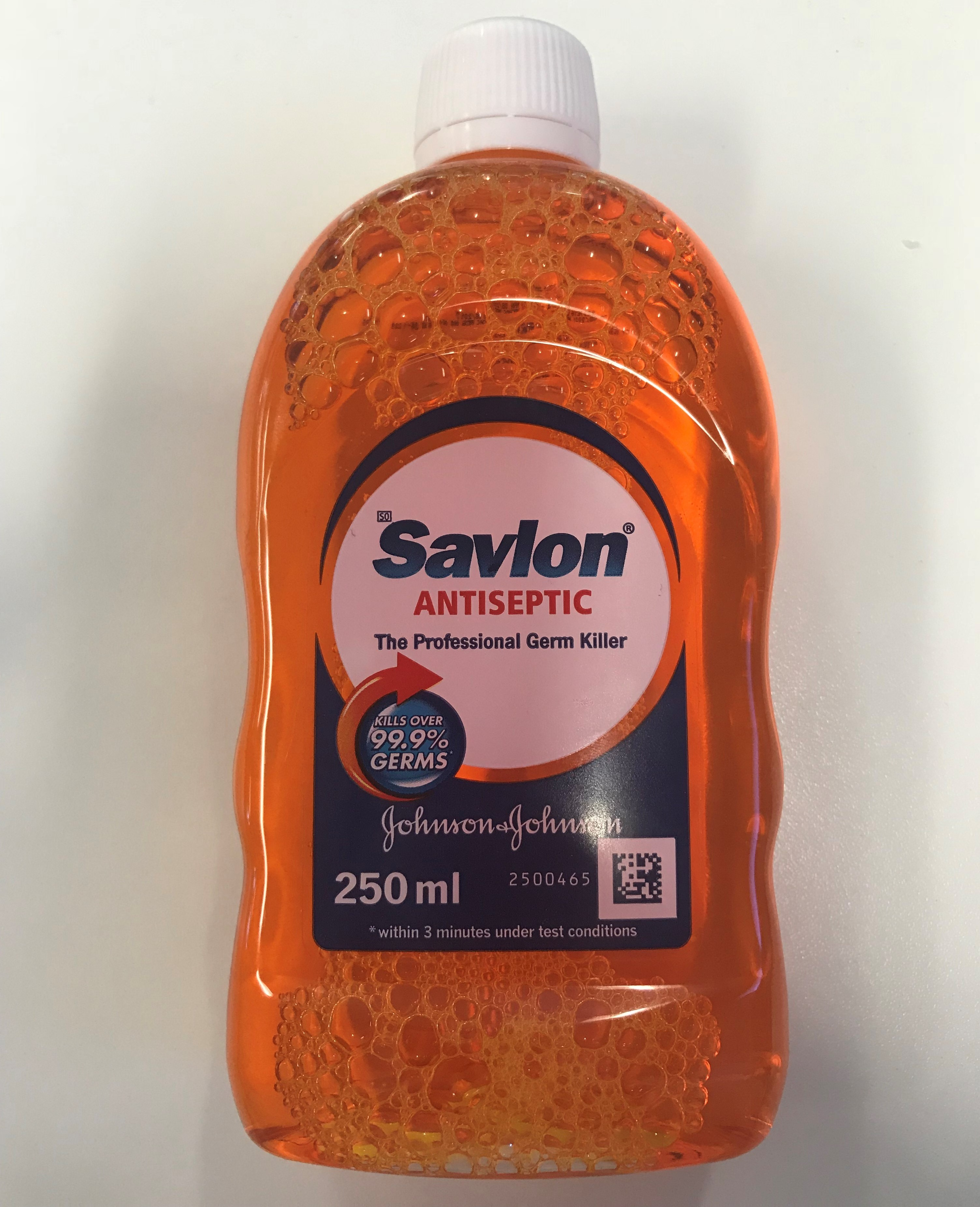
Savlon antiseptic liquid 250 ml flask.

== Formulation ==
The active ingredients in Savlon products are two antiseptics, cetrimide and chlorhexidine gluconate. These agents were discovered and first developed by Imperial Chemical Industries (ICI).

Savlon is commonly sold as an antiseptic liquid. It is used for cleansing and prevention of infection in skin lesions, including small cuts and blisters and minor burns, and is useful in first aid kits. Other items sold in the Savlon range include hygiene soap, antiseptic cream, and healing gel. Savlon's antiseptic liquid comes in the SKU sizes of 75 ml, 125 ml, 250 ml, 500 ml, 750 ml and 2 L.
