= Behentrimonium chloride =

Names
- Preferred IUPAC name N,N,N-Trimethyldocosan-1-aminium chloride
- Other names Docosyltrimethylammonium chloride, BTAC-228, docosyl-trimethylazanium chloride

Identifiers
CAS Number	17301-53-0
3D model (JSmol)	Interactive image
ChemSpider	2283212
ECHA InfoCard	100.037.554
PubChem CID	3014969
UNII	X7GNG3S47T
CompTox Dashboard (EPA)	DTXSID60884964
- InChI: InChI=1S/C25H54N.ClH/c1-5-6-7-8-9-10-11-12-13-14-15-16-17-18-19-20-21-22-23-24-25-26(2,3)4;/h5-25H2,1-4H3;1H/q+1;/p-1 Key: YSJGOMATDFSEED-UHFFFAOYSA-M; InChI=1/C25H54N.ClH/c1-5-6-7-8-9-10-11-12-13-14-15-16-17-18-19-20-21-22-23-24-25-26(2,3)4;/h5-25H2,1-4H3;1H/q+1;/p-1 Key: YSJGOMATDFSEED-REWHXWOFAO
- SMILES: [Cl-].C(CCCC[N+](C)(C)C)CCCCCCCCCCCCCCCCC

Properties
Chemical formula	C_{25}H_{54}ClN
Molar mass	404.16 g·mol^{−1}
- Except where otherwise noted, data are given for materials in their standard state (at 25 °C [77 °F], 100 kPa). verify (what is ?) Infobox references

Behentrimonium chloride, also known as docosyltrimethylammonium chloride or BTAC-228, is a yellow waxlike organic compound with chemical formula CH_{3}(CH_{2})_{21}N(Cl)(CH_{3})_{3}, used as an antistatic agent and, sometimes, a disinfectant. It is commonly found in cosmetics such as conditioners, hair dye, and mousse, and also in detergents. Laboratory tests have indicated that it does readily biodegrade.

== See also ==
- Cetrimonium bromide – a C_{19} structural analogue
- Cetrimonium chloride – a C_{19} structural analogue
