= Tibezonium iodide =

Chemical compound

Clinical data
- AHFS/Drugs.com: International Drug Names
- Routes of administration: Topical (mouth)
- ATC code: A01AB15 (WHO)

Identifiers
- IUPAC name: N,N-diethyl-N-methyl-2-(2-[4-(phenylthio)phenyl]-1H-benzo[b][1,4]diazepin-4-ylthio)ethanaminium iodide
- CAS Number: 54663-47-7
- PubChem CID: 6918582
- ChemSpider: 5293779
- UNII: E9P274AJEW
- KEGG: D02712
- CompTox Dashboard (EPA): DTXSID60905128
- ECHA InfoCard: 100.053.876

Chemical and physical data
- Formula: C_{28}H_{32}IN_{3}S_{2}
- Molar mass: 601.61 g·mol^{−1}
- 3D model (JSmol): Interactive image
- SMILES: [I-].N=3c4c(\N=C(\c2ccc(Sc1ccccc1)cc2)CC=3SCC[N+](CC)(CC)C)cccc4
- InChI: InChI=1S/C28H32N3S2.HI/c1-4-31(3,5-2)19-20-32-28-21-27(29-25-13-9-10-14-26(25)30-28)22-15-17-24(18-16-22)33-23-11-7-6-8-12-23;/h6-18H,4-5,19-21H2,1-3H3;1H/q+1;/p-1; Key:YTSPICCNZMNDQT-UHFFFAOYSA-M

Tibezonium iodide (or tibenzonium iodide) is an antiseptic for use in the mouth. It is a salt consisting of a lipophilic quaternary ammonium cation and iodide as the counterion.
