= Cetrimonium bromide =

Quaternary ammonium surfactant and antiseptic agent

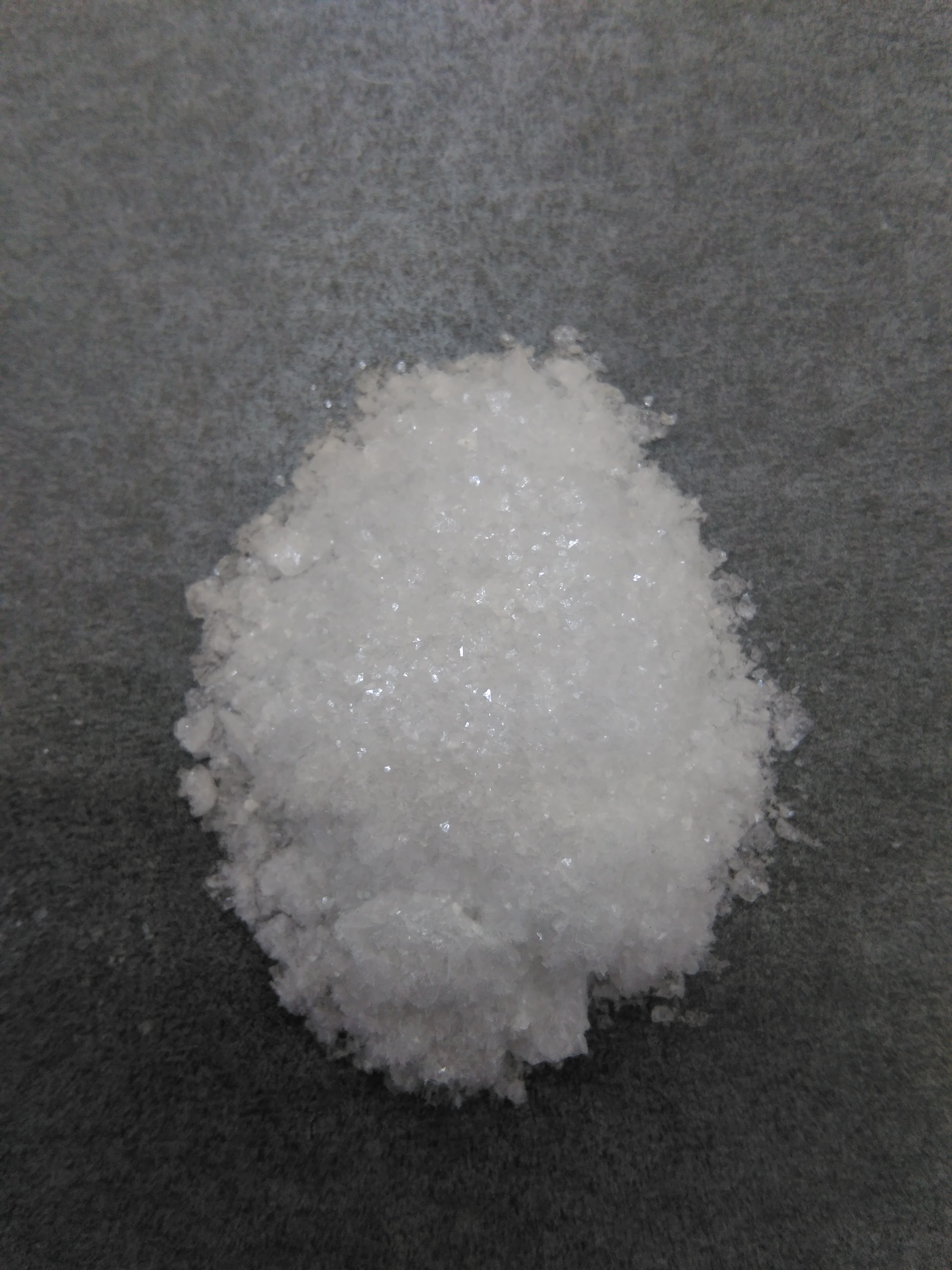

Names
- Preferred IUPAC name N,N,N-Trimethylhexadecan-1-aminium bromide
- Other names: Cetyltrimethylammonium bromide; CTAB; Hexadecyltrimethylammonium bromide

Identifiers
CAS Number	57-09-0
3D model (JSmol)	Interactive image
ChEBI	CHEBI:3567
ChEMBL	ChEMBL113150
ChemSpider	5754
ECHA InfoCard	100.000.283
KEGG	D03454
PubChem CID	5974
UNII	L64N7M9BWR
CompTox Dashboard (EPA)	DTXSID5037028
- InChI: InChI=1S/C19H42N.BrH/c1-5-6-7-8-9-10-11-12-13-14-15-16-17-18-19-20(2,3)4;/h5-19H2,1-4H3;1H/q+1;/p-1 Key: LZZYPRNAOMGNLH-UHFFFAOYSA-M; InChI=1/C19H42N.BrH/c1-5-6-7-8-9-10-11-12-13-14-15-16-17-18-19-20(2,3)4;/h5-19H2,1-4H3;1H/q+1;/p-1 Key: LZZYPRNAOMGNLH-REWHXWOFAU
- SMILES: CCCCCCCCCCCCCCCC[N+](C)(C)C.[Br-]

Properties
Chemical formula	C_{19}H_{42}BrN
Molar mass	364.45 g/mol
Appearance	white powder
Melting point	237 to 243 °C (459 to 469 °F; 510 to 516 K) (decomposes)

Pharmacology
ATC code	D08AJ02 (WHO)
- Except where otherwise noted, data are given for materials in their standard state (at 25 °C [77 °F], 100 kPa). verify (what is ?) Infobox references

Cetrimonium bromide, also known with the abbreviation CTAB, is a quaternary ammonium surfactant with a condensed structural formula [(C_{16}H_{33})N(CH_{3})_{3}]Br.

It is one of the components of the topical antiseptic cetrimide. The cetrimonium (hexadecyltrimethylammonium) cation is an effective antiseptic agent against bacteria and fungi. It is also one of the main components of some buffers for the extraction of DNA. It has been widely used in synthesis of gold nanoparticles (e.g., spheres, rods, bipyramids), mesoporous silica nanoparticles (e.g., MCM-41), and hair conditioning products. The closely related compounds cetrimonium chloride and cetrimonium stearate are also used as topical antiseptics and may be found in many household products such as shampoos and cosmetics. CTAB, due to its relatively high cost, is typically only used in select cosmetics.

As with most surfactants, CTAB forms micelles in aqueous solutions. At 303 K (30 °C) it forms micelles with aggregation number 75–120 (depending on method of determination; average ~95) and degree of ionization, α = 0.2–0.1 (fractional charge; from low to high concentration). The binding constant (K°) of Br^{−} counterion to a CTA^{+} micelle at 303 K (30 °C) is c. 400 M-1. This value is calculated from Br^{−} and CTA^{+} ion selective electrode measurements and conductometry data by using literature data for micelle size (r = ~3 nm), extrapolated to the critical micelle concentration of 1 mM. However, K° varies with total surfactant concentration so it is extrapolated to the point at which micelle concentration is zero.

== Applications ==
=== Biological ===
Cell lysis is a convenient tool to isolate certain macromolecules that exist primarily inside of the cell. Cell membranes consist of hydrophilic and lipophilic end-groups. Therefore, detergents are often used to dissolve these membranes since they interact with both polar and nonpolar end-groups. CTAB has emerged as the preferred choice for biological use because it maintains the integrity of precipitated DNA during its isolation. Cells typically have high concentrations of macromolecules, such as glycoproteins and polysaccharides, that co-precipitate with DNA during the extraction process, causing the extracted DNA to lose purity. The positive charge of the CTAB molecule allows it to denature these molecules, which would interfere with this isolation.

==== Medical ====
CTAB has been shown to have potential use as an apoptosis-promoting anticancer agent for head and neck cancer (HNC). In vitro, CTAB interacted additively with γ radiation and cisplatin, two standard HNC therapeutic agents. CTAB exhibited anticancer cytotoxicity against several HNC cell lines with minimal effects on normal fibroblasts, a selectivity that exploits cancer-specific metabolic aberrations. In vivo, CTAB ablated tumor-forming capacity of FaDu cells and delayed established tumor growth. Thus, this approach identified CTAB as a potential apoptogenic quaternary ammonium compound possessing in vitro and in vivo efficacy against HNC models. CTAB is also recommended by the World Health Organisation (WHO) as a purification agent in the downstream vaccine processing of polysaccharide vaccines.

==== Protein electrophoresis ====
Glycoproteins form broad, fuzzy bands in SDS-PAGE (Laemmli-electrophoresis) because of their broad distribution of negative charges. Using positively charged detergents such as CTAB will avoid issues associated with glycoproteins. Proteins can be blotted from CTAB-gels in analogy to western blots ("eastern blot"), and Myelin-associated high hydrophobic protein can be analyzed using CTAB 2-DE.

==== DNA extraction ====
CTAB is an essential surfactant in the DNA extraction buffer system that removes membrane lipids and promotes cell lysis. Separation is also successful when the tissue contains high amounts of polysaccharides. CTAB binds to the polysaccharides when the salt concentration is high, thus removing polysaccharides from the solution. A typical recipe can be to combine 100 mL of 1 M Tris HCl (pH 8.0), 280 mL 5 M NaCl, 40 mL of 0.5 M EDTA, and 20 g of CTAB then add double distilled water (ddH_{2}O) to bring total volume to 1 L.

== Nanoparticle synthesis ==
Surfactants play a key role in nanoparticle synthesis by adsorbing to the surface of the forming nanoparticle and lowering its surface energy. Surfactants also help to prevent aggregation (e.g. via DLVO mechanisms).

=== Au nanoparticle synthesis ===
Gold (Au) nanoparticles are interesting to researchers because of their unique properties that can be used in applications such as catalysis, optics, electronics, sensing, and medicine. Control of nanoparticle size and shape is important to tune its properties. CTAB has been a widely used reagent to impart stability to these nanoparticles and control their morphologies. CTAB may control nanoparticle size and shape by selectively or more strongly binding to various emerging crystal facets.

Some of this control originates from the reaction of CTAB with other reagents in the gold nanoparticle synthesis. For example, in aqueous gold nanoparticle syntheses, chlorauric acid (HAuCl_{4}) may react with CTAB to create a CTA^{+}-AuCl^{−}_{4} complex. The gold complex is then reacted with ascorbic acid to produce hydrochloric acid, an ascorbic acid radical, and CTA-AuCl_{3}. The ascorbic acid radical and CTA-AuCl_{3} react spontaneously to create metallic Au^{0} nanoparticles and other byproducts. An alternative or simultaneous reaction is the substitution of Cl^{−} with Br^{−} about the Au(III) center. Both complexation with the ammonium cation and/or speciation of the Au(III) precursor influence the kinetics of the nanoparticle formation reaction and therefore influence the size, shape, and (size and shape) distributions of the resulting particles.

However, CTA^{+}-AuCl^{−}_{4} should not be called a complex, electrostatic interaction of quaternary ammonium cation with AuCl^{−}_{4} results in formation of an ion pair at best. CTA^{+} does not have any donating centers which can form a coordination complex with Au(III) metal centers.

=== Mesoporous materials ===
CTAB is used as the template for the first report of ordered mesoporous materials. Microporous and mesoporous inorganic solids (with pore diameters of ≤20 Å and ~20–500 Å respectively) have found great utility as catalysts and sorption media because of their large internal surface area. Typical microporous materials are crystalline framework solids, such as zeolites, but the largest pore dimensions are still below 2 nm, which greatly limits application. Examples of mesoporous solids include silicas and modified layered materials. Still, these are invariably amorphous or paracrystalline, with pores that are irregularly spaced and broadly distributed in size. There is a need to prepare highly ordered mesoporous material with good mesoscale crystallinity. The synthesis of mesoporous solids from the calcination of aluminosilicate gels in the presence of surfactants was reported. The material possesses regular arrays of uniform channels, the dimensions of which can be tailored (in the range of 16 Å to >100 Å) through the choice of surfactant, auxiliary chemicals, and reaction conditions. It was proposed that these materials' formation occurs through a liquid-crystal 'templating' mechanism, in which the silicate material forms inorganic walls between ordered surfactant micelles. CTAB formed micelles in the solution, forming a two-dimensional hexagonal mesostructure. The silicon precursor hydrolysed between the micelles and finally filled the gap with silicon dioxide. The template could be further removed by calcination, leaving a pore structure behind. These pores mimicked precisely the structure of the mesoscale soft template and led to highly ordered mesoporous silica materials.

== Toxicity ==
CTAB has been used for applications in nanoparticle synthesis and cosmetics. Due to its use in human products and other applications, it is essential to be made aware of the hazards this agent contains. The Santa Cruz Biotechnology, Inc. offers a comprehensive MSDS for CTAB and should be referred to for additional questions or concerns. Animal testing has shown ingestion of less than 150 g of the agent can lead to adverse health effects or possibly death by CTAB causing chemical burns throughout the esophagus and gastrointestinal tract that can be followed by nausea and vomiting. If the substance continues through the gastrointestinal tract, it will be poorly absorbed in the intestines, followed by faecal excretion. Toxicity has also been tested on aquatic life including Brachydanio rerio (zebrafish) and Daphnia magna (water flea). Zebrafish showed CTAB toxicity when exposed to 0.3 mg/L for 96 hours, and water fleas showed CTAB toxicity when exposed to 0.03 mg/L for 48 hours.

CTAB and other quaternary ammonium salts have frequently been used in cosmetics at concentrations up to 10%. Cosmetics at that concentration must only be used as rinse-off types, such as shampoos. Other leave-on cosmetics are considered only safe at or below 0.25% concentrations. Injections into the body cavity of pregnant mice showed embryotoxic and teratogenic effects. Only teratogenic effects were seen with 10 mg/kg doses, while both effects were seen at 35 mg/kg doses. Oral doses of 50 mg/kg/day showed embryotoxic effects as well. Similar tests were completed by giving rats 10, 20, and 45 mg/kg/day of CTAB in their drinking water for one year. At the 10 and 20 mg/kg/day doses, the rats had no toxic symptoms. At the highest dose, the rats began experiencing weight loss. The weight loss in the male rats was attributed to less efficient food conversion. The tests showed no microscopic alterations to the gastrointestinal tract of the rats.

Other toxicity tests have been conducted using incubated human skin HaCaT keratinocyte cells. These human cells were incubated with gold nanorods synthesized using seed-mediated, surfactant-assisted growth of gold nanoparticles. Gold nanoparticles are shown to be nontoxic, however once the nanoparticles are put through the growth solutions, the newly formed nanorods are highly toxic. This large increase in toxicity is attributed to the CTAB that is used in the growth solutions to cause anisotropic growth. Experiments also showed the toxicity of bulk CTAB and the synthesized gold nanorods to be equivalent. Toxicity tests showed CTAB remaining toxic with concentrations as low as 10 μM. The human cells show CTAB being nontoxic at concentrations less than 1 μM. Without the use of CTAB in this synthesis, the gold nanorods are not stable; they break into nanoparticles or undergo aggregation.

The mechanism for cytotoxicity has not been extensively studied, but possible mechanisms have been proposed. One proposal showed two methods that led to the cytotoxicity in U87 and A172 glioblastoma cells. The first method showed CTAB exchanging with phospholipids, causing rearrangement of the membrane, allowing β-galactoside to enter into the cell by way of cavities. At low concentrations, there are not enough cavities to cause death to the cells, but with increasing the CTAB concentration, more phospholipids are displaced, causing more cavities in the membrane, leading to cell death. The second proposed method is based on the dissociation of CTAB into CTA^{+} and Br^{−} within the mitochondrial membrane. The positively charged CTA^{+} binds to the ATP synthase, not allowing H^{+} to bind, stopping the synthesis of ATP and resulting in cell death.

== See also ==
- Behentrimonium chloride – A C_{25} structural analogue
- Cetrimonium chloride – The corresponding chloride salt
