= ATC code R02 =

ATC code R02 Throat preparations is a therapeutic subgroup of the Anatomical Therapeutic Chemical Classification System, a system of alphanumeric codes developed by the World Health Organization (WHO) for the classification of drugs and other medical products. Subgroup R02 is part of the anatomical group R Respiratory system.

Codes for veterinary use (ATCvet codes) can be created by placing the letter Q in front of the human ATC code: for example, QR02.
National versions of the ATC classification may include additional codes not present in this list, which follows the WHO version.

== R02A Throat preparations ==
=== R02AA Antiseptics ===
R02AA01 Ambazone
R02AA02 Dequalinium
R02AA03 Dichlorobenzyl alcohol
R02AA05 Chlorhexidine
R02AA06 Cetylpyridinium
R02AA09 Benzethonium
R02AA10 Myristyl-benzalkonium
R02AA11 Chlorquinaldol
R02AA12 Hexylresorcinol
R02AA13 Acriflavinium chloride
R02AA14 Oxyquinoline
R02AA15 Povidone-iodine
R02AA16 Benzalkonium
R02AA17 Cetrimonium
R02AA18 Hexamidine
R02AA19 Phenol
R02AA20 Various
R02AA21 Octenidine

=== R02AB Antibiotics ===
R02AB01 Neomycin
R02AB02 Tyrothricin
R02AB03 Fusafungine
R02AB04 Bacitracin
R02AB30 Gramicidin

=== R02AD Anesthetics, local ===
R02AD01 Benzocaine
R02AD02 Lidocaine
R02AD03 Cocaine
R02AD04 Dyclonine
R02AD05 Ambroxol

=== R02AX Other throat preparations ===
R02AX01 Flurbiprofen
R02AX02 Ibuprofen
R02AX03 Benzydamine
