= ATC code D08 =

ATC code D08 Antiseptics and disinfectants is a therapeutic subgroup of the Anatomical Therapeutic Chemical Classification System, a system of alphanumeric codes developed by the World Health Organization (WHO) for the classification of drugs and other medical products. Subgroup D08 is part of the anatomical group D Dermatologicals.

Codes for veterinary use (ATCvet codes) can be created by placing the letter Q in front of the human ATC code: for example, QD08. ATCvet codes without corresponding human ATC codes are cited with the leading Q in the following list.
National versions of the ATC classification may include additional codes not present in this list, which follows the WHO version.

== D08A Antiseptics and disinfectants ==
=== D08AA Acridine derivatives ===
D08AA01 Ethacridine lactate
D08AA02 Aminoacridine
D08AA03 Euflavine
QD08AA99 Acridine derivatives, combinations

=== D08AC Biguanides and amidines ===
D08AC01 Dibrompropamidine
D08AC02 Chlorhexidine
D08AC03 Propamidine
D08AC04 Hexamidine
D08AC05 Polihexanide
D08AC52 Chlorhexidine, combinations
QD08AC54 Hexamidine, combinations

=== D08AE Phenol and derivatives ===
D08AE01 Hexachlorophene
D08AE02 Policresulen
D08AE03 Phenol
D08AE04 Triclosan
D08AE05 Chloroxylenol
D08AE06 Biphenylol
QD08AE99 Phenol and derivatives, combinations

=== D08AF Nitrofuran derivatives ===
D08AF01 Nitrofural

=== D08AG Iodine products ===
D08AG01 Iodine/octylphenoxypolyglycolether
D08AG02 Povidone-iodine
D08AG03 Iodine
D08AG04 Diiodohydroxypropane
QD08AG53 Iodine, combinations

=== D08AH Quinoline derivatives ===
D08AH01 Dequalinium
D08AH02 Chlorquinaldol
D08AH03 Oxyquinoline
D08AH30 Clioquinol

=== D08AJ Quaternary ammonium compounds ===
D08AJ01 Benzalkonium
D08AJ02 Cetrimonium
D08AJ03 Cetylpyridinium
D08AJ04 Cetrimide
D08AJ05 Benzoxonium chloride
D08AJ06 Didecyldimethylammonium chloride
D08AJ08 Benzethonium chloride
D08AJ10 Decamethoxine
D08AJ57 Octenidine, combinations
D08AJ58 Benzethonium chloride, combinations
D08AJ59 Dodeclonium bromide, combinations

=== D08AK Mercurial products ===
D08AK01 Mercuric amidochloride
D08AK02 Phenylmercuric borate
D08AK03 Mercuric chloride
D08AK04 Merbromin
D08AK05 Mercury, metallic
D08AK06 Thiomersal
D08AK30 Mercuric iodide
QD08AK52 Phenylmercuric borate, combinations

=== D08AL Silver compounds ===
D08AL01 Silver nitrate
D08AL30 Silver

=== D08AX Other antiseptics and disinfectants ===
D08AX01 Hydrogen peroxide
D08AX02 Eosin
D08AX03 Propanol
D08AX04 Tosylchloramide sodium
D08AX05 Isopropanol
D08AX06 Potassium permanganate
D08AX07 Sodium hypochlorite
D08AX08 Ethanol
D08AX53 Propanol, combinations
