= Acriflavine =

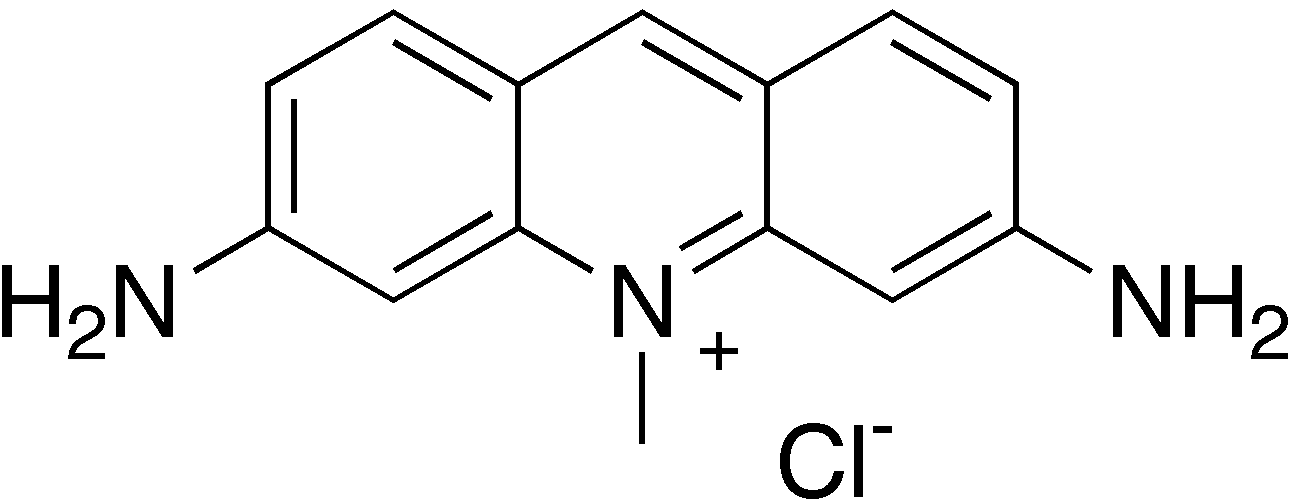
- Wireframe of acriflavine

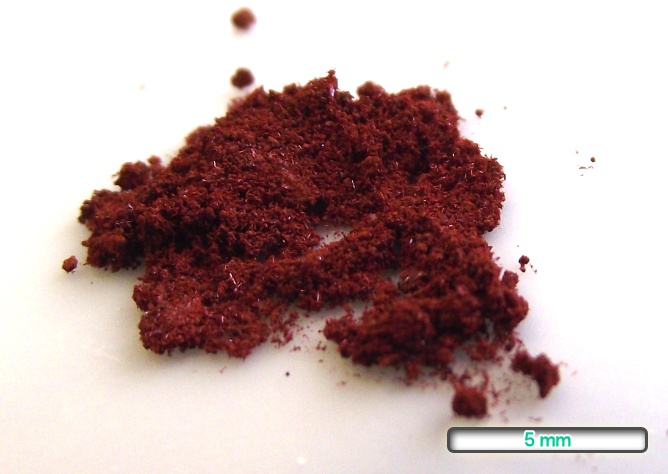
- Sample of pure acriflavine

Names
- Preferred IUPAC name 3,6-Diamino-10-methylacridin-10-ium chloride
- Other names Acriflavinium chloride (INN)

Identifiers
CAS Number	65589-70-0; 10597-46-3 (HCl)
3D model (JSmol)	Interactive image; Interactive image
ChEBI	CHEBI:383703
ChEMBL	ChEMBL354349
ChemSpider	391386; 21018 (HCl)
ECHA InfoCard	100.211.047
EC Number	201-668-8
PubChem CID	443101; 15558347 (HCl)
UNII	1T3A50395T; 1S73VW819C (HCl)
CompTox Dashboard (EPA)	DTXSID30988185 DTXSID4045848, DTXSID30988185
- InChI: InChI=1S/C14H13N3.ClH/c1-17-13-7-11(15)4-2-9(13)6-10-3-5-12(16)8-14(10)17;/h2-8H,1H3,(H3,15,16);1H Key: KKAJSJJFBSOMGS-UHFFFAOYSA-N; InChI=1S/C14H13N3.C13H11N3.ClH/c1-17-13-7-11(15)4-2-9(13)6-10-3-5-12(16)8-14(10)17;14-10-3-1-8-5-9-2-4-11(15)7-13(9)16-12(8)6-10;/h2-8H,1H3,(H3,15,16);1-7H,14-15H2;1H Key: PEJLNXHANOHNSU-UHFFFAOYSA-N; Key: PEJLNXHANOHNSU-UHFFFAOYSA-N
- SMILES: [Cl-].C[N+]1=C2C=C(N)C=CC2=CC2=C1C=C(N)C=C2; [Cl-].n1c3c(cc2c1cc(N)cc2)ccc(c3)N.Nc3cc2[n+](c1cc(N)ccc1cc2cc3)C

Properties
Chemical formula	C_{14}H_{14}ClN_{3}
Molar mass	259.74 g·mol^{−1}

Pharmacology
ATC code	R02AA13 (WHO) QG01AC90 (WHO)
- Except where otherwise noted, data are given for materials in their standard state (at 25 °C [77 °F], 100 kPa). verify (what is ?) Infobox references

Acriflavine (INN: acriflavinium chloride) is a topical antiseptic. It has the form of an orange or brown powder. It may be harmful in the eyes or if inhaled. It is a dye and it stains the skin and may irritate. The hydrochloride form is more irritating than the neutral form. It is derived from acridine. Commercial preparations are often mixtures with proflavine. It is known by a variety of commercial names.

== Uses ==
=== Medical use ===
Acriflavine was developed in 1912 by Paul Ehrlich, a German medical researcher, and was used during the First World War against sleeping sickness and as a topical antiseptic.

=== Other uses ===
Acriflavine is used in biochemistry for fluorescently labeling high molecular weight RNA.

It is used as treatment for external fungal infections of aquarium fish.

== Research ==
Acriflavine might be effective in fighting common cold virus, and also aid the fight against increasingly antibiotic resistant bacteria because it can cure (remove) plasmids containing antimicrobial resistance genes from Gram positive bacteria.

Since 2014, acriflavine has been undergoing testing as an antimalarial drug to treat parasites with resistance to quinine and modern anti-parasitic medicines.

== Legal status ==
=== Australia ===
Acriflavine is a controlled substance in Australia and dependent on situation, is considered either a Schedule 5 (Caution) or Schedule 7 (Dangerous Poison) substance. The use, storage and preparation of the chemical is subject to strict state and territory laws.
