= Proflavine =

Names
- Preferred IUPAC name Acridine-3,6-diamine

Identifiers
CAS Number	92-62-6
3D model (JSmol)	Interactive image
ChEBI	CHEBI:8452
ChEMBL	ChEMBL55400
ChemSpider	6832
DrugBank	DB01123
ECHA InfoCard	100.001.976
KEGG	C11181
PubChem CID	7099
UNII	CY3RNB3K4T
CompTox Dashboard (EPA)	DTXSID9043776
- InChI: InChI=1S/C13H11N3/c14-10-3-1-8-5-9-2-4-11(15)7-13(9)16-12(8)6-10/h1-7H,14-15H2 Key: WDVSHHCDHLJJJR-UHFFFAOYSA-N; InChI=1/C13H11N3/c14-10-3-1-8-5-9-2-4-11(15)7-13(9)16-12(8)6-10/h1-7H,14-15H2 Key: WDVSHHCDHLJJJR-UHFFFAOYAC
- SMILES: n1c3c(cc2c1cc(N)cc2)ccc(c3)N

Properties
Chemical formula	C_{13}H_{11}N_{3}
Molar mass	209.252 g·mol^{−1}
- Except where otherwise noted, data are given for materials in their standard state (at 25 °C [77 °F], 100 kPa). verify (what is ?) Infobox references

Proflavine, also called proflavin and diaminoacridine, is an acriflavine derivative, a disinfectant bacteriostatic against many gram-positive bacteria. It has been used in the form of the dihydrochloride and hemisulfate salts as a topical antiseptic, and was formerly used as a urinary antiseptic.

Proflavine is also known to have a mutagenic effect on DNA by intercalating between nucleic acid base pairs. It differs from most other mutagenic components by causing basepair-deletions or basepair-insertions and not substitutions. In the presence of light, proflavine can induce double-stranded breaks in DNA.

Proflavine is a fluorescent dye that is sometimes used in microscopic in-vivo imaging due to its intercalation properties. However, there was concern that women exposed to proflavin could develop cervical cancer since they have mutagenesis potential. However, the retrospective analysis performed by Pantano et al. demonstrated that there is no increased cervical cancer risk after exposure to proflavine.

In astronomical spectroscopy proflavine present in interstellar clouds (derived from the modification in meteorites of polycyclic aromatic hydrocarbons by heteroatoms) strongly absorbs in the blue region at 445 nm. This makes difficult the recording of the spectra of stars that lie behind the clouds.
