= ATC code A =

ATC code A Alimentary tract and metabolism is a section of the Anatomical Therapeutic Chemical Classification System, a system of alphanumeric codes developed by the World Health Organization (WHO) for the classification of drugs and other medical products.

Codes for veterinary use (ATCvet codes) can be created by placing the letter Q in front of the human ATC code: for example, QA.
National issues of the ATC classification may include additional codes not present in this list, which follows the WHO version.
