= Domiphen bromide =

Chemical compound

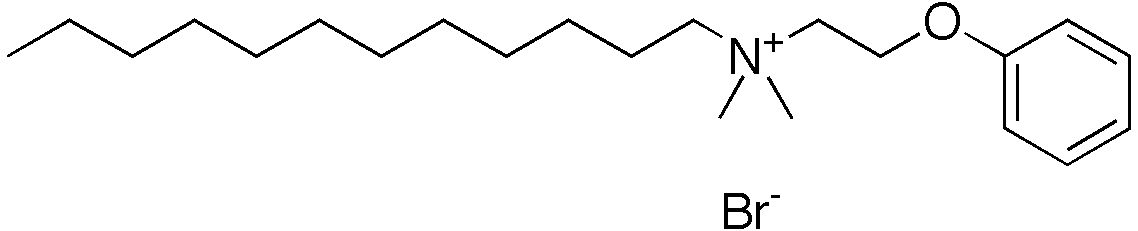

Clinical data
- AHFS/Drugs.com: International Drug Names
- ATC code: A01AB06 (WHO)

Identifiers
- IUPAC name: N,N-dimethyl-N-(2-phenoxyethyl)dodecan-1-aminium bromide
- CAS Number: 538-71-6
- PubChem CID: 10866
- DrugBank: DB11594
- ChemSpider: 10406
- UNII: R4CY19YS7C
- KEGG: D01588
- ChEMBL: ChEMBL486696
- CompTox Dashboard (EPA): DTXSID5033468
- ECHA InfoCard: 100.007.912

Chemical and physical data
- Formula: C_{22}H_{40}BrNO
- Molar mass: 414.472 g·mol^{−1}
- 3D model (JSmol): Interactive image
- SMILES: [Br-].O(c1ccccc1)CC[N+](CCCCCCCCCCCC)(C)C
- InChI: InChI=1S/C22H40NO.BrH/c1-4-5-6-7-8-9-10-11-12-16-19-23(2,3)20-21-24-22-17-14-13-15-18-22;/h13-15,17-18H,4-12,16,19-21H2,1-3H3;1H/q+1;/p-1; Key:OJIYIVCMRYCWSE-UHFFFAOYSA-M

Domiphen bromide is a chemical antiseptic and a quaternary ammonium compound.

It is also used together with other ingredients in the suspension for the active ingredient ibuprofen, in some children painkiller medicines, besides other ingredients like Maltitol liquid, water, glycerol, citric acid, sodium citrate, sodium chloride, sodium saccharin, flavour, xanthan gum, polysorbate 80.
