= L1210 cells =

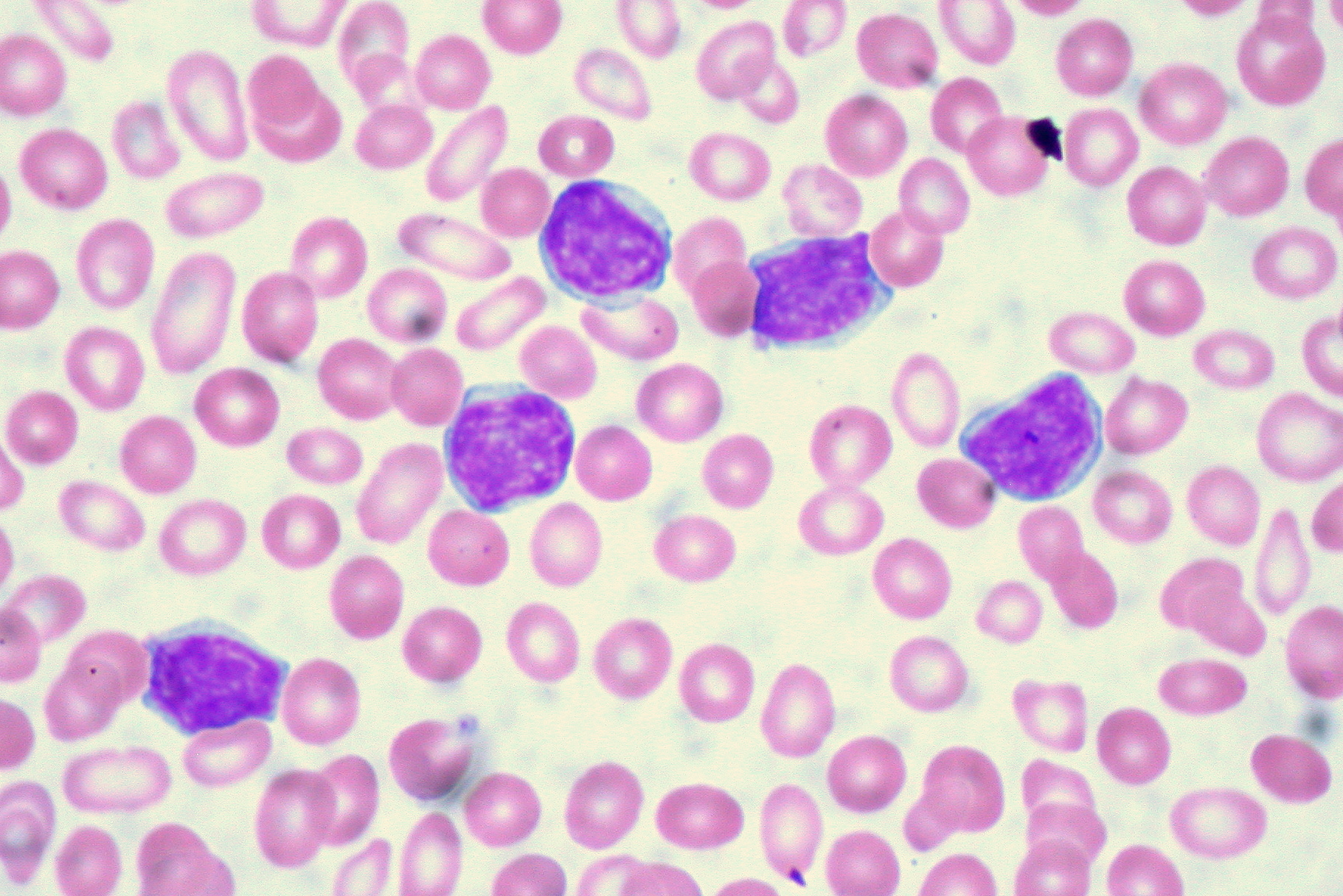
Lymphocytic leukemia cells

L1210 is a mouse lymphocytic leukemia cell line utilized in cancer research. L1210 cells are used to investigate new chemotherapeutic agents and as a model for observing drug resistance mechanisms in cancer treatment. These cells were originally derived from a mouse with lymphocytic leukemia.

== History ==
In 1954, Dr. Lloyd Law isolated the L1210 cell line by exposing DBA/2 mice to the chemical carcinogen 3-methylcholantrene. The cell line originated from the ascitic fluid of an 8-month-old female DBA/2 strain mice with lymphoid leukemia. This was done by painting the skin with methylcholantrene, which induces tumors to allow researchers to study the process of cancer development. The L1210 cells were implanted intraperitonealy (ip) through diluted ascitic fluid containing 10^{5} L1210 cells per animal. The L1210 cells exhibited median death days ranging from 6.4 to 9.9 days and tumor doubling times ranging from 0.34 to 0.46 days. These L1210 cells are lymphocytic B-cells, but have a lymphoblast morphology. These cells grow aggressively and have a high proliferative capacity, which makes L1210 cells ideal for studying leukemia pathogenesis. Lastly, L1210 cells grow rapidly in vitro and can maintain a suspension culture. This makes them ideal for in vivo experiments and in vitro assays.

In the early 1960s and 1970s, the Division of Cancer Treatment of the National Cancer Institute started using mouse leukemia models for their drug discovery programs. The L1210 cells played a major role in evaluations of potential anticancer agents. These models are still used today to study the mechanisms of drug resistance.

== Resistance mechanism ==
Methotrexate molecule

To study their resistance mechanism, L1210 cells were treated with amethopterin. Cells that showed resistance to amethopterin also showed an increase in dihydrofolate reductase (DHFR) activity. This increased DHFR activity leads to abnormal cell proliferation and is associated with tumor resistance to amethopterin (methotrexate), a common chemotherapy drug.

The resistance of L1210 cells is also due to the absence of a subtelocentric (ST) marker chromosome, which suggests that chromosomal alterations are also involved in the development of resistance. L1210 cells that showed a lack of ST marker chromosomes showed resistance to amethopterin, associating this resistance with chromosomal change.

To summarize, the resistance mechanism of L1210 cells to amethopterin is associated with an increase in DHFR activity and the absence of the ST marker chromosome. This emphasizes the role of genetic mutations that leads to the development of drug resistance.

== Multidrug resistance studies ==
Development of multidrug resistance (MDR) is a major challenge in cancer treatment. In order to study this, L1210 cell sub-lines like L1210/VCR-1 and L1210/VCR-2 are developed to study the mechanisms of MDR. These sub-lines are developed as resistant to common chemotherapy drugs. L1210/VCR-1 and L1210/VCR-2 are resistant to vincristine.

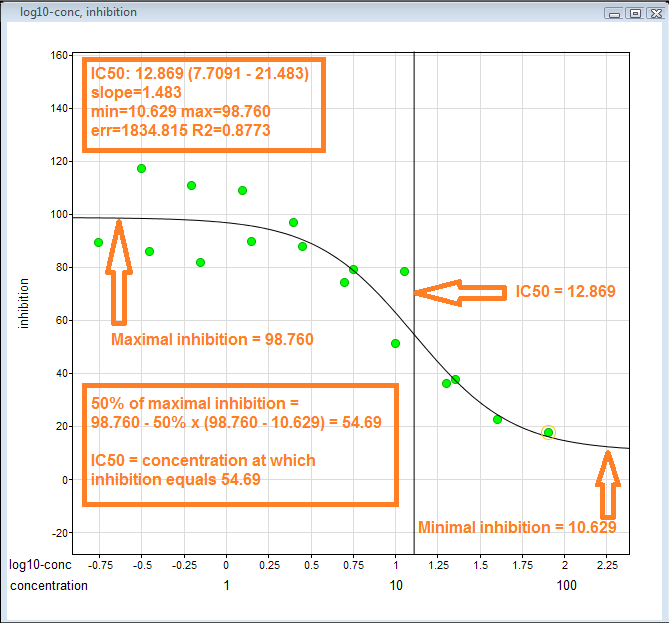
Example of an IC50 curve demonstrating visually how IC50 is derived

In one study that focused on the resistance of L1210/VCR to vincristine, L1210 cells were cultured in increasing concentrations of vincristine over a long period of time to develop L1210/VCR. L1210/VCR represents the resistant sub-line, while L1210 cells were used as a control. To test for vincristine sensitivity, the cells were cultured in RPMI 1640 medium. The IC_{50} value was used to determine vincristine sensitivity. In addition, a Western blot using monoclonal antibody C219 was used to determine the over expression of membrane P-glycoprotein (Pgp). The results showed that L1210/VCR had an IC_{50} value 200 times higher than L1210 cells, a significantly higher resistance to vincristine. L1210/VCR also exhibited interactions with the C219 antibody in the Western blot, which did not occur in the L1210 cells. This indicates that Pgp over expression is associated with multidrug resistant cells. This study shows how longterm adaptation to a chemotherapy drug can cause changes and consequently, resistance to these drugs. It also demonstrates a method of using L1210 cells and its sub-lines to test and better understand multidrug resistance.

== Applications in cancer research ==
The L1210 leukemia cell line can be injected into test recipients and will cause the recipients to develop leukemia. This allows for the evaluation of the anti-leukemia efficiency of chemotherapy drugs by methods such as screening for antimetabolites and the efficiency of topoisomerase II inhibitors. Another way researchers can use L1210 cells in cancer research is by studying the pathogenesis of leukemia to learn how the disease develops and progresses. Lastly, L1210 cells also allows researchers to investigate the mechanisms of drug resistance.

The L1210 cell lines exhibits responsiveness to a variety of chemotherapy agents, making it a valuable cell line to evaluate pre-clinical drugs and studying drug resistance mechanisms. It also serves as a model to understand the immune response to leukemia by providing information on how the L1210 cells interact with the host's immune system. This includes studies of cytokine production, tumor immunology, and chemotherapy drug efficiency. The L1210 cell line still plays a critical role in leukemia research and continues to contribute to advances in therapeutic developments and cancer biology.
