= Vasopressin analogue =

Chemicals similar in function to vasopressin

- Drug class
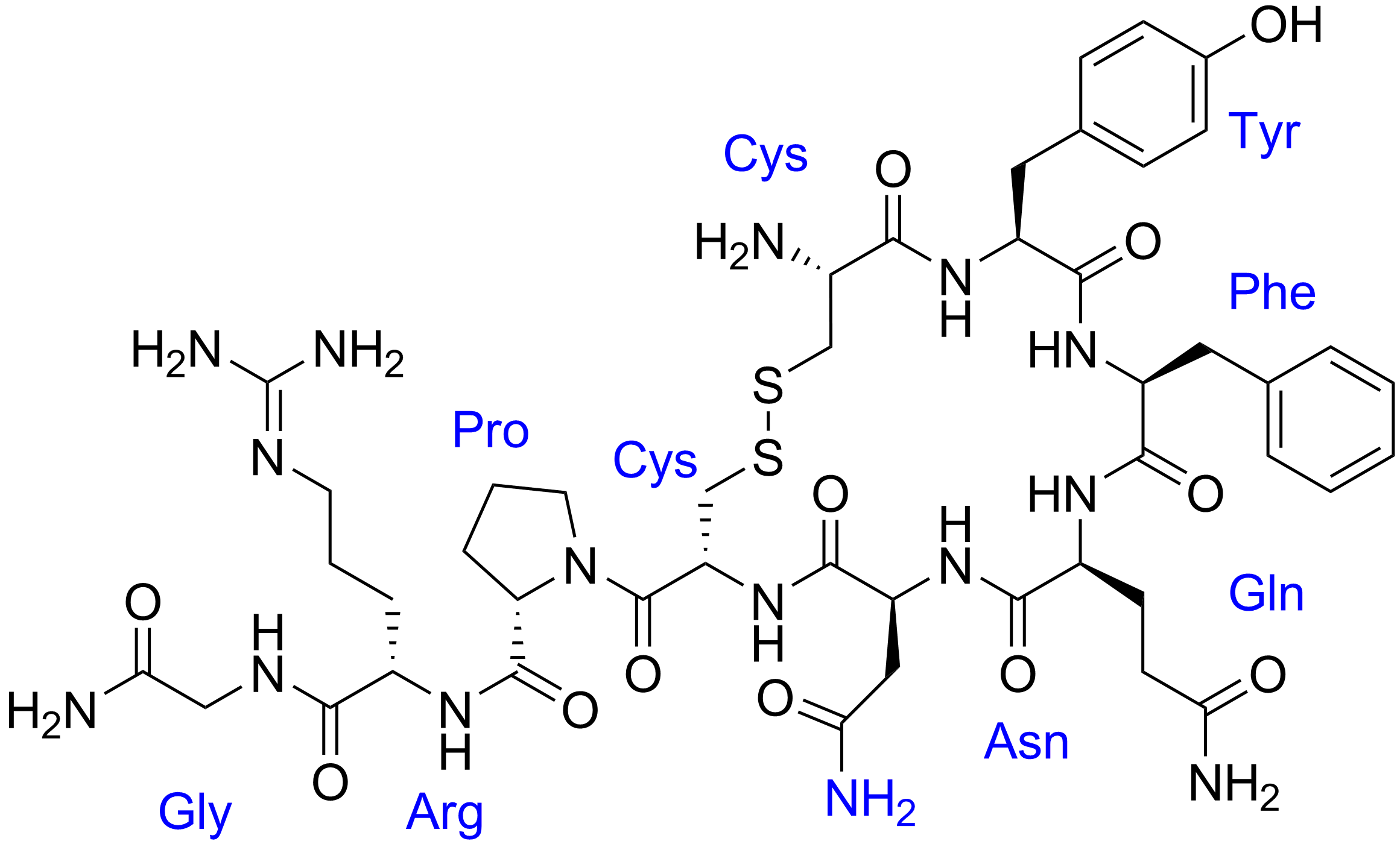
- Vasopressin

Class identifiers
- Use: Diabetes insipidus, bedwetting, hemophilia A, von Willebrand disease, etc.
- ATC code: H01BA
- Biological target: Vasopressin receptor

Legal status

Vasopressin analogues are synthetic peptides structurally and functionally similar to arginine vasopressin (AVP), a naturally occurring hormone in mammals. These compounds have been developed to target specific vasopressin receptors (V1, V2, and V3) with varying affinities, allowing for more tailored therapeutic applications. These analogues have been developed to address limitations of endogenous vasopressin, such as short half-life and lack of receptor selectivity, and to potentially reduce side effects associated with non-selective vasopressin receptor activation.

== Medical uses ==
The most prominent vasopressin analogues include desmopressin (dDAVP), terlipressin, and selepressin, each with distinct pharmacological profiles and clinical uses. Desmopressin, a V2 receptor agonist, is primarily used for treating diabetes insipidus and certain bleeding disorders. Terlipressin, with higher V1 receptor selectivity, has found applications in managing variceal bleeding and hepatorenal syndrome. Selepressin, a selective V1 receptor agonist, has been investigated for its potential in treating septic shock.

== Research ==
Ongoing research continues to explore the therapeutic potential of vasopressin analogues in various clinical conditions, particularly in the management of shock states and fluid balance disorders.

They are also used in cirrhosis patients.
