= Cetrimide =

Quaternary ammonium surfactant and antiseptic agent

- ््

Identifiers
- Compounds; Cetrimide: Mixture of; C_{12}: Dodecyltrimethylammonium bromide; C_{14}: Tetradecyltrimethylammonium bromide; C_{16}: Hexadecyltrimethylammonium bromide
CAS Number	Cetrimide: 8044-71-1; C_{14}: 57-09-0; C_{16}: 1119-94-4
3D model (JSmol)	C_{12}: Interactive image; C_{14}: Interactive image; C_{16}: Interactive image
ChEBI	C_{12}: CHEBI:282662; C_{14}: CHEBI:3565; C_{16}: CHEBI:3567
ChEMBL	C_{12}: ChEMBL109873; C_{16}: ChEMBL307346
ChemSpider	C_{12}: 13611; C_{14}: 13612; C_{16}: 5754
ECHA InfoCard	100.118.908
EC Number	Cetrimide: 617-073-5; C_{12}: 214-290-3; C_{14}: 214-291-9; C_{16}: 200-311-3
KEGG	C_{14}: C11279; C_{16}: C11275
PubChem CID	C_{12}: 14249; C_{14}: 14250; C_{16}: 5974
UNII	C_{12}: 6IC8NZ97S2; C_{14}: 8483H94W1E; C_{16}: L64N7M9BWR
- InChI: C_{12}: InChI=1S/C15H34N.BrH/c1-5-6-7-8-9-10-11-12-13-14-15-16(2,3)4;/h5-15H2,1-4H3;1H/q+1;/p-1 Key: XJWSAJYUBXQQDR-UHFFFAOYSA-M; C_{14}: InChI=1S/C17H38N.BrH/c1-5-6-7-8-9-10-11-12-13-14-15-16-17-18(2,3)4;/h5-17H2,1-4H3;1H/q+1;/p-1 Key: CXRFDZFCGOPDTD-UHFFFAOYSA-M; C_{16}: InChI=1S/C19H42N.BrH/c1-5-6-7-8-9-10-11-12-13-14-15-16-17-18-19-20(2,3)4;/h5-19H2,1-4H3;1H/q+1;/p-1 Key: LZZYPRNAOMGNLH-UHFFFAOYSA-M
- SMILES: C_{12}: CCCCCCCCCCCCCC[N+](C)(C)C.[Br-]; C_{14}: CCCCCCCCCCCCCCCC[N+](C)(C)C.[Br-]; C_{16}: CCCCCCCCCCCCCCCCCC[N+](C)(C)C.[Br-]
- Except where otherwise noted, data are given for materials in their standard state (at 25 °C [77 °F], 100 kPa). Infobox references

Cetrimide, or alkyltrimethylammonium bromide, is an antiseptic which is a mixture of three quaternary ammonium compounds: tetradonium bromide (TTAB or MITMAB), cetrimonium bromide (CTAB), and laurtrimonium bromide (DTAB or LTAB). It was first discovered and developed by ICI and introduced under the brand name Cetavlon. It is used as a 1-3 % solution for cleaning roadside accident wounds. ICI also introduced Savlon, which was a combination of cetrimide and chlorhexidine. ICI sold the Savlon brand OTC to Johnson & Johnson in May 1992. Cetrimide is used in various applications such as antiseptic agents, diagnostic test and analysis, topical formulations, and dental treatment.
