= Propamidine =

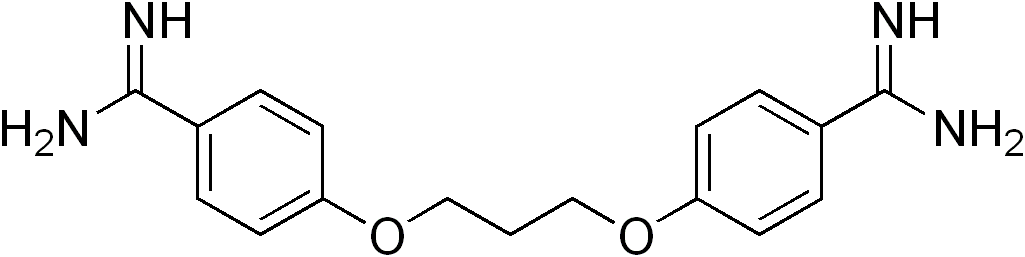
- Skeletal formula

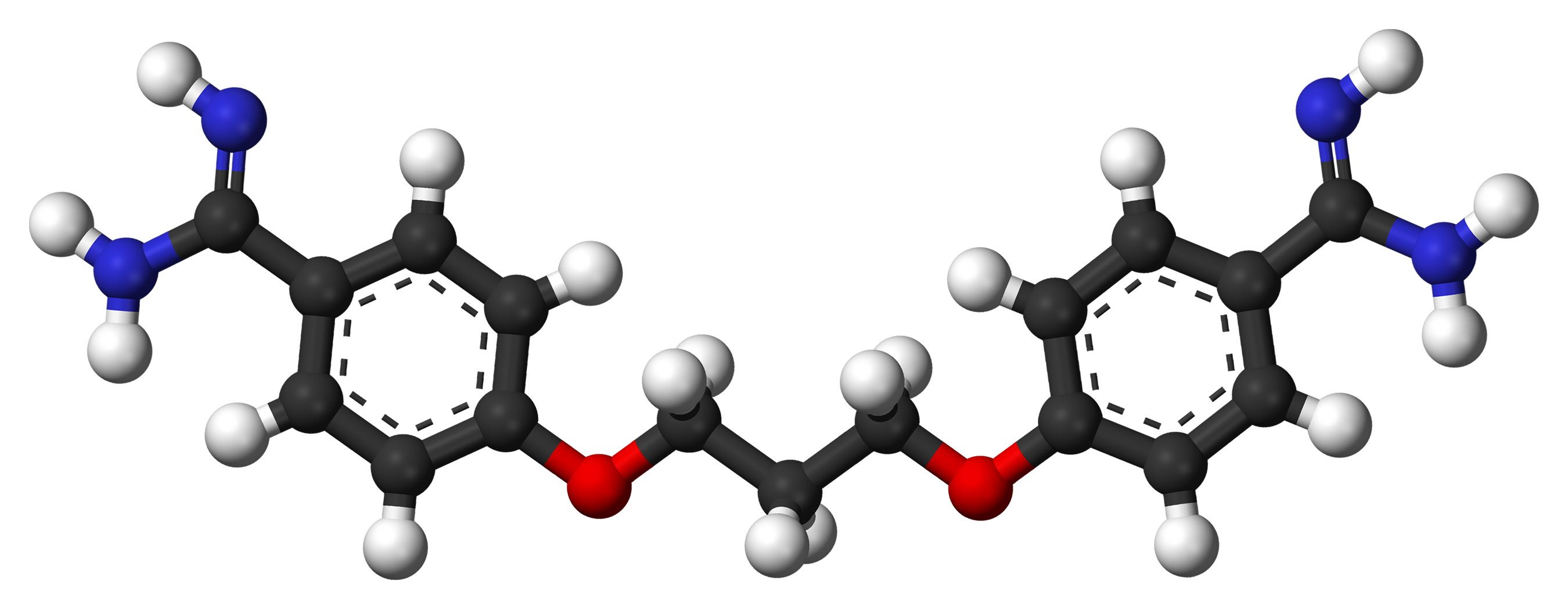
- Ball-and-stick model

Names
- Preferred IUPAC name 4,4′-[Propane-1,3-diylbis(oxy)]di(benzene-1-carboximidamide)

Identifiers
CAS Number	104-32-5; 140-63-6 (isethionate)
3D model (JSmol)	Interactive image
ChEBI	CHEBI:87462
ChEMBL	ChEMBL23013
ChemSpider	58475
ECHA InfoCard	100.002.905
PubChem CID	64949
UNII	G20G12V769; 7T9IJ84C42 (isethionate)
CompTox Dashboard (EPA)	DTXSID6048674
- InChI: InChI=1S/C17H20N4O2/c18-16(19)12-2-6-14(7-3-12)22-10-1-11-23-15-8-4-13(5-9-15)17(20)21/h2-9H,1,10-11H2,(H3,18,19)(H3,20,21) Key: WTFXJFJYEJZMFO-UHFFFAOYSA-N; InChI=1/C17H20N4O2/c18-16(19)12-2-6-14(7-3-12)22-10-1-11-23-15-8-4-13(5-9-15)17(20)21/h2-9H,1,10-11H2,(H3,18,19)(H3,20,21) Key: WTFXJFJYEJZMFO-UHFFFAOYAO
- SMILES: O(c1ccc(cc1)C(=[N@H])N)CCCOc2ccc(C(=[N@H])N)cc2

Properties
Chemical formula	C_{17}H_{20}N_{4}O_{2}
Molar mass	312.373 g·mol^{−1}

Pharmacology
ATC code	D08AC03 (WHO) S01AX15 (WHO)
- Except where otherwise noted, data are given for materials in their standard state (at 25 °C [77 °F], 100 kPa). verify (what is ?) Infobox references

Propamidine is an antiseptic and disinfectant.

Propamidine isethionate, the salt of propamidine with isethionic acid, is used in the treatment of Acanthamoeba infection.

Propamidine is a member of the aromatic diamidine group of compounds which possess bacteriostatic properties against a wide range of organisms. These diamidines exert antibacterial action against pyogenic cocci, antibiotic resistant staphylococci and some Gram-negative bacilli, the activity of the diamidines being retained in the presence of organic matter such as tissue fluids, pus and serum.
