= Antimicrobial polymer =

Medicinal locomotive lab

Polymers with the ability to kill or inhibit the growth of microorganisms such as bacteria, fungi, or viruses are classified as antimicrobial agents. This class of polymers consists of natural polymers with inherent antimicrobial activity and polymers modified to exhibit antimicrobial activity. Polymers are generally nonvolatile, chemically stable, and can be chemically and physically modified to display desired characteristics and antimicrobial activity. Antimicrobial polymers are a prime candidate for use in the food industry to prevent bacterial contamination and in water sanitation to inhibit the growth of microorganisms in drinking water.

== Mechanism of action ==
Antimicrobial polymers inhibit cell growth and initiate cell death through two primary mechanisms. The first mechanism is utilized by contact-active polymers. Contact-active polymers utilize electrostatic interactions, the hydrophobic effect, and the chelate effect. Electrostatic attraction is a common initial interaction of an antimicrobial polymer with a microbe. The chelating and hydrophobic effects are common secondary interactions of antimicrobial polymers with microbes.

Cationically charged antimicrobial polymers are attracted to the anionically charged bacterial cell walls. The outer wall of bacterial cells possesses a net negative charge. The cytoplasmic membrane of bacterial cells has a negative charge and contains essential proteins. The secondary interaction, the chelating effect, involves the bonding of the antimicrobial polymer to the microbial cell. These interactions lead to membrane disruption and ultimately inhibited cell growth or death.

The cytoplasmic membrane of a cell is a semi-permeable membrane, which controls the transport of solutes into the cell. The phospholipid bilayer is an important component of the cell membrane, which is composed of hydrophilic heads and a hydrophobic tail. The hydrophilic heads form the inner and outer linings of the cell membrane, while the hydrophobic tails compose the interior of the membrane. The secondary interaction, the hydrophobic effect, involves the accumulation of nonpolar compounds away from water. Nonpolar components of antimicrobial polymers insert themselves into the nonpolar interior of the cell membrane.

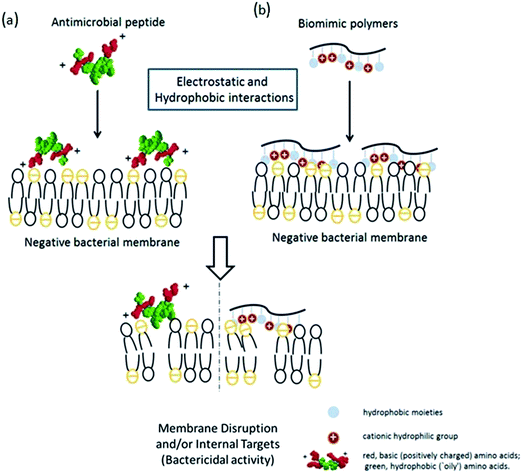
Electrostatic and hydrophobic interaction of an antimicrobial polymer and biomimetic polymer, causing membrane disruption and cell death

High molecular weight polymers commonly induce cell death or inhibition through contact-active interactions with the surface of cells. Cell death and inhibition result from impairment of normal cellular function. Positive residues on the polymer electrostatically interact with negative charges on the cell and induce secondary cellular effects. Cellular membrane penetration is common in low molecular weight polymers. The initial electrostatic and hydrophobic interaction of an antimicrobial polymer and biomimetic polymer causes membrane disruption and cell death. The hydrophobic tail of the polymer penetrates the phospholipid bilayer into the hydrophobic region, resulting in membrane disruption and denaturing of proteins and enzymes, as well as other secondary effects. Secondary effects include disruption of solute and electron transport as well as disturbances to energy production pathways, which leads to cell death.

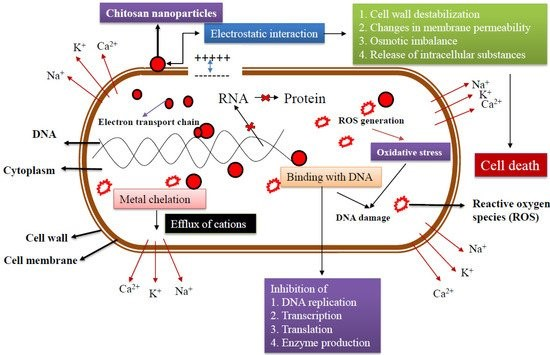
Schematic of the antimicrobial mechanism of action, demonstrating the antimicrobial mechanism of polymers

The second mechanism is characterized by the release of low molecular weight antimicrobial agents from polymers. Antimicrobial agents that are released from polymers induce cell death through binding to or penetrating the cell wall. When antimicrobial agents bind to proteins, structural changes occur to the cell membrane, resulting in cellular death. The penetration of nanoparticle antimicrobial agents into the cell wall enables the antimicrobial agents to interact with cell DNA. Microbe death results from the effects to DNA transcription and mRNA synthesis when polymer nanoparticles combine with DNA.

== Primary characteristics of antimicrobial polymers ==
There are different primary characteristics of antimicrobial polymers, dependent upon the mechanism of action. The two primary characteristics of contact-active antimicrobial polymers are cationic charge and hydrophobicity. Cationic residues are necessary to induce the interaction with the microbial cell wall. Polycations such as quaternary ammonium, quaternary phosphonium, and guanidinium are frequently found in antimicrobial polymers. Hydrophobic residues improve binding to the lipid bilayer and are utilized for insertion into the microbial cell wall. Non-contact-active antimicrobial polymers require the addition of antimicrobial agents to induce activity. Common agents added include N-halamine compounds, nitric oxide, and copper and silver nanoparticles.

== Classes of antimicrobial polymers ==
Antimicrobial polymers are generally classified into two categories based on how antimicrobial activity is conferred. The first are polymers with inherent antimicrobial effects which do not require any modifications to incite antimicrobial behavior. The other class requires modification to enable antimicrobial activity and can be differentiated by the type of modification. Polymers may be chemically modified to induce antimicrobial behavior or they may be used as a backbone for the addition of organic or inorganic compounds.

=== Inherent antimicrobial activity ===
Polymers with inherent antimicrobial activity include chitosan, poly-ε-lysine, quaternary ammonium compounds, polyethylenimine, and polyguanidines. Chitosan is a nontoxic polymer that has displayed broad-spectrum antimicrobial activity. The mechanism of action for chitosan includes electrostatic interaction, the chelate effect, and the hydrophobic effect. Electrostatic interaction is the primary initial interaction when the pH is lower, while the chelating and hydrophobic effects are the primary initial interactions when the pH is higher. Growth inhibition and death of fungi, bacteria, and yeasts have been seen from chitosan. The antimicrobial effect of chitosan is greater on fungi than yeasts and more effective on gram-negative bacteria than gram-positive bacteria.

Poly-ε-lysine is a biodegradable, nontoxic, edible antimicrobial polymer. This polymer utilizes electrostatic interactions to attach to the cell wall, therefore disrupting the integrity of the cell wall. Poly-ε-lysine penetrates the cell wall, causing physiological damage to the cell and death. In comparison to a similar synthetic polymer, poly-ε-lysine is more effective against gram-positive than gram-negative bacteria. Poly-ε-lysine is also effective against Bacillus coagulans, Bacillus stearothermophilus, and Bacillus subtilis.

Benzalkonium chloride, stearalkonium chloride, and cetrimonium are all quaternary ammonium compounds containing nitrogen. The antibacterial activity of these compounds is affected by the number of carbon atoms and the length of the nitrogen-containing chain. Optimal antimicrobial activity is generally seen in quaternary ammonium compounds with a long chain length, containing 8 to 18 carbon atoms. Increased activity is seen against gram-positive bacteria in polymers with a chain length of 12 to 14 carbon atoms, while improved activity against gram-negative bacteria is seen in polymers with a chain length of 14 to 16 carbon atoms. Polymer quaternary ammonium compounds containing nitrogen induce cell death through electrostatic interactions and the hydrophobic effect. This group of polymers displays limited hemolytic activity, making them advantageous for use in cosmetics and healthcare.

Polyethylenimine is a synthetic, nonbiodegradable polymer containing nitrogen. This polymer induces cell death through cell membrane rupture. When attached to immobilized surfaces including glass and plastic, N-alkyl-polyethylenimine caused cell inactivation in almost 100% of airborne and waterborne bacteria and fungi. A benefit of this polymer is that it is nontoxic to mammalian cells. Polyethylenimine has been applied in the medical industry for use in prostheses. Bacteria growth was reduced by 92% when polyethylenimine was tested as a coating surface for medical devices. The activity of polyethylenimine is affected by the molecular weight of the polymer; low molecular weight polyethylenimine displays negligible activity, while displaying great antimicrobial activity in its high molecular weight form.

Polyguanidines are another class of antimicrobial polymers containing nitrogen. This class of antimicrobial polymers is nontoxic and exhibits high water solubility. Polyguanidines display broad-spectrum antimicrobial activity and initially interact with microbes using electrostatic forces. Greater activity against gram-positive bacteria has been seen with polyguanidines than against gram-negative bacteria. The reason for the difference in activity is likened to the different structures of gram-positive and gram-negative bacteria. Gram-negative bacteria have a thinner peptidoglycan layer than gram-positive bacteria. In addition, gram-negative bacteria have an outer lipid membrane, while gram-positive bacteria do not. High molecular weight polymers are able to penetrate gram-positive bacteria.

=== Antimicrobial activity through chemical modification ===
This class of polymers does not have any inherent antimicrobial activity. To induce antimicrobial activity, polymers are chemically modified to include active agents. Active side groups are attached to the polymer backbone to generate antimicrobial activity. Pendant groups, antibiotic drugs, or inorganic particles can be adjoined to the polymer.

Pendant groups that are attached to the polymer backbone include quaternary ammonium, hydroxyl groups with an organic acid, and others. Antimicrobial polymers containing quaternary ammonium as a side group are commonly synthesized from methacrylic monomers. The benefit of these monomers is that the hydrophobicity, molecular weight, and surface charge can all be manipulated. Hydrophobicity of the polymer has a strong effect on antimicrobial activity. Polysiloxanes, which have a quaternary ammonium pendant group, have demonstrated activity against several strains of bacteria including Enterococcus hirae, E. coli, and P. aeruginosa. The flexibility and amphiphilic nature of this polymer enhances the antimicrobial activity. When benzaldehyde, a hydroxyl group containing organic acid, is used as a side group with methyl methacrylate polymers, growth inhibition five times that of control surfaces has been shown. Benzaldehyde has inherent antimicrobial activity and has been incorporated into polymers to improve activity. Polymers with quaternary ammonium or hydroxyl groups with an organic acid as a pendant group have demonstrated activity against many types of bacteria, fungi, and algae.

Antimicrobial activity can also be induced through the addition of inorganic particles such as silver, copper, and titanium dioxide nanoparticles to a polymer. Metal nanoparticles are incorporated into the polymer to form polymeric nanocomposites. Silver is utilized in antimicrobial polymers because of its stability as well as broad-spectrum antimicrobial activity. Positive silver ions are produced in environments beneficial for the growth of bacteria. These positive silver ions physically interact with cell wall proteins resulting in membrane disruption and cell death. Silver nanoparticles embedded into a cationic polymer have displayed activity against E.coli and S.aureus. Copper and titanium dioxide nanoparticles are less commonly employed in antimicrobial polymers than silver nanoparticles. Copper nanoparticles embedded into polypropylene nanocomposites have demonstrated the ability to kill 99.9% of bacteria. Titanium dioxide is a nontoxic material with antimicrobial activity that is photo-activated. Titanium dioxide has been embedded in polypropylene to create photoactive antimicrobial polymers. The antimicrobial activity of the polymer composite is initiated by a light source. The light source causes the titanium dioxide to be oxidized, which results in the release of highly reactive hydroxyl species that disrupt bacteria. The effectiveness of the photoactive antimicrobial polymer has been demonstrated against the bacteria E.coli.

Another class of antibacterial polymers includes those whose activity is introduced through the incorporation of antibiotics into the polymer matrix. The chemical triclosan is commonly utilized for its antibacterial properties. Triclosan mixed with the copolymer styrene-acrylate exhibits antibacterial activity against E. faecalis. In addition, triclosan combined with the polymer polyvinyl alcohol has increased antibacterial activity compared to triclosan not incorporated in a polymer. The polymer polyethylenimine has also been modified to include antibiotics. Polyethylenimine is used to make bacterial cell walls more permeable, therefore increasing the sensitivity of bacteria to antibiotics. Polyethylenimine increases the effectiveness of the antibiotics including ampicillin, rifampin, cefotaxime, as well as others.

=== Protein-mimicking polymers ===
Magainin and defensin are natural peptides, short polymers composed of amino acids, which display exceptional antimicrobial activity. The antimicrobial activity is a product of the peptides’ structure, including its highly rigid backbone. These peptides have organized pendant groups, making one side of the polymer hydrophobic and the other side cationic. This group of polymers efficiently induce cell death through cell wall penetration. Polymer mimics of these antimicrobial peptides have been developed. Protein-mimicking polymers emulate the structure of magainin and defensin. Examples of protein mimicking polymers include poly(phenylene ethynylene)-based and N-carboxyanhydride-based polymers. Poly(phenylene ethynylene) polymers with amino acid pendant groups were manufactured to have positively charged side groups and a stiff backbone. The synthetic polymer had low toxicity and strong antimicrobial activity. In addition, N-carboxyanhydride-based polymers with the hydrophilic amino acid lysine and different hydrophobic amino acids were developed. The polymers displayed antimicrobial activity against E. coli, C.albicans, and others.

== Factors that affect antimicrobial activity ==
=== Molecular weight ===
The molecular weight of the polymer is perhaps one of the most important properties to consider when determining antimicrobial properties because antimicrobial activity is markedly dependent on the molecular weight. It has been determined that optimal activity is achieved when polymers have a molecular weight in the range of 1.4×10^{4} Da to 9.4×10^{4} Da. Weights larger than this range show a decrease in activity. This dependence on weight can be attributed to the sequence of steps necessary for biocidal action. Extremely large molecular weight polymers will have trouble diffusing through the bacterial cell wall and cytoplasm. Thus much effort has been directed towards controlling the molecular weight of the polymer.

=== Counter ion ===
Most bacterial cell walls are negatively charged, and so most antimicrobial polymers must be positively charged to facilitate the adsorption process. The structure of the counter ion, or the ion associated with the polymer to balance charge, also affects the antimicrobial activity. Counter anions that form a strong ion-pair with the polymer impede the antimicrobial activity because the counter ion will prevent the polymer from interacting with the bacteria. However, ions that form a loose ion-pair or readily dissociate from the polymer, exhibit a positive influence on the activity because it allows the polymer to interact freely with the bacteria.

=== Spacer length/alkyl chain length ===
The spacer length or alkyl chain length refers to the length of the carbon chain that composes the polymer backbone. The length of this chain has been investigated to see if it affects the antimicrobial activity of the polymer. Results have generally shown that longer alkyl chains have resulted in higher activity. There are two primary explanations for this effect. Firstly, longer chains have more active sites available for adsorption with the bacteria cell wall and cytoplasmic membrane. Secondly, longer chains aggregate differently than shorter chains, which again may provide a better means for adsorption. However, shorter chain lengths diffuse more easily.

== Disadvantages ==
A major disadvantage of antimicrobial polymers is that macromolecules are very large and thus may not act as fast as small molecule agents. Biocidal polymers that require contact times on the order of hours to provide substantial reductions in pathogens really have no practical value. Seconds, or minutes at most, should be the contact time goal for a real application. Furthermore, if the structural modification to the polymer caused by biocidal functionalization adversely affects the intended use, the polymer will be of no practical value. For example, if a fiber that must be exposed to aqueous bleach to render it antimicrobial (an N-halamine polymer) is weakened by that exposure, or its dye is bleached, it will have limited use.

== Synthetic methods ==
=== Synthesis from antimicrobial monomers ===
This synthetic method involves covalently linking antimicrobial agents that contain functional groups with high antimicrobial activity, such as hydroxyl, carboxyl, or amino groups to a variety of polymerizable derivatives, or monomers before polymerization. The antimicrobial activity of the active agent may be either reduced or enhanced by polymerization. This depends on how the agent kills bacteria, either by depleting the bacterial food supply or through bacterial membrane disruption and the kind of monomer used. Differences have been reported when homo-polymers are compared to copolymers. Examples of antimicrobial polymers synthesized from antimicrobial monomers are included in Table 2.

Table 2: Polymers synthesized from antimicrobial monomers and their antimicrobial properties

Monomer	Inhibited Microbial Species	Antimicrobial Mechanism	Comparison of Polymers with Monomer
	Fungus: C. albicans; A. niger	Slow release of 4-amino-N-(5-methyl-3-isoxazoly)benzenesulfonamide	The homopolymer is more effective than the monomer at all concentrations.
	Bacteria:Gram-positive; Gram-negative	Tin moiety on the polymer surface interacts with the cell wall.	Copolymerization of antimicrobial monomer and styrene decreases the potency of the monomer.
	Bacteria:S. aureus; P. aeruginosa; E. coli;	The presence of benzimidazole derivatives inhibit cytochrome P-450 monooxygenase	The homopolymer is more effective than the monomer.
	Bacteria:Gram-positive; Gram-negative	Release of norfloxacin which inhibits bacterial DNA gyrase and cell growth.	----
	Bacteria:Pseudomonas aeruginosa;Staphylococcus	Active agent is 2,4,4’-trichloro-2’-hydroxydiphenyl-ether	The homopolymer and copolymers with methyl methacrylate, styrene are all less effective than the monomer.
	Bacteria:S. aureus; P. aeruginosa;	Active agent is phenol group.	Polymerization significantly decreases the antimicrobial activity of the monomers.
	Bacteria:E-coli	Direct transfer of oxidative halogen from polymer to the cell wall of the organism.	----
	Bacteria:E. coli;S. aureus; S. typhimurium	Release of 8-hydroxyquinoline moieties	The homopolymer and the copolymers with acrylamide are both less effective than the monomer.
	Bacteria:Gram-positive bacteria	Active agent is Sulfonium salt	The homopolymer is more effective than the corresponding model compound (p-ethylbenzyl tetramethylene sulforium tetrafluoroborate).
	Bacteria: Oral streptococci	Direct cationic binding to cell wall, which leads to the disruption of the cell wall and cell death.	----
	Bacteria: S. aureus; E-coli	Cationic biocides targets the cytoplasmic membranes; Similarities of the polymer pendent groups and the lipid layer enhances diffusion into the cell wall	The monomers are not active, while homopolymers show moderate activities in concentration from 1 mg/mL to 3.9 mg/mL.
	Bacteria: S. aureus; E. coli	Membrane disruption	----
	Bacteria: Staphylococcus;E. coli	Immobilization of high concentrations of chlorine to enable rapid biocidal activities and the liberation of very low amounts of corrosive free chlorine into water	----

=== Synthesis by adding antimicrobial agents to preformed polymers ===
This synthetic method involves first synthesizing the polymer, followed by modification with an active species. The following kinds of monomers are usually used to form the backbone of homopolymers or copolymers: vinylbenzyl chloride, methyl methacrylate, 2-chloroethyl vinyl ether, vinyl alcohol, maleic anhydride. The polymers are then activated by anchoring antimicrobial species, such as phosphonium salts, ammonium salts, or phenol groups via quaternization, substitution of chloride, or hydrolysis of anhydride. Examples of polymers synthesized from this method are provided in Table 3.

Table 3: Antimicrobial polymers synthesized from preformed polymers and antimicrobial properties

Polymer	Inhibited Microbial Species	Antimicrobial Mechanism
	Fungus: Candida albicans; Aspergillus flavus; Bacteria: S. aureus; E. coli; B. subtilis; Fusarium oxysporum	Active group: Phosphonium groups.
	Fungus: Aspergillus fumigatus; Penicillium pinophilum	The release of m- 2-benzimidazolecarbamoyl moiety.
	Bacteria: E. coli; S. aureus	Active groups: phenolic hydroxyl group.
	Bacteria: E. coli; S. aureus	Active group: Quaternary ammonium group.
	Fungus: Trichophyton rubrum; Bacteria: Gram-negative bacteria	Active groups: Phosphonium and quaternary ammonium groups.

=== Synthesis by adding antimicrobial agents to naturally occurring polymers ===
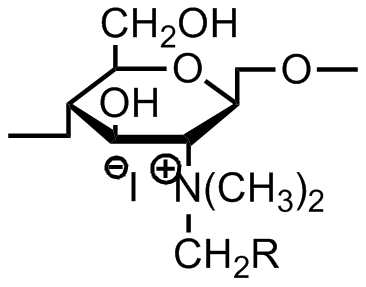
Quaternized N-alklyl Chitosan

Chitin is the second-most abundant biopolymer in nature. The deacetylated product of chitin—chitosan has been found to have antimicrobial activity without toxicity to humans. This synthetic technique involves making chitosan derivatives to obtain better antimicrobial activity. Currently, work has involved the introduction of alkyl groups to the amine groups to make quaternized N-alkyl chitosan derivatives, introduction of extra quaternary ammonium grafts to the chitosan, and modification with phenolic hydroxyl moieties.

=== Synthesis by insertion of antimicrobial agents into polymer backbone ===
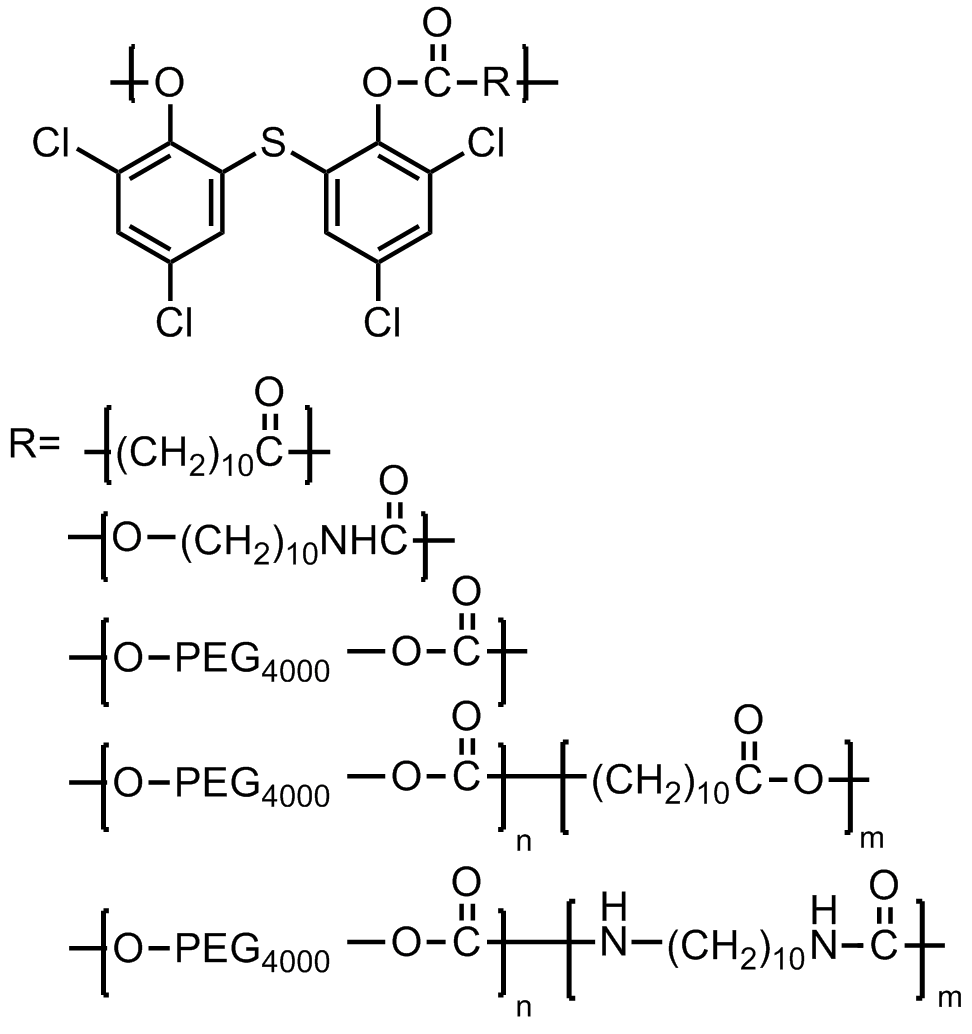
Incorporation of bithionol into the polymer backbone

This method involves using chemical reactions to incorporate antimicrobial agents into the polymeric backbones. Polymers with biologically active groups, such as polyamides, polyesters, and polyurethanes are desirable as they may be hydrolyzed to active drugs and small innocuous molecules. For example, a series of polyketones have been synthesized and studied, which show an inhibitory effect on the growth of B. subtilis and P. fluorescens as well as fungi, A. niger and T. viride. There are also studies which incorporate antibiotics into the backbone of the polymer.

== Requirements of an antimicrobial polymer ==
In order for an antimicrobial polymer to be a viable option for large-scale distribution and use there are several basic requirements that must be first fulfilled:

- The synthesis of the polymer should be easy and relatively inexpensive. To be produced on an industrial scale the synthetic route should ideally utilize techniques that have already been well developed.
- The polymer should have a long shelf life, or be stable over long periods of time. It should be able to be stored at the temperature for which it is intended for use.
- If the polymer is to be used for the disinfection of water, then it should be insoluble in water to prevent toxicity issues (as is the case with some current small molecule antimicrobial agents).
- The polymer should not decompose during use, or emit toxic residues.
- The polymer should not be toxic or irritating to those during handling.
- Antimicrobial activity should be able to be regenerated upon loss of activity.
- Antimicrobial polymers should be biocidal to a broad range of pathogenic microorganisms in brief times of contact.

== Applications ==
=== Water treatment ===
Polymeric disinfectants are ideal for applications in hand-held water filters, surface coatings, and fibrous disinfectants, because they can be fabricated by various techniques and can be made insoluble in water. People tend to design insoluble contact disinfectants that can inactivate, kill, or remove target microorganisms by mere contact without releasing any reactive agents to the bulk phase being disinfected. Chlorine or water-soluble disinfectants have problems with the residual toxicity, even if minimal amounts of the substance are used. Toxic residues can become concentrated in food, water, and in the environment. In addition, because free chlorine ions and other related chemicals can react with organic substances in water to yield trihalomethane analogues that are suspected of being carcinogenic, their use should be avoided. These drawbacks can be solved by the removal of microorganisms from water with insoluble substances.

=== Food applications ===
Antimicrobial substances that are incorporated into packaging materials can control microbial contamination by reducing the growth rate and the maximum growth population. This is done by extending the lagphase of the target microorganism or by inactivating the microorganisms on contact. One of these applications is to extend the shelf life of food and promote safety by reducing the rate of growth of microorganisms when the package is in contact with the surfaces of solid foods, such as meat or cheese. Second, antimicrobial packaging materials greatly reduce the potential for recontamination of processed products and simplify the treatment of materials to eliminate product contamination. For example, self-sterilizing packaging might eliminate the need for peroxide treatment in aseptic packaging. Antimicrobial polymers can also be used to cover surfaces of food processing equipment as self-sanitizer. Examples include filter gaskets, conveyors, gloves, garments, and other personal hygiene equipment.

Some polymers are inherently antimicrobial and have been used in films and coatings. Cationic polymers such as chitosan promote cell adhesion. This is because charged amines interact with negative charges on the cell membrane, and can cause leakage of intracellular constituents. Chitosan has been used as a coating and appears to protect fresh vegetables and fruits from fungal degradation. Although the antimicrobial effect is attributed to antifungal properties of chitosan, it may be possible that the chitosan acts as a barrier between the microorganisms and the nutrients contained in the produce.

=== Medicine and healthcare ===
Antimicrobial polymers are powerful candidates for controlled delivery systems and implants in dental restorative materials because of their high activities. This can be ascribed to their characteristic nature of carrying a high local charge density of active groups in the vicinity of the polymer chains. For example, electrospun fibers containing tetracycline hydrochloride based on poly(ethylene-co-vinyl acetate), poly(lactic acid), and blending were prepared to use as an antimicrobial wound dressing. Cellulose derivatives are commonly used in cosmetics as skin and hair conditioners. Quaternary ammonium cellulose derivatives are of particular interest as conditioners in hair and skin products.

== Future work in this field ==
The field of antimicrobial polymers has progressed steadily, but slowly over the past years, and appears to be on the verge of rapid expansion. This is evidenced by a broad variety of new classes of compounds that have been prepared and studied in the past few years.

Modification of polymers and fibrous surfaces, and changing the porosity, wettability, and other characteristics of the polymeric substrates, should produce implants and biomedical devices with greater resistance to microbial adhesion and biofilm formation. A number of polymers have been developed that can be incorporated into cellulose and other materials, which could provide significant advances in many fields such as food packaging, textiles, wound dressing, coating of catheter tubes, and necessarily sterile surfaces. The greater need for materials that fight infection will give incentive for discovery and use of antimicrobial polymers.

== Bibliography ==
- Cowie, J.M.G. Polymers: Chemistry and Physics of Modern Materials, Chapman and Hall, 3rd edition (2007);
- United States. Congress. Office of Technology Assessment. Biopolymers : making materials nature's way, Washington, DC:The Office, (1993);
- Marsh, J. Antimicrobial peptides, J. Wiley,（1994）；
- Wool, R.P. Bio-based polymers and composites, Elsevier Academic Press, (2005).
