= Sharklet =

Sharklet may refer to:

- Blended winglets on aircraft, specifically those manufactured by Airbus
- Sharklet (material), a plastic sheet product
