= Merthiolate =

Merthiolate refers to:

- Thiomersal, sold starting in 1927 brand name Merthiolate as a powerful topical antiseptic. Still the most common compound sold as Merthiolate.

The name "Merthiolate" became so famous as a brand that it was reused for these other compounds:

- Chlorhexidine digluconate discovered in 1954, a solution marketed by Hypermarcas under the name "Merthiolate"
- Benzalkonium chloride solution (Cloruro de benzalconio, tintura), distributed by Bayer de México under the name "merthiolate"
- Benzalkonium chloride and red dye solution, marketed by DLC Laboratories, Inc. of Paramount, California, as a mercury-free skin antiseptic under the name "Merthiolate" (brand name: De La Cruz)
