= PAPB =

PAPB may refer to:

- Polyaminopropyl biguanide, a preservative used in cleaning solutions for contact lenses
- St. George Airport (Alaska) (ICAO location indicator: PAPB), in St. George, Alaska, United States
