= CMQ =

The letters CMQ may represent any of the following:

== Media ==
- CMQ have been used as call letters for the following broadcasting stations in Havana, Cuba:
  - the pre-1959 CMQ radio and television network
  - Radio stations CMQ (AM) and CMQ-FM: currently Radio Rebelde
  - Television station CMQ-TV channel 6: currently Cubavision International
- The trade publication Canadian Metallurgical Quarterly; see Canadian Institute of Mining, Metallurgy and Petroleum
- The publication Church Music Quarterly, the magazine of the Royal School of Church Music (RSCM)

== Transport ==
- The IATA airport code for Clermont Airport in Clermont, Queensland, Australia
- Club Mitsubishi Québec (Quebec Mitsubishi auto Club)
- Reporting mark of the Central Maine and Quebec Railway

== Other ==
- Communauté métropolitaine de Québec (Quebec Metropolitan Community)
- Collège des médecins du Québec (Quebec College of Physicians)
- The Australian Securities Exchange code for Chemeq
- CMQ is The Common-Metric-Questionnaire (CMQ)
- CMQ, Certified Manager of Quality
- CMQ also refers to the Conspiracy Mentality Questionnaire.
- CMQ is a nickname of author Casey McQuiston
