= FDU =

FDU may refer to:

- Bandundu Airport, in the Democratic Republic of the Congo
- Fairleigh Dickinson University, in New Jersey, United States
- FDU materials, a class of structured mesoporous polymers
- Firemen and Deckhands' Union of New South Wales, an Australian trade union
- Fudan University, in Shanghai, China
- Führer der Unterseeboote, a naval office of the German Empire during World War I
- United Democratic Forces (Benin) (French: Forces Démocratiques Unies), a political alliance in Benin
- United Democratic Forces of Rwanda (French: Forces Democratiques Unifiées), a political alliance in Rwanda
- Faculty of Dramatic Arts (Serbian: Fakultet dramskih umetnosti), a faculty in Serbia
