= P123 (disambiguation) =

P123 is a copolymer.

P123 may also refer to:

- Jalan Tun Hamdan Sheikh Tahir, Penang state route P123
- Papyrus 123, a biblical manuscript
- Piaggio P.123, an Italian transport aircraft
- TCG Beylerbeyi (P-123), a patrol boat of the Turkish Navy
- P123, a state regional road in Latvia

== See also ==
- R-123 (Russian: Р-123), a Soviet military radio
