= Chemeq =

Australian pharmaceutical company

- Type: Public (ASX: CMQ)
- Industry: Animal Pharmaceuticals
- Founded: Founded by Dr Graham Melrose in 1989 after developing a revolutionary antimicrobial polymer
- Headquarters: Perth Western Australia
- Key people: David Williams (CEO) John Hopkins (Chairman)
- Products: Polymeric Antimicrobials
- Website: www.chemeq.com.au

Chemeq was a publicly listed company which was listed on the Australian Stock Exchange on 25 August 1998. Chemeq was founded by Dr Graham Melrose in 1989 after he developed a new type of antimicrobial polymer. This polymer can replace antibiotics in the control of disease in commercial animal populations. Its only commercial plant is located in the seaside town of Rockingham, Western Australia.

Chemeq was sued in the Supreme Court of Western Australia by investors claiming that the company had breached the terms of the investment contract. The court found against the company and ordered it to repay the $60 million it sought. Liquidators were called in when Chemeq's appeal against the decision was dismissed.

Its intellectual Property (patents, know how and trade secrets) has been folded into a subsidiary called Chemeq Technology Pty Ltd (CTPL). CTPL was launched on 15 March 2008 with the objective of developing commercial collaborations and to allow exploitation of the IP through exclusive licenses in a number of areas; including animal health, human health and industrial uses.

== Investigation ==
The Administrators, KordaMentha, in a report dated 5 December 2007, indicated that investigations into potential offences under section 438D of the Corporations Act 2001 had identified four (4) areas where further investigation were warranted. A supplementary report dated 12 May mentioned that a confidential report had been lodged with the Australian Securities and Investigations Commission (ASIC) under section 438D of the Act. The report is not available to creditors or shareholders and will be used by ASIC to determine whether any future action is to be taken against the Company and/or its directors.
