= Stearalkonium chloride =

Anti-static agent, surfactant and antimicrobial

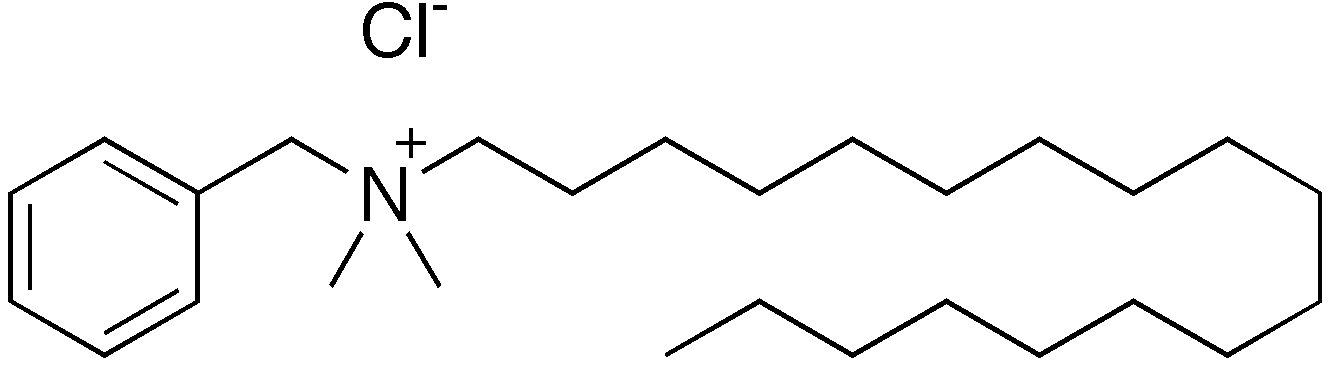

Names
- Preferred IUPAC name N-Benzyl-N,N-dimethyloctadecan-1-aminium chloride
- Other names Dimethylbenzyloctadecylammonium chloride; Benzyldimethyloctadecylammonium chloride; Benzyldimethylstearylammonium chloride; Benzylstearyldimethylammonium chloride; N,N-dimethyl-n-octadecylbenzenemethanaminium chloride

Identifiers
CAS Number	122-19-0
3D model (JSmol)	Interactive image
ChemSpider	28945
ECHA InfoCard	100.004.117
EC Number	204-527-9
PubChem CID	31204
UNII	0OUO26BB88
CompTox Dashboard (EPA)	DTXSID2025139
- InChI: InChI=1S/C27H50N.ClH/c1-4-5-6-7-8-9-10-11-12-13-14-15-16-17-18-22-25-28(2,3)26-27-23-20-19-21-24-27;/h19-21,23-24H,4-18,22,25-26H2,1-3H3;1H/q+1;/p-1 Key: SFVFIFLLYFPGHH-UHFFFAOYSA-M; InChI=1/C27H50N.ClH/c1-4-5-6-7-8-9-10-11-12-13-14-15-16-17-18-22-25-28(2,3)26-27-23-20-19-21-24-27;/h19-21,23-24H,4-18,22,25-26H2,1-3H3;1H/q+1;/p-1 Key: SFVFIFLLYFPGHH-REWHXWOFAD
- SMILES: CCCCCCCCCCCCCCCCCC[N+](C)(C)CC1=CC=CC=C1.[Cl-]

Properties
Chemical formula	C_{27}H_{50}ClN
Molar mass	424.15 g·mol^{−1}

Hazards
- Lethal dose or concentration (LD, LC)
LD_{50} (median dose)	1250 mg/kg (oral, rat)
- Except where otherwise noted, data are given for materials in their standard state (at 25 °C [77 °F], 100 kPa). verify (what is ?) Infobox references

Stearalkonium chloride is a type of benzalkonium chloride which is used as an anti-static agent, a surfactant and an antimicrobial. It is an ingredient in some cosmetics and hair care products, particularly conditioners. It was originally designed by the fabric industry for use as a fabric softener.

Toxicology studies have determined that stearalkonium chloride is safe and non-toxic at the concentrations typically used in cosmetic products (0.1 to 5%). At higher concentrations (25% solution), it has been shown to cause minor skin and eye irritation in animals.

== See also ==
- Benzalkonium chloride – Surfactant and antiseptic agent
- Polyaminopropyl biguanide, an alternative preservative for contact lens solutions
- Ethylenediaminetetraacetic acid
- Triclosan – Antimicrobial agent
- Thiomersal – Organomercury antiseptic and antifungal agent
