= P123 =

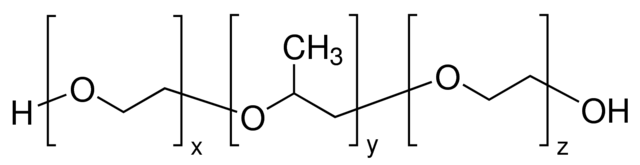

Names
- IUPAC name Poly(ethylene glycol)-block-poly(propylene glycol)-block-poly(ethylene glycol)
- Other names PEG-PPG-PEG, Pluronic P-123

Identifiers
CAS Number	9003-11-6
UNII	199SZS8E2Q

Properties
Chemical formula	HO(CH_{2}CH_{2}O)_{20}(CH_{2}CH(CH_{3})O)_{70}(CH_{2}CH_{2}O)_{20}H
Molar mass	~5800 g/mol
Appearance	Waxy Paste
Density	1.018 g/mL at 25 °C
Melting point	-24,99 °C at 1.013 hPa
Boiling point	> 149 °C
- Except where otherwise noted, data are given for materials in their standard state (at 25 °C [77 °F], 100 kPa). Infobox references

Pluronic P123 is a symmetric triblock copolymer comprising poly(ethylene oxide) (PEO) and poly(propylene oxide) (PPO) in an alternating linear fashion, PEO-PPO-PEO. The unique characteristic of PPO block, which is hydrophobic at temperatures above 288 K and is soluble in water at temperatures below 288 K, leads to the formation of micelle consisting of PEO-PPO-PEO triblock copolymers. Some studies report that the hydrophobic core contains PPO block, and a hydrophilic corona consists of PEO block. In 30wt% aqueous solution Pluronic P123 forms a cubic gel phase.

The nominal chemical formula of P123 is HO(CH_{2}CH_{2}O)_{20}(CH_{2}CH(CH_{3})O)_{70}(CH_{2}CH_{2}O)_{20}H, which corresponds to a molecular weight of around 5800 g/mol. Triblock copolymers based on PEO-PPO-PEO chains are known generically as poloxamer.

Poloxamers have behaviors similar to those of hydrocarbon surfactants, and will form micelles when placed in a selective solvent such as water. They can form both spherical and cylindrical micelles

== Uses ==
P123 has been used in the synthesis of mesoporous materials including FDU-14. Dissolved P-123 forms micelles that are used as the backbone to make structured mesoporous materials such as SBA-15.
