= Lysol =

Cleaning products brand name

- Product type: Disinfectant, all-purpose cleaners
- Current owner: Reckitt
- Country: United States
- Introduced: 1889; 137 years ago
- Related brands: Dettol (Sagrotan)
- Markets: United States, Canada, Europe, India (as Lizol), Philippines, Mexico and Chile
- Previous owners: Lehn & Fink (later subsidiary of Sterling Drug)
- Tagline: "Healthing"
- Website: www.lysol.com

Lysol (/ˈlaɪsɒl/, LYE-sol; spelled Lizol in India and Bangladesh) is an American brand of cleaning and disinfecting products distributed by Reckitt, which markets the similar Dettol or Sagrotan in other markets. The line includes liquid solutions for hard and soft surfaces, air treatment, and hand washing. The active ingredients in many Lysol products are quaternary ammonium compounds such as benzalkonium chloride or benzalkonium saccharinate, although some rely on ethanol, citric acid, or hydrogen peroxide. Lysol has been used since its invention in the late 19th century as a household and industrial cleaning agent, and previously as a medical disinfectant.

== History ==
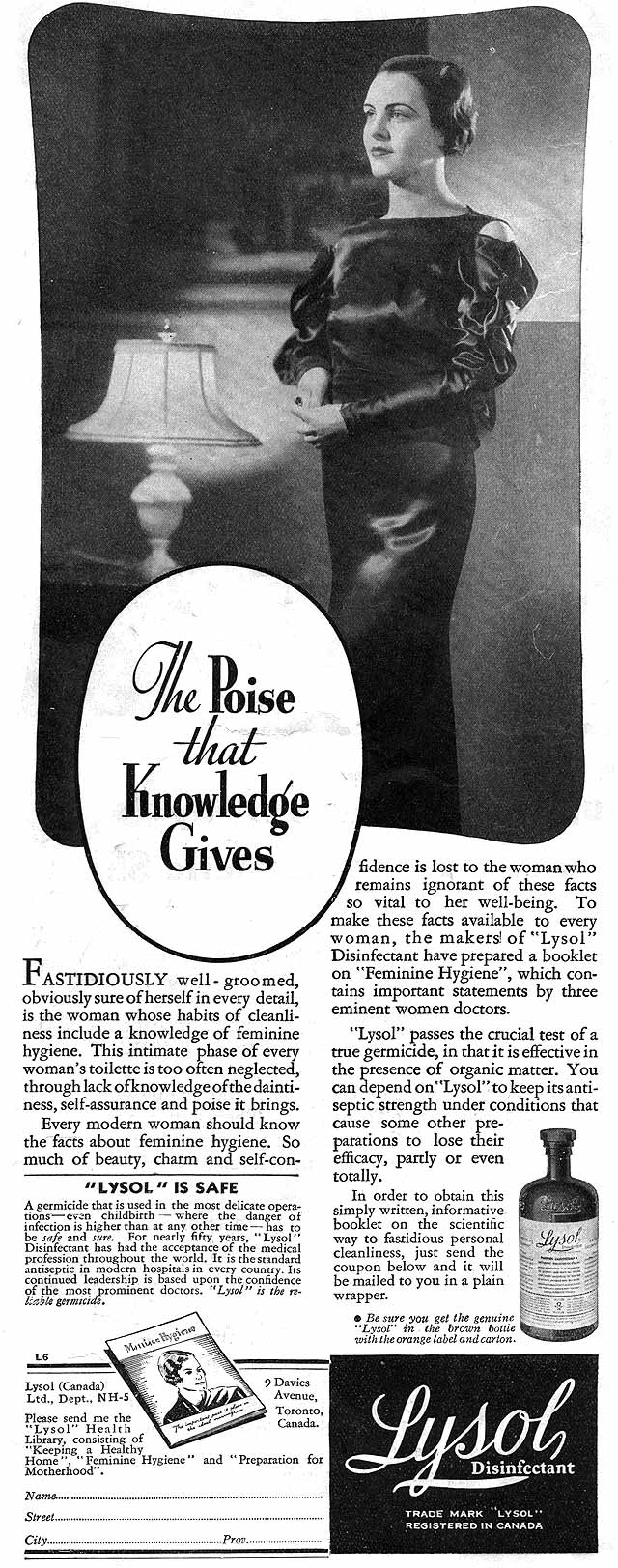
A 1935 Canadian advertisement promoting Lysol as a feminine hygiene product, using the slogan "The poise that knowledge gives"

The first Lysol Brand Antiseptic Disinfectant was introduced in 1889 by Gustav Raupenstrauch to help end a cholera epidemic happening in Germany. The name was derived from the term lysis, which is the process of breaking down biological cell membranes. The original formulation of Lysol contained cresols derived from coal tar. This formulation may still be available commercially in some parts of the world. Formulations containing chlorophenol are still available in the United Kingdom.

In 1911, drinking Lysol was the most common means of suicide by poisoning in Australia and New York.

=== Use during the 1918 Spanish flu pandemic ===
In 1918, during the Spanish flu pandemic, Lehn & Fink, Inc. advertised Lysol disinfectant as an effective countermeasure to the influenza virus. Newspaper advertisements provided tips for preventing the spread of the disease, including washing sick-rooms with Lysol, as well as everything that came in contact with patients. A small (US50¢) bottle made 5 US gallons (19 L; 4.2 imp gal) of disinfectant solution, and a smaller (US25¢) bottle made 2 US gallons (7.6 L; 1.7 imp gal). The company also advertised the "unrefined" Lysol F. & F. (Farm & Factory) for use in factories and other large buildings – a 5-US-gallon (19 L; 4.2 imp gal) can, when diluted as directed, made 50 US gallons (190 L; 42 imp gal) of disinfecting solution.

=== Use as a contraceptive ===
The Lysol disinfectant douche once was "the leading feminine hygiene product" in the United States. Advertisements for Lysol during the 1930s hinted at its use as a contraceptive but never explicitly promoted it to be used as such. Advertisements did note that Lysol was safe to use including on "delicate female tissues". By 1911, 193 Lysol poisonings were recorded along with five deaths from "uterine irrigation".

Lysol ads also included recommendations from female gynecologists that Lysol would resolve women's marital distress through the practice of complete feminine hygiene and resolve fears of pregnancy for married women. Douching with Lysol disinfectant does not prevent pregnancy and can result in undesirable vaginal health outcomes as well as has resulted in death for some women using it as a contraceptive or as an abortifacient.

=== Use as an abortifacient ===
Earlier formulations of Lysol contained cresol, a compound that can induce abortions, and it was widely used by women who could not otherwise obtain legal abortions in the United States, although the medical community was relatively unaware of the phenomenon for the first half of the 20th century. It remained a popular birth control method from the Great Depression through the 1960s. By the 1960s, published medical literature had acknowledged the common use of Lysol and other soaps to induce abortions, which could lead to fatal renal failure and sepsis.

=== Product innovations ===
- 1930: Lysol Brand Disinfectant Liquid was introduced to drug stores and hospitals.
- 1957/58 Lysol purchased the rights to private label National Laboratories, Inc's Disinfectant spray.
- 1962: Lysol released the Lysol Disinfectant Spray, which used a new method of aerosol application.
- 1968: Lysol began creating bathroom cleaners and released the Lysol Toilet Bowl Cleaner.
- 1985: Lysol All Purpose Cleaner was released.
- 1988: Lysol began shipping aerosol disinfectants to humid areas such as Houston, to combat occupational lung diseases, (also known as "lung rot").
- 2000: Pre-moistened Lysol Brand Disinfecting Wipes was released, a cleaning wipe for use on hard, nonporous surfaces.
- 2009: Lysol began producing hand soaps.

Ownership: Lehn & Fink was acquired by Sterling Drug in 1967 and Reckitt & Colman acquired L&F in 1994 when Bayer acquired Sterling-Winthrop. As of 2015 Lysol products were distributed by Reckitt Benckiser LLC of Parsippany, New Jersey.

== Ingredients ==
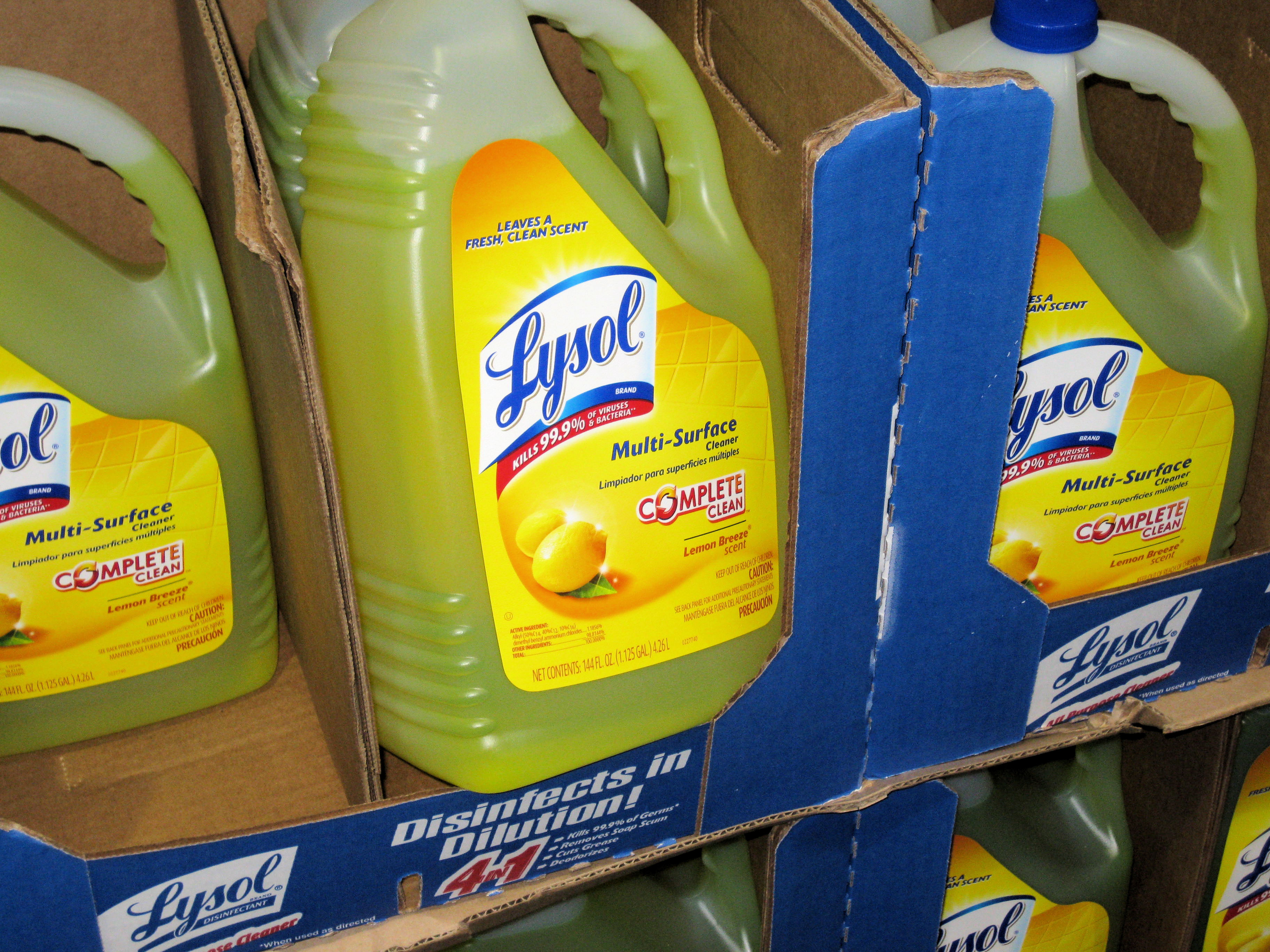
Lysol multi-surface cleaner on a store shelf

Different Lysol products contain different active ingredients. Examples of active ingredients used in Lysol products:

- ethanol/SD alcohol, 40 1–4%; fluid that acts as sanitizer
- isopropyl alcohol, 1–2%; partly responsible for Lysol's strong odor; acts as sanitizing agent and removes odor
- o-Benzyl-p-chorophenol, 5–6%; antiseptic
- o-phenylphenol, 0.1%; antiseptic; in use circa 1980s
- potassium hydroxide, 3–4%
  - Potassium hydroxide is a highly corrosive chemical when used at higher concentrations. It is primarily dangerous to eyes, skin, respiratory tract, and gastrointestinal tract. It can cause serious burns and can be fatal if swallowed. Inhalation, dermal contact, and ingestion are the main forms of exposure. This substance is often found in various bathroom products for hair and skincare, but in a way that maintains and balances the pH level. Potassium hydroxide is not carcinogenic and does not prove to be dangerous for reproductive health.
- alkyl (50% C14, 40% C12, 10% C16) dimethylbenzyl ammonium saccharinate, 0.10%; microbiocide
- alkyl (C12-C18) dimethylbenzylammonium chloride, 0.08%; antiseptic
- alkyl (C12-C16) dimethylbenzylammonium chloride, 0.02%; antiseptic
- lactic acid as an antiseptic
- hydrogen peroxide

=== Health effects and environmental concerns. ===
Lysol Concentrate Disinfectant liquid contains o-Benzyl-p-chorophenol (also known as p-chloro-o-benzylphenol, 2-Benzyl-4-chlorophenol, or chlorophene) at a 5-6% concentration. It is a chemical that is absorbed by animals through ingestion and the mucous membranes. The Globally Harmonized System of Classification of Labelling of Chemicals (GHS) has released hazard statements on P-chloro-o-benzylphenol that include and are not limited to "skin irritation, allergic skin reaction, causes serious eye damage, harmful if inhaled, suspected of causing cancer, suspected of damaging fertility, and potentially causes damage to organs through prolonged or repeated exposure."

One of the active ingredients in many lysol products, benzalkonium chloride, is highly toxic to fish (LC50 = 280 μg ai/L), very highly toxic to aquatic invertebrates (LC50 = 5.9 μg ai/L), moderately toxic to birds (LD50 = 136 mg/kg-bw), and slightly toxic ("safe") to mammals (LD50 = 430 mg/kg-bw).

=== SARS-CoV-2 inactivating capability ===
Per the manufacturer's website, some of Lysol's products "have been tested by an independent third party and approved by the EPA to kill SARS-CoV-2, the cause of COVID-19, on hard, non-porous surfaces". Lysol Disinfectant Spray and Lysol Disinfectant Max were the first two produces the United States Environmental Protection Agency approved after testing directly against the SARS-CoV-2 virus.

== Risk of misuse during COVID-19 pandemic ==
Though Lysol contains disinfecting properties, risks of misuse during the heightened sanitation practices of the COVID-19 pandemic did exist. Overuse, misuse, and improper mixing of disinfectant ingredients can cause both acute and chronic effects.

During the COVID-19 pandemic, more surfaces were being disinfected, such as "touch-screens, plastics, rubber, adhesives, stainless steel and other metals". Acute health effects include coughing, shortness of breath, burning and watery eyes, runny nose, and acute skin irritation. Long-term exposure of fragrances and sanitizers in Lysol can "trigger asthma and allergies".

== Products ==
- Disinfectants: Lysol disinfectant products are used to kill surface and air bacteria. Products include:
  - Lysol Disinfectant Spray: alkyl (50% C14, 40% C12, 10% C16) dimethyl benzyl ammonium saccharinate = 0.10% ethanol = 58.00%, other ingredients = 41.90% (total 100%)
  - Lysol Disinfecting Wipes
  - Lysol Concentrate Disinfectant
  - Lysol Laundry Disinfectant - contains: didecyl-dimethyl ammonium chloride and dimethyl benzyl ammonium chloride - claims effiacy against P. aeruginosa and COVID-19, with 99.99% (one extra "9", compared to most other Lysol products) effectiveness against all viruses and bacteria.
- Cleaners: Lysol distributes several multi-purpose cleaners, kitchen cleaners, and bathroom cleaners. These include:
  - Lysol Power & Free (discontinued)
  - Lysol All-Purpose Cleaner
  - Lysol Multi-Surface Cleaner Pourable
  - Lysol Power Kitchen Cleaner
  - Lysol Bathroom Cleaner
  - Lysol Toilet Bowl Cleaner
  - Lysol Mold & Mildew Remover
- Hand Soaps: Lysol recently developed a line of disinfecting hand soaps. Products include:
  - Lysol No Touch Hand Soap System
  - Lysol Touch of Foam Hand Wash

== Competition ==
Lysol's major competitors include Clorox, Febreze, Tilex, Oust, Mr. Clean and Pine-Sol.

== See also ==
- Bactericide
- Disinfectant
- Misinformation related to the COVID-19 pandemic
- Virucide
