= Benzalkonium saccharinate =

Surfactant and antiseptic agent

Names
- Other names: Alkyldimethylbenzylammonium saccharinate; Onyxide 3300

Identifiers
CAS Number	68989-01-5
3D model (JSmol)	Interactive image
PubChem CID	145864109
- InChI: InChI=1S/C23H42N.C21H38N.C7H5NO3S/c1-4-5-6-7-8-9-10-11-12-13-14-18-21-24(2,3)22-23-19-16-15-17-20-23;1-4-5-6-7-8-9-10-11-12-16-19-22(2,3)20-21-17-14-13-15-18-21;9-7-5-3-1-2-4-6(5)12(10,11)8-7/h15-17,19-20H,4-14,18,21-22H2,1-3H3;13-15,17-18H,4-12,16,19-20H2,1-3H3;1-4H,(H,8,9)/q2*+1;/p-1 Key: MWUHQHMBGSKYNW-UHFFFAOYSA-M
- SMILES: CCCCCCCCCCCCCC[N+](C)(C)CC1=CC=CC=C1.CCCCCCCCCCCC[N+](C)(C)CC1=CC=CC=C1.C1=CC=C2C(=C1)C(=NS2(=O)=O)[O-]

Properties
Chemical formula	C_{51}H_{84}N_{3}O_{3}S
Molar mass	819.3 g/mol
Appearance	White waxy solid
Density	1.05
Melting point	73–75 °C (163–167 °F; 346–348 K)
Solubility in water	Insoluble
Solubility	Soluble in acetone, ethanol, benzene, chloroform, and carbon tetrachloride

Hazards
- GHS labelling
Pictograms	(GHS05: Corrosive) (GHS06: Toxic) (GHS09: Environmental hazard)
Signal word	Danger
Hazard statements	H302, H315, H318, H330, H410
Precautionary statements	P260, P264, P270, P271, P273, P280, P284, P301+P312+P330, P302+P352, P304+P340+P310, P305+P351+P338+P310, P332+P313, P362, P391, P403+P233, P405, P501
NFPA 704 (fire diamond)	3 1 0
Flash point	93.9 °C (201.0 °F; 367.0 K) (Pensky-Martens closed cup)
- Except where otherwise noted, data are given for materials in their standard state (at 25 °C [77 °F], 100 kPa). Infobox references

Benzalkonium saccharinate, also known as alkyldimethylbenzylammonium saccharinate, is a cationic surfactant. It is an organic salt classified as a quaternary ammonium compound. Benzalkonium saccharinate is used as a biocide, disinfectant, preservative, deodorant, antistatic agent, and surfactant. It is a mixture of benzododecinium and myristalkonium cations with a saccharin anion.

== Solubility and physical properties ==
Benzalkonium saccharinate is a white to off-white waxy solid that melts between 73–75 °C (163–167 °F). It is readily soluble in ethanol and acetone, but unlike similar compounds such as benzalkonium chloride, it is insoluble in water.

== Applications ==
Benzalkonium saccharinate is used as an active disinfectant ingredient in many consumer products, including disinfectant sprays, surface cleaners, air fresheners, and laundry treatments sold under the Lysol and Scrubbing Bubbles brands. In the original patent for the compound, the authors claimed it was effective as a bactericide at 1/3 of the concentration required for benzalkonium chloride, and it was about 25% more effective as a fungicide. During the COVID-19 pandemic, products containing benzalkonium saccharinate as the active ingredient were the first to be approved for use against the SARS-CoV-2 virus as a result of direct laboratory testing by the United States Environmental Protection Agency.

== Toxicology ==
In a Canadian regulatory assessment of n-alkyl (40% C12, 50% C14, 10% C16) dimethylbenzylammonium saccharinate, known as Onyxide 3300, it was found to have moderate acute toxicity by the oral route and low acute toxicity via the dermal route in animal studies.

== Preparation ==
Benzalkonium saccharinate was first described in a 1955 patent by Shibe, Cohen, and Frant for the Gallowhur Chemical Corporation. It had been prepared by combining aqueous solutions of benzalkonium chloride and sodium saccharinate to produce a precipitate, and vacuum drying over sodium hydroxide to isolate it.

== See also ==
- Benzalkonium chloride – Surfactant and antiseptic agent
