= Sharklet (material) =

Antibacterial plastic

Sharklet, manufactured by Sharklet Technologies, is a bio-inspired plastic sheet product structured to impede microorganism growth, particularly bacterial growth. It is marketed for use in hospitals and other places with a relatively high potential for bacteria to spread and cause infections.

The inspiration for Sharklet's texture came through analysis of the texture of shark skin, which does not attract barnacles or other biofouling, unlike ship hulls and other smooth surfaces. The texture was later found to also repel microbial activity.

== History ==
Sharklet is a bio-inspired material that was invented by Anthony Brennan, a materials science and engineering professor at the University of Florida, while working to improve antifouling technology for ships and submarines at Pearl Harbor.

Brennan noticed that sharks do not get fouled. He discovered that shark skin denticles are structured in a characteristic diamond-repeating micro-pattern with millions of small ribs at the micrometer scale. His mathematical model for the texture of a substance that would deter microorganisms from settling corresponds to the width-to-height ratio of shark denticle riblets. When compared to smooth surfaces, the first test resulted in an 85% reduction in green algae settlement.

== Stress gradient ==
Adherence prevention and translocation restriction have been demonstrated and are believed to significantly reduce the risk of device-associated infections. Sharklet's topography creates mechanical stress on settling bacteria, a phenomenon known as mechanotransduction. The surface variations induce stress gradients within the plane, which disrupt normal cell functions, forcing the microorganism to adjust its contact area on each topographical feature to equalize the stresses. Sharklet is made, however, with the same material as other plastics.

Sharklet micro-patterns can be incorporated onto the surfaces of a variety of medical devices during the manufacturing process. Sharklet micro-patterns have been tested to control the bio-adhesion of marine microorganisms, pathogenic bacteria, and eukaryotic cells. They reduce S. aureus and S. epidermidis colonization in a simulated vascular environment by around 70% when compared to smooth controls. This micro-pattern similarly reduces platelet adhesion and fibrin sheath formation by approximately 80%. An in vitro study found that it reduced the colonization of S. aureus and P. aeruginosa bacterial pathogens in a central venous catheters-relevant thermoplastic polyurethane.

== See also ==
- Antimicrobial polymer
- Bioinspiration
- Micropatterning
- Nanomaterial
- Shark skin
