= Polyethylenimine =

Names
- IUPAC name Poly(iminoethylene)
- Other names Polyaziridine, Poly[imino(1,2-ethanediyl)]

Identifiers
CAS Number	9002-98-6
ChemSpider	none
ECHA InfoCard	100.123.818
CompTox Dashboard (EPA)	DTXSID1051272

Properties
Chemical formula	(C_{2}H_{5}N)_{n}, linear form
Molar mass	43.04 (repeat unit), mass of polymer variable
- Except where otherwise noted, data are given for materials in their standard state (at 25 °C [77 °F], 100 kPa). verify (what is ?) Infobox references

Polyethylenimine (PEI) or polyaziridine is a polymer with repeating units composed of the amine group and two carbon aliphatic CH_{2}CH_{2} spacers. Linear polyethyleneimines contain all secondary amines, in contrast to branched PEIs which contain primary, secondary and tertiary amino groups. Totally branched, dendrimeric forms were also reported. PEI is produced on an industrial scale and finds many applications usually derived from its polycationic character.

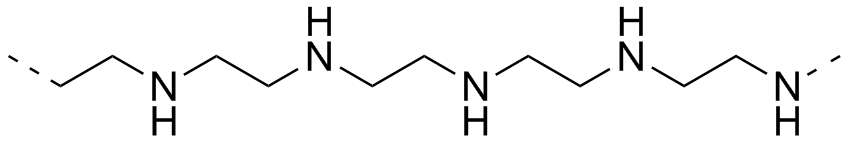
Linear PEI fragment

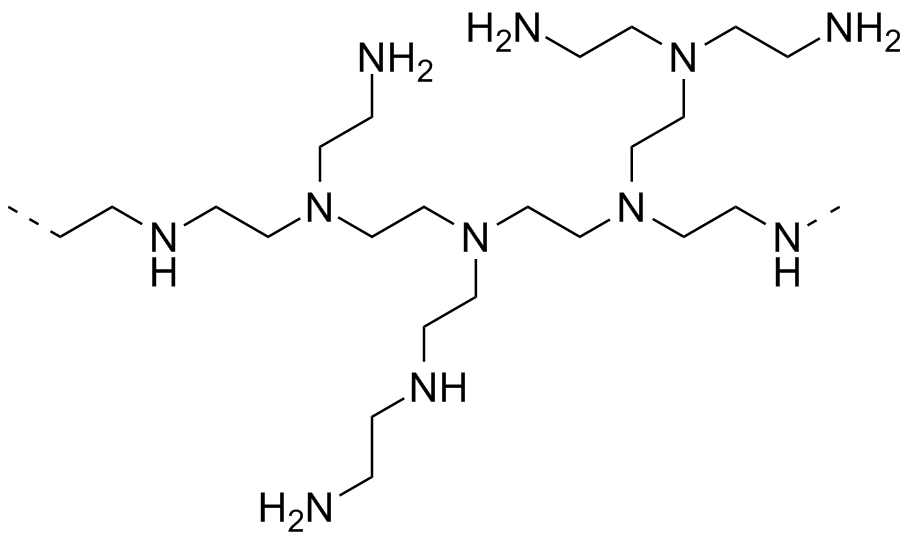
Typical branched PEI fragment

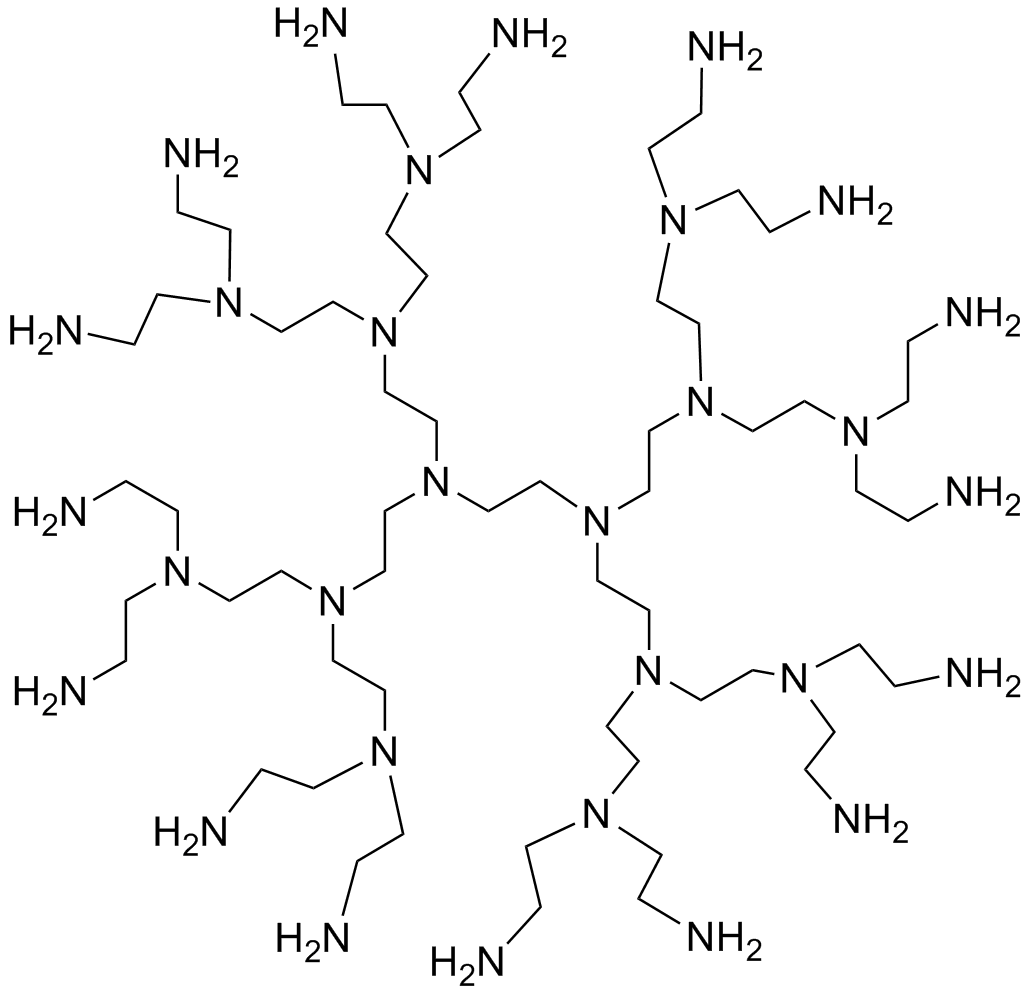
PEI dendrimer generation 4

== Properties ==
The linear PEI is a semi-crystalline solid at room temperature while branched PEI is a fully amorphous polymer existing as a liquid at all molecular weights. Linear polyethylenimine is soluble in hot water, at low pH, in methanol, ethanol, or chloroform. It is insoluble in cold water, benzene, ethyl ether, and acetone. Linear polyethylenimine has a melting point of around 67 °C. Both linear and branched polyethylenimine can be stored at room temperature. Linear polyethylenimine is able to form cryogels upon freezing and subsequent thawing of its aqueous solutions.

== Synthesis ==
Branched PEI can be synthesized by the ring opening polymerization of aziridine. Depending on the reaction conditions different degree of branching can be achieved. Linear PEI is available by post-modification of other polymers like poly(2-oxazolines) or N-substituted polyaziridines. Linear PEI was synthesised by the hydrolysis of poly(2-ethyl-2-oxazoline) and sold as jetPEI. The current generation in-vivo-jetPEI uses bespoke poly(2-ethyl-2-oxazoline) polymers as precursors.

== Applications ==
Polyethyleneimine finds many applications in products like: detergents, adhesives, water treatment agents and cosmetics. Owing to its ability to modify the surface of cellulose fibres, PEI is employed as a wet-strength agent in the paper-making process. It is also used as flocculating agent with silica sols and as a chelating agent with the ability to complex metal ions such as zinc and zirconium. There are also other highly specialized PEI applications:

=== Biology ===
PEI has a number of uses in laboratory biology, especially tissue culture, but is also toxic to cells if used in excess. Toxicity is by two different mechanisms, the disruption of the cell membrane leading to necrotic cell death (immediate) and disruption of the mitochondrial membrane after internalisation leading to apoptosis (delayed).

==== Attachment promoter ====
Polyethyleneimines are used in the cell culture of weakly anchoring cells to increase attachment. PEI is a cationic polymer; the negatively charged outer surfaces of cells are attracted to dishes coated in PEI, facilitating stronger attachments between the cells and the plate.

==== Transfection reagent ====
Poly(ethylenimine) was the second polymeric transfection agent discovered, after poly-L-lysine. PEI condenses DNA into positively charged particles, which bind to anionic cell surface residues and are brought into the cell via endocytosis. Once inside the cell, protonation of the amines results in an influx of counter-ions and a lowering of the osmotic potential. Osmotic swelling results and bursts the vesicle releasing the polymer-DNA complex (polyplex) into the cytoplasm. If the polyplex unpacks then the DNA is free to diffuse to the nucleus.

==== Permeabilization of gram negative bacteria ====
Poly(ethylenimine) is also an effective permeabilizer of the outer membrane of Gram-negative bacteria.

=== CO_{2} capture ===
Both linear and branched polyethylenimine have been used for CO_{2} capture, frequently impregnated over porous materials. First use of PEI polymer in CO_{2} capture was devoted to improve the CO_{2} removal in space craft applications, impregnated over a polymeric matrix. After that, the support was changed to MCM-41, an hexagonal mesostructured silica, and large amounts of PEI were retained in the so-called "molecular basket". MCM-41-PEI adsorbent materials led to higher CO_{2} adsorption capacities than bulk PEI or MCM-41 material individually considered. The authors claim that, in this case, a synergic effect takes place due to the high PEI dispersion inside the pore structure of the material. As a result of this improvement, further works were developed to study more in depth the behaviour of these materials. Exhaustive works have been focused on the CO_{2} adsorption capacity as well as the CO_{2}/O_{2} and CO_{2}/N_{2} adsorption selectivity of several MCM-41-PEI materials with PEI polymers. Also, PEI impregnation has been tested over different supports such as a glass fiber matrix and monoliths. However, for an appropriate performance under real conditions in post-combustion capture (mild temperatures between 45-75 °C and the presence of moisture) it is necessary to use thermally and hydrothermally stable silica materials, such as SBA-15, which also presents an hexagonal mesostructure. Moisture and real world conditions have also been tested when using PEI-impregnated materials to adsorb CO_{2} from the air.

A detailed comparison among PEI and other amino-containing molecules showed an excellent performance of PEI-containing samples with cycles. Also, only a slight decrease was registered in their CO_{2} uptake when increasing the temperature from 25 to 100 °C, demonstrating a high contribution of chemisorption to the adsorption capacity of these solids. For the same reason, the adsorption capacity under diluted CO_{2} was up to 90% of the value under pure CO_{2} and also, a high unwanted selectivity towards SO_{2} was observed. Lately, many efforts have been made in order to improve PEI diffusion within the porous structure of the support used. A better dispersion of PEI and a higher CO_{2} efficiency (CO_{2}/NH molar ratio) were achieved by impregnating a template-occluded PE-MCM-41 material rather than perfect cylindrical pores of a calcined material, following a previously described route. The combined use of organosilanes such as aminopropyl-trimethoxysilane, AP, and PEI has also been studied. The first approach used a combination of them to impregnate porous supports, achieving faster CO_{2}-adsorption kinetics and higher stability during reutilization cycles, but no higher efficiencies. A novel method is the so-called "double-functionalization". It is based on the impregnation of materials previously functionalized by grafting (covalent bonding of organosilanes). Amino groups incorporated by both paths have shown synergic effects, achieving high CO_{2} uptakes up to 235 mg CO_{2}/g (5.34 mmol CO_{2}/g). CO_{2} adsorption kinetics were also studied for these materials, showing similar adsorption rates as impregnated solids. This is an interesting finding, taking into account the smaller pore volume available in double-functionalized materials. Thus, it can be also concluded that their higher CO_{2} uptake and efficiency compared to impregnated solids can be ascribed to a synergic effect of the amino groups incorporated by two methods (grafting and impregnation) rather than to a faster adsorption kinetics.

=== Low work function modifier for electronics ===
Poly(ethylenimine) and poly(ethylenimine) ethoxylated (PEIE) have been shown as effective low-work function modifiers for organic electronics by Zhou and Kippelen et al. It could universally reduce the work function of metals, metal oxides, conducting polymers and graphene, and so on. It is very important that low-work function solution-processed conducting polymer could be produced by the PEI or PEIE modification. Based on this discovery, the polymers have been widely used for organic solar cells, organic light-emitting diodes, organic field-effect transistors, perovskite solar cells, perovskite light-emitting diodes, quantum-dot solar cells and light-emitting diodes etc.

=== Use in delivery of HIV-gene therapies ===
Polyethylenimine (PEI), a cationic polymer, has been widely studied and shown great promise as an efficient gene delivery vehicle. Likewise, the HIV-1 Tat peptide, a cell-permeable peptide, has been successfully used for intracellular gene delivery.

== See also ==
- Tetraethylenepentamine
- Ethylenediamine
- Polyetherimide (Also goes by PEI)
- Polyimine
