= 3-O-Methylfunicone =

Names
- Preferred IUPAC name Methyl 3,5-dimethoxy-2-{5-methoxy-4-oxo-6-[(1E)-prop-1-en-1-yl]-4H-pyran-3-carbonyl}benzoate

Identifiers
CAS Number	28403-06-7
3D model (JSmol)	Interactive image
ChEMBL	ChEMBL3593571
ChemSpider	8723692
PubChem CID	10548301
CompTox Dashboard (EPA)	DTXSID801045493
- InChI: InChI=1S/C20H20O8/c1-6-7-14-19(26-4)18(22)13(10-28-14)17(21)16-12(20(23)27-5)8-11(24-2)9-15(16)25-3/h6-10H,1-5H3/b7-6+ Key: WGLRJONCGNNMKL-VOTSOKGWSA-N; InChI=1/C20H20O8/c1-6-7-14-19(26-4)18(22)13(10-28-14)17(21)16-12(20(23)27-5)8-11(24-2)9-15(16)25-3/h6-10H,1-5H3/b7-6+ Key: WGLRJONCGNNMKL-VOTSOKGWBV
- SMILES: C/C=C/c1c(c(=O)c(co1)C(=O)c2c(cc(cc2OC)OC)C(=O)OC)OC

Properties
Chemical formula	C_{20}H_{20}O_{8}
Molar mass	388.368 g/mol
- Except where otherwise noted, data are given for materials in their standard state (at 25 °C [77 °F], 100 kPa). Infobox references

3-O-Methylfunicone is a chemical compound isolated from Penicillium pinophilum. It inhibits the growth of phytopathogenic fungi.
