= Santa Barbara Amorphous-15 =

Silica-based ordered mesoporous material

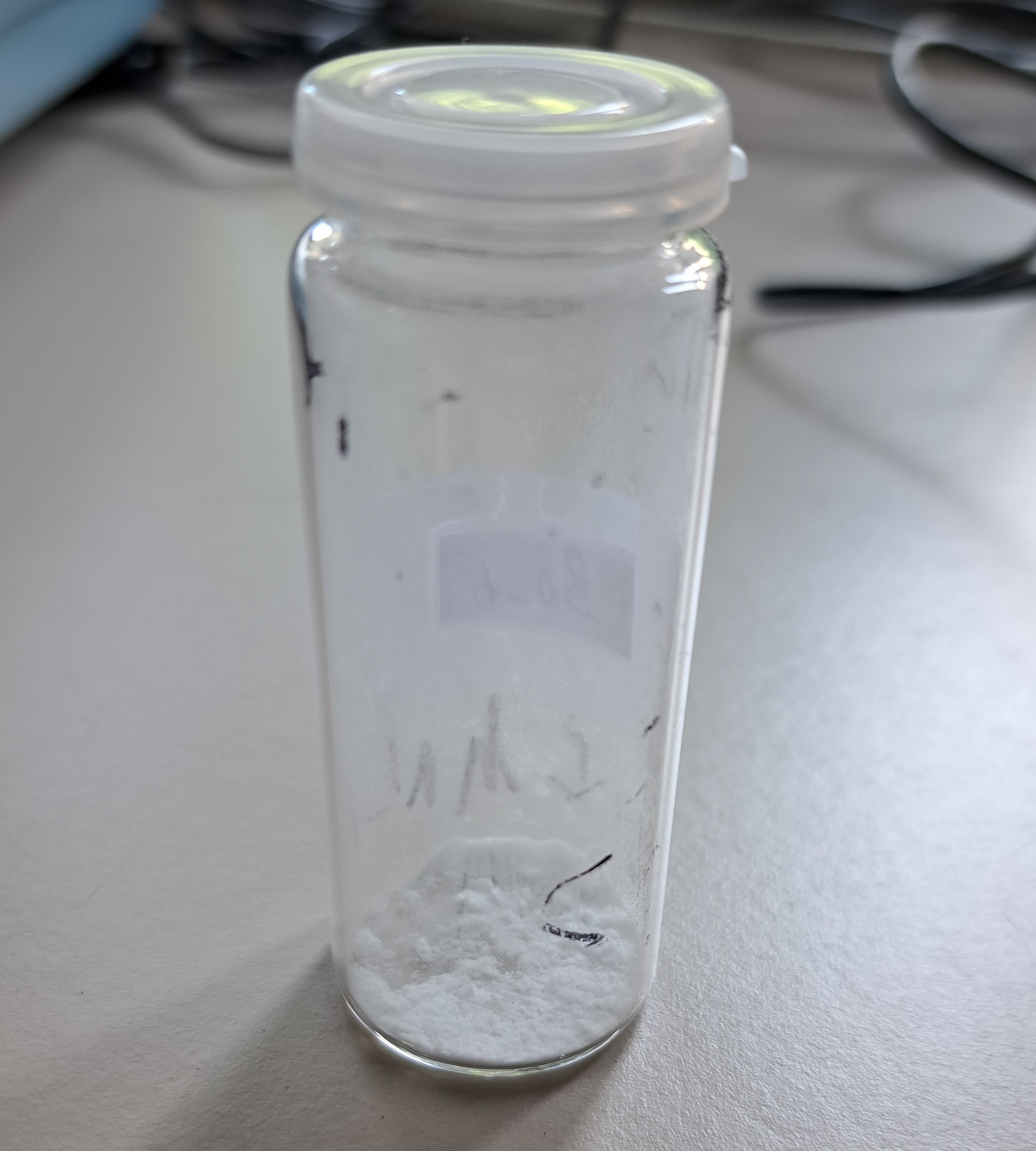
Typical SBA-15 powder sample

Santa Barbara Amorphous-15 (SBA-15), is a silica-based ordered mesoporous material. It was first synthesized in 1998 by researchers at the University of California, Santa Barbara. This material proved important for scientists in various fields, such as material sciences, drug delivery, catalysis, fuel cells and many other due to its desirable properties and ease of production.

== Synthesis procedure ==
The procedure is a typical liquid crystal templating that consists of three steps:

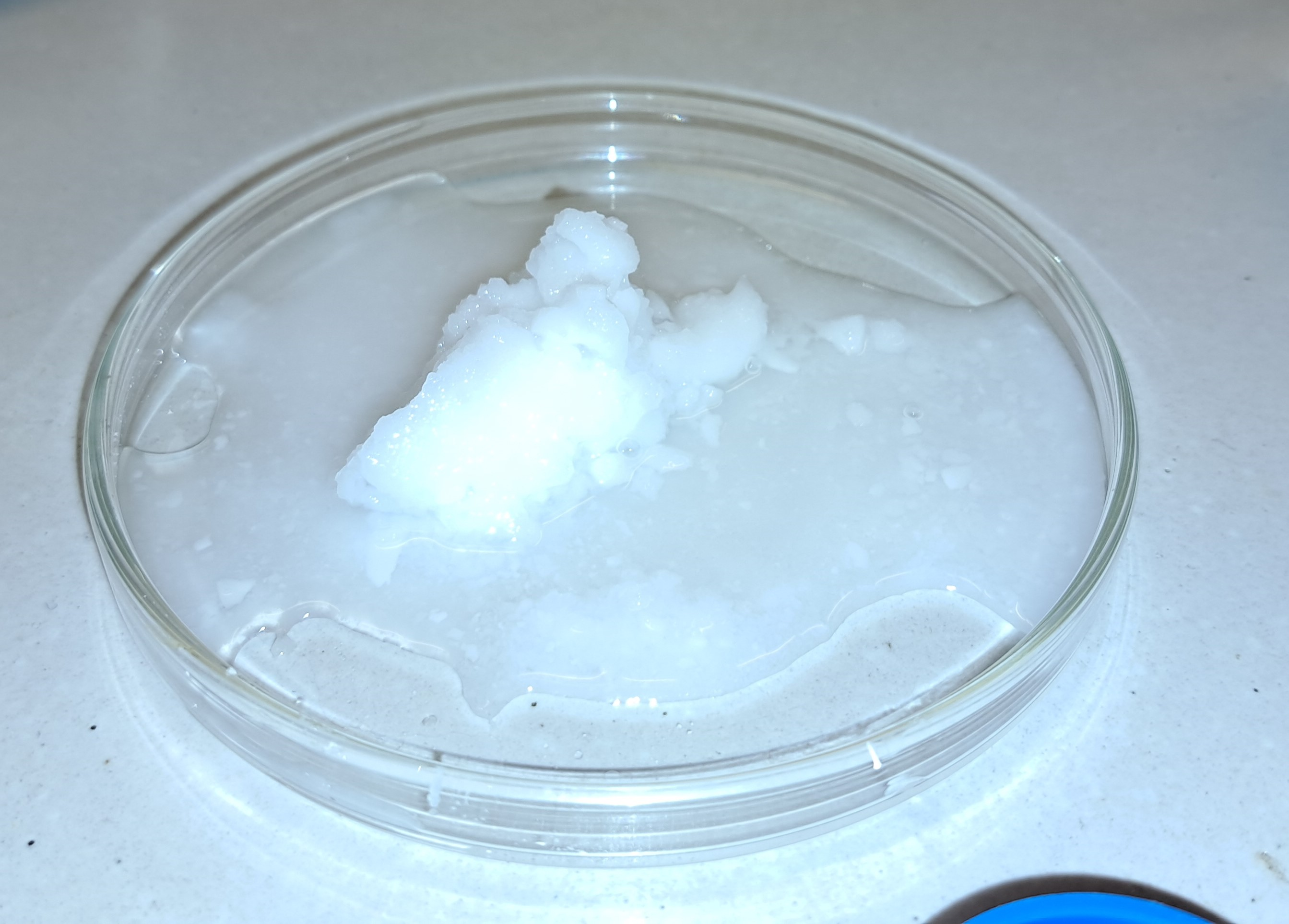
The gel obtained in the second synthesis phase

1. Solution preparation: The triblock copolymer Pluronic P123 is dissolved in an acidic aqueous solution. A silica precursor, such as tetraethyl orthosilicate (TEOS) or tetramethyl orthosilicate (TMOS), is added to the solution and stirred.
2. Hydrothermal treatment: The solution is sealed in a container and subjected to a temperature T1 for about 24 hours and then a higher temperature T2 for 48 hours.
3. Washing and calcination: The gel obtained from the previous step is washed with water and ethanol under centrifuging, and finally calcinated at about 550 °C for 6 hours.

== Structure ==
SBA-15 possesses a mesoporous structure. According to the IUPAC definition, mesopores range from 2 to 50 nm in diameter. In SBA-15, these pores are cylindrical and arranged in a hexagonal pattern aligning with its relatively thick pore walls, giving it thermal stability.

The sorption isotherms of these materials demonstrate typical hysteretic behavior. The causes of this behavior is still under discussion.

=== TEM ===
The transmission electron microscopy of the sample shows the cylindrical pores but also highlights the fact that the pores of this material exhibit geometric deformations.

=== SAXS ===
The small-angle X-ray scattering pattern shows typical Bragg peaks to the hexagonal structure of the material. The peak positions are directly related to the lattice parameter.

$q_{hk} = \frac{4 \pi}{a \sqrt{3}} \sqrt{h^2 + k^2 + hk}$

where h and k are the miller indices.

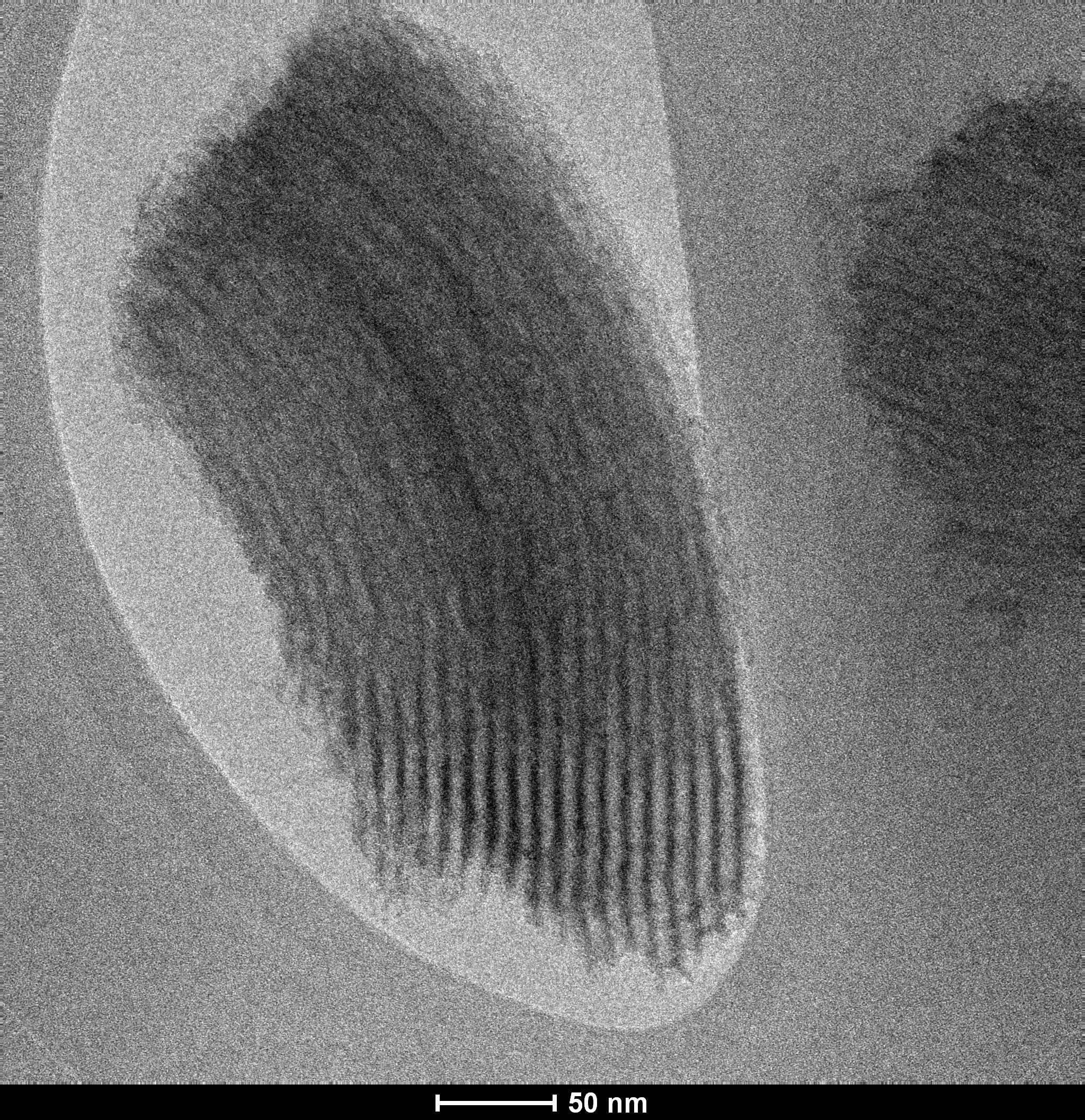
TEM of a typical SBA-15 sample

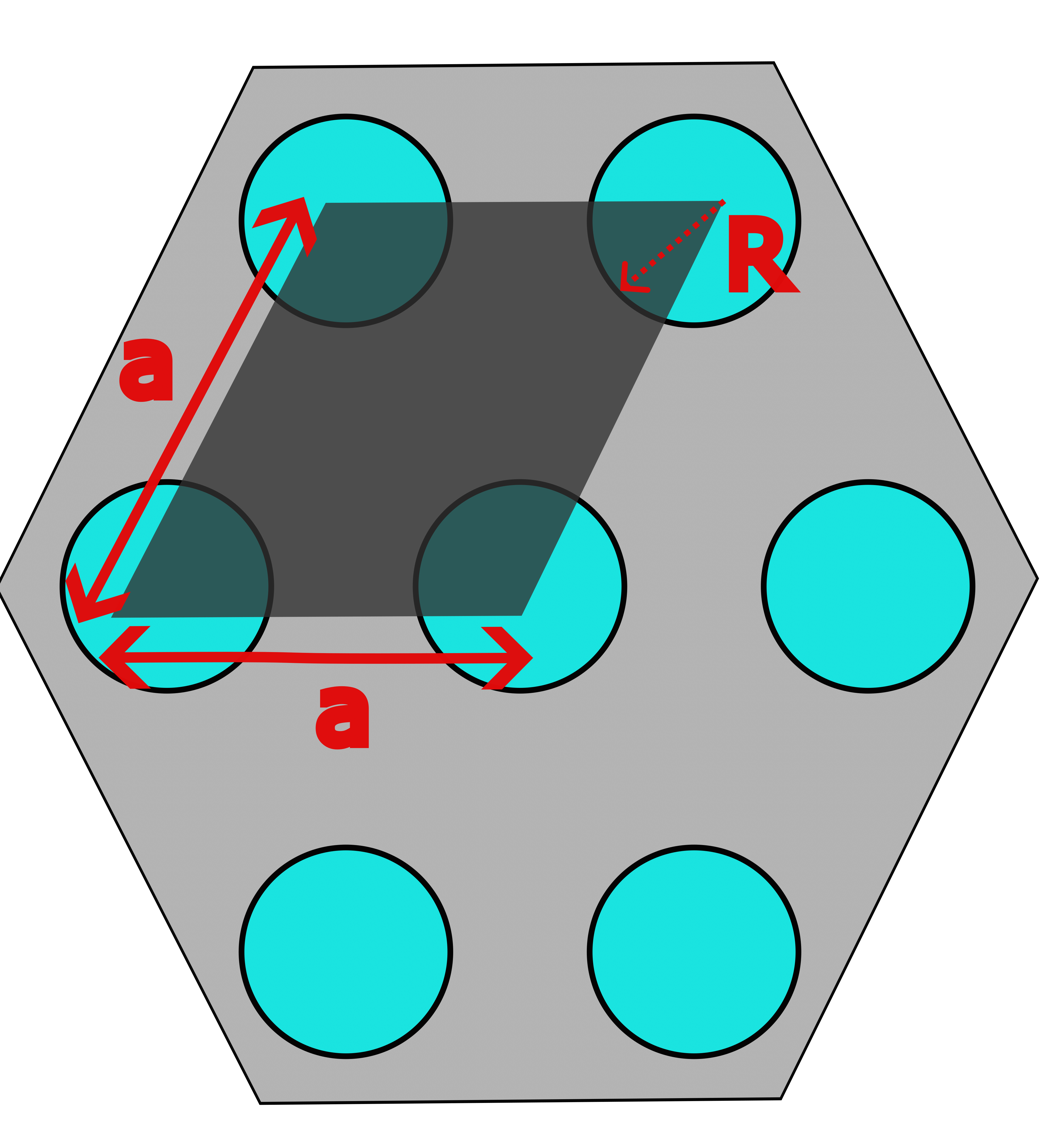
Demonstration of the hexagonal structure of SBA-15

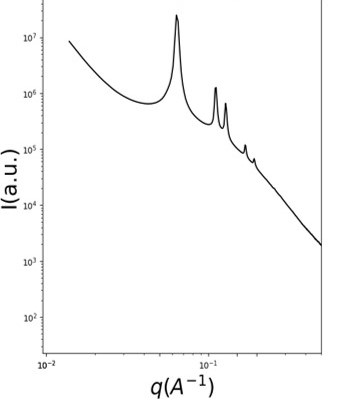
Small angle x-ray scattering pattern of a SBA-15 sample (data from Haidar et al.)

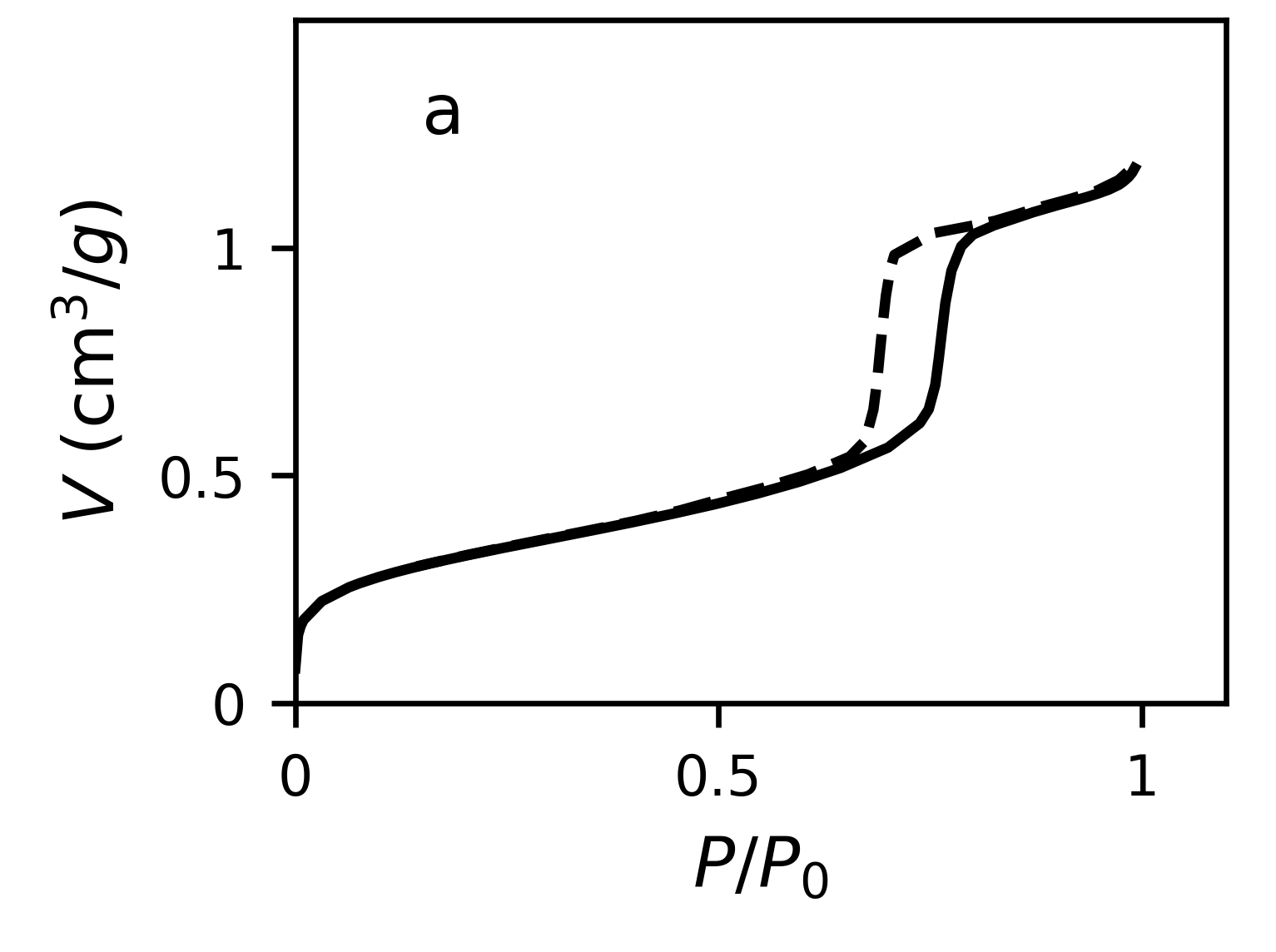
Typical isotherm SBA-15 sample (data from Haidar et al.)
