= Penicillium pinophilum =

Scientific classification
- Kingdom: Fungi
- Division: Ascomycota
- Class: Eurotiomycetes
- Order: Eurotiales
- Family: Aspergillaceae
- Genus: Penicillium
- Species: P. pinophilum

Binomial name
- Penicillium pinophilum Thom, C. 1910

Type strain
- ATCC 36839, CBMAI 541, CBS 631.66, CCT 1208, CCUG 26805, CEB 3296.31, CECT 2809, CECT 2911, CMI 114993, DSM 1944, DSMZ 1944, IAM 7013, IFO 33285, IHEM 16004, IMI 114933, IMI 114993, JCM 5594, KCTC 16057, MUCL 38548, NBRC 100533, NBRC 33285

Synonyms
- Talaromyces pinophilus

Species of fungus

Penicillium pinophilum is a species of fungus in the genus Penicillium which was isolated from a radio set in Papua New Guinea. Penicillium pinophilum produces 3-O-methylfunicone and mycophenolic acid
