= FDU materials =

FDU Materials are a class of regularly structured mesoporous organic materials first synthesized at Fudan University in Shanghai, China (hence FDU). FDU-14 -15 and -16 are formed by polymerizing resol around a lyotropic liquid crystal template and then removing the template by calcination.

== Notes ==
- Denyuan Zhao et al. Angew. Chem. Int. Ed. 2005, 44, 7053
