= Enterococcus hirae =

Scientific classification
- Domain: Bacteria
- Kingdom: Bacillati
- Phylum: Bacillota
- Class: Bacilli
- Order: Lactobacillales
- Family: Enterococcaceae
- Genus: Enterococcus
- Species: E. hirae

Binomial name
- Enterococcus hirae Farrow & Collins, 1985

Species of bacterium

Enterococcus hirae is a species of Enterococcus. Its type strain is NCDO 1258. It is involved in growth depression in young chickens and endocarditis and sepsis in humans.
