= Polyaminopropyl biguanide =

Names
- Other names Polyamine-propyl-biguanidine

Identifiers
CAS Number	133029-32-0
Abbreviations	PAPB
ChemSpider	none
ECHA InfoCard	100.118.649
UNII	DT9D8Z79ET

Properties
Chemical formula	(C_{5}H_{11}N_{5})_{n}
- Except where otherwise noted, data are given for materials in their standard state (at 25 °C [77 °F], 100 kPa). verify (what is ?) Infobox references

Polyaminopropyl biguanide (PAPB) is a polymer containing biguanide group connected with a three methylene (propyl) linker. The polymer is a propyl analogue of polyhexamethylene biguanide. The polymer displays some antibacterial activity, although much lower than PHMB. As of May 2024, PAPB is not approved as a biocidal active substance under EU regulations.

== Name controversy ==
In some sources, particularly in lists of cosmetic ingredients (INCI), the name polyaminopropyl biguanide is wrongly associated with polyhexamethylene biguanide (PHMB)
