= Liquorice (disambiguation) =

Liquorice or licorice is the root of Glycyrrhiza glabra from which a somewhat sweet flavor can be extracted.

Liquorice or licorice may also refer to:

- Liquorice (confectionery), a confectionery flavoured with the extract of the root
- Licorice McKechnie, a Scottish musician
- Licorice (gamer), the handle of professional League of Legends player Eric Ritchie
- Liquorice (album), by Hatchie
- "Liquorice" (song), by Azealia Banks
- Licorice (EP), by Snowden
- L.I.C.O.R.I.C.E., an episode of the television series Codename: Kids Next Door
- Lord Licorice, the main antagonist in the Candy Land board game series
- Licorice (also known as Princess Licorice), a fictional character from the web-comic Sugar Bits

== Plants ==
- Glycyrrhiza, the genus including G. glabra
  - Glycyrrhiza echinata, Chinese licorice, German liquorice, or other names
  - Glycyrrhiza inflata, Chinese licorice
  - Glycyrrhiza lepidota, American licorice
  - Glycyrrhiza uralensis, Chinese licorice
- Polypodium glycyrrhiza, liquorice fern

== See also ==
- All pages with titles containing "licorice" or "liquorice"
