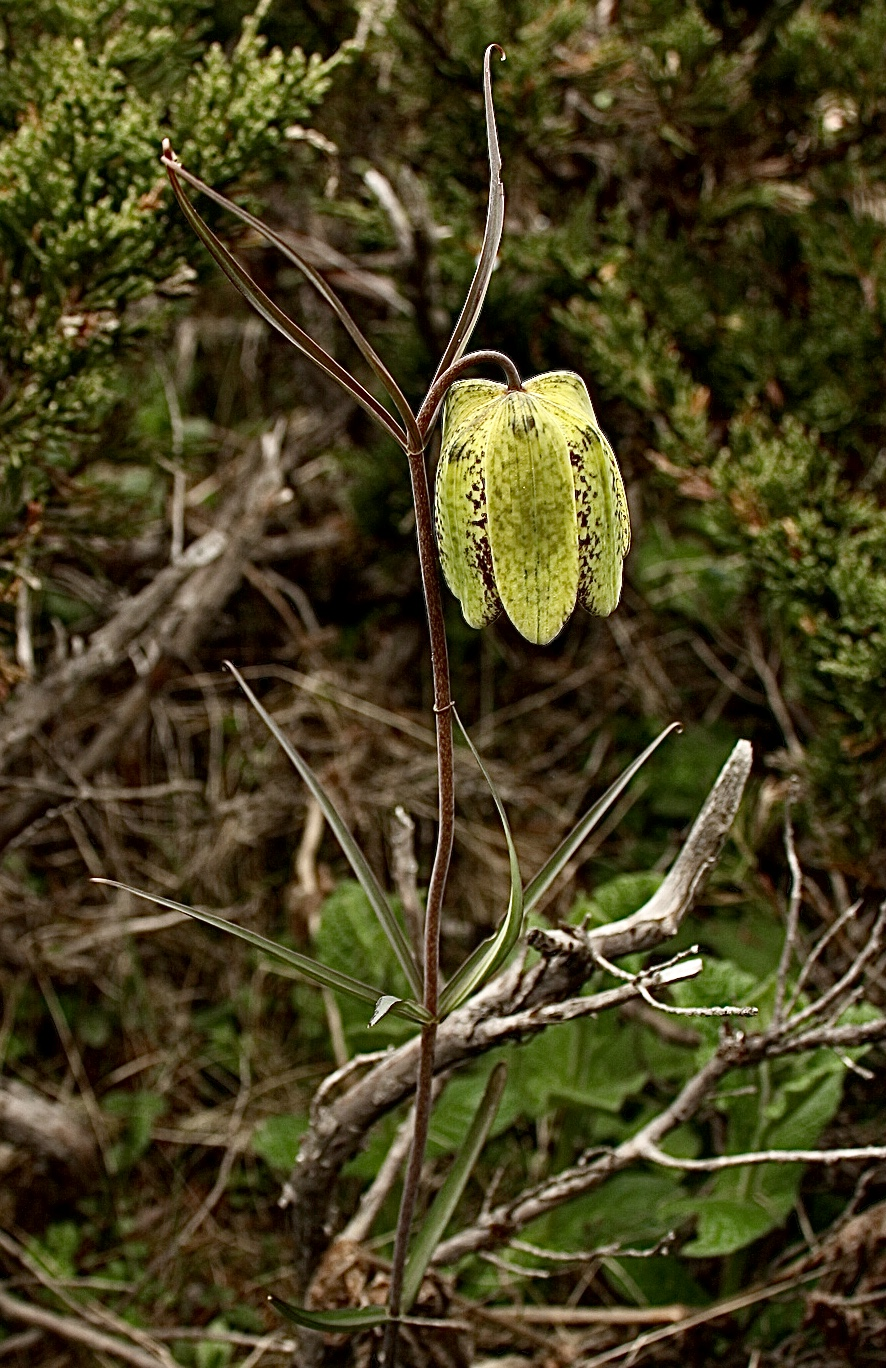

Scientific classification
- Kingdom: Plantae
- Clade: Tracheophytes
- Clade: Angiosperms
- Clade: Monocots
- Order: Liliales
- Family: Liliaceae
- Subfamily: Lilioideae
- Genus: Fritillaria
- Species: F. cirrhosa

Binomial name
- Fritillaria cirrhosa D.Don

Synonyms
- Synonymy: Baimo cirrhosa (D.Don) Raf.; Fritillaria cirrhosa var. bonatii (H.Lév.) S.C.Chen; Fritillaria cirrhosa var. brachyantha C.Marquand & Airy Shaw; Fritillaria cirrhosa var. dingriensis Y.K.Yang & J.Z.Zhang; Fritillaria cirrhosa var. jilongensis Y.K. Yang & Gesan; Fritillaria cirrhosa subsp. roylei (Hook.) Ali; Fritillaria cirrhosa var. viridiflava S.C.Chen; Fritillaria duilongdeqingensis Y.K.Yang & Gesan; Fritillaria gulielmi-waldemarii Klotzsch; Fritillaria lhiinzeensis Y.K.Yang & al.; Fritillaria polyphylla Fortune; Fritillaria roylei Hook.; Fritillaria zhufenensis Y.K.Yang & J.Z.Zhang; Lilium bonatii H.Lév.; Melorima cirrhosa (D.Don) Raf.

= Fritillaria cirrhosa =

Species of flowering plant

Fritillaria cirrhosa, common name yellow Himalayan fritillary, is an Asian species of herbaceous plant in the lily family, native to China (Gansu, Qinghai, Sichuan, Tibet, Yunnan), the Indian subcontinent (Nepal, Pakistan, India, Bhutan), and Myanmar. It is in danger of extinction, due to be being aggressively collected to make a traditional Chinese medicine, Bulbus fritillariae cirrhosae or Chuan-bei-mu. It is a Class III protected species in China's National Protected Medicinal Plants Red-List

== Morphology ==
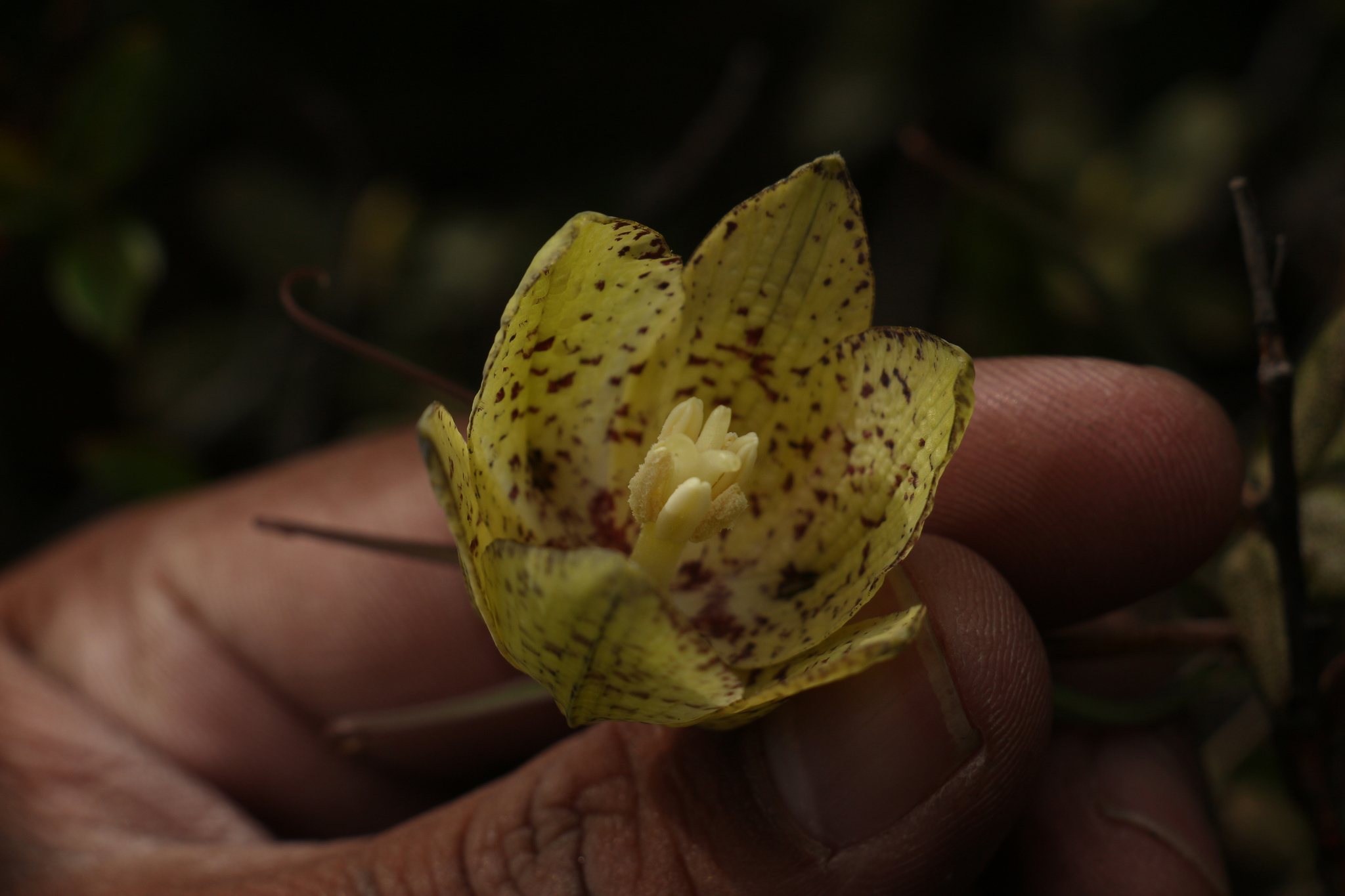
Front facing closeup of Fritillaria cirrhosa

Fritillaria cirrhosa produces bulbs up to 20 mm (0.8 in) in diameter. The stem is up to 60 cm (24 in) tall, usually with one flower at the top, sometimes two or three. Leaves are narrowly lanceolate, usually opposite, sometimes whorled, up to 13 cm (5.1 in) long. Flowers are bell-shaped, flowers have yellowish-green to brownish-purple tepals, usually with a checkered pattern in dull purple and developed nectaries. Stamens can be 3 cm (1.8 in) long with slightly papillose, or bumpy, filaments. Fruit is a capsule with narrow wings that are 1.5 mm wide.

It is perennial and flowers May through July. They can reproduce sexually and asexually, but its form of breeding is rarely reported on and has been said to be outcrossed through seed dispersal by wind or water.

== Habitat ==
The plant is commonly found in alpine slopes and shrublands of the Himalayas, at altitudes of 2,700–4,000 m (9,000–13,000 ft). They are also found in moist places like flood lands, and other areas such as meadows, forests, and alpine thickets.

== Taxonomy ==
=== Etymology ===
It was first published and described in the "Prodromus Florae Nepalensis 51" by David Don in 1825. Fritillaria is the genus name which comes from the Latin word fritillus, meaning dice box in reference to the typical checkered box pattern of the genera. Cirrhosa comes from the Latin words cirrh, curls/tendrils, and os, plenty, meaning with lots of tendrils, curls.

=== Formerly included ===
Several names have been coined at infraspecific levels (variety, subspecies, and form) for plants once believed to belong to Fritillaria cirrhosa. None of these is currently recognized. Some of the names are regarded as synonyms of Fritillaria cirrhosa not deserving recognition (see synonym list at right). A few others are considered as belonging to distinct species. Those are:

- Fritillaria cirrhosa var. brevistigma, now called Fritillaria yuzhongensis
- Fritillaria cirrhosa var. ecirrhosa, now called Fritillaria sichuanica
- Fritillaria cirrhosa f. glabra, now called Fritillaria taipaiensis

== Properties ==
=== Phytochemistry ===
Fritillaria cirrhosa contains steroidal alkaloids, nucleosides, and terpenoids. Several alkaloids, like peiminine and sepeimine, extracted from the bulbs have been proven to have anti-inflammatory, antitussive, expectorant, anti-cancer and sedative effects. Other alkaloids like imperialine, chuanbeinone, verticinone, and verticine found and isolated in the bulbs are likely contributing to these effects.

=== Uses ===
Similarly to other members of the Fritillaria genus, Fritillaria cirrhosa is mainly used in Chinese medicine, specifically its bulbs. Its suppliers are located in China and Nepal, with 46 suppliers in total for 210 products. For centuries, the bulbs have been used for coughs and asthma not only because of its therapeutic effects and alkaloids, but its small amount of side effects. They are used as an ingredient in common cough syrups, such as in the Chinese medicine "Nin Jiom Pei Pa Koa Herbal Cough & Throat Syrup", and usually this is in large amounts even after being transported to different countries, who typically alter the formula. Various other uses are administered through powder from the dried bulb which treat colds, pneumonia, tuberculosis, throat swelling and lung infection. These traditional herbal medicines are also found and used in Canada, Australia, Hong-Kong, Malaysia, Republic of Korea, Singapore and Taiwan.

However, it is also used in foods and even in ritual and religious practices through offerings of the dry plant in the Nepal Himalaya. It is also used as a snake bite antidote in the Tibetan plateau and Ladakh.

== Cultivation ==
Domestication and cultivation of Fritillaria cirrhosa is difficult due to needing specific habitat conditions, meaning majority of its cultivation comes from the wild. This cultivation of the wild Fritillaria cirrhosa has led to a decrease in its population, putting it near extinction because of over-harvesting and over-grazing. They are largely harvested in the western Sichuan Province.

Conservation matters are attempted to be made, such as in the western Sichuan Province. Similarly, populations in areas like the Yunnan Plateau are important for conservation because of the high genetic diversity in the area. There have been successful cultivations in the Kangding county, which can likely lead to a decrease of harvesting of the wild populations.
