= Baihe Gujin Wan =

Pill used in Traditional Chinese medicine

Baihe Gujin Wan (Chinese: 百合固金丸, pinyin: bǎihégù jīnwán ) is a blackish-brown honeyed pill used in Traditional Chinese medicine to "nourish yin of the lung, resolve phlegm and relieve cough". It is used when there is "deficiency of yin of the lung and the kidney marked by dry cough, scanty expectoration, bloody sputum, dryness and pain in the throat". Honey is added as a binding agent to make the pill.

== Chinese classic herbal formula ==
Name	Chinese (S)	Grams
Bulbus Lilii	百合	100
Radix Rehmanniae	生地黄	200
Radix Rehmanniae Preparata	熟地黄	300
Radix Ophiopogonis	麦冬	150
Radix Scrophulariae	玄参	80
Bulbus fritillariae cirrhosae	川贝母	100
Radix Angelicae Sinensis	当归	100
Radix Paeoniae Albae	白芍	100
Radix Platycodonis	桔梗	80
Radix Glycyrrhizae	甘草	100

== See also ==
- Chinese classic herbal formula
- Bu Zhong Yi Qi Wan
