= Retrochalcone =

A retrochalcone is a chalcone-like compound in which the normally present hydroxy groups at the 2' and 6' positions are missing. The retrochalcone structure has a propenal bridge connected to two benzene rings at each end. The ring closest to the oxygen, is labelled with primed numbers, normally with a hydroxy group at the 4' position. This is the A ring. The ring closest to the double bond is numbered with simple digits starting from 1 at the bridge connection. This is the B ring. There is usually a hydroxy group at the 4 position. The retrochalcones are found naturally where they are derivatives of flavones. Retrochalcones can be classed as minor flavonoids.

One example derivative is echinatin. It has systematic name (E)-1-(4-hydroxyphenol)-3-(3-methoxy-4-hydroxyphenol)-2-propen-1-one, or derived name 2′,4′-dihydroxy-4-methoxychalcone and was found in Glycyrrhiza echinata.

== List ==
- Licochalcone A (E)-3-[4-hydroxy-2-methoxy-5-(2-methylbut-3-en-2-yl)phenyl]-1-(4-hydroxyphenyl)prop-2-en-1-one
- Licochalcone B
- Licochalcone C
- Licochalcone D
- Licochalcone E (E)-3-[4-hydroxy-2-methoxy-5-[(2S)-3-methylbut-3-en-2-yl]phenyl]-1-(4-hydroxyphenyl)prop-2-en-1-one
- tepanone ((2E)-1-phenyl-3-(2´-hydroxy-3´,4´,6´-trimethoxyphenyl)prop-2-enone
