= P. albiflora =

P. albiflora may refer to:

- Paeonia albiflora, a synonym of Paeonia lactiflora
- Polytaenia albiflora, a flowering plant endemic to the Edwards Plateau
