= Bulbus fritillariae cirrhosae =

From Fritillaria plants

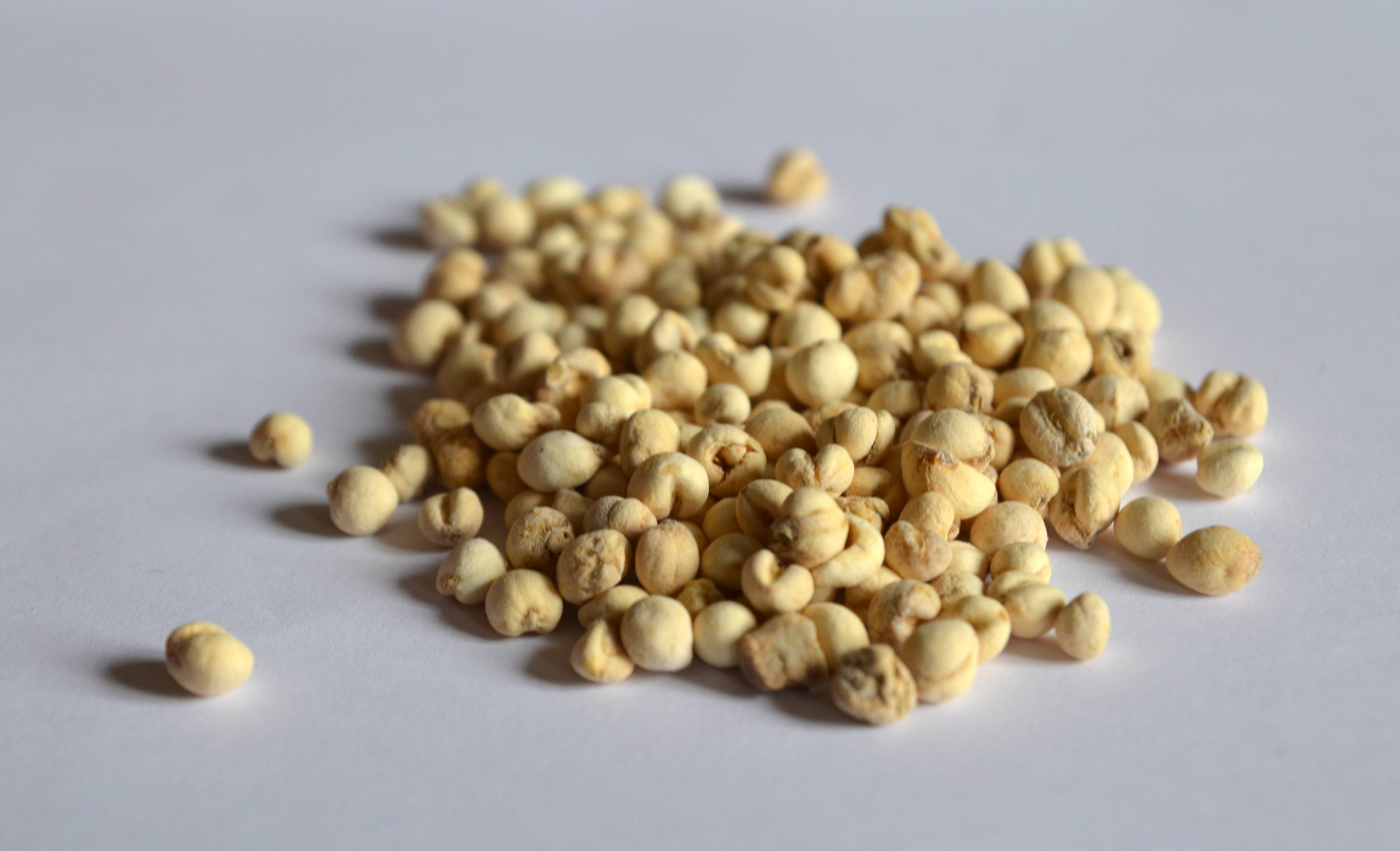
Dried bulbus fritillariae cirrhosae

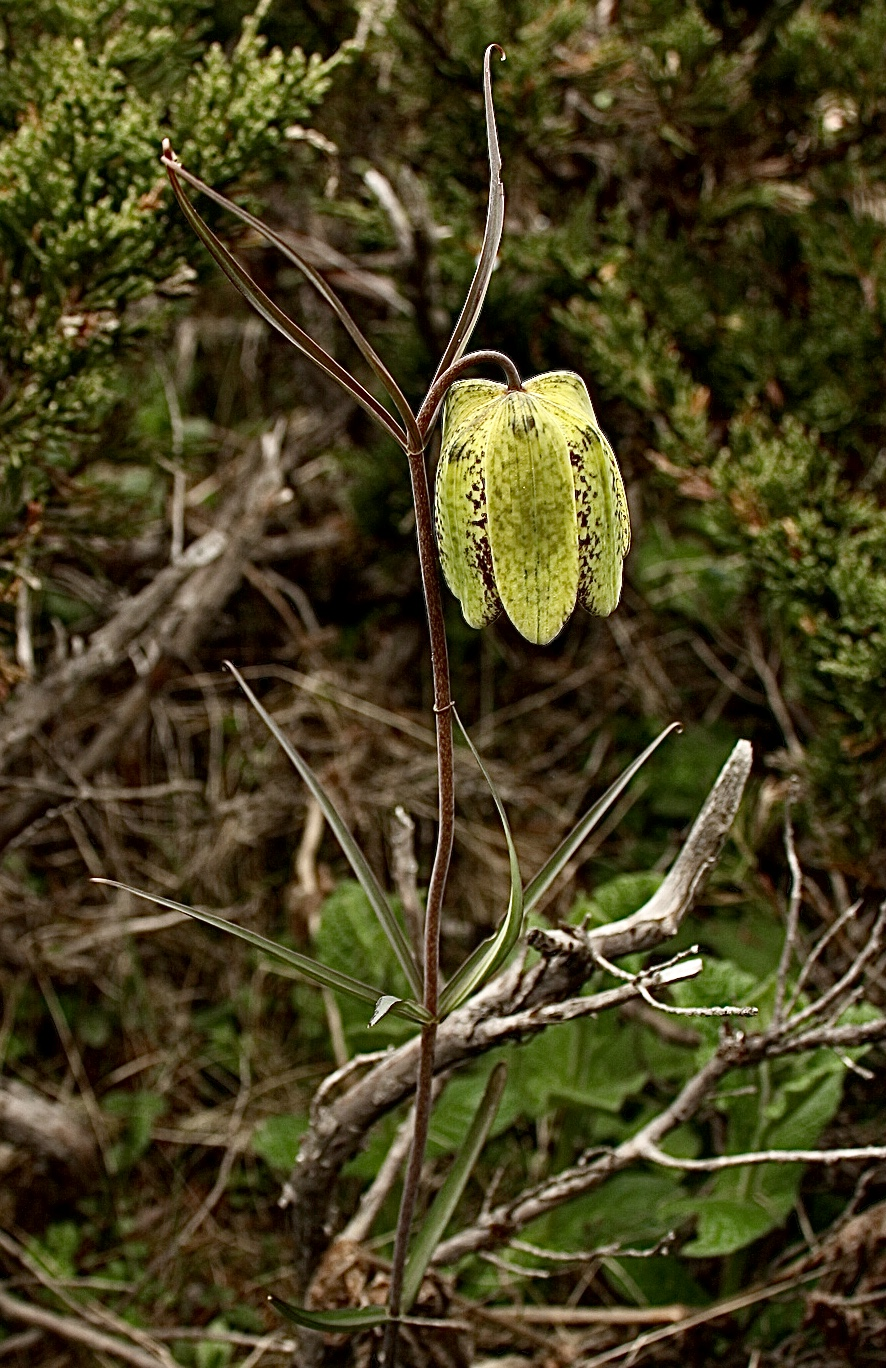
The bulbous plant Fritillaria cirrhosa which forms the source of the drug bulbus fritillariae cirrhosae

Bulbus fritillariae cirrhosae (Chinese: 川贝母; pinyin: chuānbèimǔ) is the bulb of the Himalayan frillitary lily (Fritillaria cirrhosa). It is used extensively in Chinese herbology. For example, in the Baihe Gujin Wan, it is used to "nourish yin of the lung, resolve phlegm and relieve cough".
