= Glycyrrhiza yunnanensis =

Scientific classification
- Kingdom: Plantae
- Clade: Tracheophytes
- Clade: Angiosperms
- Clade: Eudicots
- Clade: Rosids
- Order: Fabales
- Family: Fabaceae
- Subfamily: Faboideae
- Genus: Glycyrrhiza
- Species: G. yunnanensis

Binomial name
- Glycyrrhiza yunnanensis P.C.Li

Species of legume

Glycyrrhiza yunnanensis, is a plant species in the pea family, Fabaceae, native to China.
