= Glycyrrhiza aspera =

Scientific classification
- Kingdom: Plantae
- Clade: Tracheophytes
- Clade: Angiosperms
- Clade: Eudicots
- Clade: Rosids
- Order: Fabales
- Family: Fabaceae
- Subfamily: Faboideae
- Genus: Glycyrrhiza
- Species: G. aspera

Binomial name
- Glycyrrhiza aspera Pall.

Synonyms
- Glycyrrhiza asperrima L.f.; Glycyrrhiza laxiflora X.Y.Li & D.C.Feng; Glycyrrhiza laxissima Vassilcz.; Glycyrrhiza macrophylla X.Y.Li; Glycyrrhiza nutantiflora X.Y.Li; Glycyrrhiza prostrata X.Y.Li; Glycyrrhiza purpureiflora X.Y.Li; Glycyrrhiza zaissanica Serg.

Species of legume

Glycyrrhiza aspera, is a plant species in the pea family, Fabaceae, native to Asia and eastern Europe (Steppes in south-east Russia and Kazakhstan; farm sides and river banks in Gansu, Nei Mongol, Qinghai, Shaanxi and Xinjiang Provinces, China). It is used to make a tea.
