= Glycyrrhiza inflata =

Scientific classification
- Kingdom: Plantae
- Clade: Tracheophytes
- Clade: Angiosperms
- Clade: Eudicots
- Clade: Rosids
- Order: Fabales
- Family: Fabaceae
- Subfamily: Faboideae
- Genus: Glycyrrhiza
- Species: G. inflata

Binomial name
- Glycyrrhiza inflata Batalin, 1891

Synonyms
- Glycyrrhiza hediniana Harms

Species of legume

Glycyrrhiza inflata is a Chinese plant species in the genus Glycyrrhiza, A related species, G. uralensis, however, is more likely the licorice species one finds in traditional Chinese medicine.

Licochalcone A, licochalcone B and licochalcone D are chalconoids isolated from root of G. inflata as well as glycyrrhizin.
