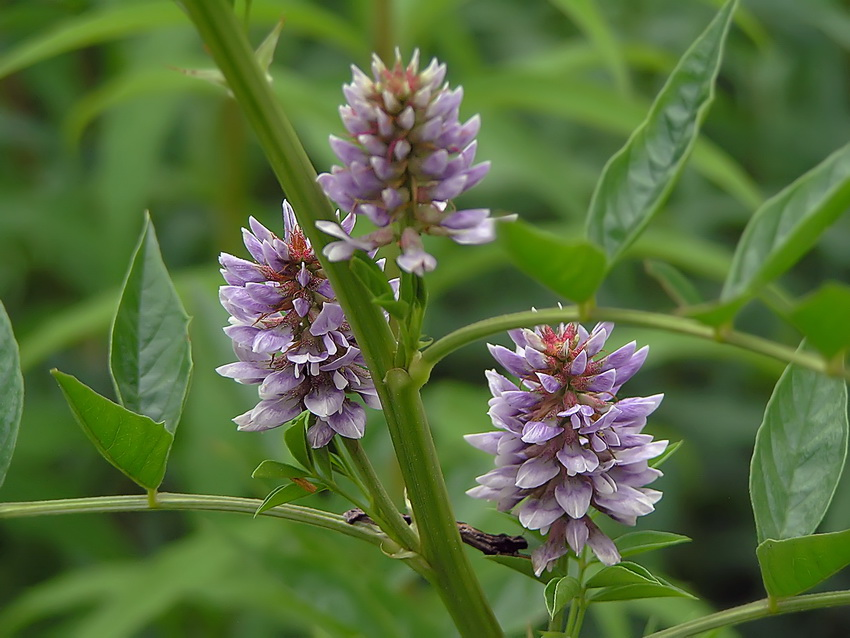

Scientific classification
- Kingdom: Plantae
- Clade: Tracheophytes
- Clade: Angiosperms
- Clade: Eudicots
- Clade: Rosids
- Order: Fabales
- Family: Fabaceae
- Subfamily: Faboideae
- Genus: Glycyrrhiza
- Species: G. pallidiflora

Binomial name
- Glycyrrhiza pallidiflora Maxim.

= Glycyrrhiza pallidiflora =

Species of plant

Glycyrrhiza pallidiflora is a species of flowering plant in the bean family, Fabaceae.

== Distribution ==
This perennial herb is native to East Asia, and found in Mongolia, Manchuria, and parts of China.

== Taxonomy ==
Described by Karl Maximovich in 1859.
