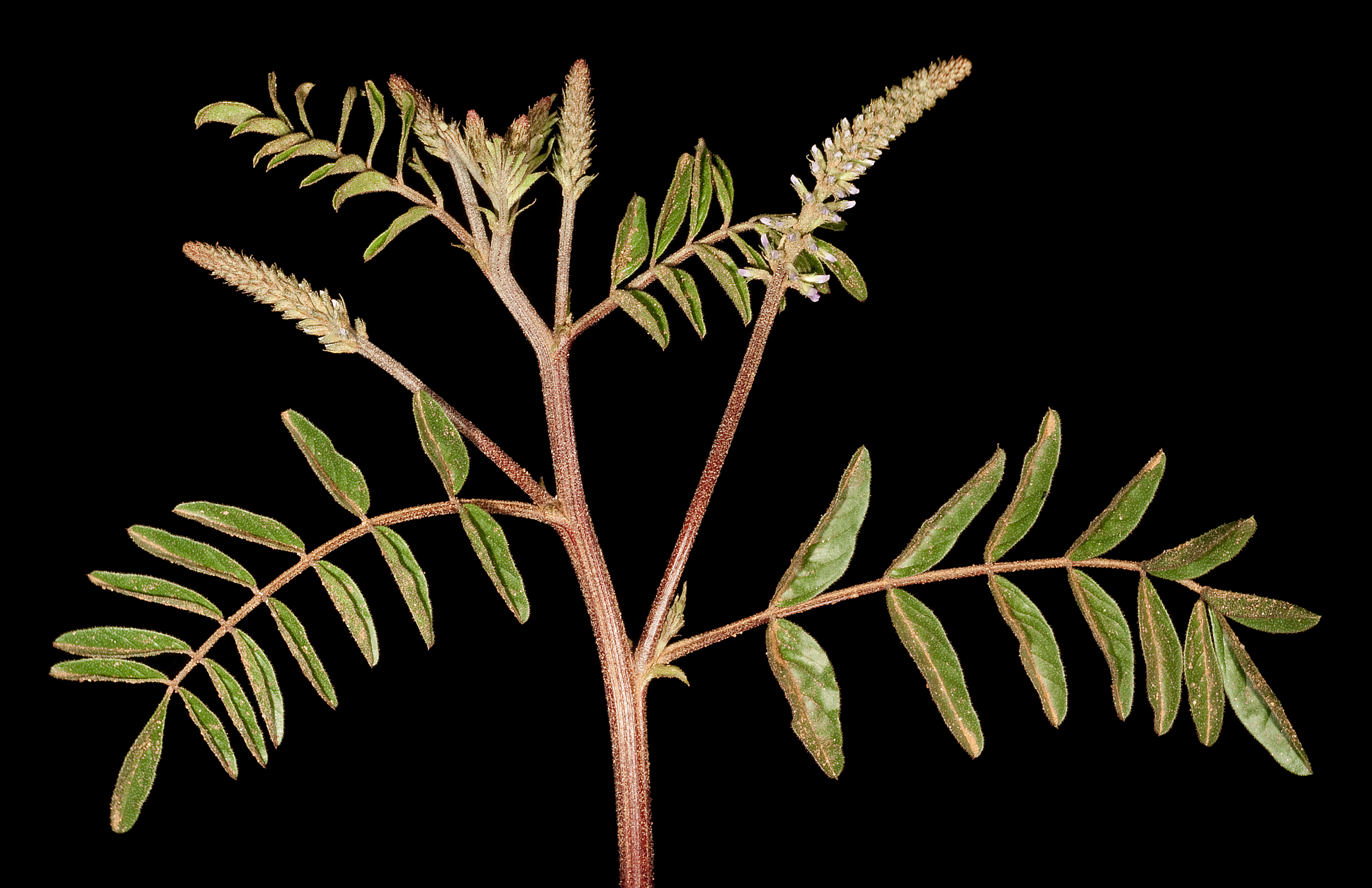

Scientific classification
- Kingdom: Plantae
- Clade: Tracheophytes
- Clade: Angiosperms
- Clade: Eudicots
- Clade: Rosids
- Order: Fabales
- Family: Fabaceae
- Subfamily: Faboideae
- Genus: Glycyrrhiza
- Species: G. acanthocarpa

Binomial name
- Glycyrrhiza acanthocarpa (Lindl.) J.M.Black

Synonyms
- Glycyrrhiza ancanthocarpa (Lindl.) J.M.Black

= Glycyrrhiza acanthocarpa =

Species of plant

Glycyrrhiza acanthocarpa, with the common names native liquorice, and southern liquorice is a subshrub in the pea family, Fabaceae. The species is native to Australia. It grows to between 0.1 and 1 metre high. Narrow purple flowers appear between September and May in the species native range.

The species was formally described in 1838 by botanist John Lindley in Three Expeditions into the interior of Eastern Australia. It was first recorded by explorer Thomas Livingstone Mitchell in 1836 near the Lachlan River in New South Wales. Lindley gave it the name Indigofera acanthocarpa. The species was later transferred to the genus Glycyrrhiza.
