= Resveratroloside =

Names
- IUPAC name 4-[(E)-2-(3,5-Dihydroxyphenyl)ethen-1-yl]phenyl β-D-glucopyranoside
- Systematic IUPAC name (2S,3R,4S,5S,6R)-2-{4-[(E)-2-(3,5-Dihydroxyphenyl)ethen-1-yl]phenoxy}-6-(hydroxymethyl)oxane-3,4,5-triol
- Other names trans-Resveratrol-4'-O-beta-D-glucopyranoside (E)-Resveratroloside; 3,5,4'-Trihydroxystilbene-4'-glucoside

Identifiers
CAS Number	38963-95-0; 50450-48-1 (non-specific)
3D model (JSmol)	Interactive image
ChemSpider	4479669
PubChem CID	5322089
UNII	7DBS6RKM2S
CompTox Dashboard (EPA)	DTXSID60415792
- InChI: InChI=1S/C20H22O8/c21-10-16-17(24)18(25)19(26)20(28-16)27-15-5-3-11(4-6-15)1-2-12-7-13(22)9-14(23)8-12/h1-9,16-26H,10H2/b2-1+/t16-,17-,18+,19-,20-/m1/s1 Key: RUOKEYJFAJITAG-CUYWLFDKSA-N; InChI=1/C20H22O8/c21-10-16-17(24)18(25)19(26)20(28-16)27-15-5-3-11(4-6-15)1-2-12-7-13(22)9-14(23)8-12/h1-9,16-26H,10H2/b2-1+/t16-,17-,18+,19-,20-/m1/s1 Key: RUOKEYJFAJITAG-CUYWLFDKBI
- SMILES: C1=CC(=CC=C1/C=C/C2=CC(=CC(=C2)O)O)O[C@H]3[C@@H]([C@H]([C@@H]([C@H](O3)CO)O)O)O

Properties
Chemical formula	C_{20}H_{22}O_{8}
Molar mass	390.388 g·mol^{−1}
- Except where otherwise noted, data are given for materials in their standard state (at 25 °C [77 °F], 100 kPa). Infobox references

Resveratroloside is a stilbenoid glucoside. It can be found in Paeonia lactiflora.
