= Glycyrrhiza squamulosa =

Scientific classification
- Kingdom: Plantae
- Clade: Tracheophytes
- Clade: Angiosperms
- Clade: Eudicots
- Clade: Rosids
- Order: Fabales
- Family: Fabaceae
- Subfamily: Faboideae
- Genus: Glycyrrhiza
- Species: G. squamulosa

Binomial name
- Glycyrrhiza squamulosa Franch.

Synonyms
- Astragalus glanduliferus Debeaux

Species of legume

Glycyrrhiza squamulosa, is a plant species in the family Fabaceae, native to China.
