= Fritillaria taipaiensis =

Scientific classification
- Kingdom: Plantae
- Clade: Tracheophytes
- Clade: Angiosperms
- Clade: Monocots
- Order: Liliales
- Family: Liliaceae
- Subfamily: Lilioideae
- Tribe: Lilieae
- Genus: Fritillaria
- Species: F. taipaiensis

Binomial name
- Fritillaria taipaiensis S.C. Chen

Synonyms
- Fritillaria cirrhosa f. glabra P.Y.Li; Fritillaria glabra (P.Y.Li) S.C.Chen; Fritillaria taipaiensis var. wanyuanensis Y.K.Yang & J.K.Wu; Fritillaria shaanxiica Y.K.Yang, S.X.Zhang & D.K.Zhang; Fritillaria shennongjiaensis Y.K.Yang & Z.Zheng; Fritillaria taipaiensis var. fengxianensis Y.K.Yang & J.K.Wu; Fritillaria taipaiensis f. platyphylla Y.K.Yang & S.X.Zhang

Species of flowering plant

Fritillaria taipaiensis is a flowering plant species in the lily family Liliaceae. It is found only in China, in the Provinces of Gansu, Hubei, Shaanxi and Sichuan.

This herbaceous perennial produces bulbs up to 20 mm in diameter. The stem is up to 100 cm tall. The flowers are nodding and pendent, yellow-green with deep purple markings.

formerly included

- Fritillaria taipaiensis var. ningxiaensis Y.K.Yang & J.K.Wu - now called Fritillaria yuzhongensis G.D.Yu & Y.S.Zhou
- Fritillaria taipaiensis var. yuxiensis Y.K.Yang, Z.Y.Gao & C.S.Zhou - now called Fritillaria yuzhongensis G.D.Yu & Y.S.Zhou
- Fritillaria taipaiensis var. zhouquensis S.C.Chen & G.D.Yu - now called Fritillaria sichuanica S.C.Chen
