= Licochalcone A =

- Chemical structure of licochalcone A

Names
- Preferred IUPAC name (2E)-3-[4-Hydroxy-2-methoxy-5-(2-methylbut-3-en-2-yl)phenyl]-1-(4-hydroxyphenyl)prop-2-en-1-one
- Other names Licochalcone a

Identifiers
CAS Number	58749-22-7
3D model (JSmol)	Interactive image
ChEBI	CHEBI:125689
ChEMBL	ChEMBL139702
ChemSpider	4477422
ECHA InfoCard	100.163.544
EC Number	635-678-2
PubChem CID	5318998
UNII	JTV5467968
CompTox Dashboard (EPA)	DTXSID10904181
- InChI: InChI=1S/C21H22O4/c1-5-21(2,3)17-12-15(20(25-4)13-19(17)24)8-11-18(23)14-6-9-16(22)10-7-14/h5-13,22,24H,1H2,2-4H3/b11-8+ Key: KAZSKMJFUPEHHW-DHZHZOJOSA-N; InChI=1/C21H22O4/c1-5-21(2,3)17-12-15(20(25-4)13-19(17)24)8-11-18(23)14-6-9-16(22)10-7-14/h5-13,22,24H,1H2,2-4H3/b11-8+ Key: KAZSKMJFUPEHHW-DHZHZOJOBU
- SMILES: CC(C)(C=C)c1cc(c(cc1O)OC)/C=C/C(=O)c2ccc(cc2)O

Properties
Chemical formula	C_{21}H_{22}O_{4}
Molar mass	338.403 g·mol^{−1}

Hazards
- GHS labelling
Pictograms	(GHS07: Exclamation mark)
Signal word	Warning
Hazard statements	H302, H312, H332
Precautionary statements	P261, P264, P280
- Safety data sheet (SDS)
- Except where otherwise noted, data are given for materials in their standard state (at 25 °C [77 °F], 100 kPa). verify (what is ?) Infobox references

Licochalcone A is a chalconoid, a type of natural phenol. It can be isolated from the root of Glycyrrhiza glabra (liquorice) or Glycyrrhiza inflata. It shows antimalarial, anticancer, antibacterial and antiviral (specifically against influenza neuraminidase) properties in vitro.
