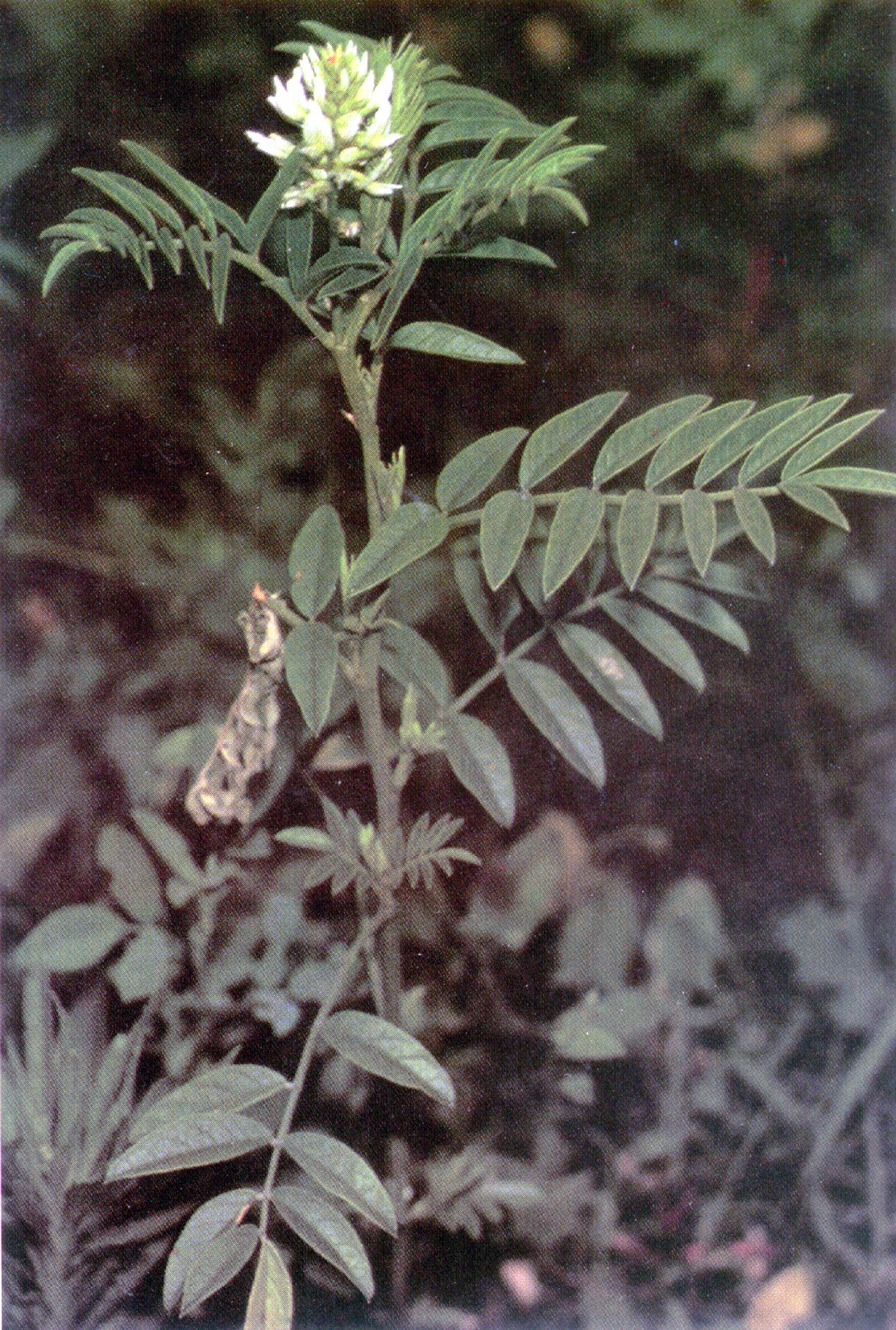

Conservation status
- Secure (NatureServe)

Scientific classification
- Kingdom: Plantae
- Clade: Tracheophytes
- Clade: Angiosperms
- Clade: Eudicots
- Clade: Rosids
- Order: Fabales
- Family: Fabaceae
- Subfamily: Faboideae
- Genus: Glycyrrhiza
- Species: G. lepidota

Binomial name
- Glycyrrhiza lepidota Pursh

Synonyms
- List: Glycyrrhiza glutinosa Nutt. (1838); Glycyrrhiza lepidota var. glutinosa (Nutt.) S.Watson (1876); Liquiritia lepidota Nutt. (1813)

= Glycyrrhiza lepidota =

American licorice

Species of flowering plant in the pea family

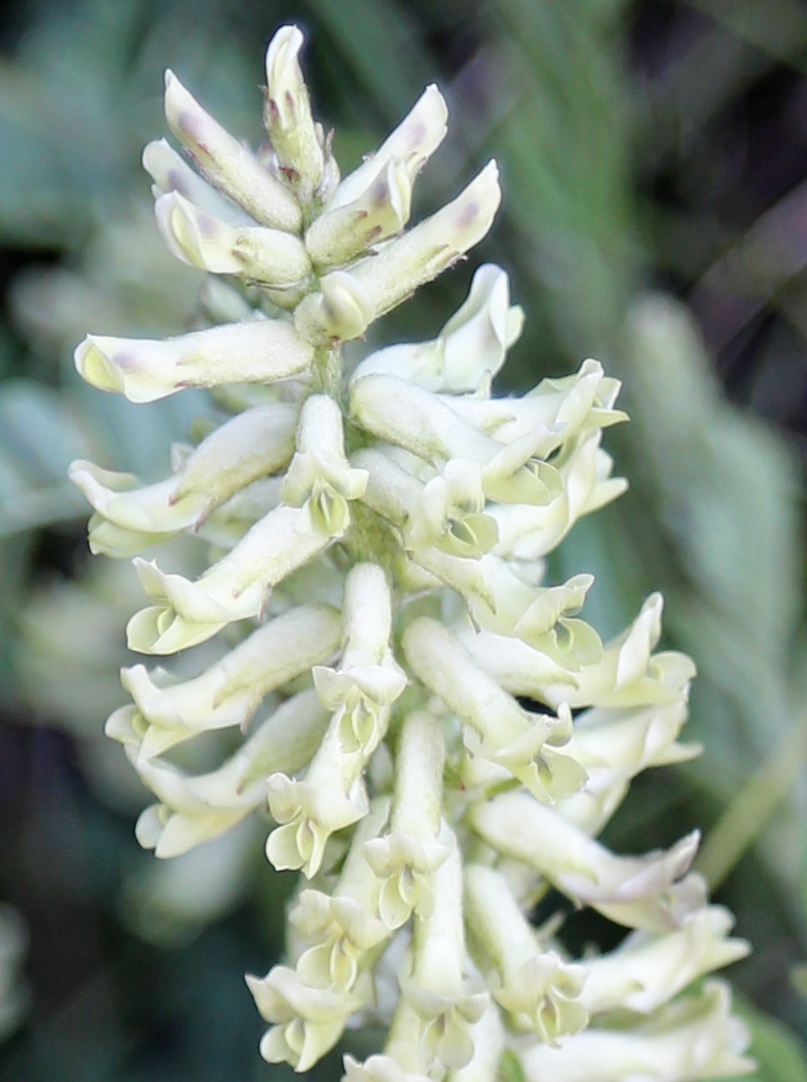
Wild licorice flowerhead, at 8,400 ft (2,600 m) in the Eastern Sierra Nevada

Glycyrrhiza lepidota (American licorice) is a species of Glycyrrhiza (a genus in the pea/bean family, Fabaceae) native to most of North America, from central Canada south through the United States to California, Texas and Virginia, but absent from the southeastern states. It is also sometimes known in the United States as "wild licorice", to distinguish it from the related European licorice (Glycyrrhiza glabra) which is occasionally cultivated.

The plant grows in moist soils; although it will grow in heavy soil it prefers sandy soil. It grows to 40–100 cm (16–39 in) tall, and has long tough brown roots which are said to be sweet and were used as food and for medicinal purposes by Native Americans. After eating a roasted root in 1806, Meriwether Lewis described an "agreeable flavor not unlike the sweet pittaitoe (sweet potato)."

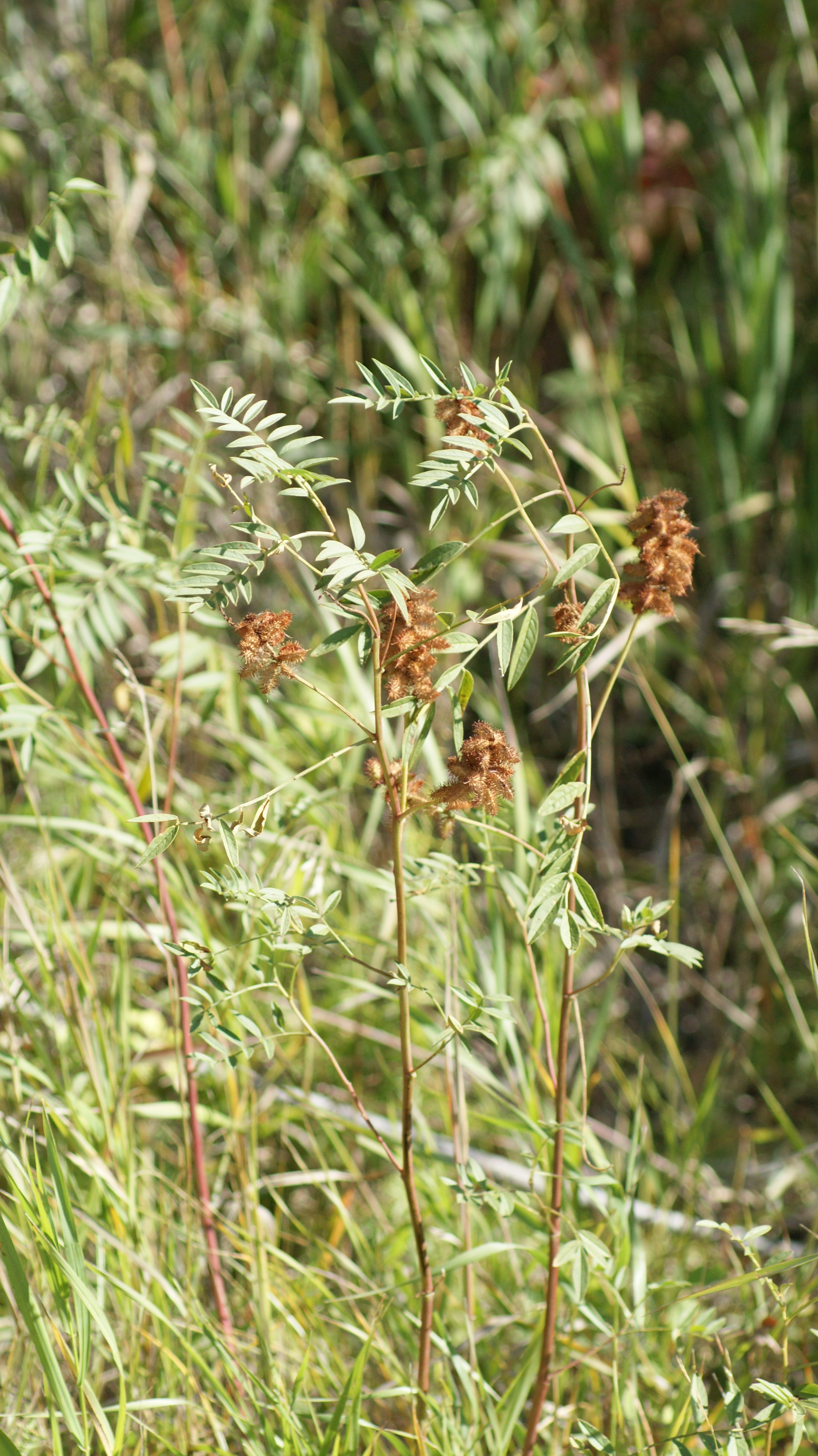
Burr (seeds) of the wild licorice growing along the South Saskatchewan River bank near Saskatoon, SK

American licorice is not sweet from sugar but from glycyrrhizin. Glycyrrhizin may increase blood pressure (aka hypertension) by interfering with cortisol conversion. The Zuni people chew the root to keep the mouth sweet and moist.

American licorice is grazed by cattle, but not preferred and will increase under grazing as competing plants are grazed off. The new growth can be toxic. It has light green to white flowers in the spring which ripen in the fall to clusters of burs which contain pods of small bean-like seeds.

It can be used as a pioneer species to revegetate bare or disturbed ground and is often the first species to invade a receding alkali flat.

There is a market for American licorice root both for medicinal uses and flavoring; also the sweetening of tobacco products.
