= Fritillaria yuzhongensis =

Scientific classification
- Kingdom: Plantae
- Clade: Tracheophytes
- Clade: Angiosperms
- Clade: Monocots
- Order: Liliales
- Family: Liliaceae
- Subfamily: Lilioideae
- Tribe: Lilieae
- Genus: Fritillaria
- Species: F. yuzhongensis

Binomial name
- Fritillaria yuzhongensis G.D.Yu & Y.S.Zhou

Synonyms
- Synonymy: Fritillaria cirrhosa var. brevistigma Y.K.Yang & J.K.Wu; Fritillaria glabra var. shanxiensis S.C.Chen; Fritillaria lanzhouensis Y.K.Yang, P.P.Ling & G.Yao; Fritillaria lishiensis Y.K.Yang & J.K.Wu; Fritillaria lishiensis var. yichengensis Y.K.Yang & P.P.Ling; Fritillaria taipaiensis var. ningxiaensis Y.K.Yang & J.K.Wu; Fritillaria taipaiensis var. yuxiensis Y.K.Yang, Z.Y.Gao & C.S.Zhou

Species of flowering plant

Fritillaria yuzhongensis is a plant species native to China (Gansu, Henan, Ningxia, Shaanxi, Shanxi). It grows on open grassy hillsides at elevations of 1,800–3,500 m (5,900–11,500 ft).

This is a bulb-producing perennial up to 50 cm (20 in) tall. The leaves are opposite, narrowly lanceolate, up to 10 cm (3.9 in) long. The flowers are nodding, pendent, bell-shaped, yellowish-green with purple markings.
