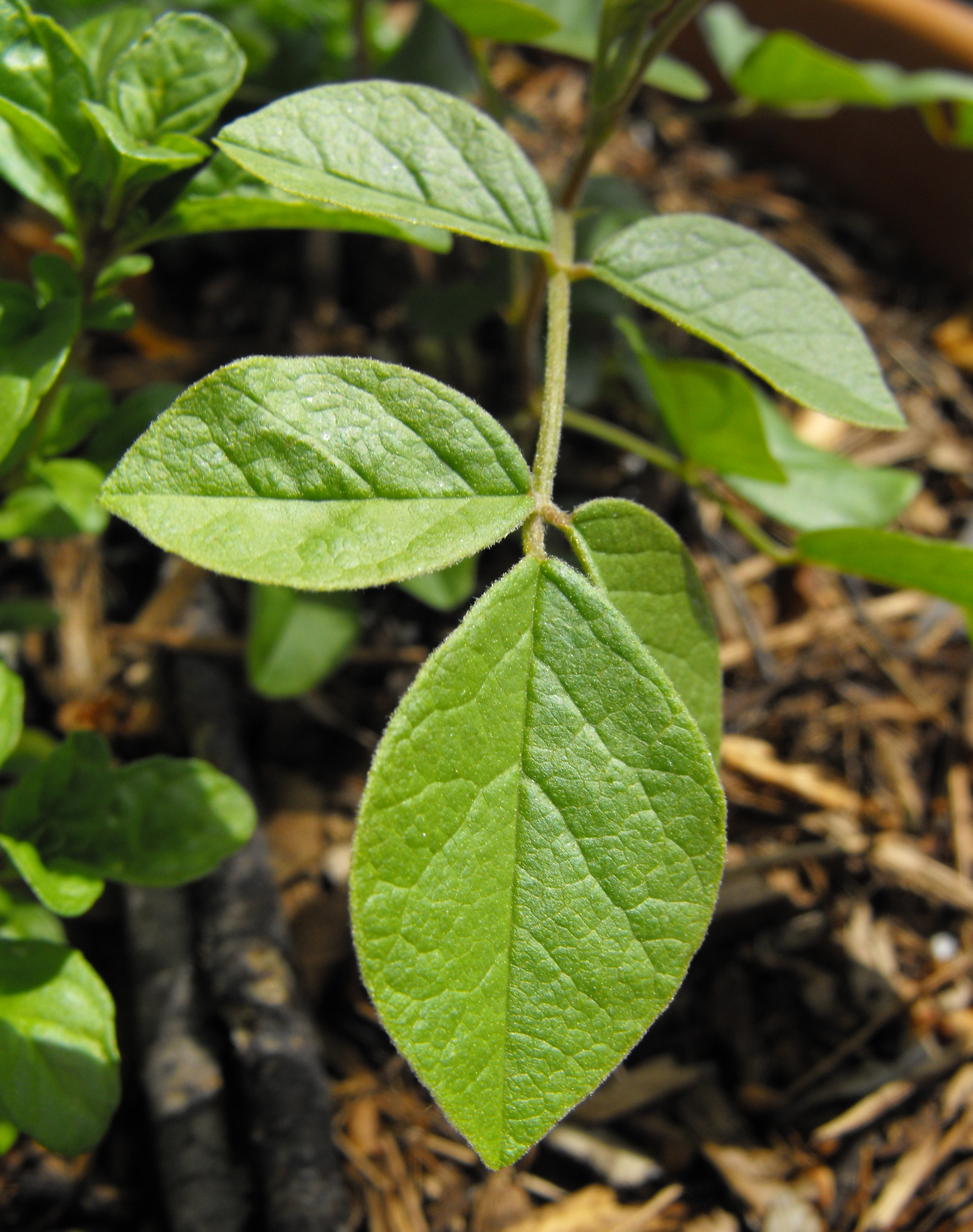

Scientific classification
- Kingdom: Plantae
- Clade: Tracheophytes
- Clade: Angiosperms
- Clade: Eudicots
- Clade: Rosids
- Order: Fabales
- Family: Fabaceae
- Subfamily: Faboideae
- Genus: Glycyrrhiza
- Species: G. uralensis

Binomial name
- Glycyrrhiza uralensis Fisch. ex DC.

Synonyms
- Glycyrrhiza glandulifera Ledeb.

= Glycyrrhiza uralensis =

Species of legume

Glycyrrhiza uralensis, also known as Chinese liquorice, is a flowering plant native to Asia. It is used as a sweetener and in traditional Chinese medicine.

== Traditional uses ==
Liquorice root, or 'radix glycyrrhizae', is one of the 50 fundamental herbs used in traditional Chinese medicine, where it has the name gancao (kan-tsao; Chinese: 甘草, pinyin: gāncǎo). It is used in Chinese medicine to harmonize other herbs and to reduce the harsh effects of other herbs. It is usually collected in spring and autumn, when it is sliced and sun-dried, then either used unprepared or stir-baked with honey. Liquorice root is most commonly produced in the Shanxi, Gansu and Xinjiang regions of China.

=== Side effects ===
Liquorice root contains glycyrrhizin, which may affect blood pressure, blood potassium levels or have untoward effects during pregnancy. Overuse of licorice may induce weakness, headache, blurred vision, nosebleed, anxiety, or shortness of breath. Other common side effects may include missed menstrual periods, fluid retention or sexual problems in men. More serious instances of overuse can lead to hypertension and hyperaldosteronism, which may require hospitalization.

== Plant description ==
=== Harvesting and growth ===
Glycyrrhiza uralensis can be found growing naturally in Europe, Asia, and throughout the Middle East. This Chinese licorice is harvested mainly during the spring and autumn and is dried by sunlight. The plant is very strong rooted, and grows to be 30-120 cm tall.

=== Chemistry ===
The plant contains a glycoside that is 30-50 times sweeter than sucrose, glycyrrhizin, which has the chemical composition C_{42}H_{62}O_{16}. The plant contains numerous phytochemicals.

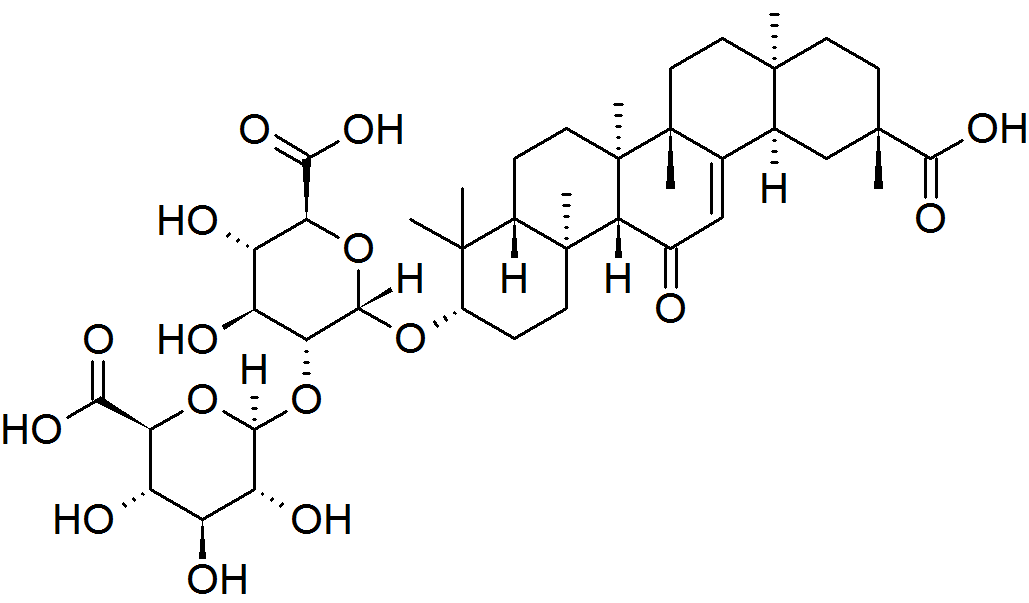
The chemical structure of glycyrrhizin.

== See also ==
- Chinese herbology § 50 fundamental herbs
- Liquorice
