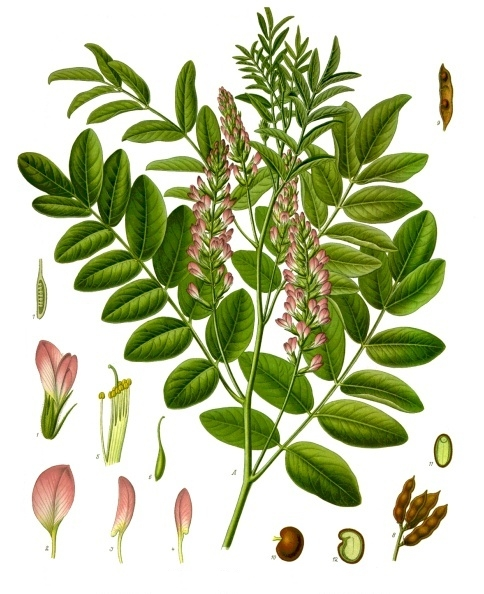
- Glycyrrhiza glabra

Scientific classification
- Kingdom: Plantae
- Clade: Tracheophytes
- Clade: Angiosperms
- Clade: Eudicots
- Clade: Rosids
- Order: Fabales
- Family: Fabaceae
- Subfamily: Faboideae
- Clade: Inverted repeat-lacking clade
- Genus: Glycyrrhiza; L.

Synonyms
- Clidanthera R.Br. (1849); Liquiritia Medik. (1787); Meristotropis Fisch. & C.A.Mey. (1843)

= Glycyrrhiza =

Genus of plants

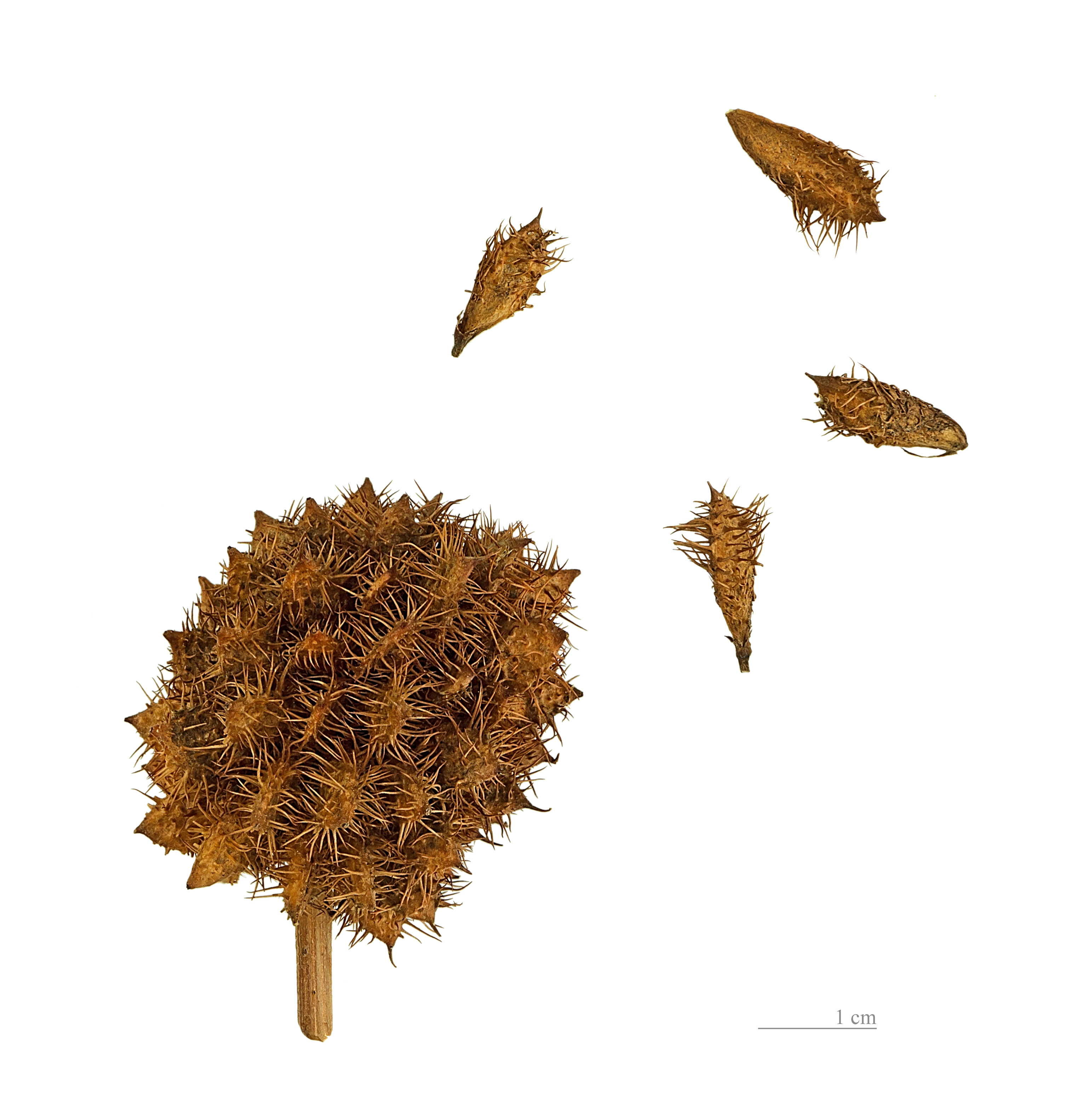
Glycyrrhiza echinata Fruits and Seeds - MHNT

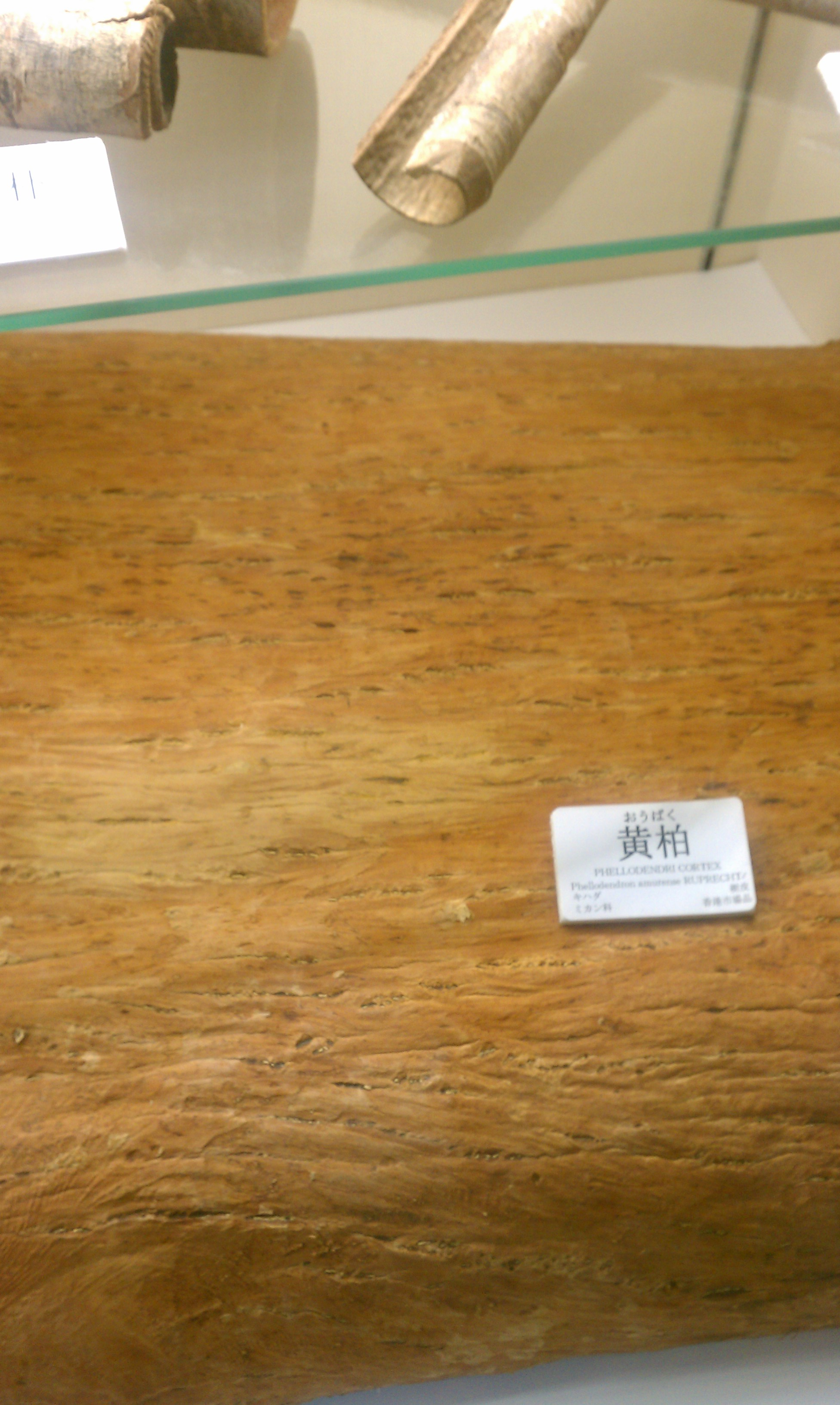
Plant as used in Chinese herbology (crude medicine)

Glycyrrhiza is a genus of about 20 accepted species in the legume family (Fabaceae), with a subcosmopolitan distribution in Asia, Australia, Europe, and the Americas.

The genus is well-known for liquorice (British English; licorice in American English), G. glabra, a species native to Eurasia and North Africa, from which most confectionery liquorice is produced.

== Species ==
17 species are accepted:

- Glycyrrhiza acanthocarpa (Lindl.) J.M.Black
- Glycyrrhiza aspera Pall.
- Glycyrrhiza astragalina Gillies ex Hook. & Arn.
- Glycyrrhiza asymmetrica Hub.-Mor.
- Glycyrrhiza bucharica Regel
- Glycyrrhiza echinata L.
- Glycyrrhiza foetida Desf.
- Glycyrrhiza glabra L. – liquorice, licorice
- Glycyrrhiza gontscharovii Maslenn.
- Glycyrrhiza inflata Batalin
- Glycyrrhiza lepidota Pursh – American licorice
- Glycyrrhiza pallidiflora Maxim.
- Glycyrrhiza squamulosa Franch.
- Glycyrrhiza triphylla Fisch. & C.A.Mey.
- Glycyrrhiza uralensis Fisch. ex DC. – Chinese licorice, Chinese liquorice
- Glycyrrhiza yunnanensis S.H.Cheng & L.K.Tai ex P.C.Li
- Glycyrrhiza zaissanica Serg.
