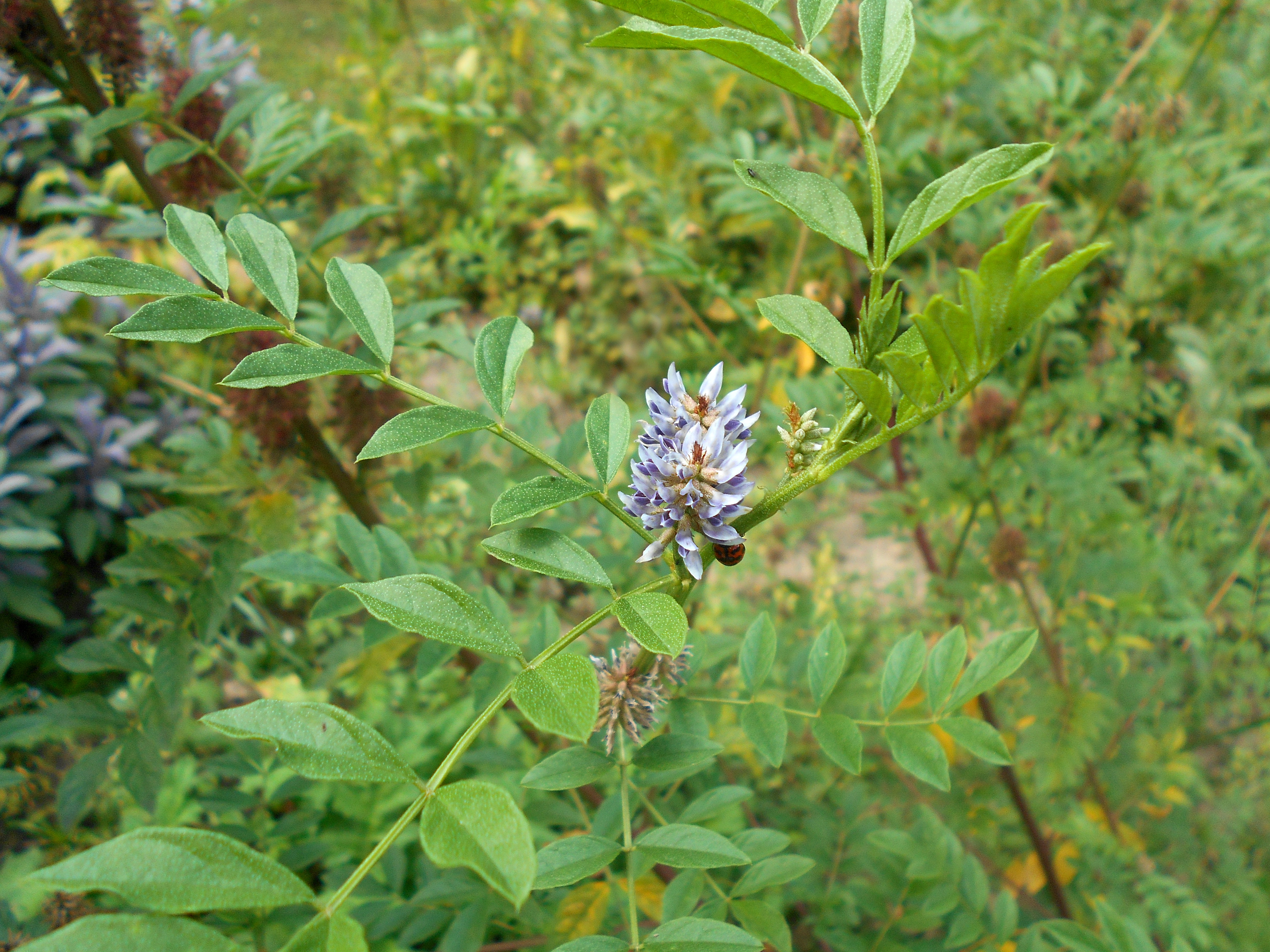

Scientific classification
- Kingdom: Plantae
- Clade: Tracheophytes
- Clade: Angiosperms
- Clade: Eudicots
- Clade: Rosids
- Order: Fabales
- Family: Fabaceae
- Subfamily: Faboideae
- Genus: Glycyrrhiza
- Species: G. echinata

Binomial name
- Glycyrrhiza echinata L.

Synonyms
- Glycyrrhiza inermis Boros; Glycyrrhiza macedonica Boiss. & Orph.

= Glycyrrhiza echinata =

Species of legume

Glycyrrhiza echinata is a species of flowering plant in the genus Glycyrrhiza, with various common names that include Chinese licorice, German licorice, and hedgehog licorice, Eastern European licorice, Hungarian licorice, Prickly licorice, and Roman licorice.

== Taxonomy ==
Glycyrrhiza echinata was one of the species described by Carl Linnaeus in his 1753 work Species Plantarum, the starting point for botanical nomenclature. The Latin specific epithet of echinata refers to hedgehog, from echinus, meaning 'prickly'.

== Distribution ==
Glycyrrhiza echinata is native to Southeastern Europe, adjacent parts of West Asia and East Asia.

== Uses ==
It is used as a flavoring and medicinally, and to produce Russian and German licorice.
