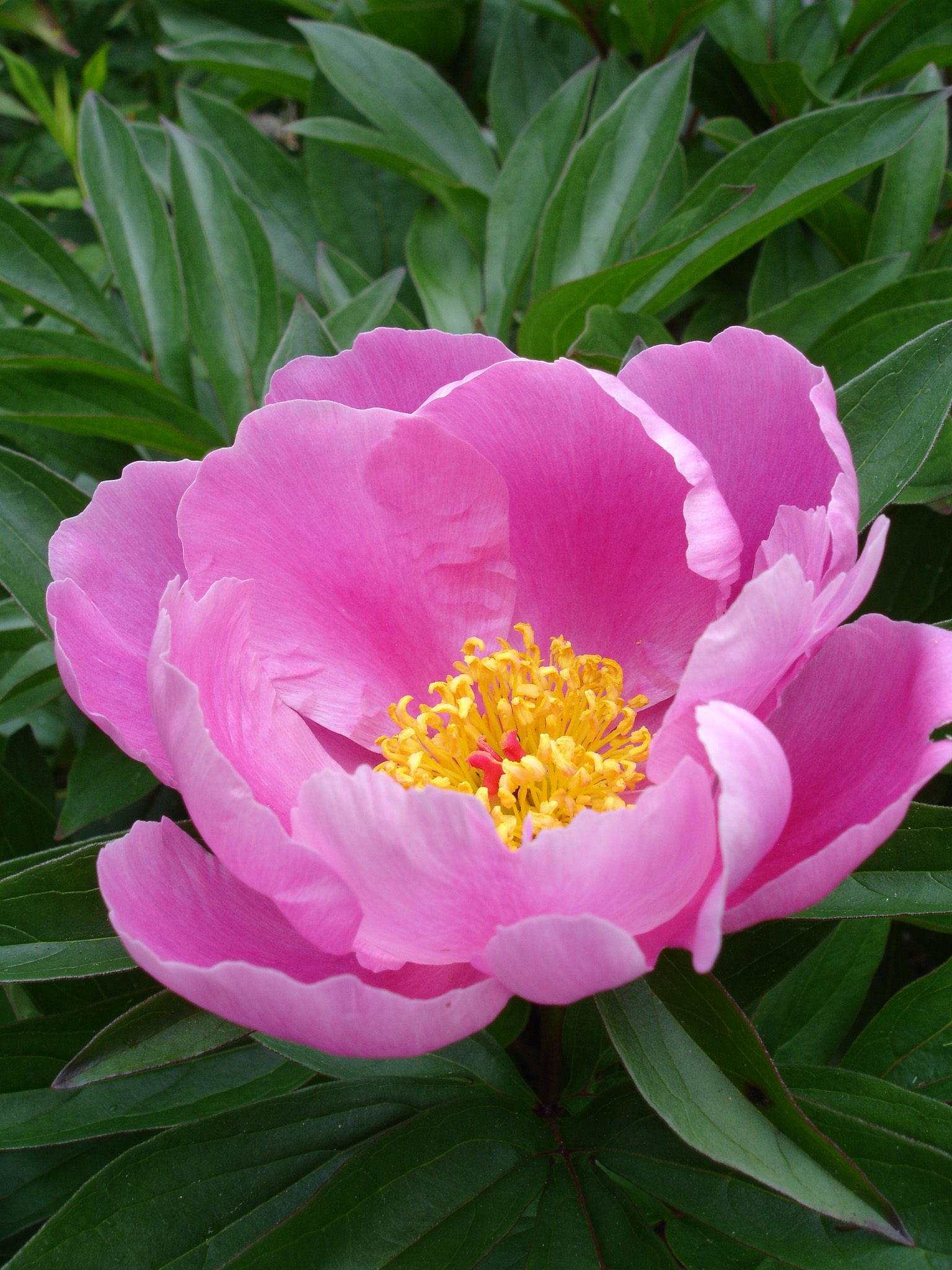
- Paeonia lactiflora

Scientific classification
- Kingdom: Plantae
- Clade: Tracheophytes
- Clade: Angiosperms
- Clade: Eudicots
- Order: Saxifragales
- Family: Paeoniaceae
- Genus: Paeonia
- Species: P. lactiflora

Binomial name
- Paeonia lactiflora Pall.

Synonyms
- Paeonia edulis Salisb. Paeonia albiflora Pall.

= Paeonia lactiflora =

Species of flowering plant

Paeonia lactiflora (Chinese peony, Chinese herbaceous peony, or common garden peony) is a species of herbaceous perennial flowering plant in the family Paeoniaceae, native to central and eastern Asia from eastern Tibet across northern China to eastern Siberia.

== Description ==
It is 50–70 cm (20–28 in) tall and broad, with 9-lobed leaves 20–40 cm (8–16 in) long.

The flower buds appear in late spring (May in the Northern Hemisphere). They are large and round, opening into fragrant, cup- or bowl-shaped flowers 8–16 cm (3–6 in) in diameter, with 5–10 white, pink, or crimson petals and yellow stamens. The plant attracts butterflies. Its habitats include dry open stony slopes, riverbanks and sparse woodland edges.

== Background ==
Paeonia lactiflora was known as the white peony (P. albiflora) when first introduced into Europe. It was brought to England in the mid-18th century, and is the parent of most modern varieties. It has been grown as an ornamental in China since the 7th century.

The Latin specific epithet lactiflora means "with milk white flowers".

In China, P. lactiflora is likened to "the Minister of Flowers" (花相), while Paeonia × suffruticosa is known as "the King of Flowers" (花王).. They were commonly given at farewells, as a promise to reunite.

== Cultivars ==
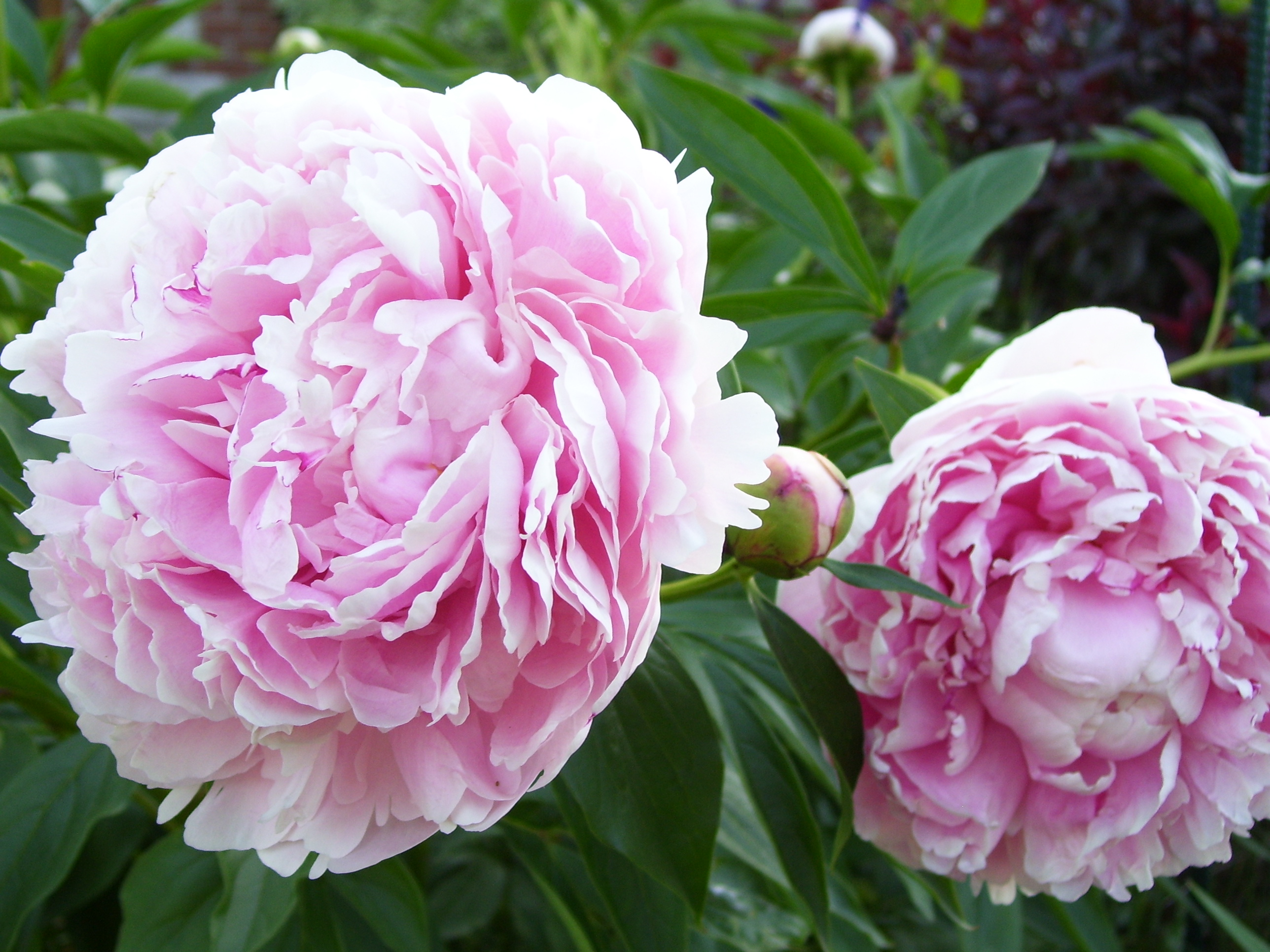
cv. 'Sarah Bernhardt'

There are several hundred selected cultivars in a range of colours, sizes, and forms. Many have double flowers, with the stamens modified into additional petals. There are several colors, including white, pink, rose, and near red, with single to fully double forms. They are prolific bloomers, and have become the main source of peonies for the cut flower business.

The following cultivars have gained the Royal Horticultural Society's Award of Garden Merit:

- 'Bowl of Beauty' (double, pink and cream)
- 'Coral Charm' (salmon pink)
- 'Duchesse de Nemours' (double white)
- 'Felix Crousse' (double deep pink)
- 'Festiva maxima' (double white)
- 'Laura Dessert' (double white)
- 'Miss America'
- 'Monsieur Jules Elie' (double pink)
- 'Sarah Bernhardt' (double pink)
- 'Whitleyi Major' (single white, prominent stamens)

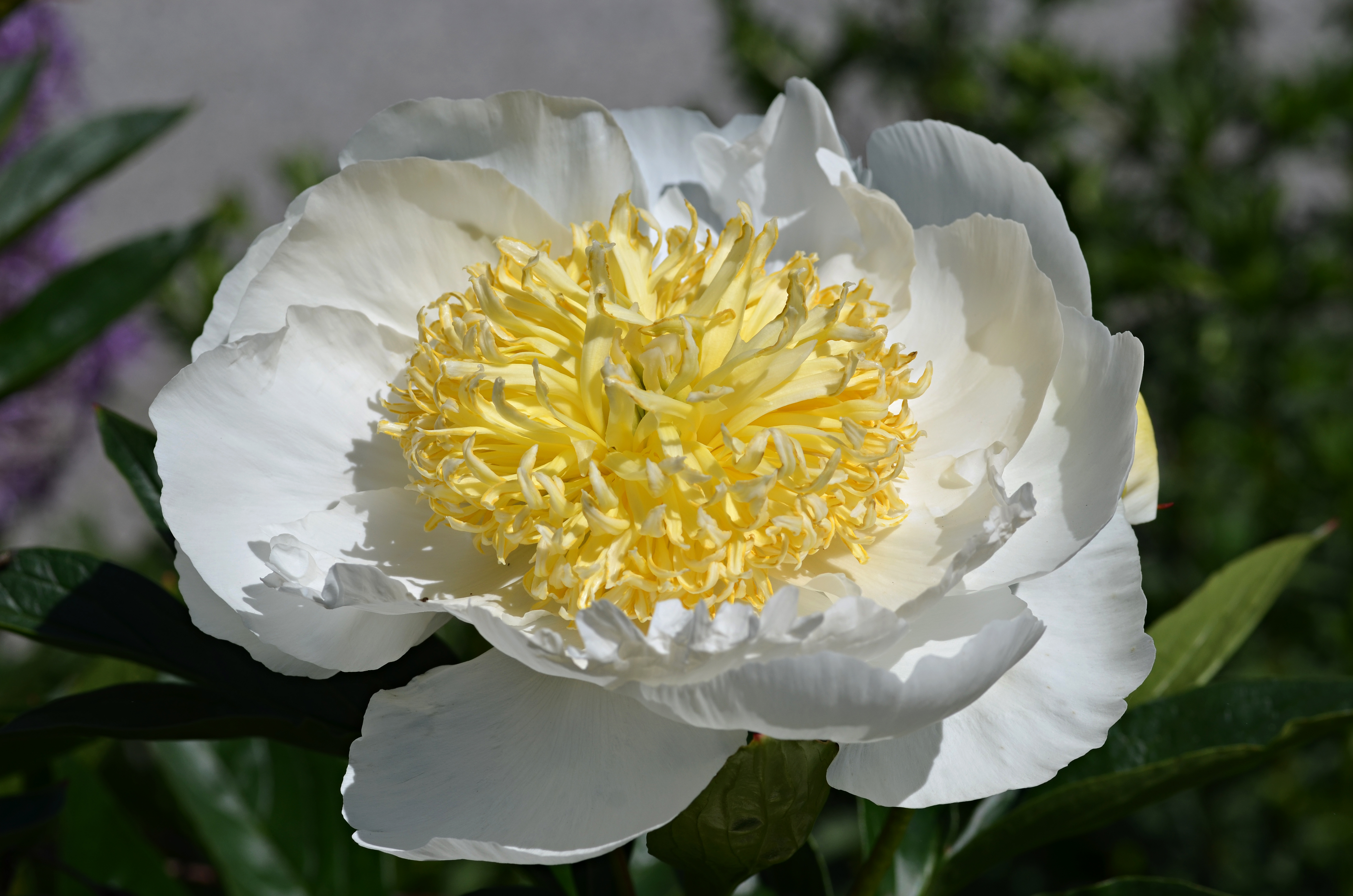
'Gold Rush'

== Chemistry ==
The leaves of many cultivars are high in oleanolic and ursolic acid.

=== Phenolic compounds ===
Cis-epsilon-viniferin, trans-resveratrol, trans-resveratrol-4'-O-beta-D-glucopyranoside, trans-epsilon-viniferin, gnetin H, and suffruticosol A, B and paeoniflorin esters can be found in P. lactiflora.

Petals color is dependent on a UDP-glucose: Flavonoid 5-O-glucosyltransferase expressing anthocyanins such as peonidin-3,5-di-O-glucoside, pelargonidin-3,5-di-O-glucoside, cyanidin-3,5-di-O-glucoside, peonidin-3-O-glucoside, cyanidin-3-O-glucoside, peonidin-3-O-glucoside-5-O-arabinoside, cyanidin-3-O-glucoside-5-O-galactoside and pelargonidin-3-O-glucoside-5-O-galactoside.

== In art and culture ==
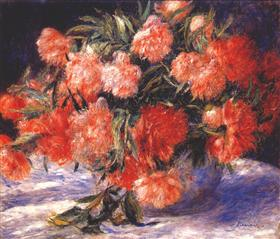
Peonies 1880 – Pierre-Auguste Renoir

Paeonia lactiflora became a popular still life subject for Impressionist artists in the late 19th century.

- Pierre-Auguste Renoir featured Peonies in multiple paintings from the 1870s through the 1890s. The Independent wrote of his fondness for the flower that: "They had been introduced into the horticultural world of Paris in the 1860s, so there was still something of the exotic about them, and Renoir paints them rather solemnly and majestically."
- Vincent van Gogh painted "Vase with Peonies", "Bowl with Peonies and Roses" and "Vase with cornflowers and poppies, peonies and chrysanthemums", all in 1886.
- Claude Monet painted "Vase of Peonies" in 1882.
- Édouard Manet cultivated peonies in his garden and painted them frequently. The Impressionist artist Frédéric Bazille painted "Young Woman with Peonies" in 1870 as a tribute to his friend Manet, knowing his fondness for the flower.
