= Acrylic painting techniques =

Techniques used in acrylic painting

Acrylic painting techniques are different styles of manipulating and working with polymer-based acrylic paints. Acrylics differ from oil paints in that they have shorter drying times (as little as 10 minutes) and are soluble in water. Since acrylic paint dries at a faster rate than other types of paint, some techniques require more swift execution before the paint dries. There are benefits to adding water before it dries out completely, because the paint can be manipulated for longer before drying. Acrylic paint eliminates the need for turpentine and gesso, and can be applied directly onto the canvas, though gesso can still be used to improve the look of a painting and provide a smoother surface to work with. Artists use various paint brushes and a multi color palette to help them find and refine painting techniques. Aside from painting with concentrated color paints, acrylics can also be watered down to a consistency that can be poured or used for glazes.

== Preventing paint from drying out ==
Acrylics are often preferred because they dry faster on canvas than oil paints due to their polymer base. However, in some circumstances, the artist may want the paint to stay moist longer. A trick to keep paints from drying out is to spray a light mist of water over them occasionally. Another way is by adding an artistic grade acrylic retarder or a homemade retarder. Moisture-retaining palettes also increase acrylic paint drying time, and can be substituted with a shallow container, a sheet of grease proof paper, or piece of wet watercolor paper.

== Creating fluid paints ==
Fluid paint, in general, is a moveable form of acrylic paint. Fluid paints can be used like watercolors, for acrylic pouring, or for glazing and washes. To create a more fluid consistency, water or a pouring medium is added to the paint. The ratio of paint to water/pouring medium depends on how thick the glaze or pouring paint is expected to be.

An opaque glaze or paint consists of more paint than water, and will give a more solid color. A translucent glaze or paint will be the opposite, consisting of slightly more water than the opaque version, and will have a smoother texture. Translucent glazes show more of the colors underneath the paint compared to opaque glazes.

When it comes to acrylic pouring, the consistency of the paint mix will largely depend on the technique that it will be used for. Techniques like the Dutch pour or Pearl pour require much thinner paint mixes than other techniques such as the Bloom pour or Ring pour.

Artist Keri Ippolito advises that the paint should be watered no more than 50 percent or the paint will not stick to the canvas. Adding too much water to acrylic paints will break the bonds between pigments.

After mixing the paints, allow time for the air bubbles to rise to the surface. This will be crucial in many techniques, especially in acrylic pouring.

There are many different techniques one can use when creating an acrylic pour painting, however, the flip cup pouring technique discussed below is a good one for beginners and experienced painters. To start, elevate the canvas to where it's flat and easy to pick up and move around. Place four cups underneath each corner of the canvas. Once the canvas is set up, grab a cup, and choose as many or as few colors as desired. Start by filling the cup up with about one inch of a base color, such as white. Once the base color is at the bottom of the cup, then begin layering the other chosen colors. Once you are satisfied with the colorful cup of paint, swiftly overturn the cup onto the top of the canvas, without releasing any paint from the cup. Then, when ready, lift the cup and release the paint. Once the cup is empty and there is a puddle of paint on the canvas, carefully lift the canvas and move it around so the paint covers the whole surface and until you reach the desired look. Warning, this pouring technique is extremely messy so make sure you are in a well-covered area.

== Painting glazes ==
Acrylic paint glazes are often used to create more depth in an image. When glaze medium is applied to acrylic paint, the paint becomes more transparent and will reveal the layer of paint used beneath it, which modifies the color. This technique is commonly used to create more realistic images. Light colored glazes also have softening effects when painted over dark or bright images. Artists can mix glazes themselves, or can buy pre-mixed acrylic glazes.

It is best to wait for each layer to dry thoroughly before applying another coat. This will prevent the paint from smearing or leaving unwanted smudge marks. After the application of several layers, rubbing alcohol can be brushed or sprayed on to reveal colors from earlier layers.

== Pouring paints ==
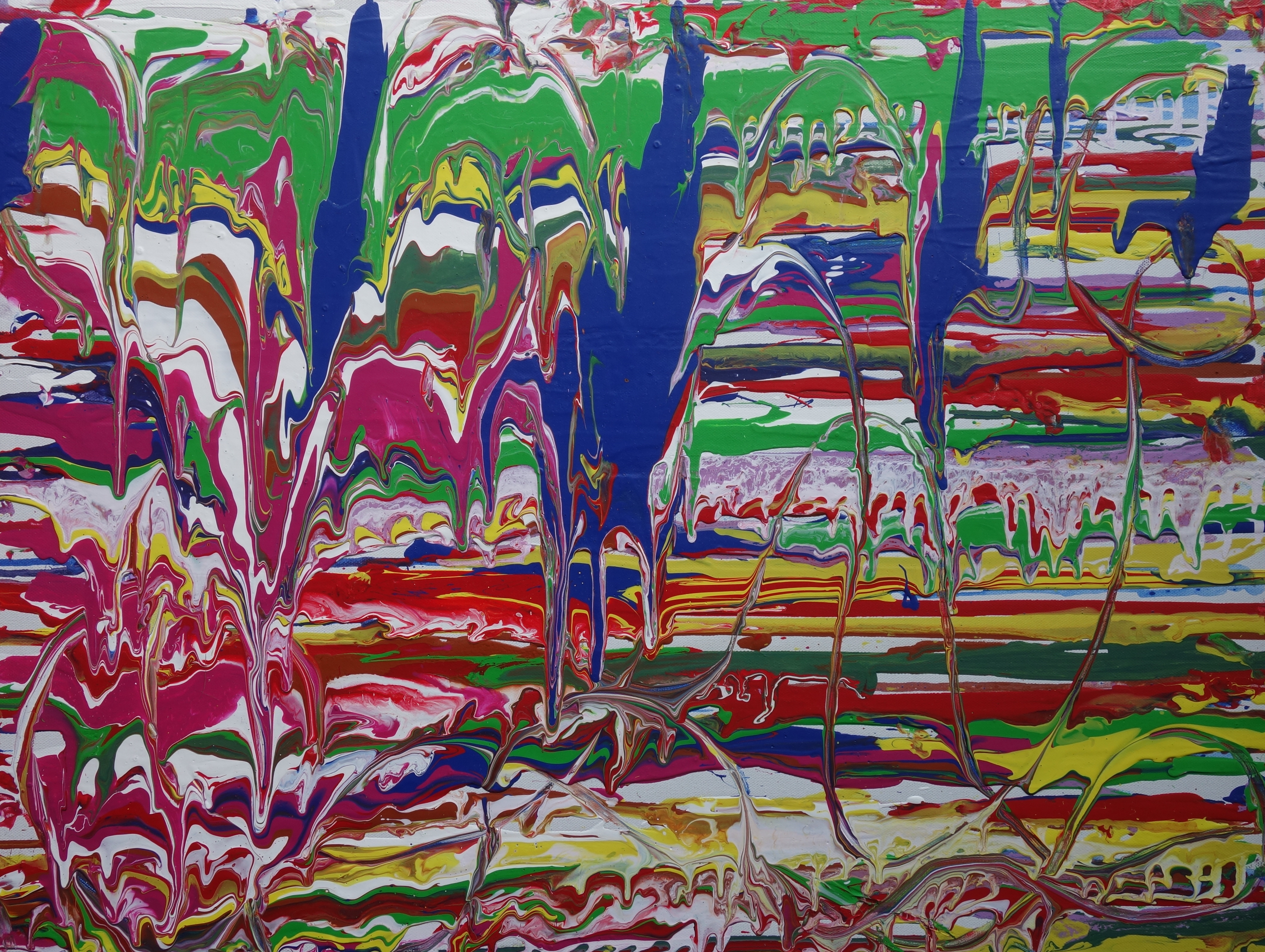
This painting was made by combining poured acrylic paint with impasto painting.

Pour painting is an innovative way to use acrylic paints to create an art piece. Instead of using tools like brushes or knives to create a piece of art, fluid paints can be poured directly onto the surface and the canvas tilted to move the paint around.

A simple definition is: Acrylic Paint Pouring is the method of making acrylic paint flow in a variety of ways to create pleasing patterns that are usually abstract in nature. Pouring paints allows for the colors to blend naturally as they come in contact with each other. This technique can be done either one color at a time, or with multiple paints to maximize color blending.

Pour painting can also be done with oil paints, but because those paints take a longer time to dry, the piece would have to be done over an extended period of time, or with wet paints. However, the subtle effects of the interaction of different liquid colors on drying can be partially lost during the drying process.
