= C7H7ClO =

The molecular formula C_{7}H_{7}ClO (molar mass: 142.58 g/mol, exact mass: 142.0185 u) may refer to:

- 2-Chloro-m-cresol
- p-Chlorocresol
