= Chlorocresol =

Chlorocresol may refer to a number of different chemical compounds, of which two are of primary importance:

- 2-Chloro-m-cresol
- p-Chlorocresol
