= PCMC =

PCMC may refer to:

- 4-Chloro-3-methylphenol, a disinfectant
- PCMC Bhavan metro station
- PCMC Hockey Stadium
- Philippine Collective Media Corporation, Philippine media company
- Pimpri-Chinchwad Municipal Corporation, the municipal corporation of the Indian city of Pimpri-Chinchwad
