= Acrylic paint =

Water-resistant paint type meant for canvases

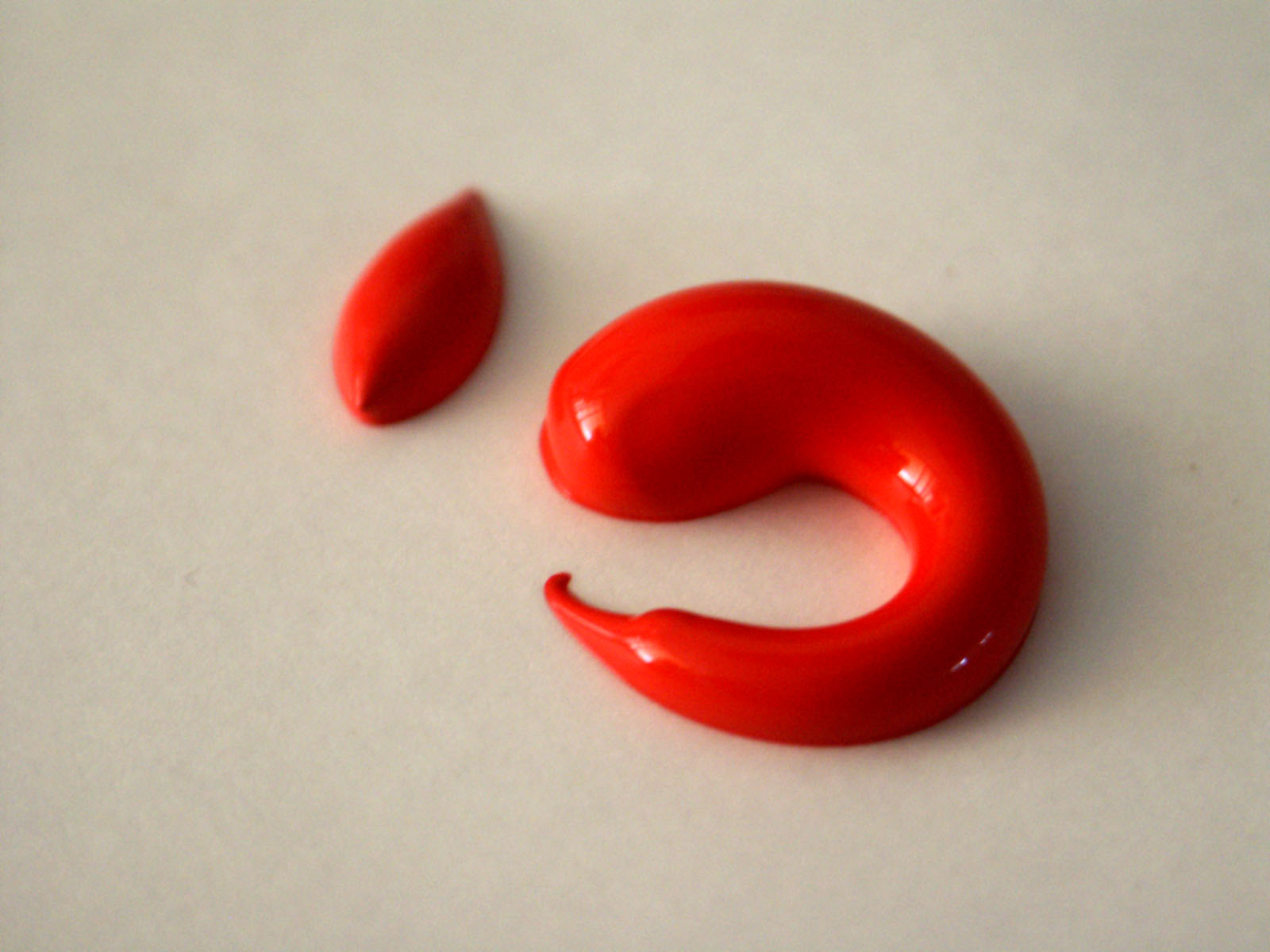
Red acrylic paint squeezed from a tube

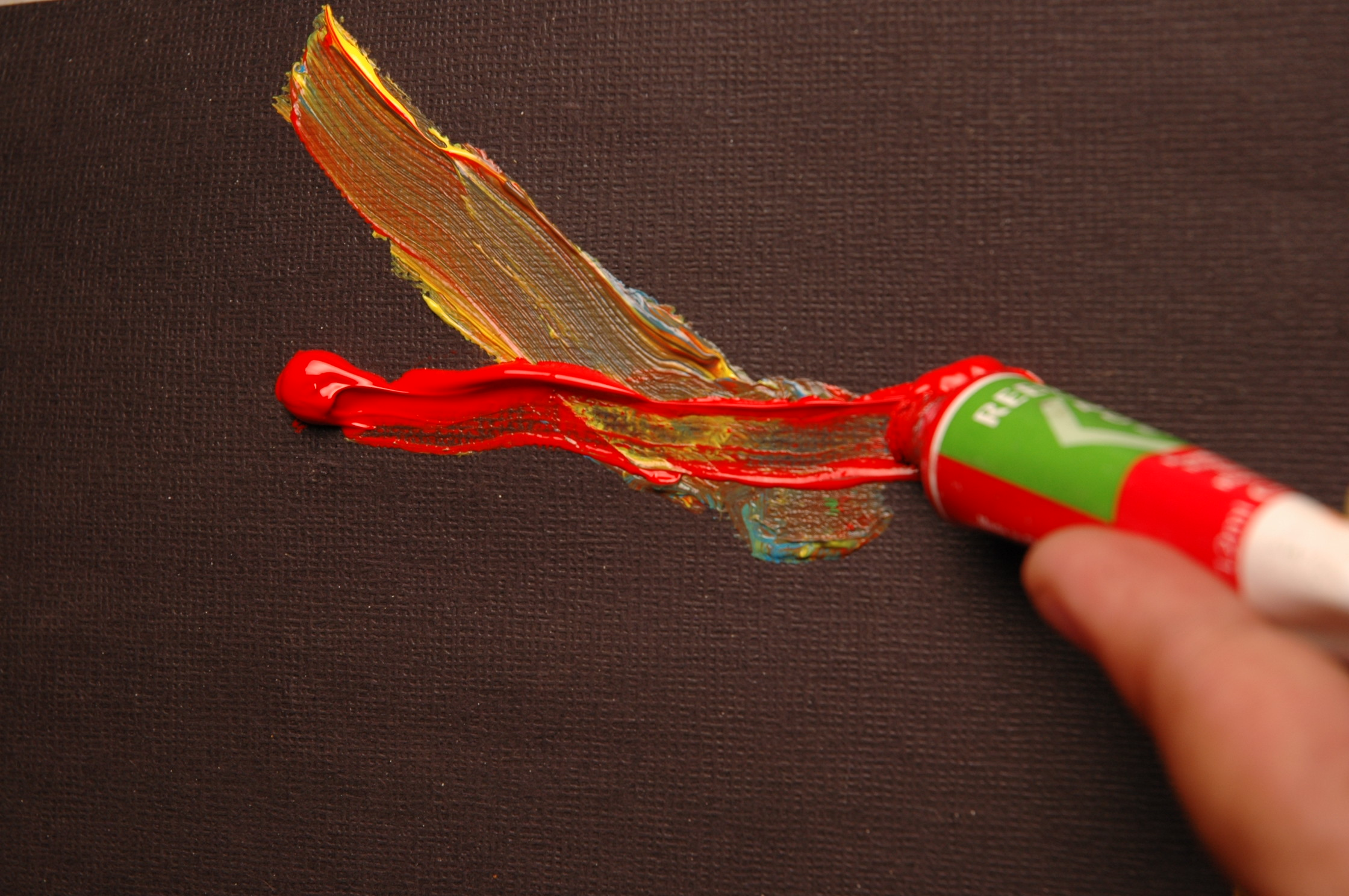
Example of acrylics applied over each other.

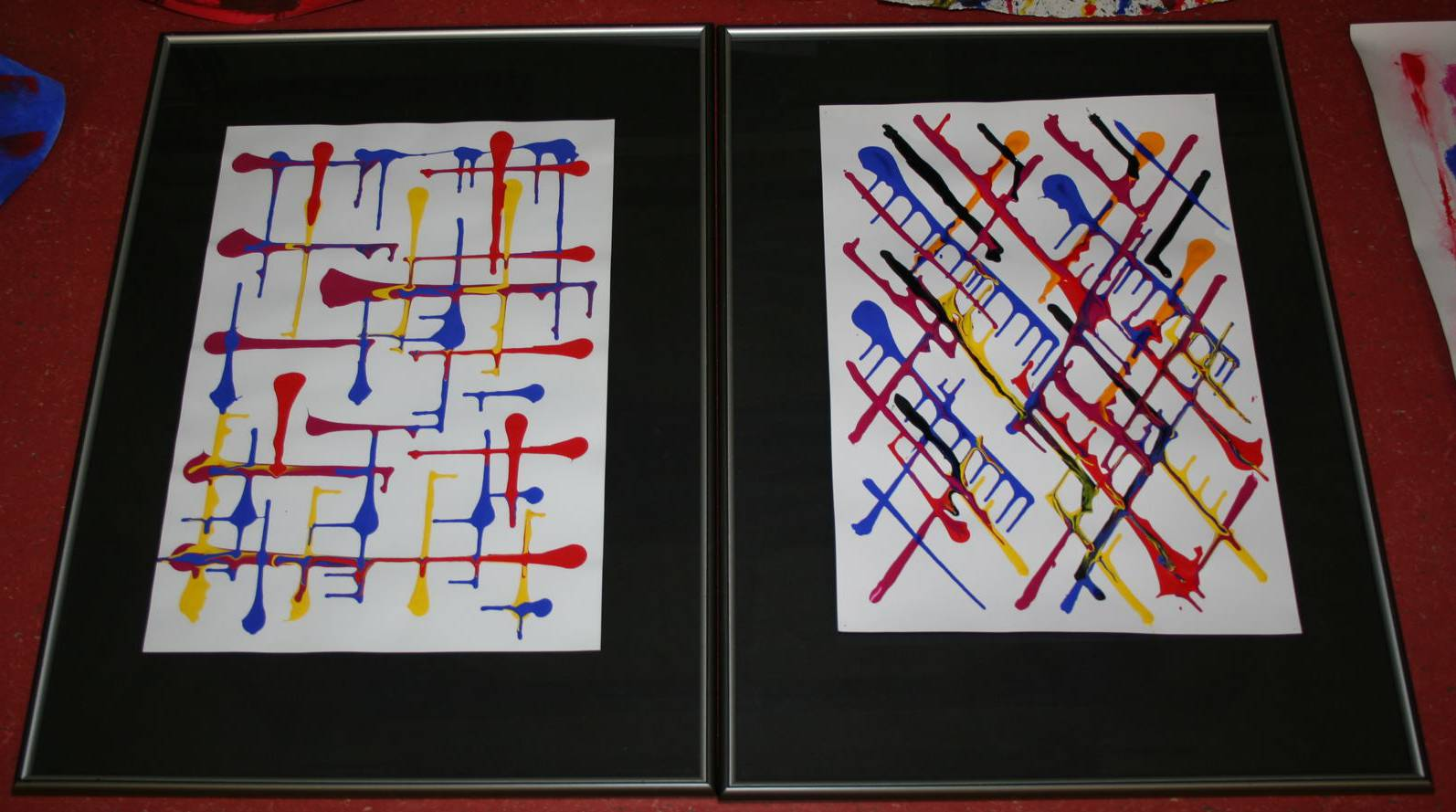
Experimental pictures with "floating" (Note: Here, the word describes a technique that allows more time before the paint dries.) acrylic paint

Acrylic paint is a fast-drying paint made of pigment suspended in acrylic polymer emulsion and plasticizers, silicone oils, defoamers, stabilizers, or metal soaps. Most acrylic paints are water-based, but become water-resistant when dry. Depending on how much the paint is diluted with water, or modified with acrylic gels, mediums, or pastes, the finished acrylic painting can resemble a watercolor, a gouache, or an oil painting, or it may have its own unique characteristics not attainable with other media.

Water-based acrylic paints are used as latex house paints, as latex is the technical term for a suspension of polymer microparticles in water. Interior latex house paints tend to be a combination of binder (sometimes acrylic, vinyl, PVA, and others), filler, pigment, and water. Exterior latex house paints may also be a co-polymer blend, but the best exterior water-based paints are 100% acrylic, because of its elasticity and other factors. Vinyl, however, costs half of what 100% acrylic resins cost, and polyvinyl acetate (PVA) is even cheaper, so paint companies make many different combinations of them to match the market.

== History ==
German chemist Otto Röhm invented acrylic resin, which led to the development of acrylic paint. In 1934, the first usable acrylic resin dispersion was developed by German chemical company BASF, and patented by Rohm and Haas. The synthetic paint was first used in the 1940s, displaying some properties of both oil and watercolor. Between 1946 and 1949, Leonard Bocour and Sam Golden invented a solution acrylic paint under the brand Magna paint. These were mineral spirit-based paints.

Water-based acrylic paints were subsequently sold as latex house paints.

Soon after the water-based acrylic binders were introduced as house paints, both individual artists and companies began to explore the new binders. Mexican mural painters like Diego Rivera, David Alfaro Siqueiros, and José Clemente Orozco were among the first to experiment with acrylic paint, impressed with its durability. Politec Acrylic Artists' Colors, water based acrylics useful for mural painting, started being produced and distributed in Mexico in 1953 by both individuals and companies. These acrylic paints began to phase out oil paint in mural art and abstract expressionism.

Over the 1960s Lancelot Ribeiro pioneered the use of acrylic paints for art in the UK because of his "increasing impatience" of the time it took for oil paints to dry, as also its "lack of brilliance in its colour potential." He took to the new synthetic plastic bases that commercial paints were beginning to use and soon got help from manufacturers like ICI, Courtaulds, and Geigy. The companies supplied him samples of their latest paints in quantities that he was using three decades later, according to the paper. Initially, the firms thought the PVA compounds would not be needed in commercially viable quantities. But they quickly recognised the potential demand and "so Ribeiro became the godfather of generations of artists using acrylics as an alternative to oils."

In 1956, José L. Gutiérrez produced Politec Acrylic Artists' Colors in Mexico, and Henry Levison of Cincinnati-based Permanent Pigments Co. produced Liquitex colors. These two product lines were the first acrylic emulsion artists' paints, with modern high-viscosity paints becoming available in the early 1960s, such as Derivan in Australia

== Painting with acrylics ==
Acrylic painters can modify the appearance, hardness, flexibility, texture, and other characteristics of the paint surface by using acrylic medium or simply by adding water. Watercolor and oil painters also use various mediums, but the range of acrylic mediums is much greater. Acrylics have the ability to bond to many different surfaces, and mediums can be used to modify their binding characteristics. Acrylics can be used on paper, canvas, and a range of other materials; however, their use on engineered woods such as medium-density fiberboard can be problematic because of the porous nature of those surfaces. In these cases, it is recommended that the surface first be sealed with an appropriate sealer. The process of sealing acrylic painting is called varnishing. Artists use removable varnishes over isolation coat to protect paintings from dust, UV rays, scratches, etc. This process is similar to varnishing an oil painting.

Acrylics can be applied in thin layers or washes to create effects that resemble watercolors and other water-based mediums. They can also be used to build thick layers of paint — gel and molding paste are sometimes used to create paintings with relief features. Acrylic paints are also used in hobbies such as trains, cars, houses, DIY projects, and human models. People who make such models use acrylic paint to build facial features on dolls or raised details on other types of models. Wet acrylic paint is easily removed from paintbrushes and skin with water, whereas oil paints require the use of a hydrocarbon.

Acrylics are the most common paints used in grattage, a surrealist technique that began to be used with the advent of this type of paint. Acrylics are used for this purpose because they easily scrape or peel from a surface.

=== Painting techniques ===
Acrylic artists' paints may be thinned with water or acrylic medium and used as washes in the manner of watercolor paints, but unlike watercolor the washes are not rehydratable once dry. For this reason, acrylics do not lend themselves to the color lifting techniques of gum arabic-based watercolor paints. Instead, the paint is applied in layers, sometimes diluting with water or acrylic medium to allow layers underneath to partially show through. Using an acrylic medium gives the paint more of a rich and glossy appearance, whereas using water makes the paint look more like watercolor and have a matte finish.

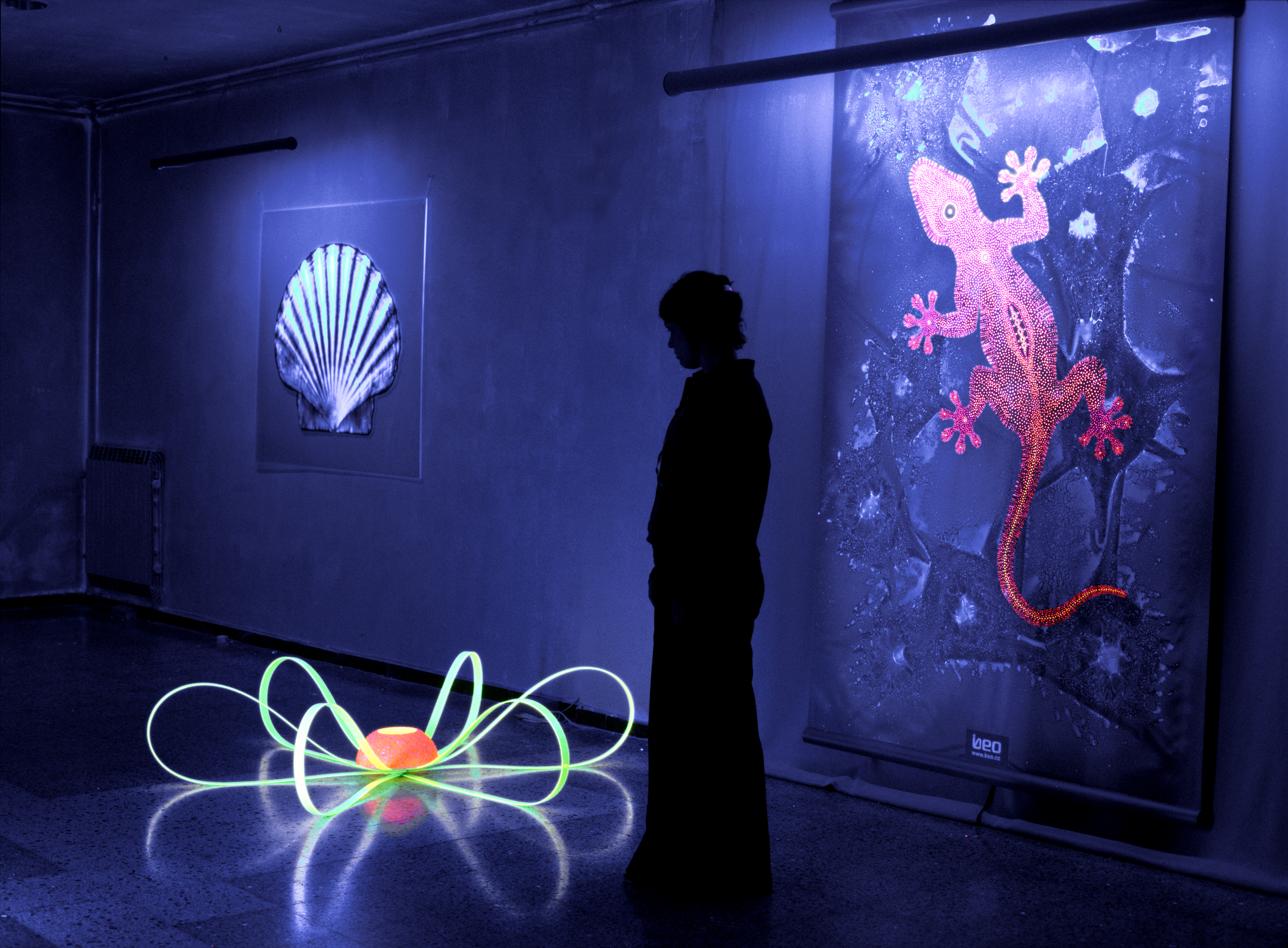
Fluorescent acrylic paints lit by UV light. Paintings by Beo Beyond.

Acrylic paints with gloss or matte finishes are common, although a satin (semi-matte) sheen is most common. Some brands exhibit a range of finishes (e.g. heavy-body paints from Matisse Derivan, Golden, Liquitex, Winsor & Newton and Daler-Rowney); Politec acrylics are fully matte. As with oils, pigment amounts and particle size or shape can affect the paint sheen. Matting agents can also be added during manufacture to dull the finish. If desired, the artist can mix different media with their paints and use topcoats or varnishes to alter or unify sheen.

When dry, acrylic paint is generally non-removable from a solid surface if it adheres to the surface. Water or mild solvents do not re-solubilize it, although isopropyl alcohol can lift some fresh paint films off. Toluene and acetone can remove paint films, but they do not lift paint stains very well and are not selective. The use of a solvent to remove paint may result in removal of all of the paint layers (acrylic gesso, et cetera). Oils and warm, soapy water can remove acrylic paint from skin. Acrylic paint can be removed from nonporous plastic surfaces such as miniatures or models using cleaning products such as Dettol (containing chloroxylenol 4.8% v/w).

An acrylic sizing should be used to prime canvas in preparation for painting with acrylic paints, to prevent Support Induced Discoloration (SID). Acrylic paint contains surfactants that can pull up discoloration from a raw canvas, especially in transparent glazed or translucent gelled areas. Gesso alone will not stop SID; a sizing must be applied before using a gesso.

The viscosity of acrylic can be successfully reduced by using suitable extenders that maintain the integrity of the paint film. There are retarders to slow drying and extend workability time, and flow releases to increase color-blending ability.

== Properties ==
=== Grades ===
Commercial acrylic paints come in two grades by manufacturers:

- Artist acrylics (professional acrylics) are created and designed to resist chemical reactions from exposure to water, ultraviolet light, and oxygen. Professional-grade acrylics have the most pigment, which allows for more medium manipulation and limits the color shift when mixed with other colors or after drying.
- Student acrylics have working characteristics similar to artist acrylics, but with lower pigment concentrations, less-expensive formulas, and fewer available colors. More expensive pigments are generally replicated by hues. Colors are designed to be mixed even though color strength is lower. Hues may not have exactly the same mixing characteristics as full-strength colors.

=== Varieties ===
- Heavy body acrylics are typically found in the Artist and Student Grade paints. "Heavy Body" refers to the viscosity or thickness of the paint. They are the best choice for impasto or heavier paint applications and will hold a brush or knife stroke and even a medium stiff peak. Gel Mediums ("pigment-less paints") are also available in various viscosities and used to thicken or thin paints, as well as extend paints and add transparency.
- Medium viscosity acrylics – Fluid acrylics, Soft body acrylics, or High Flow acrylics – have a lower viscosity but generally the same pigmentation as the Heavy Body acrylics. Available in either Artist quality or Craft quality, the cost and quality vary accordingly. These paints are good for watercolor techniques, airbrush application, or when smooth coverage is desired. Fluid acrylics can be mixed with any medium to thicken them for impasto work, or to thin them for glazing applications.
- Open acrylics were created to address the one major difference between oil and acrylic paints: the shortened time it takes acrylic paints to dry. Designed by Golden Artist Colors, Inc. with a hydrophilic acrylic resin, these paints can take anywhere from a few hours to a few days, or even weeks, to dry completely, depending on paint thickness, support characteristics, temperature, and humidity.
- Iridescent, pearl and interference acrylic colors combine conventional pigments with powdered mica (aluminium silicate) or powdered bronze to achieve complex visual effects. Colors have shimmering or reflective characteristics, depending on the coarseness or fineness of the powder. Iridescent colors are used in fine arts and crafts.
- Acrylic gouache is like traditional gouache because it dries to a matte, opaque finish. However, unlike traditional gouache, the acrylic binder makes it water-resistant once it dries. Like craft paint, it will adhere to a variety of surfaces, not only canvas and paper. This paint is typically used by water-colorists, cartoonists, or illustrators, and for decorative or folk art applications.
- Craft acrylics can be used on surfaces besides canvas, such as wood, metal, fabrics, and ceramics. They are used in decorative painting techniques and faux finishes to decorate objects of ordinary life. Although colors can be mixed, pigments are often not specified. Each color line is formulated instead to achieve a wide range of premixed colors. Craft paints usually employ vinyl or PVA resins to increase adhesion and lower cost.
- Interactive acrylics are all-purpose acrylic artists' colors which have the characteristic fast-drying nature of artists' acrylics, but are formulated to allow artists to delay drying when they need more working time, or re-wet their work when they want to do more wet blending.
- Exterior acrylics are paints that can withstand outdoor conditions. Like craft acrylics, they adhere to many surfaces. They are more resistant to both water and ultraviolet light. This makes them the acrylic of choice for architectural murals, outdoor signs, and many faux-finishing techniques.
- Acrylic glass paint is water-based and semi-permanent, making it a suitable paint for temporary displays on glass windows.
- Acrylic enamel paint creates a smooth, hard shell. It can be oven-baked or air dried. It can be permanent if kept away from harsh conditions such as dishwashing.

=== Differences between acrylic and oil paint ===
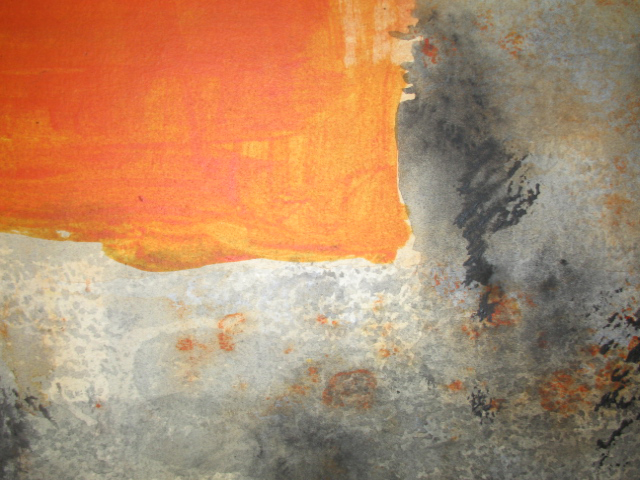
Detail of acrylic painting showing finishes that resemble both oil and watercolor

The vehicle and binder of oil paints is linseed oil (or another drying oil), whereas acrylic paint has water as the vehicle for an emulsion (suspension) of acrylic polymer, which serves as the binder. Thus, oil paint is said to be "oil-based", whereas acrylic paint is "water-based" (or sometimes "water-borne").

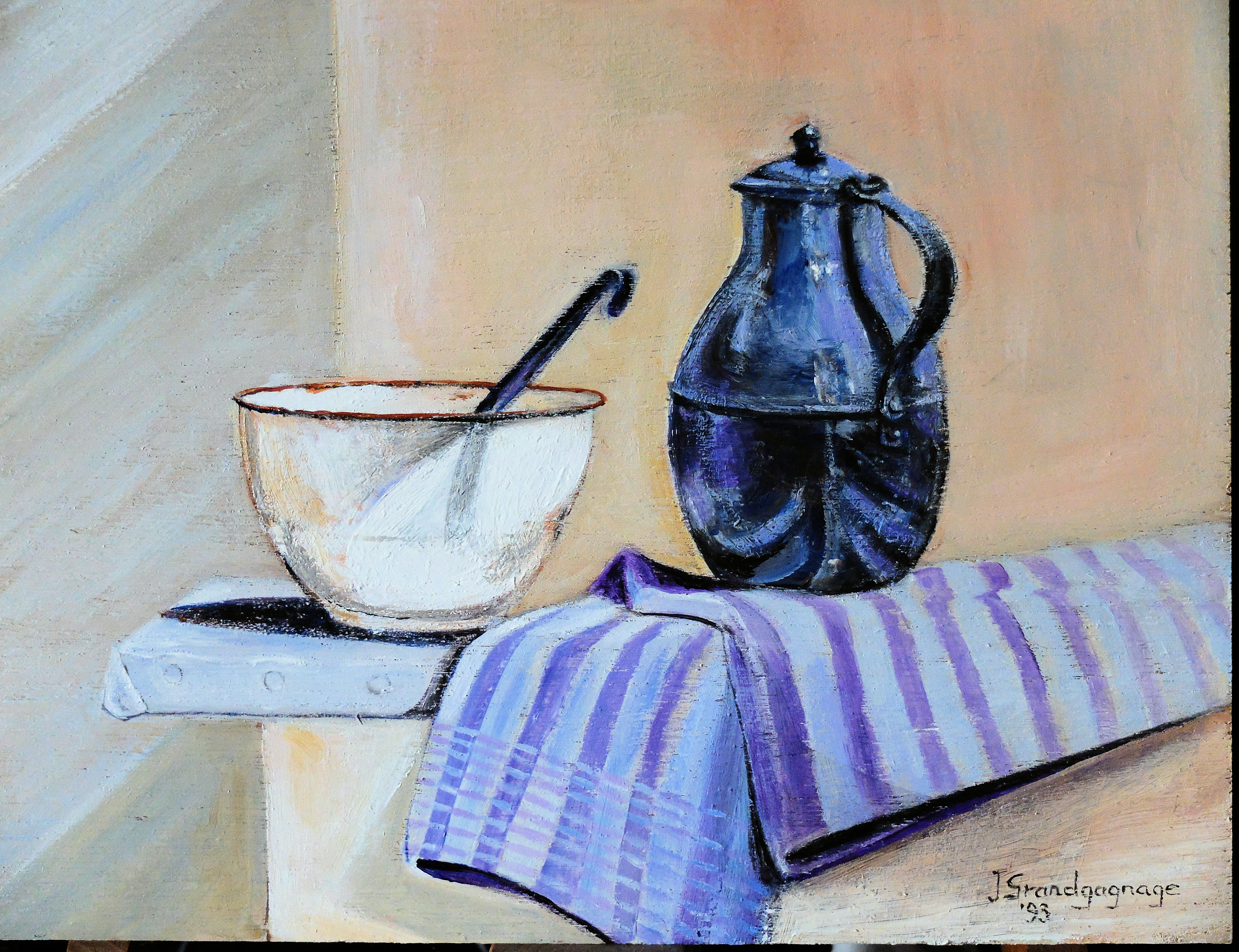
Example of blending technique with acrylics. Painting on wooden panel.

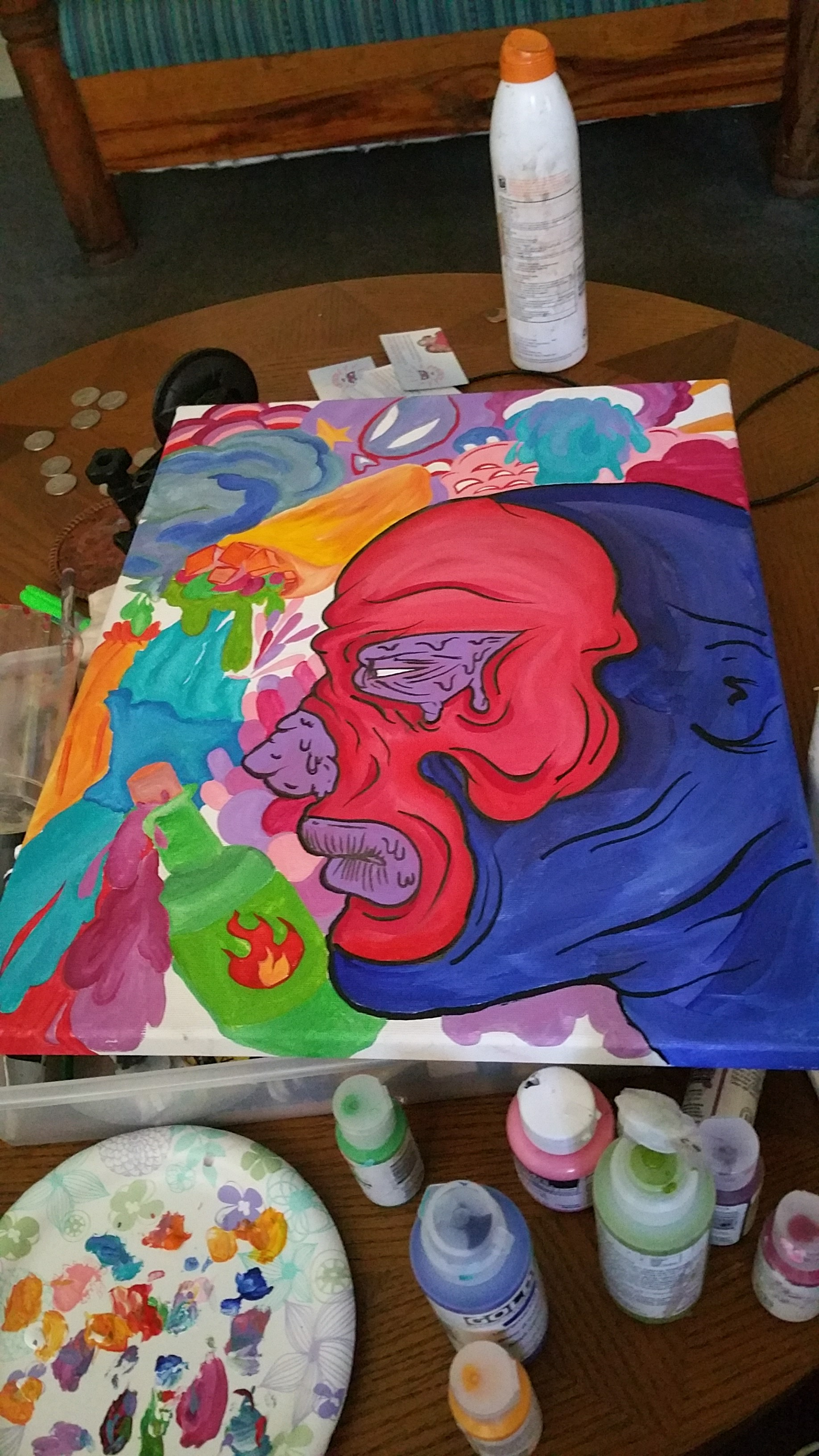
A demonstration of blending with acrylic paint. No retarders were used.

The main practical difference between most acrylics and oil paints is the inherent drying time. Oils allow for more time to blend colors and apply even glazes over underpaintings. This slow-drying aspect of oil can be seen as an advantage for certain techniques, but it impedes an artist trying to work quickly. The fast evaporation of water from regular acrylic paint films can be slowed with the use of acrylic retarders. Retarders are generally glycol or glycerin-based additives. The addition of a retarder slows the evaporation rate of the water.

Oil paints may require the use of solvents such as mineral spirits or turpentine to thin the paint and clean up. These solvents generally have some level of toxicity and can be found objectionable. Relatively recently, water-miscible oil paints have been developed for artists' use. Oil paint films can gradually yellow and lose their flexibility over time creating cracks in the paint film; the "fat over lean" rule must be observed to ensure its durability.

Oil paint has a higher pigment load than acrylic paint. As linseed oil contains a smaller molecule than acrylic paint, oil paint is able to absorb substantially more pigment. Oil provides a refractive index that is less clear than acrylic dispersions, which imparts a unique "look and feel" to the resultant paint film. Not all the pigments of oil paints are available in acrylics and vice versa, as each medium has different chemical sensitivities. Some historical pigments are alkali sensitive, and therefore cannot be made in an acrylic emulsion; others are just too difficult to formulate. Approximate "hue" color formulations, that do not contain the historical pigments, are typically offered as substitutes.

Because of acrylic paint's more flexible nature and more consistent drying time between layers, an artist does not have to follow the same rules of oil painting, where more medium must be applied to each layer to avoid cracking. It usually takes 10–20 minutes for one to two layers of acrylic paint to dry, depending on the brand, quality, and humidity levels of the surrounding environment. Some professional grades of acrylic paint can take 20–30 minutes or even more than an hour. Although canvas needs to be properly primed before painting with oils to prevent the paint medium from eventually rotting the canvas, acrylic can be safely applied straight to the canvas. The rapid drying of acrylic paint tends to discourage blending of color and use of wet-in-wet technique as in oil painting. Even though acrylic retarders can slow drying time to several hours, it remains a relatively fast-drying medium and adding too much acrylic retarder can prevent the paint from ever drying properly.

Meanwhile, acrylic paint is very elastic, which prevents cracking from occurring. Acrylic paint's binder is acrylic polymer emulsion – as this binder dries, the paint remains flexible.

Another difference between oil and acrylic paints is the versatility offered by acrylic paints. Acrylics are very useful in mixed media, allowing the use of pastel (oil and chalk), charcoal and pen (among others) on top of the dried acrylic painted surface. Mixing other bodies into the acrylic is possible—sand, rice, and even pasta may be incorporated in the artwork. Mixing artist or student grade acrylic paint with household acrylic emulsions is possible, allowing the use of premixed tints straight from the tube or tin, and thereby presenting the painter with a vast color range at their disposal. This versatility is also illustrated by the variety of additional artistic uses for acrylics. Specialized acrylics have been manufactured and used for linoblock printing, face painting, airbrushing, watercolor-like techniques, and fabric screen printing.

Another difference between oil and acrylic paint is the cleanup. Acrylic paint can be cleaned out of a brush with any soap, while oil paint needs a specific type to be sure to get all the oil out of the brushes. Also, it is easier to let a palette with oil paint dry and then scrape the paint off, whereas one can easily clean wet acrylic paint with water.

=== Difference between acrylic and watercolor paint ===
The biggest difference is that acrylic paint is opaque, whereas watercolor paint is translucent by nature. Watercolors take about 5 to 15 minutes to dry while acrylics take about 10 to 20 minutes. In order to change the tone or shade of a watercolor pigment, one changes the percentage of water mixed in to the color. For brighter colors, one adds more water. For darker colors, one adds less water. In order to create lighter or darker colors with acrylic paints, one adds white or black.

Another difference is that watercolors must be painted onto a porous surface, primarily watercolor paper. Acrylic paints can be used on many different surfaces.

Both acrylic and watercolor are easy to clean up with water. Acrylic paint should be cleaned with soap and water immediately following use. Watercolor paint can be cleaned with just water.
