= Antiseptic =

Antimicrobial substance or compound

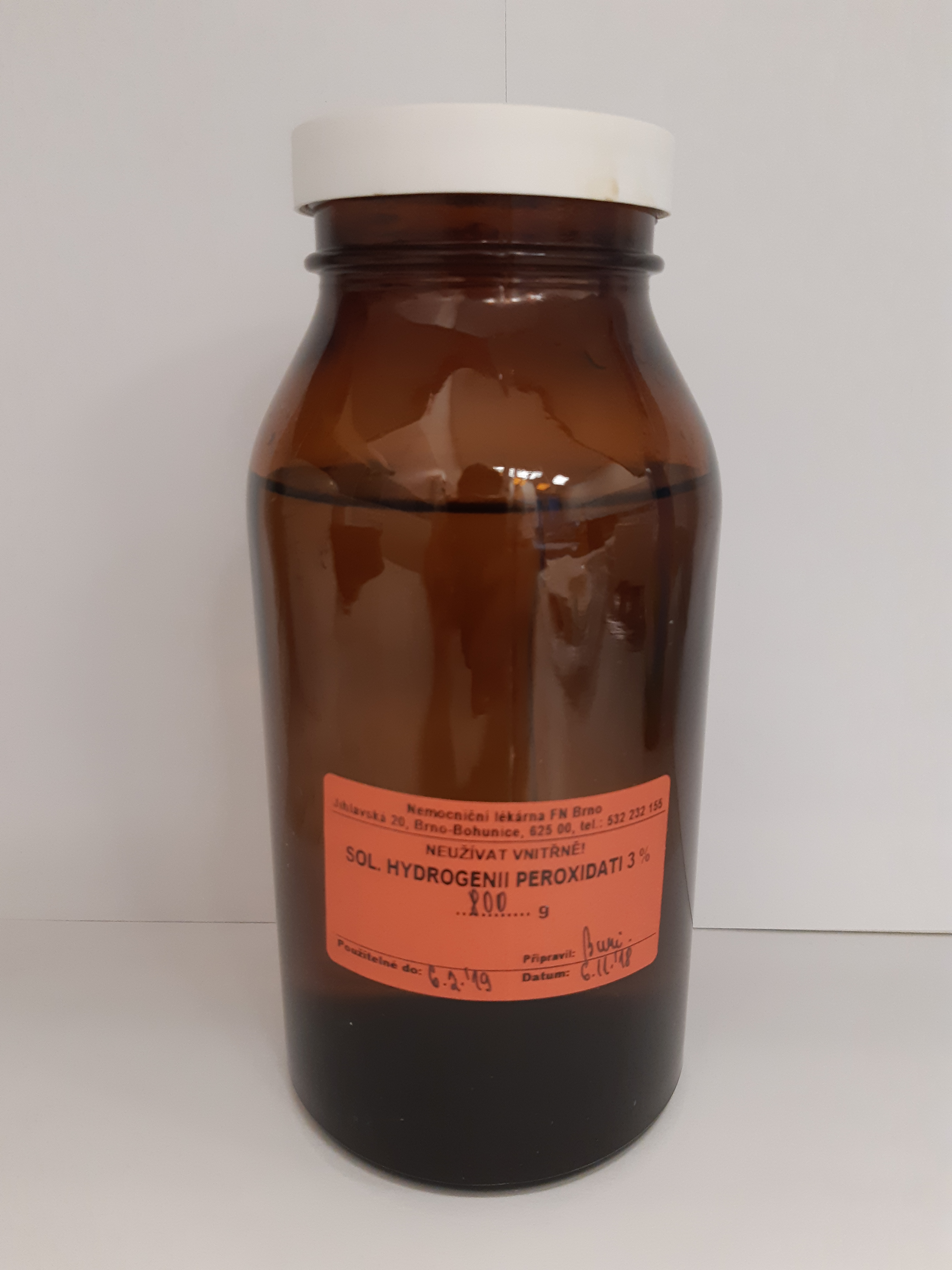
Hydrogen peroxide, a common antiseptic.

An antiseptic (Greek: ἀντί, romanized: anti, lit. 'against' and σηπτικός, sēptikos, 'putrefactive') is an antimicrobial substance or compound that is applied to living tissue to reduce the possibility of sepsis, infection, or putrefaction. Antiseptics are generally distinguished from antibiotics by the latter's ability to safely destroy bacteria within the body, and from disinfectants, which destroy microorganisms found on non-living objects.

Antibacterials include antiseptics that have the proven ability to act against bacteria. Microbicides which destroy virus particles are called viricides or antivirals. Antifungals, also known as antimycotics, are pharmaceutical fungicides used to treat and prevent mycosis (fungal infection).

== Surgery ==
Antiseptic practices evolved in the 19th century through multiple individuals. Ignaz Semmelweis showed already in 1847-1848 that hand washing prior to delivery reduced puerperal fever. Despite this, many hospitals continued to practice surgery in unsanitary conditions, with some surgeons taking pride in their bloodstained operating gowns.

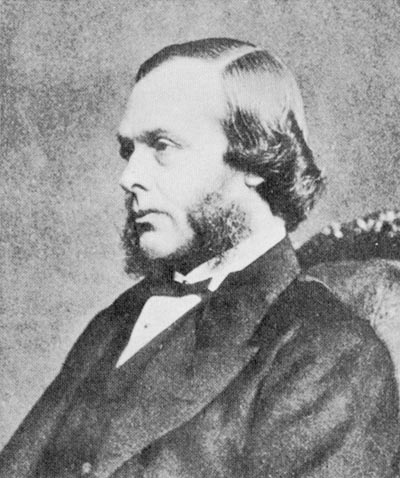
Joseph Lister

Only a decade later the situation started to change, when some French surgeons started to adopt carbolic acid as an antiseptic, reducing surgical infection rates, followed by their Italian colleagues in the 1860s. In 1867 Joseph Lister published seminal paper Antiseptic Principle of the Practice of Surgery, where he explained this reduction in terms of Louis Pasteur's germ theory. Thus he was able to popularize the antiseptic surgical methods in the English-speaking world.

Some of this work was anticipated by:

- Ancient Greek physicians Galen (c. 130–200) and Hippocrates (c. 400 BC) as well as Sumerian clay tablets dating from 2150 BC that advocate the use of similar techniques.
- Florence Nightingale, who contributed substantially to the report of the Royal Commission on the Health of the Army (1856–1857), based on her earlier work
- Medieval surgeons Hugh of Lucca, Theoderic of Servia, and his pupil Henri de Mondeville were opponents of Galen's opinion that pus was important to healing, which had led ancient and medieval surgeons to let pus remain in wounds. They advocated draining and cleaning the wound edges with wine, dressing the wound after suturing (if necessary), and leaving the dressing on for ten days, soaking it in warm wine all the while, before changing it. Their theories were bitterly opposed by Galenist Guy de Chauliac and others trained in the classical tradition.
- Oliver Wendell Holmes Sr., who published The Contagiousness of Puerperal Fever in 1843

== Some common antiseptics ==
Structure of povidone-iodine complex, the most common antiseptic in use today

Antiseptics can be subdivided into about eight classes of materials. These classes can be subdivided according to their mechanism of action: small molecules that indiscriminately react with organic compounds and kill microorganisms (peroxides, iodine, phenols) and more complex molecules that disrupt the cell walls of the bacteria.

- Alcohols, including ethanol and 2-propanol/isopropanol are sometimes referred to as surgical spirit. They are used to disinfect the skin before injections, among other uses.
- Diguanides including chlorhexidine gluconate, a bacteriocidal antiseptic which (with an alcoholic solvent) is considered a safe and effective antiseptic for reducing the risk of infection after clean surgery, including tourniquet-controlled upper limb surgery. It is also used in mouthwashes to treat inflammation of the gums (gingivitis). Polyhexanide (polyhexamethylene biguanide, PHMB) is an antimicrobial compound suitable for clinical use in critically colonized or infected acute and chronic wounds. The physicochemical action on the bacterial envelope prevents or impedes the development of resistant bacterial strains.
- Iodine, especially in the form of povidone-iodine, is widely used because it is well tolerated; does not negatively affect wound healing; leaves a deposit of active iodine, thereby creating the so-called "remnant", or persistent effect; and has wide scope of antimicrobial activity. The traditional iodine antiseptic is an alcohol solution (called tincture of iodine) or as Lugol's iodine solution. Some studies do not recommend disinfecting minor wounds with iodine because of concern that it may induce scar tissue formation and increase healing time. However, concentrations of 1% iodine or less have not been shown to increase healing time and are not otherwise distinguishable from treatment with saline. Iodine will kill all principal pathogens and, given enough time, even spores, which are considered to be the most difficult form of microorganisms to be inactivated by disinfectants and antiseptics.
- Octenidine dihydrochloride, currently increasingly used in continental Europe, often as a chlorhexidine substitute.
- Peroxides, such as hydrogen peroxide and benzoyl peroxide. Commonly, 3% solutions of hydrogen peroxide have been used in household first aid for scrapes, etc. However, the strong oxidization causes scar formation and increases healing time during fetal development.
- Phenols such as phenol itself (as introduced by Lister) and triclosan, hexachlorophene, chlorocresol, and chloroxylenol. The fact that the more substituted and more lipophylic phenols are less toxic, less irritant and more powerful was gradually discovered in late 19th century. Nowadays comparatively more water-soluble phenols such as chlorocresol are commonly used as preservatives in personal care products while less soluble such as chloroxylenol – as topical antiseptics. Both can be encountered in household disinfectants.
- Quat salts such as benzalkonium chloride/lidocaine (trade name Bactine among others), cetylpyridinium chloride, or cetrimide. These surfactants disrupt cell walls.
- Quinolines such as hydroxyquinolone, dequalium chloride, or chlorquinaldol.
- 4-Hexylresorcinol, or S.T.37

== See also ==
- Actinonin
- Henry Jacques Garrigues, introduced antiseptic obstetrics to North America
- Tobacco
