= Chloroxylenol =

Chemical compound commonly used in antiseptics

- Kekulé, skeletal formula of chloroxylenol

Names
- Preferred IUPAC name 4-Chloro-3,5-dimethylphenol
- Other names para-Chloro-meta-xylenol, PCMX, 4-Chloro-3,5-dimethylphenol, CHO

Identifiers
CAS Number	88-04-0
3D model (JSmol)	Interactive image
Beilstein Reference	1862539
ChEBI	CHEBI:34393
ChEMBL	ChEMBL398440
ChemSpider	21106017
ECHA InfoCard	100.001.631
EC Number	201-793-8
KEGG	D03473
MeSH	chloroxylenol
PubChem CID	2723
RTECS number	ZE6850000
UNII	0F32U78V2Q
CompTox Dashboard (EPA)	DTXSID0032316
- InChI: InChI=1S/C8H9ClO/c1-5-3-7(10)4-6(2)8(5)9/h3-4,10H,1-2H3 Key: OSDLLIBGSJNGJE-UHFFFAOYSA-N; InChI=1/C8H9ClO/c1-5-3-7(10)4-6(2)8(5)9/h3-4,10H,1-2H3 Key: OSDLLIBGSJNGJE-UHFFFAOYAY
- SMILES: Cc1cc(O)cc(C)c1Cl

Properties
Chemical formula	C_{8}H_{9}ClO
Molar mass	156.61 g·mol^{−1}
Melting point	115 °C (239 °F; 388 K)
Boiling point	246 °C (475 °F; 519 K)
Solubility in water	300 mg/L
Solubility in alcohols	soluble
Solubility in Ethers	soluble
Solubility in Benzene	soluble
log P	3.377
Acidity (pK_{a})	9.76
Basicity (pK_{b})	4.24

Pharmacology
ATC code	D08AE05 (WHO)

Hazards
- GHS labelling
Pictograms	(GHS07: Exclamation mark)
Signal word	Warning
Hazard statements	H302, H315, H317, H319
Precautionary statements	P280, P305+P351+P338
- Except where otherwise noted, data are given for materials in their standard state (at 25 °C [77 °F], 100 kPa). Infobox references

Chloroxylenol, also known as para-chloro-meta-xylenol (PCMX), is an organic compound with the formula (CH_{3})_{2}ClC_{6}H_{2}OH. It is a chlorinated derivative of xylenol. The compound is a colorless solid, although impure samples can appear off-white. It has a phenolic odor. It is a common antiseptic.

== Uses ==
Formulations containing chloroxylenol are used in hospitals and households as antiseptics, disinfectants, and sanitizers. It is commonly used in antibacterial soaps, wound-cleansing, and other household antiseptic applications. Chloroxylenol is used in various formulations and marketed under several brand names, including Dettol.

It is on the World Health Organization's List of Essential Medicines. When diluted, this chloroxylenol preparation is used as an antiseptic and disinfectant, and for skin disinfection. Diluted with alcohol, it is suitable for disinfecting medical instruments.

Chloroxylenol has been substituted for hexachlorophene and triclosan, which have been removed from world markets. It is currently used for control of bacteria, algae, and fungi in:

- Adhesive and sealant products
- Construction products
- Lubricant and grease products
- Paint and coating products
- Plastic and polymer products
- Wash tanks
- Diaper pails
- Laundry equipment
- Bedding
- Pet living quarters
- Hospitals
- Personal care products
- Cleaning and furniture care products
- Fabric, textile and leather products
- Ink, toner and colorant products

=== United States ===
Chloroxylenol was first introduced to the United States in 1959. Chloroxylenol containing products must not be used in any manner that allows contamination of water.

=== European Union ===
The European Union allows chloroxylenol in cosmetics up to 0.5%.

== Antimicrobial properties ==
Chloroxylenol is most effective against gram-positive bacteria. It works by disruption of the cell wall and stopping the function of enzymes. It is less effective than some other available agents. Testing has shown products containing chloroxylenol effective against the SARS-CoV-2 virus and orthopoxviruses. A meta-analysis found insufficient evidence to determine whether exposure creates bacterial resistance.

== Synthesis ==
Chloroxylenol is produced by chlorination of the corresponding xylenol.

== Toxicology ==
It "is safe as used in cosmetics". Chloroxylenol is generally slightly to moderately toxic to humans (but causes severe eye irritation), is practically non-toxic to birds, toxic to fish, and moderately toxic to freshwater invertebrates. The European Union considers it to be a skin sensitizer.

Chloroxylenol may also be harmful to smaller vertebrates, especially cats. Phenolic compounds are of particular concern to felines because cats are unable to fully metabolize them. A cat may swallow the product by licking its paws after it has come into contact with it. Products containing chloroxylenol such as Dettol have been previously administered with a spray bottle on unwanted pests or invasive species such as cane toads, which die shortly after being sprayed with the phenolic compound. The use of chloroxylenol-containing Dettol as an agent for pest control was banned in Western Australia by the Department of Environment and Conservation in 2011.

== History ==
The discovery of chloroxylenol was the result of efforts to produce improved antiseptics that began at the end of the 1800s, when it was realized that more substituted and more lipophilic phenols are less toxic, less irritating, and more powerful. First synthesized in Germany in 1923, it was born out of the study of coal tar components that began a decade earlier.

== Related compounds ==
- 4-chloro-3-methylphenol (PCMC) – similar use / similar structure
- 2-Chloro-m-cresol – Structural similarity
