= Antiseptic Principle of the Practice of Surgery =

1867 paper by Joseph Lister

"Antiseptic Principle of the Practice of Surgery" is a paper regarding antiseptics written by Joseph Lister in 1867.
