= Peptide deformylase =

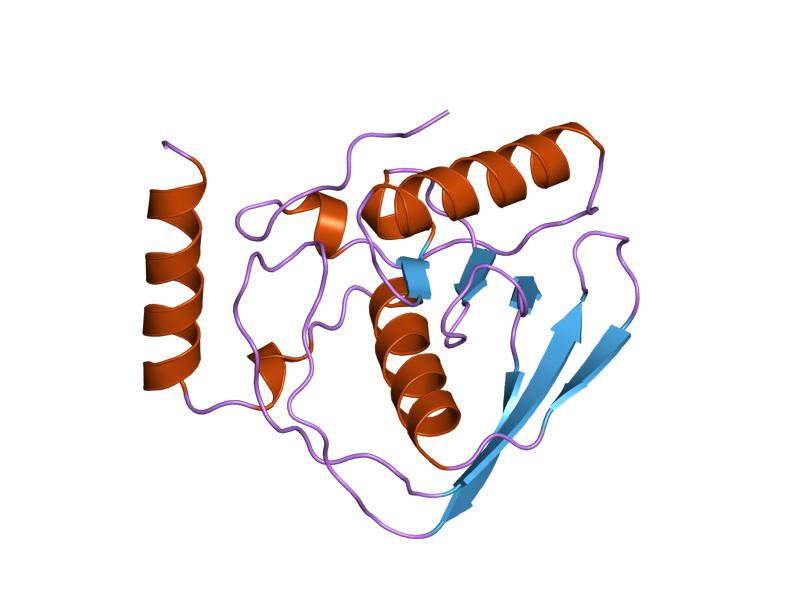
- Escherichia coli peptide deformylase structure

Identifiers
- EC no.: 3.5.1.88

Databases
- IntEnz: IntEnz view
- BRENDA: BRENDA entry
- ExPASy: NiceZyme view
- KEGG: KEGG entry
- MetaCyc: metabolic pathway
- PRIAM: profile
- PDB structures: RCSB PDB PDBe PDBsum
- Gene Ontology: AmiGO / QuickGO
Search
- PMC: articles
- PubMed: articles
- NCBI: proteins

In enzymology, a peptide deformylase (EC 3.5.1.88) is an enzyme that removes the formyl group from the N terminus of nascent polypeptide chains in eubacteria, mitochondria and chloroplasts.

Peptide deformylases are metaloenzymes monomers and bind a metal cofactor, typically Fe(II) or Zn, in an active site. Cofactor identity impacts catalytic efficiency.

There are two types of peptide deformylases, types I and II, which differ in structure mainly in the outer surface of the protein.

Human gene PDF (gene) possesses this activity.

== Function ==
Peptide deformylase removes the formyl group from the N terminus of nascent polypeptides as they are synthesized by the ribosome. The function of peptide deformylase can be described by the following equation, where formyl-L-methionyl peptide and water react under the formation of formate and methionyl peptide:

H_{2}O + formyl-L-methionyl peptide $\rightleftharpoons$ methionyl peptide + formate

Activity of peptide deformylase

This reaction takes place on the surface of the ribosome, where the C-terminal alpha-helix of the peptide deformylase interacts with a grove between ribosomal proteins uL22 and bL32, and rRNA.

For its function this enzyme belongs to the family of hydrolases, those acting on carbon-nitrogen bonds other than peptide bonds, specifically in linear amides. The systematic name of this enzyme class is formyl-L-methionyl peptide amidohydrolase.

== Structural studies ==
As of late 2007, 34 structures have been solved for this class of enzymes, with PDB accession codes 1IX1, 1LM4, 1LM6, 1LME, 1LQW, 1LQY, 1LRU, 1LRY, 1N5N, 1Q1Y, 1S17, 1SV2, 1SZZ, 1V3Y, 1VEV, 1VEY, 1VEZ, 1WS0, 1WS1, 1XEM, 1XEN, 1XEO, 1Y6H, 1ZXZ, 1ZY0, 1ZY1, 2AI7, 2AI8, 2AI9, 2AIA, 2AIE, 2EW5, 2EW6, and 2EW7.

== See also ==
- Actinonin
