= Pine oil =

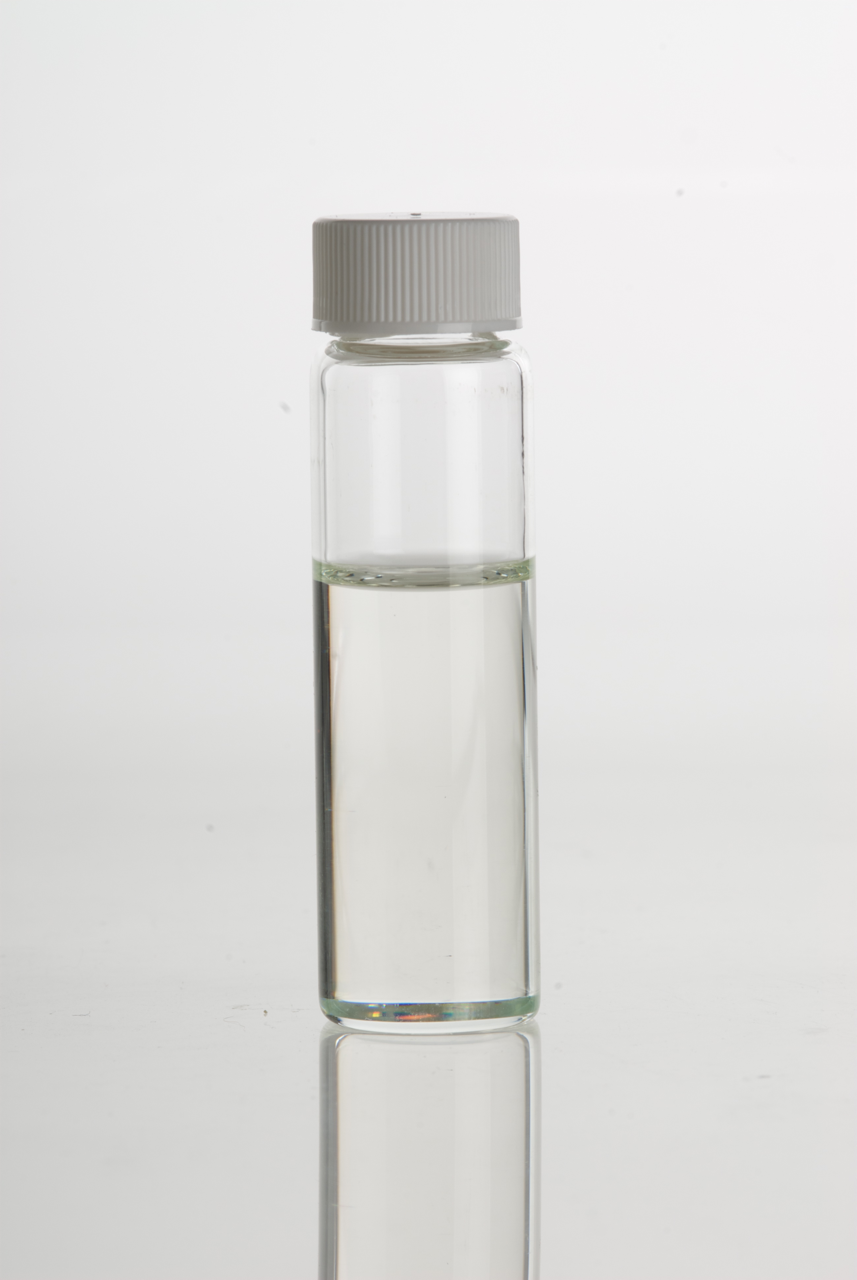
- Pine (Pinus sylvestris) essential oil in a clear glass vial

Names
- Other names Essential oil of pine Yarmor

Identifiers
CAS Number	8002-09-3
Beilstein Reference	8191505
ChemSpider	none
ECHA InfoCard	100.219.894
UNII	HA5CX6676U
CompTox Dashboard (EPA)	DTXSID2027670

Properties
Chemical formula	Mixture
Appearance	Colorless to pale yellow liquid
Density	0.875 g/cm^{3} at 25 °C (approximate)
Melting point	5 °C (41 °F; 278 K)
Boiling point	195 °C (383 °F; 468 K)
Solubility in water	Insoluble
log P	1.7
Vapor pressure	4 mmHg

Hazards
NFPA 704 (fire diamond)	2 2 0
Flash point	65 °C (149 °F; 338 K)
- Except where otherwise noted, data are given for materials in their standard state (at 25 °C [77 °F], 100 kPa). verify (what is ?) Infobox references

Pine oil is an essential oil obtained from a variety of species of pine, particularly Pinus sylvestris. Typically, parts of the trees that are not used for lumber — stumps, etc. — are ground and subjected to steam distillation. As of 1995, synthetic pine oil was the "biggest single turpentine derivative." Synthetic pine oils accounted for 90% of sales as of 2000.

== Composition ==
Pine oil is a higher boiling fraction from turpentine. Both synthetic and natural pine oil consists mainly of α-terpineol, a C10 alcohol (b.p. 214–217 °C). Other components include dipentene and pinene. The detailed composition of natural pine oil depends on many factors, such as the species of the host plant. Synthetic pine oil is obtained by treating pinene with water in the presence of a catalytic amount of sulfuric acid. This treatment results in hydration of the alkene and rearrangement of the pinene skeleton, yielding terpineols.

== Uses ==
Industrially, pine oil was once used in froth flotation for the separation of mineral from ores. For example, in copper extraction, pine oil is used to condition copper sulfide ores for froth flotation.

It is also used as a lubricant in small and expensive clockwork instruments.

In alternative medicine it is used in aromatherapy and as a scent in bath oils.

It is used as a solvent in artistic and restoration works.

=== Properties as a disinfectant ===
Pine oil is used as a cleaning product, disinfectant, sanitizer, microbicide (or microbistat), virucide or insecticide. It is an effective herbicide where its action is to modify the waxy cuticle of plants, resulting in desiccation. Pine oil is a disinfectant that is mildly antiseptic. It is effective against Brevibacterium ammoniagenes, the fungi Candida albicans, Enterobacter aerogenes, Escherichia coli, Gram-negative enteric bacteria, household germs, Gram-negative household germs such as those causing salmonellosis, herpes simplex types 1 and 2, influenza type A, influenza virus type A/Brazil, influenza virus type A2/Japan, intestinal bacteria, Klebsiella pneumoniae, odor-causing bacteria, mold, mildew, Pseudomonas aeruginosa, Salmonella choleraesuis, Salmonella typhi, Salmonella typhosa, Serratia marcescens, Shigella sonnei, Staphylococcus aureus, Streptococcus faecalis, Streptococcus pyogenes, and Trichophyton mentagrophytes.

=== Fuel ===
In the Second World War, pine oil was used in Japan as ersatz aviation fuel, since the blockade of Japan limited supplies of petroleum oils.

== Safety ==
With respect to the quality of indoor air, attention is directed to the effects of ambient ozone on pine oil components. Large doses may cause central nervous system depression.

== See also ==
- List of cleaning products
- Dettol antiseptic liquid
- Pine-Sol, cleaning product that originally contained pine oil, though it switched to a different active ingredient in 2013 due to the declining availability of pine oil
