= Pine-Sol =

Household cleaning product

- Product type: Cleanser
- Current owner: The Clorox Company
- Country: United States
- Introduced: 1929
- Markets: Worldwide
- Previous owners: Harry A. Cole; Shulton
- Ambassadors: Katie the Cleaning Lady, Diane Amos, Yvette Nicole Brown
- Website: pinesol.com

Pine-Sol is a registered trade name of the Clorox Company for a line of household cleaning products, used to clean grease and heavy soil stains. Pine-Sol was based on pine oil when it was created in 1929 and during its rise to national popularity in the 1950s. By 2016, Pine-Sol products sold in stores no longer contained pine oil, which was done to reduce costs.

== History ==
Pine-Sol detergent was invented by Harry A. Cole of Jackson, Mississippi, in 1929.

In 1948, entrepreneur Robert Earnest "Dumas" Milner acquired Magnolia Chemical, the Jackson, Mississippi supplier of Pine-Sol. Milner put Howard S. Cohoon in charge of the firm which had six employees: three salesmen and three who produced the product. In the following five years Cohoon turned the company into a multi-million dollar operation selling 20 million bottles throughout the United States and 11 other nations. Cohoon modernized the operation from manual bottling and labeling to full automation.

According to Cohoon, at that time pine oil was produced from old yellow pine tree stumps which were previously regarded as worthless. After Pine-Sol went national, Milner Company began a national radio advertising campaign starting with the Robert Q. Lewis show in 1952. By 1955 the Milner company had purchased Perma-Starch, of Illiopolis, Illinois, and by 1959 Milner had grown to a $1.5 million daytime TV advertising package and a $100,000 radio buy shared between Pine-Sol and Perma-Starch.

In January 1956, the Federal Trade Commission ordered Milner Company to cease and desist an advertising campaign that related to the false claims regarding the effectiveness of Pine-Sol compared to other pine oil containing products. Milner Company had previously agreed to cease and desist several other false claims about germicidal and bactericidal properties of Pine-Sol in March 1951. In February 1963, the Dumas Milner Company, including Pine-Sol facilities in Jackson, Miss., and Perma-Starch plant in Illiopolis, Ill., was taken over by Wayne, New Jersey, based American Cyanamid for stock valued at $17 million. Howard S. Cohoon was to remain in charge of the division.

The Pine-Sol brand was acquired by Clorox from American Cyanamid's Shulton Group in 1990. The 2005 version of the original 8% to 10% pine oil based cleaner was acidic (pH 3–4) and could be used to remove bacteria from household surfaces. However, some of the products now contain bases (pH 10–11).

There was also a dispute between Clorox and Reckitt Benckiser over potential consumer confusion regarding the fact that both Lysol and Pine-Sol end in "sol" and are used for cleaning. The issues spawned negotiations, agreements and lawsuits among several involved companies over the years from the 1960s to late 1990s.

== Formulation ==
According to 1950s Milner executive Howard S. Cohoon, producer of Pine-Sol, pine oil is formed only in large stumps from cut-over timber that has remained in the ground for "at least 20 years." It is not found in live pine trees. When asked about the risk of running out, Cohoon estimated in 1954 that there was "enough to last for another 35 years." He was not worried about a shortage as he claimed pine oil could be produced synthetically.

Although the original Pine-Sol formulation was pine oil-based, today the cleaners sold under the Pine-Sol brand contain no pine oil.

In 2006, The Clorox Company's product line included "Clorox Commercial Pine-Sol Brand Cleaner", with the same ingredients and concentrations as "Original Pine-Sol Brand Cleaner 1."

In 2008, the material safety data sheet for the "Original Pine-Sol Brand Cleaner 1" formulation listed 8–12% pine oil, 3–7% alkyl alcohol ethoxylates, 1–5% sodium petroleum sulfonate and 1–5% isopropyl alcohol.

In January 2013, Clorox began making a product called Original Pine-Sol Multi-Surface Cleaner which included glycolic acid while lacking any pine oil.

In January 2014, Clorox announced that Pine-Sol products would no longer contain pine oil, due to pine oil's limited supply and increased cost. In response to consumer requests for the original formula, Clorox made available a product containing 8.75% pine oil to online purchasers, but said it would not be sold in stores.

== Editions ==
Editions of Pine-Sol currently contain(ed) 10 editions, which include: Classic, Lemon Fresh, Refreshing Clean, Lavender Scent, Spring Blossom, All-Purpose, Mandarin Sunrise, Cherry Blossom, Strawberry Shine, and Magic Matcha.

== See also ==
- Dettol antiseptic liquid Pine oil based
