= Dettol antiseptic liquid =

Household cleaning product

Dettol antiseptic liquid is a product produced by the Dettol Brand for Reckitt. It is light yellow in color in the concentrated form but, as several of the ingredients are insoluble in water, it produces a milky emulsion of oil droplets when diluted with water, exhibiting the ouzo effect. Chloroxylenol comprises 4.8% of the admixture, with pine oil, isopropanol, castor oil, soap and water.

At first, this product was almost given the moniker "PCMX", after its active ingredient para-chloro-meta-xylenol. It would go on to become the first product in this very popular product line with its depiction of a white sword on a green bottle.

== Adverse use ==
Like other household cleaners, Dettol antiseptic liquid is poisonous and should not be ingested. It also should not be used undiluted. In rare cases, it may cause skin sensitization.

Excessive exposure to Dettol has the potential for causing death. It can be poisonous when swallowed or aspirated. It has been reported most cases of Dettol ingestion were intentional. However, only 7% suffered serious consequences.

Dettol is toxic to many animals, especially cats. Phenolic compounds are of particular concern because cats are unable to fully metabolize them. A cat may swallow the product by licking its paws after it has come into contact with it.

In Australia, Dettol in a spray bottle has been used to combat cane toads, as spraying the disinfectant kills the toads quickly. Owing to concerns over potential harm to other Australian wildlife species, the use of Dettol as an agent for pest control was banned in Western Australia by the Department of Environment and Conservation in 2011.

== See also ==
- List of Dettol branded products
- Pine-Sol
