= Dettol =

Brand of antiseptic and cleaning supplies

- Product type: Antiseptic
- Current owner: Reckitt Benckiser
- Country: United Kingdom
- Introduced: 1933; 93 years ago
- Related brands: Lysol, another product made by the same company Sagrotan; Dettox; Muse (in Japan and Thailand)
- Markets: Worldwide (except the United States)
- Website: dettol.co.uk

Dettol is a brand line of products used for disinfection and as an antiseptic. This brand was created with the introduction of Dettol antiseptic liquid in 1933 by the British-Dutch concern Reckitt Benckiser. The Dettol brand line has been expanded over the years and now includes products containing many different active ingredients. The name Dettol was invented by British scientist Lloyd Roake.
