= Acrylic retarder =

Substance added to acrylic paints

In painting, a retarder is a substance, usually a glycol and usually added to water, that is used to slow the drying time of acrylic paints, giving more time for blending or layering highlights.

== Use in fine art ==
Retarders are used to counter the fast drying properties of acrylic paints, making possible the usage of wet-on-wet or other techniques which would otherwise require oil paints. When used correctly, they can keep the paint wet from half an hour extra to a full day's working time. Applying too much retardant, however, can prevent a layer from drying correctly for as long as the retardant is present, causing future damage to the painting unless the affected layer of paint is removed or re-mixed.

== Content ==
They generally contain glycol (such as propylene glycol) or glycerin-based additives.

== Homemade ==
For homemade acrylic retarder, water glycerol down about 5:1 (water: glycerol) and apply to paint.
