= Actinonin =

Names
- Preferred IUPAC name (2R)-N^{4}-Hydroxy-N^{1}-{(2S)-1-[(2S)-2-(hydroxymethyl)pyrrolidin-1-yl]-3-methyl-1-oxobutan-2-yl}-2-pentylbutanediamide
- Other names HONH-Val-Pro-OH (IUPAC peptide linear)

Identifiers
CAS Number	13434-13-4
3D model (JSmol)	Interactive image
ChEMBL	ChEMBL308333
ChemSpider	391756
DrugBank	DB04310
PubChem CID	443600
UNII	P18SPA8N0K
CompTox Dashboard (EPA)	DTXSID70928580
- InChI: InChI=1S/C19H35N3O5/c1-4-5-6-8-14(11-16(24)21-27)18(25)20-17(13(2)3)19(26)22-10-7-9-15(22)12-23/h13-15,17,23,27H,4-12H2,1-3H3,(H,20,25)(H,21,24)/t14-,15+,17+/m1/s1 Key: XJLATMLVMSFZBN-VYDXJSESSA-N; InChI=1S/C19H35N3O5/c1-4-5-6-8-14(11-16(24)21-27)18(25)20-17(13(2)3)19(26)22-10-7-9-15(22)12-23/h13-15,17,23,27H,4-12H2,1-3H3,(H,20,25)(H,21,24)/t14-,15+,17+/m1/s1
- SMILES: O=C(N1[C@H](CO)CCC1)[C@@H](NC(=O)[C@H](CCCCC)CC(=O)NO)C(C)C

Properties
Chemical formula	C_{19}H_{35}N_{3}O_{5}
Molar mass	385.505 g·mol^{−1}
- Except where otherwise noted, data are given for materials in their standard state (at 25 °C [77 °F], 100 kPa). verify (what is ?) Infobox references

Actinonin is a naturally occurring antibacterial agent that has demonstrated anti-tumor activity.

Actiononin has been shown to inhibit the enzyme peptide deformylase, which is essential in bacteria.
