= 2-Chloro-m-cresol =

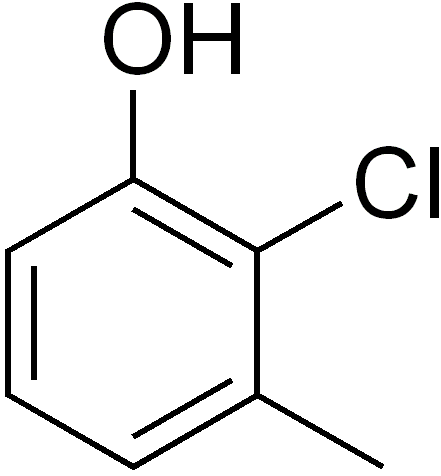

Names
- Preferred IUPAC name 2-Chloro-3-methylphenol
- Other names 2-Chloro-hydroxytoluene; 2-Chloro-m-cresol

Identifiers
CAS Number	608-26-4
3D model (JSmol)	Interactive image
ChemSpider	14162
PubChem CID	14852
UNII	XZT2VD3JL6
CompTox Dashboard (EPA)	DTXSID90209641
- InChI: InChI=1S/C7H7ClO/c1-5-3-2-4-6(9)7(5)8/h2-4,9H,1H3 Key: HKHXLHGVIHQKMK-UHFFFAOYSA-N; InChI=1/C7H7ClO/c1-5-3-2-4-6(9)7(5)8/h2-4,9H,1H3 Key: HKHXLHGVIHQKMK-UHFFFAOYAK
- SMILES: Clc1c(cccc1O)C

Properties
Chemical formula	C_{7}H_{7}ClO
Molar mass	142.5829
Density	1.228 g/cm^{3}

Hazards
Flash point	78.1 °C (172.6 °F; 351.2 K)
- Except where otherwise noted, data are given for materials in their standard state (at 25 °C [77 °F], 100 kPa). verify (what is ?) Infobox references

2-Chloro-m-cresol is a chlorinated cresol. The compound is difficult to synthesise as chlorination of m-cresol yields the para-product (4-chloro-3-methylphenol). Historically synthesis has been achieved via a para-selective nitration, followed by conversion to a diazonium compound and a Sandmeyer reaction to insert the chlorine into the 2-position.

== Related compounds ==
- 4-Chloro-3-methylphenol (PCMC) - similar structure
- 4-Chloro-3,5-dimethylphenol (PCMX) - similar structure
