= P-Chlorocresol =

Disinfectant and antiseptic

p-Chlorocresol
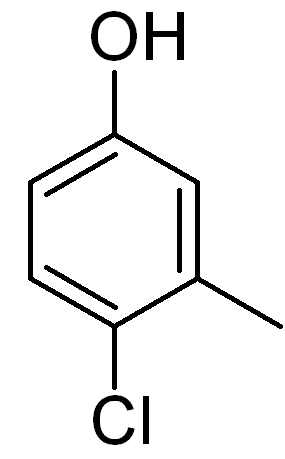

Names
- Preferred IUPAC name 4-Chloro-3-methylphenol
- Other names p-chloro-m-cresol; PCMC; Preventol; CMK

Identifiers
CAS Number	59-50-7
3D model (JSmol)	Interactive image
ChEBI	CHEBI:34395
ChEMBL	ChEMBL1230222
ChemSpider	21106018
ECHA InfoCard	100.000.392
EC Number	200-431-6
KEGG	C14331; D03468
PubChem CID	1732
RTECS number	GO7100000
UNII	36W53O7109
UN number	2669
CompTox Dashboard (EPA)	DTXSID4021717
- InChI: InChI=1S/C7H7ClO/c1-5-4-6(9)2-3-7(5)8/h2-4,9H,1H3 Key: CFKMVGJGLGKFKI-UHFFFAOYSA-N; InChI=1/C7H7ClO/c1-5-4-6(9)2-3-7(5)8/h2-4,9H,1H3 Key: CFKMVGJGLGKFKI-UHFFFAOYAE
- SMILES: Oc1ccc(Cl)c(C)c1

Properties
Chemical formula	C_{7}H_{7}ClO
Molar mass	142.58 g·mol^{−1}
Appearance	White solid
Odor	Phenolic
Density	1.37 g/cm^{3} (20 °C)
Melting point	55.55 °C (131.99 °F; 328.70 K)
Boiling point	235 °C (455 °F; 508 K)
Solubility in water	3.8 g/L at 20 °C (in water)

Hazards
- GHS labelling
Pictograms	(GHS05: Corrosive) (GHS07: Exclamation mark) (GHS09: Environmental hazard)
Signal word	Danger
Hazard statements	H302, H314, H317, H335, H400, H412
Precautionary statements	P260, P264, P270, P271, P272, P273, P280, P301+P312, P301+P330+P331, P302+P352, P303+P361+P353, P304+P340, P305+P351+P338, P310, P312, P321, P330, P333+P313, P363, P391, P403+P233, P405, P501
Flash point	118 °C (244 °F; 391 K)

Related compounds
Related compounds	Chloroxylenol (4-chloro-3,5-dimethylphenol)
- Except where otherwise noted, data are given for materials in their standard state (at 25 °C [77 °F], 100 kPa). verify (what is ?) Infobox references

p-Chlorocresol, or 4-chloro-3-methylphenol (ClC_{6}H_{3}CH_{3}OH), also known as p-chloro-m-cresol, is a potent disinfectant and antiseptic. It appears as a pinkish white crystalline solid. It is also used as a preservative in cosmetics and medicinal products for both humans and animals. It is used as an active ingredient in some preparations of veterinary medicines for topical, oral and parenteral use. Normally, the concentration of p-Chlorocresol in oral and parenteral veterinary products are 0.1-0.2%. Concentrations are higher (~0.5%) in topical veterinary products. p-Chlorocresol contains microbial activity against both gram positive and gram negative bacteria and fungi.

The use of p-Chlorocresol is regulated by government agencies such as the US Food and Drug administration, and limits are set on the amount of p-Chlorocresol that can be present in various products.

Chlorocresol was first introduced as a bactericide in 1897 by Kalle & Co. after scientists gradually discovered that more substituted and more lipophylic phenols are less toxic, less irritant and more powerful.

== Synthesis ==
p-Chlorocresol is synthesized from the monochlorination of 3-methylphenol at position 4.

== Metabolism ==
The biodegradation of p-Chlorocresol is done in the liver, and then excreted primarily via the kidneys or in smaller amounts through the lungs. In facultative Thauera sp. strain DO, p-Chlorocresol was degraded aerobically either by dehalogenation followed by catechol degradation pathway, or methyl oxidation to 4-chlorobenzoate. The exact reaction mechanism in humans is unknown.

== Reactions and mechanisms ==
=== Oxidation ===
The oxidation reaction of p-Chlorocresol by hydrogen peroxide (H_{2}O_{2}) can occur through a two-step process. In the first step, H_{2}O_{2} is activated by a catalyst, such as a metal ion or an enzyme, to form a reactive oxygen species, such as a hydroxyl radical (HO•). This reactive species can then attack the aromatic ring of the 4-chloro-3-methylphenol molecule, leading to the formation of a quinone intermediate.

The quinone intermediate is an important intermediate in many biological and chemical processes. It can undergo further oxidation to form a variety of compounds, including hydroquinones, catechols, and benzoquinones. In the case of p-Chlorocresol, the quinone intermediate can be further oxidized to form 4-chlorocatechol, which is a catechol compound.

=== Esterification ===
The esterification reaction of p-Chlorocresol with acetic anhydride to obtain 4-chloro-3-methylphenyl acetate.

Step 1: Protonation of the phenol group Acetic anhydride is a source of acetyl cation (CH_{3}CO^{+}). In the presence of a Lewis acid catalyst like sulfuric acid, the acetyl cation can react with the lone pair of electrons on the oxygen atom of the phenol group of p-Chlorocresol to protonate it, forming a resonance-stabilized carbocation intermediate.

Step 2: Nucleophilic attack of the carbocation intermediate by acetic anhydride The carbocation intermediate is attacked by the nucleophilic oxygen atom of an acetic anhydride molecule, which results in the formation of a new bond between the carbocation and the acetyl group. This leads to the formation of an intermediate with an acylated phenol ring.

Step 3: Deprotonation of the intermediate The intermediate formed in Step 2 is then deprotonated by water or the acid catalyst, which regenerates the catalyst and releases the 4-chloro-3-methylphenyl acetate product.

=== Dehalogenation ===
Dehalogenation of p-chlorocresol to remove the chlorine atom. Biological dehalogenation can be used to remove halogens from organic molecules. This process involves the use of microorganisms such as bacteria or fungi that have the ability to break down and remove halogens from compounds. However, the use of biological methods for dehalogenation is still relatively new and requires further research and development.

== Indications ==
p-Chlorocresol is a potent disinfectant and antiseptic agent due to its antimicrobial and antifungal properties and is therefore used for wound and skin disinfection. It also has preservative properties and is commonly found in topical creams and cosmetics. These properties also allow it to be used in paints and inks.

== Molecular mechanism of action ==
A phenolic preservative agent, the bacteriostatic mechanism of p-Chlorocresol arises from its ability to induce cytoplasmic leakage in bacteria, disrupting membrane permeability to potassium and phosphate ions. Cytoplasmic leakage also results in dissipation of the proton motive force, causing uncoupling of respiration from ATP synthesis.

== Efficacy ==
p-Chlorocresol has been shown to be effective as a bactericide in handwash at 0.2% 2/2 a.s in 60 seconds with 6 ml applied. It is also effective against prions such as scrapie in hamsters.

As an ingredient in cosmetic creams and lotions, p-chlorocresol has a 75% dermal absorption value. Up to 100% dermal absorption may be possible when it is dermally applied to broken skin (eg. for eczema).

== Adverse effects ==
Allergic contact dermatitis resulting from hypersensitivity to p-Chlorocresol has been reported, and it is classified as hazardous with the risk phrase “May cause sensitisation by skin contact’ in the HSIS (Safe Work Australia). However, Draize tests conducted on human subjects showed no positive reactions among healthy male subjects at 5%, 10% and 20% chlorocresol via dermal route.

There has been a documented case of recurrent unilateral facial palsy of a woman after exposure to p-chlorocresol. The brief neurological disturbance was relieved by exposure to fresh air and was determined to be a result of pharmacological hyperreactivity.

== Toxicity ==
Human exposure to p-Chlorocresol is mostly through body lotions as it is not found naturally in the environment. Above the critical effect level (21 mg/ kg/ bw/ day), p-chlorocresol exposure may result in a decrease in absolute adrenal gland weights. In 2021, it was classified as a compound that may constitute a danger to human life or health by the Government of Canada as the margins of exposure of the critical effect level and the estimated levels of exposure were considered inadequate.

Similar to phenol, neurolytic effects have also been reported for chlorocresol. However, this reaction is rare and may be due to interindividual hypersensitivity.

p-Chlorocresol does not significantly bioaccumulate in organisms due to low Kow and bioconcentration factors. It is not found to be genotoxic or carcinogenic and has been safely used in human medicine for many years.

Effects on animals Effects on animals p-Chlorocresol has low to moderate acute oral toxicity in rats and mice, with a median lethal dose (LD50) of 1830 mg/kg in male Wistar rats. It has also been shown to be corrosive to the skin of New Zealand White rabbits when applied dermally, and an irritant to rabbit eyes. Similar reactions have been recorded in Pirbright White guinea pigs. However, p-Chlorocresol has also been used as a disinfectant to reduce the infectivity levels of hamsters infected with scrapies, showing its effectiveness as an antiseptic even in animals.

A Committee for Veterinary Medicinal Products found p-Chlorocresol to be rapidly metabolized and excreted with no potential to accumulate in tissues and of low toxicity. In rats, up to 95% of the p-Chlorocresol was excreted via the urine and 0.4% in the faeces within 24 hours.

== See also ==
- Cresol
- Chloroxylenol - also used as an antiseptic and disinfectant
- 2-Chloro-m-cresol - Structural similarity
