= Food contact materials =

Materials that are intended to be in contact with food

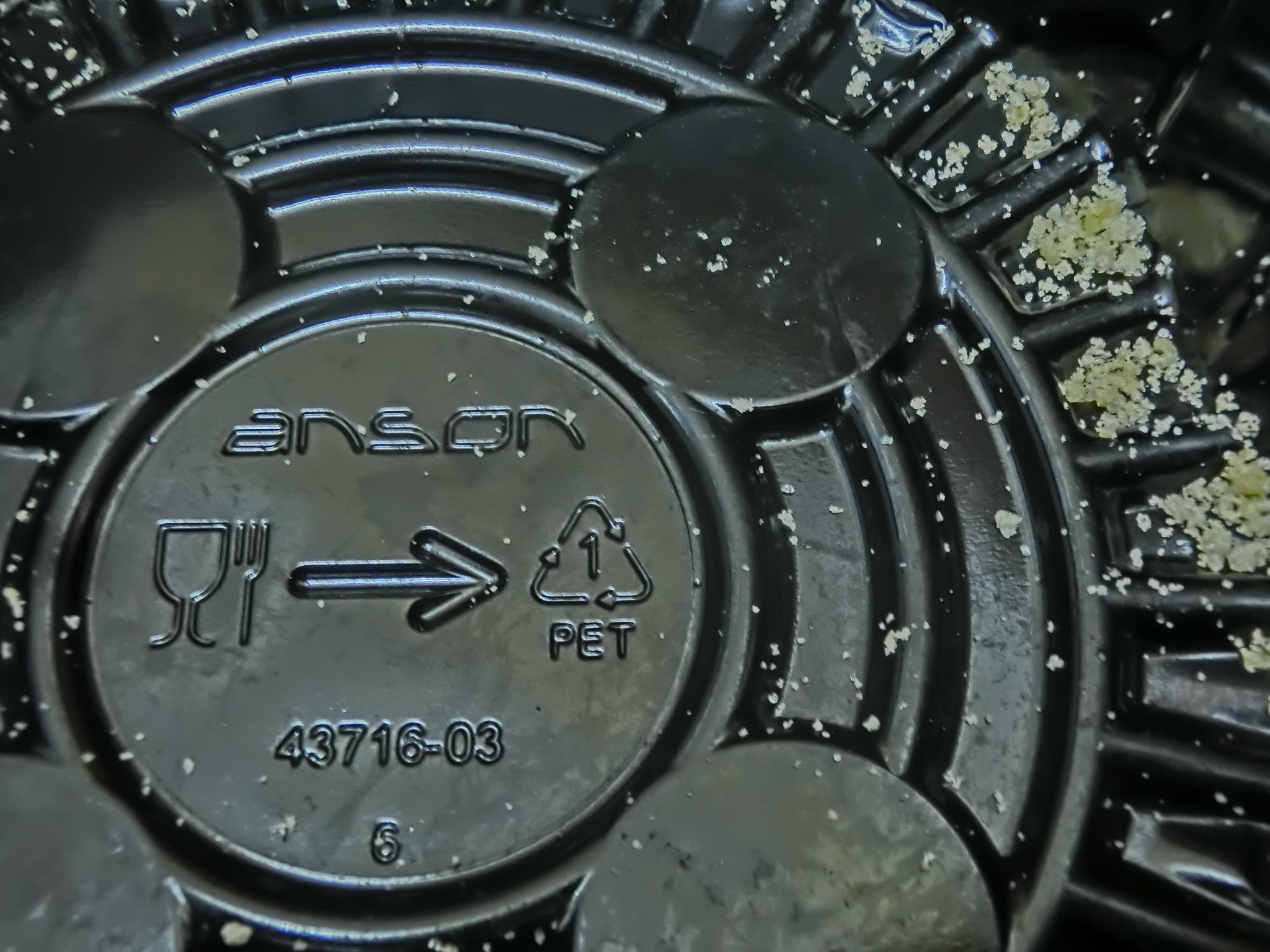
Food contact material pictogram (left) on a plastic food container in Hong Kong

Food contact materials or food contacting substances (FCS) are materials that are intended to be in contact with food. These include containers like a glass or a can for soft drinks as well as machinery in a food factory or a coffee machine.

Food contact materials can be constructed from a variety of materials, including plastics, rubber, paper, coatings, metal, etc. In many cases, a combination is used; for example, a carton box for juices can include (from the inside to the outside) a plastic layer, aluminum, paper, printing, and top coating.

During contact with the food, molecules can migrate from the food contact material to the food, for example, via blooming. Because of this, many countries regulate these food contact chemicals to ensure food safety.

== Food safe symbol ==
The wine glass and fork symbol

The international symbol for "food safe" material is a wine glass and a fork symbol. The symbol indicates that the material used in the product is considered safe for food contact. This includes food and water containers, packaging materials, cutlery etc. The regulation is applicable to any product intended for food contact whether it be made of metals, ceramics, paper and board, and plastics or the coating. Use of the symbol is more significant in products which should be explicitly identified whether food safe or not, i.e. wherever there is an ambiguity whether the container could be used to hold foodstuffs. The symbol is used in North America, Europe and parts of Asia. It is mandatory for products sold in Europe after the Framework Regulation EC 1935/2004.

In plastic containers, over and above the prescribed resin identification codes (e.g.,,,,), the food safe assurance is required because the resin identification codes do not explicitly communicate the food safe property (or more significantly, the lack of it).

Even though the legal requirement in various nations would be different, the food safe symbol generally assures that:

1. The container surface is free of any toxic contaminants which could be contacted from the manufacturing process.
2. The container material shall not potentially become a source of toxic contamination through usage (degeneration). This is assured by estimating and regulating the "migration limits" of the material. In EU regulation, the overall migration is limited to 10 mg of substances/dm² of the potential contact surface. The specific migration for various materials would be different for different temperature levels (of food as well as storage) and for different food items depending on variables such as pH of the food stuff. The toxicity considerations of a specific material may include the carcinogenity of the substance. The regulations governing these aspects may vary in different nations.

The "food safe" symbol doesn't guarantee food safety under all conditions. The composition of materials contacting foodstuffs aren't the only factor controlling carcinogen migration into foodstuffs; there are other factors that can have a significant role in food safety. Examples include: the temperature of food products, the fat content of the food products and total time of contact with a surface. The safety of foam food containers is currently debated and is a good example of all three of these factors at play. Polystyrene may melt when in contact with hot or fatty foods and may pose a safety risk. In the United States, materials in contact with food may not contain more than 1% residual styrene monomers by weight (0.5% for fatty foods).

Bisphenol A Diglycidyl ether-based epoxy coatings are extensively used for coating the inside of cans which come into contact with food and are thus food contact materials. The materials and analogues and conjugates have been extensively tested for and analytical methods developed.

== Legislation ==
=== European Union ===
The framework Regulation (EC) No. 1935/2004 applies to all food contact materials. Article 3 contains general safety requirements such as not endanger human health, no unacceptable change in the composition and no deterioration of the organoleptic characteristics. Article 4 set out special requirements for active and intelligent materials. Article 5 specifies measures for groups of materials that may be detailed in separate regulations of directives. Member States may maintain or adopt national provisions (Article 6). Articles 7–14 and 22–23 deal with the requirements and application for authorisation of a substance, modification of authorisation, the role of the European Food Safety Authority, the Member States and the Community. Article 15 is about labeling of food contact materials not yet in contact with food. Article 16 requires a declaration of compliance and appropriate documentation that demonstrate compliance. Articles 17–21 deal with traceability, safeguard measures, public access of applications, confidentiality, and data sharing. Article 24 sets out the inspection and control measures.

Specific measures for materials and articles such as ceramics, regenerated cellulose, plastics, gaskets and active and intelligent materials, and substances such as vinyl chloride, N-nitrosamines and N-nitrostable substances in rubber, and epoxy derivatives, exist.

EU No 10/2011 is the applicable regulation for all the materials intended to be used in contact with food. Its annex 1 contains a positive list of permitted ingredients.

=== United States ===
The U.S. Food and Drug Administration (FDA) considers three different types of food additives:

- Direct food additives – components added directly to the food
- Secondary direct food additives – components that are added to the food due to food treatment like treating food with ionic resins, solvent extraction
- Indirect food additives – substances that may come into contact with food as part of packaging or processing equipment, but are not intended to be added directly to food

The food contact materials are described in the Code of Federal Legislation (CFR): 21 CFR 174 – 21 CFR 190. Important starting points are:

- 21 CFR 175 Indirect food additives: Adhesives and components of coatings
- 21 CFR 176 Indirect food additives: Paper and paperboard components
- 21 CFR 177 Indirect food additives: Polymers

To this materials additives may be added. Which additives depend on the additive and on the material in which it is intended to be used. There must be a reference to the paragraph in which the additive is mentioned and the restrictions (for example only to be used in polyolefines) and limitations (max 0.5% in the final product) must be respected. See below for part in which additives are described: 21 CFR 170 Food additives

- 21 CFR 171 Food additive petitions
- 21 CFR 172 Food additives permitted for direct addition to food for human consumption
- 21 CFR 173 Secondary direct food additives permitted in food for human consumption
- 21 CFR 178 Indirect food additives: Adjuvants, production aids, and sanitizers
- 21 CFR 180 Food additives permitted in food or in contact with food on an interim basis pending additional study

Polymers or additives can also be regulated in other ways with exemptions; for example:

- Threshold of regulation
- Food contact notification
- Private letters
- Prior sanctioned food ingredient
- Generally recognized as safe (GRAS)

Redbook 2000 provides core FDA guidelines for toxicity testing of direct food additives and extends to food contact substances.

== Food contact chemicals ==
Food contact chemicals (FCCs) are chemical substances used or present in materials and articles that come into contact with food during processing, packaging, storage, or consumption. Food contact materials include glass, plastic, aluminium, steel, paper, cardboard, adhesives, printing inks, and coatings. They are used in various food contact articles, e.g., food wrappers, glasses, mugs, bottles, coffee machines, conveyor belts, cutlery, or pots.

During contact with the food, food contact chemicals can migrate from these materials to the food. Chemical migration depends on the temperature, the contact time (during processing or storage), the ratio of material surface to the volume of the food, the type of food contact material, the physico-chemical properties of the food contact chemical, and the type of food.

Examples of food contact chemicals include monomers, additives, pigments, and metals that are used in the manufacture of food contact materials, but also non-intentionally added substances such as contaminants, degradation products, and reaction side products. Commonly used monomers are styrene, terephthalic acid, mono ethylene glycol, ethylene, vinyl chloride, and bisphenols (e.g, Bisphenol A, or Bisphenol S). Additives include plasticizers like ortho-phthalates (e.g., DEHP, or DINP) or organophosphate esters (e.g., Triphenyl phosphate, Triethyl phosphate, 2-Ethylhexyl diphenyl phosphate), PFAS (e.g., PFOA, PFOS, 6:5 FTOS) used as oil- and water repellant coating, synthetic phenolic antioxidants (e.g., butylated hydroxyanisole, tert-butylhydroquinone, butylated hydroxytoluene), and UV stabilizers. Typical non-intentionally added substances include oligomers, degradation products of antioxidants, and primary aromatic amines.

== See also ==
- Disposable food packaging
  - Disposable cup
- List of food labeling regulations
- Packaging and labeling
- Aluminium-free
- Bisphenol-free (regarding BPA, BPF, BPS)
- Lead-free
