= Chlorethoxyfos =

Names
- IUPAC name Diethoxy-sulfanylidene-(1,2,2,2-tetrachloroethoxy)phosphorane
- Preferred IUPAC name O,O-Diethyl O-[1,2,2,2-tetrachloroethyl] phosphorothioate

Identifiers
CAS Number	54593-83-8
3D model (JSmol)	Interactive image
ChemSpider	82758
ECHA InfoCard	100.107.308
KEGG	C18677
PubChem CID	91655
UNII	1H22CUD2KR
CompTox Dashboard (EPA)	DTXSID2032344
- InChI: InChI=1/C6H11Cl4O3PS/c1-3-11-14(15,12-4-2)13-5(7)6(8,9)10/h5H,3-4H2,1-2H3 Key: XFDJMIHUAHSGKG-UHFFFAOYAD
- SMILES: ClC(OP(=S)(OCC)OCC)C(Cl)(Cl)Cl

Properties
Chemical formula	C_{6}H_{11}Cl_{4}O_{3}PS
Molar mass	335.985 g/mol
Appearance	colourless liquid
Boiling point	80°C
Solubility in water	0.1 mg/L in water

Hazards
- Occupational safety and health (OHS/OSH)
Main hazards	Toxic
- Except where otherwise noted, data are given for materials in their standard state (at 25 °C [77 °F], 100 kPa). Infobox references

Chlorethoxyfos (O,O-diethyl-O-(1,2,2,2-tetrachloroethyl)phosphorothioate) is an organophosphate acetylcholinesterase inhibitor used as an insecticide. It is registered for the control of corn rootworms, wireworms, cutworms, seed corn maggot, white grubs and symphylans on corn. The insecticide is sold under the trade name Fortress by E.I. du Pont de Nemours & Company.

Annual domestic usage of chlorethoxyfos is estimated to range from 8,500 to 17,800 pounds of active ingredient for approximately 37,000 to 122,000 acres treated. Approximately 1% of all corn acreage is treated.

Chlorethoxyfos has a O-alkyl phosphorothioate type of phosphorus group which makes it similar to compounds such as chlorpyriphos-methyl, coumaphos, diazinon, dichlofenthion, fenitrothion, fenthion, parathion, parathion-methyl, pyrazophos, pyrimiphos-methyl, sulfotep, temephos, and thionazin.

The compound does not have EU regulatory approval for use as an insecticide as it can be harmful for the aquatic environment and is deemed very toxic for humans.

== History ==
Chlorethoxyfos was first registered in the United States in 1995 to use as an insecticide. It was registered only conditionally by the United States Environmental Protection Agency since additional studies were needed to refine the risk assessments of the Agency. The Agency decided to reassess chlorethoxyfos tolerance and to conduct an occupational risk assessment as a condition of registration of the compound. In 1999, the Agency published the revised risk assessment which forms the basis of the decisions on risk management for chlorethoxyfos.

== Mechanism of action ==
The primary target of organophosphorus insecticides, like chlorethoxyfos, in both insects and mammals is the nervous system, by inhibiting acetylcholinesterase (AChE). The function of acetylcholinesterase is to break down the neurotransmitter acetylcholine which is released at cholinergic nerve endings in response to nervous stimuli. Organophosphorus compounds inhibit acetylcholinesterase by forming a covalent bond between the compound and the active site of AChE. By inhibiting acetylcholinesterase, acetylcholine accumulates in the synaptic cleft, reaching toxic levels. Loss of AChE activity leads to excessive nervous stimulation, which results in neuromuscular paralysis and may even cause respiratory failure. The organophosphorus compound is really stable and hydrolysis from the active site is very slow, leading to long-term toxic effects.

Organophosphorus insecticides not only have an adverse effect on the nervous system, they also affect other processes in the body. Recent studies show that organophosphorus insecticides inhibit enzymes which take part in xenobiotic metabolism, for example carboxylases and CYP enzymes, and enzymes that play a role in cell signaling, like lipases.

== Metabolism ==
Metabolism of organophosphates occurs mostly in the liver, but also in other organs, like the intestine. Before chlorethoxyfos can act as an inhibitor, phase I enzymes need to activate the organophosphate. Phase I of metabolism involves oxidation and hydrolysis. By oxidative desulfurization, CYP enzymes replace the sulfur on the phosphorus with an oxygen atom. After oxidation, hydrolysis of the organophosphate by esterases takes places. Detoxification occurs when esterase A cleaves the compound. Besides these processes, in phase I also oxidative removal of the side chains or oxidative cleavage of the leaving group can take place. The products from phase I metabolism are more hydrophilic, making it easier to be conjugated in phase II metabolism. In phase II, only detoxification reactions take place and after these reactions, the compounds are excreted via the urine. The products of metabolism of chlorethoxyfos include dichloroacetic acid, trichloroacetic acid and trichloroethanol, due to cleavage of the P-O-tetrachloroethoxy bond.

The most important enzymes in metabolism of organophosphorus compounds are CYP1A1, CYP2B6, CYP3A4 and CYP2C19. The first three cytochromes catalyze the oxidative desulfuration, while CYP2C19 is important for the oxidative cleavage of the leaving group and detoxification.

When radioactively labelled chlorethoxyfos was orally administered to mice and rats, it was rapidly eliminated. Seven days after exposure, most of the radioactive dose was recovered in the urine and in the feces.

== Synthesis ==
Chlorethoxyfos can be synthesized from chloral and phosphorus pentachloride. Phosphorus chloride is added to the chloral via an addition reaction. The double bond of chloral (with which the oxygen is bound) becomes a single bond. Because of the now arising negative point charge on the oxygen, the phosphorus pentachloride can bind, hereby losing one chloride. The carbon to which the oxygen is bound now gets a positive charge, to which a Cl can bind. The intermediate that now appeared reacts with hydrogen sulfide in order to form the next intermediate. Two chlorides are replaced by a double bonded sulfur. Now ethanol has to be added to substitute the chlorides that are still bound to the phosphorus atom. This happens via a substitution mechanism, resulting in chlorethoxyfos.

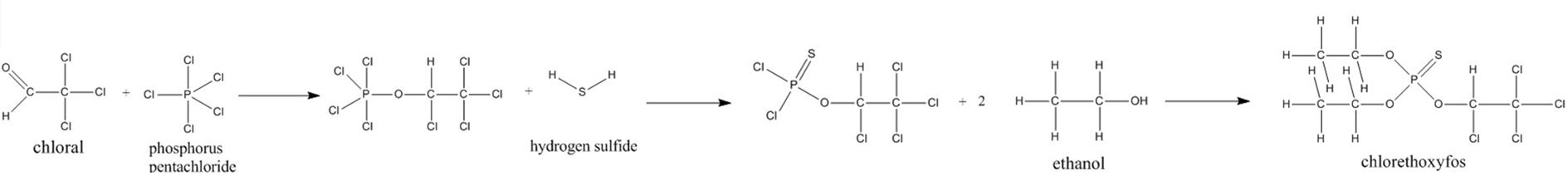
Chlorethoxyfos synthesis from chloral and phosphorus pentachloride

== Efficacy and effects ==
Insecticides like chlorethoxyfos are designed as lethal agents. Chlorethoxyfos is designed to be less toxic for humans than for insects, but it does present a toxic hazard to some extent. It is unstable in aquatic environments and accidental extraction of chlorethoxyfos into aquatic environments may result in exertion of toxic effects on aquatic organisms before degradation is complete.

=== Ecotoxicology ===
Property		Value	Source/Quality Score/Other Information	Interpretation
Bio-concentration factor	BCF	2500 (l kg^{−1})	Q2	Threshold for concern
Bio-concentration factor	CT_{50} (days)	Not available	Q2	-
Mammals - Acute oral LD_{50}		1.8 (mg kg^{−1})	F4 Rat	High
Mammals - Short term dietary NOEL		25 (mg kg^{−1})	Q2 Rat	High
Birds - Acute LD_{50}		486 (mg kg^{−1})	F5 Colinus virginianus	Moderate
Fish - Acute 96 hour LC_{50}		0.089 (mg l^{−1})	J4 Oncorhynchus mykiss	High
Aquatic invertebrates - Acute 48 hour EC_{50}		0.00041 (mg l^{−1})	L3 Daphnia magna	High
Aquatic crustaceans - Acute 96 hour LC_{50}		0.000054 (mg l^{−1})	F3 Americamysis bahia	High
Honeybees	Contact acute 48 hour LD_{50}	0.04 (μg bee^{−1})	F5	High
Earthworms - Acute 14 day LC_{50}		0.39 (mg kg^{−1})	F5	High

=== Effects on animals ===
==== Effects on the nervous system ====
Chlorethoxyfos poisoning includes behavioral changes in relation to inhibition of AChE. Since chlorethoxyfos is an organophosphorus compound it is an irreversible acetylcholinesterase inhibitor. The main effect of chlorethoxyfos is the irreversible phosphorylation of esterases in the central nervous system. This phosphorylation leads to accumulation of ACh in the synaptic cleft and this results in overstimulation of nicotinic and muscarinic ACh receptors.

The impairment related to these effects is called organophosphorus induced delayed neuropathy.

The toxicity of chlorethoxyfos mainly poses risks to workers employed in the application of this pesticide. Pesticides like chlorethoxyfos can be absorbed by various types of routes, like inhalation, ingestion, and dermal absorption. Repeated or prolonged exposure to chlorethoxyfos may result in the same effects as acute exposure. The effects include impaired memory and concentration, disorientation, severe depressions, irritability, confusion, headache, speech difficulties, delayed reaction times, nightmares, sleepwalking and drowsiness or insomnia.

==== Nonspecific toxic effects ====
Next to chlorethoxyfos exerting its main effects with the irreversible inhibition of AChE, it is suggested that both acute and chronic intoxication by chlorethoxyfos seem to disturb the redox processes. Hereby changing the activities of antioxidative enzymes and causing enhancement of lipid peroxidation in many organs. In most of the acute cases of exposition, induction of oxidative stress is one of the main toxic effects. Thereby it may cause many human body disorders by affecting liver, kidney, muscles, immune, and hematological system.

The attack of reactive oxygen species by chlorethoxyfos causes attack of lipids, proteins, and DNA which leads to oxidation and membrane damage, enzyme inactivation, DNA damage and cell death. Damage of the DNA leads to genomic instability which may cause mutagenesis and carcinogenesis.

Next to the use as pesticide, organophosphorus compounds like chlorethoxyfos may be used in the therapy of neurological damages such as AD and Parkinson's disease.

==== Mammalian toxicology ====
Property		Value	Source
Threshold of Toxicological Concern (Cramer Class)		High (class III)	-
Mammals - Acute oral LD_{50}		1.8 (mg kg^{−1})	F4 Rat
Mammals - Dermal LD_{50}		> 20 (mg kg^{−1} body weight)	F3 Rat
Mammals - Inhalation LC_{50}		0.58 (mg l^{−1})	L3 Rat
Other Mammal toxicity endpoints		> 12.5	F3 Rabbit
Dangerous Substances Directive 76/464		List I	-
Exposure Routes	Public	Dietary risks from food and drinking water are not of concern	
Exposure Routes	Occupational	PPE/PPC required to mitigate exposure risks	

== Toxicity ==
Like other organophosphates, chlorethoxyfos has anticholinesterase activity. This makes it a highly toxic compound with a steep dose-response curve. Cases of mortality at low doses have been observed in animal studies. It is placed in Toxicity Category 1 for acute oral, dermal, inhalation and primary eye and dermal irritation potential.

The World Health Organization classifies chlorethoxyfos as a class 1a, extremely hazardous.

According to the United States Environmental Protection Agency, there is no evidence for carcinogenicity of chloroethoxyfos. Therefore, it is classified as a Group D chemical: ‘not classifiable as to human carcinogenicity’.

== Symptoms ==
Different routes of exposure can give rise to different symptoms:

Exposure route	Symptoms
Inhalation	Dizziness; Nausea; Sweating; Muscle twitching; Pupillary constriction; Muscle cramp; Excessive salivation; Laboured breathing; Convulsions; Unconsciousness
Skin	May be absorbed, see ‘Inhalation’
Eye	Blurred vision
Ingestion	Abdominal cramps; Diarrhoea; Vomiting; See ‘inhalation’

== Treatment ==
In case of any kind of organophosphorus poisoning, the situation should be dealt with as an emergency and the patient should quickly be sent to the hospital. Some symptoms may develop rapidly, but there is a delay in the increase of severity up to 48 hours after poisoning. All treatments are based on minimizing the absorption, a general supportive treatment like artificial respiration, and specific pharmacological treatment such as frequent dosing of atropine or pralidoxime and diazepam.

Treatment of chlorethoxyfos intoxication should consist of injection of atropine sulfate. Atropine is a competitive, reversible antagonist of the muscarinic acetylcholine receptors. Injections should be intramuscular and should be administered every 10 minutes until the patient is in a full atropinized state. This atropinized state is characterized by dilated pupils, dry flushed skin and increased heart rate. Whenever symptoms of chlorethoxyfos start to reappear, atropine should be injected again. The atropinized state of the patient should always be maintained. Dosage of atropine is different among different age-groups. Children and infants have a maximum dosage of 0.05 mg/kg. When adults are severely intoxicated the dose can go up to 4 mg. In mild cases 1 or 2 mg will be required. In total, during the first 24 hours 20 or 30 mg might be required.

Next to atropine, chlorethoxyfos intoxication can be treated with pralidoxime chloride, also known as 2-PAM chloride. 2-PAM may be used as an effective antidote in addition to atropine to maintain the patient in atropinized state. The compound pralidoxime is administered to regenerate the acetylcholinesterase. The compound must be administered quickly after the poisoning, because if the phosphorylated enzyme is allowed to age, then it will no longer be an effective antidote. Children and infants have a maximum dosage of 20 to 50 mg/kg. For adults an initial dose of 1 gram should be injected. This 1 gram of 2-PAM is preferably injected as an infusion of 250 cc of saline over a 15- to 30-minute time period. As an alternative, 2-PAM may be injected slowly by intravenous injection as a 5% solution in a minimum time-period of two minutes. After an hour, if muscle weakness has not been relieved, a second dose of 1 gram should be administered.

Other than atropine and pralidoxime, Diazepam should be used when treating severe cases of chlorethoxyfos intoxication. Diazepam is mostly used to relief anxiety, but next to this it counteracts some of the central nervous system-derived symptoms that atropine does not affect. A dose of 10 mg should be administered through intravenous injection. When required, injection of diazepam may be repeated.

Since chlorethoxyfos is a lipophilic compound it might be stored in fat depots and released from it over a period of many days. To prevent any later symptoms of intoxication, treatment with 2-PAM may carry on for a few more days.

=== First aid ===
Ingestion	Contact a doctor immediately for advice on treatment. Vomiting should not be induced unless advised otherwise by a doctor. If able to swallow, let the person sip a glass of water. A slurry of activated charcoal in water can be used. If unconscious, do not let the person digest anything.
On skin or clothing	Contact a doctor immediately for advice on treatment. If applicable, remove contaminated clothing. Use plenty of water to rinse skin immediately for 15–20 minutes.
Inhalation	Contact a doctor immediately for advice on treatment. Immediately let the person inhale fresh air. In case of the person being unable to breathe give artificial respiration by mouth-to-mouth.
Eyes	Contact a doctor immediately for advice on treatment. Immediately use water to gently rinse the eyes for 15–20 minutes with plenty of water. If applicable, remove contact lenses after the first five minutes of gentle rinsing.
