= TCPP =

TCPP may refer to:

- Tris(2-chloroethyl) phosphate
- Tris(chloropropyl) phosphate
- Trade Cooperation and Promotion Program (TCPP)
