= Tris (disambiguation) =

Tris, or Tris(hydroxymethyl) aminomethane, is an organic compound used in biochemistry and molecular biology as a component of buffer solutions,

Tris or TRIS may also refer to:

== Chemicals ==
- Tris(2-chloroethyl) phosphate, a flame retardant
- Tris(2,3-dibromopropyl) phosphate, a flame retardant
- TRIS (drug) (trisescaline, trescaline), a psychedelic-related compound

== People ==
- Tris Speaker, a baseball player
- Tris Prior, a character in the Divergent book series and its film adaptations

== Other uses ==
- TRIS online, a former bibliographic database created by U.S. Department of Transportation Research Information Services online
- TRIS, the ICAO type designator for the Britten-Norman Trislander
