= C2H6ClO2PS =

The molecular formula C_{2}H_{6}ClO_{2}PS (molar mass: 160.56 g/mol, exact mass: 159.9515 u) may refer to:

- Dimethyl chlorothiophosphate
- Dimethyl phosphorochloridothioate
