= Bisphenol-A bis(diphenyl phosphate) =

Names
- Other names: Tetraphenyl (propane-2,2-diylbis(4,1-phenylene)) bis(phosphate); (1-methylethylidene)di-4,1-phenylenetetraphenyl diphosphate

Identifiers
| CAS Number | 5945-33-5 |
| 3D model (JSmol) | Interactive image |
| ChemSpider | 8050514 |
| EC Number | 425-220-8 |
| PubChem CID | 9874825 |
| CompTox Dashboard (EPA) | DTXSID8052720 |
- InChI: Key: BQPNUOYXSVUVMY-UHFFFAOYSA-N; InChI=1S/C39H34O8P2/c1-39(2,31-23-27-37(28-24-31)46-48(40,42-33-15-7-3-8-16-33)43-34-17-9-4-10-18-34)32-25-29-38(30-26-32)47-49(41,44-35-19-11-5-12-20-35)45-36-21-13-6-14-22-36/h3-30H,1-2H3
- SMILES: CC(C)(C1=CC=C(C=C1)OP(=O)(OC2=CC=CC=C2)OC3=CC=CC=C3)C4=CC=C(C=C4)OP(=O)(OC5=CC=CC=C5)OC6=CC=CC=C6

Properties
| Chemical formula | C_{39}H_{34}O_{8}P_{2} |
| Molar mass | 692.641 g·mol^{−1} |
- Except where otherwise noted, data are given for materials in their standard state (at 25 °C [77 °F], 100 kPa). Infobox references

Bisphenol A diphenyl phosphate is a halogen-free flame retardant used in plastics. It is used in polymer blends of engineering plastics, such as PPO/HIPS and PC/ABS, which are commonly used to make casing for electrical items like TVs, computers and home appliances.

It is formed by the transesterification of bisphenol A with triphenyl phosphate. The commercial grade material can contain oligomers (CAS: 181028–79–5)

Oligomers, where n = >1
