= Organophosphate =

Organic compounds with the structure O=P(OR)3

General chemical structure of the organophosphate functional group

In organic chemistry, organophosphates (also known as phosphate esters, or OPEs) are a class of organophosphorus compounds with the general structure O=P(OR)_{3}, a central phosphate molecule with alkyl or aromatic substituents. They can be considered as esters of phosphoric acid. Organophosphates are best known for their use as pesticides.

Like most functional groups, organophosphates occur in a diverse range of forms, with important examples including key biomolecules such as DNA, RNA and ATP, as well as many insecticides, herbicides, nerve agents and flame retardants. OPEs have been widely used in various products as flame retardants, plasticizers, and performance additives to engine oil. The low cost of production and compatibility with diverse polymers allowed OPEs to be widely used in industry including textile, furniture, electronics as plasticizers and flame retardants. These compounds are added to the final product physically rather than by chemical bond. Due to this, OPEs leak into the environment more readily through volatilization, leaching, and abrasion. OPEs have been detected in diverse environmental compartments such as air, dust, water, sediment, soil and biota samples at higher frequency and concentration.

The popularity of OPEs as flame retardants came as a substitution for the highly regulated brominated flame retardants.

== Forms ==
Organophosphates are a class of compounds encompassing a number of distinct but closely related function groups. These are primarily the esters of phosphoric acid and can be mono‑esters, di‑esters or tri‑esters depending on the number of attached organic groups (abbreviated as 'R' in the image below). In general man‑made organophosphates are most often triesters, while biological organophosphates are usually mono- or di-esters. The hydrolysis of triesters can form diesters and monoesters.

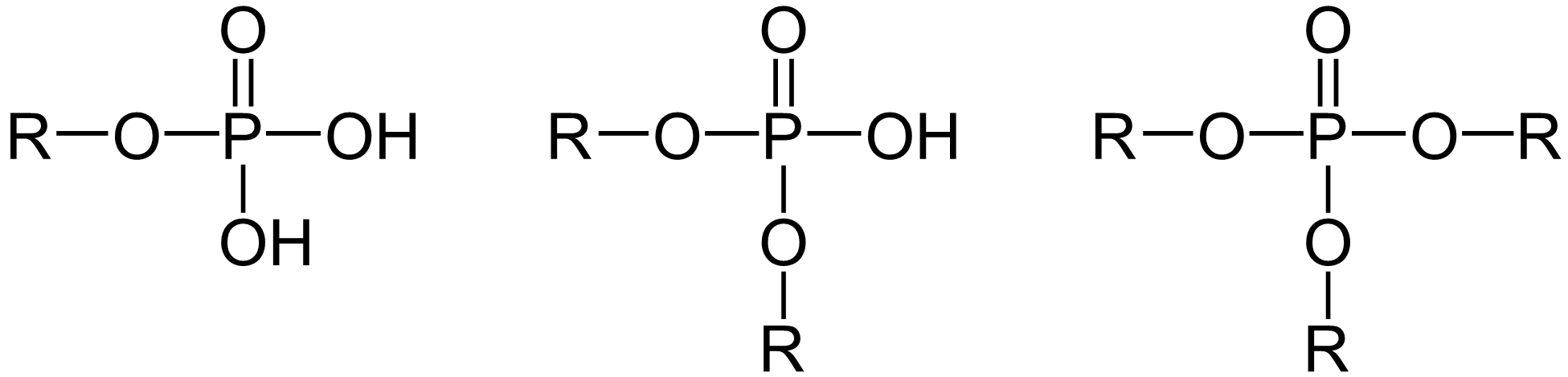

In the context of pesticides, derivatives of organophosphates such as organothiophosphates (P=S) or phosphorodiamidates (P-N) are included as being organophosphates. The reason is that these compound are converted into organophosphates biologically.

In biology the esters of diphosphoric acid and triphosphoric acid are generally included as organophosphates. The reason is again a practical one, as many cellular processes involve the mono-, di- and tri- phosphates of the same compound. For instance, the phosphates of adenosine (AMP, ADP, ATP) play a key role in many metabolic processes.

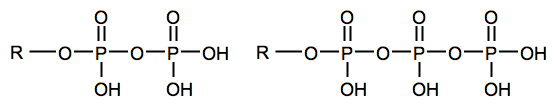

== Synthesis ==
=== Alcoholysis of POCl_{3} ===
Phosphorus oxychloride reacts readily with alcohols to give organophosphates. This is the dominant industrial route and is responsible for almost all organophosphate production. Aluminum trichloride or magnesium chloride are often employed as catalysts.

O=PCl_{3} + 3 ROH → O=P(OR)_{3} + 3 HCl

When aliphatic alcohols are used the HCl by-product can react with the phosphate esters to give organochlorides and a lower ester.

O=P(OR)_{3} + HCl → O=P(OR)_{2}OH + RCl

This reaction is usually undesirable and is exacerbated by high reaction temperatures. It can be inhibited by the use of a base or the removal of HCl through sparging.

=== Esterification of phosphoric acid and P_{2}O_{5} ===
Esterifications of phosphoric acid with alcohols proceed less readily than the more common carboxylic acid esterifications, with the reactions rarely proceeding much further than the phosphate mono-ester. The reaction requires high temperatures, under which the phosphoric acid can dehydrate to form poly-phosphoric acids. These are exceedingly viscous and their linear polymeric structure renders them less reactive than phosphoric acid. Despite these limitations the reaction does see industrial use for the formation of monoalkyl phosphates, which are used as surfactants. A major appeal of this route is the low cost of phosphoric acid compared to phosphorus oxychloride.

OP(OH)_{3} + ROH → OP(OH)_{2}(OR) + H_{2}O

P_{2}O_{5} is the anhydride of phosphoric acid and acts similarly. The reaction yields equimolar amounts of di- and monoesters with no phosphoric acid. The process is mostly limited to primary alcohols, as secondary alcohols are prone to undesirable side reactions such as dehydration.

=== Oxidation of phosphite esters ===
Organophosphites can be easily oxidised to give organophosphates. This is not a common industrial route, however large quantities of organophosphites are manufactured as antioxidant stabilisers for plastics. The gradual oxidation of these generates organophosphates in the human environment.

P(OR)_{3} + [O] → OP(OR)_{3}

=== Phosphorylation ===
The formation of organophosphates is an important part of biochemistry and living systems achieve this using a variety of enzymes. Phosphorylation is essential to the processes of both anaerobic and aerobic respiration, which involve the production of adenosine triphosphate (ATP), the "high-energy" exchange medium in the cell. Protein phosphorylation is the most abundant post-translational modification in eukaryotes. Many enzymes and receptors are switched "on" or "off" by phosphorylation and dephosphorylation.

=== Laboratory methods ===
Various specialised methods have been developed on the laboratory-scale for scientific investigations. These are rarely employed in bulk manufacturing. Examples include the Atherton-Todd reaction, which converts a dialkyl phosphite to a phosphoryl chloride. This can then react with an alcohol to give an organophosphate and HCl.

== Properties ==
=== Bonding ===
The bonding in organophosphates has been a matter of prolonged debate; the phosphorus atom is classically hypervalent, as it possesses more bonds than the octet rule should allow. The focus of debate is usually on the nature of the phosphoryl P=O bond, which displays (in spite of the common depiction) non-classical bonding, with a bond order somewhere between 1 and 2. Early papers explained the hypervalence in terms of d-orbital hybridisation, with the energy penalty of promoting electrons into the higher energy orbitals being off-set by the stabilisation of additional bonding. Later advances in computational chemistry showed that d-orbitals played little significant role in bonding. Current models rely on either negative hyperconjugation, or a more complex arrangement with a dative-type bond from P to O, combined with back-donation from an oxygen 2p orbital. These models agree with the experimental observations of the phosphoryl as being shorter than P-OR bonds and much more polarised. It has been argued that a more accurate depiction is dipolar (i.e. (RO)_{3}P^{+}-O^{−}), which is similar to the depiction of phosphorus ylides such as methylenetriphenylphosphorane. However, in contrast to ylides, the phosphoryl group is unreactive and organophosphates are poor nucleophiles, despite the high concentration of charge on the phosphoryl oxygen. The polarisation accounts in part for the higher melting points of phosphates when compared to their corresponding phosphites. Bonding in the structurally related iminophosphoranes (R_{3}P=NR') has also been long debated, however the penta-coordinate phosphoranes (P(OR)_{5}) are entirely different and involve three-center four-electron bonds.

=== Acidity ===
Phosphate esters bearing P-OH groups are acidic. The pKa of the first OH group is typically between 1-2, while the second OH deprotonates at a pKa between 6-7. As such, phosphate mono- and di-esters are negatively charged at physiological pH. This is of great practical importance, as it makes these compounds far more resistant to degradation by hydrolysis or other forms of nucleophilic attack, due to electrostatic repulsion between negative charges. This effects nearly all organophosphate biomolecules, such as DNA and RNA and accounts in-part for their high stability. The presence of this negative charge also makes these compounds much more water-soluble.

=== Water solubility ===
The water solubility of organophosphates is an important characteristic in biological, industrial and environmental settings. The wide variety of substitutes used in organophosphate esters results in great variations in physical properties. OPEs exhibit a wide range of octanol/water partition coefficients where log Kow values range from -0.98 up to 10.6. Mono- and di- esters are usually water-soluble, particularity biomolecules. Tri-esters such as flame retardants and plasticisers have positive log Kow values ranging between 1.44 and 9.49, signifying hydrophobicity. Hydrophobic OPEs are more likely to be bioaccumulated and biomagnified in aquatic ecosystems. Halogenated organophosphates tend to be denser than water and sink, causing them to accumulate in sediments.

== Industrial materials ==
=== Pesticides ===
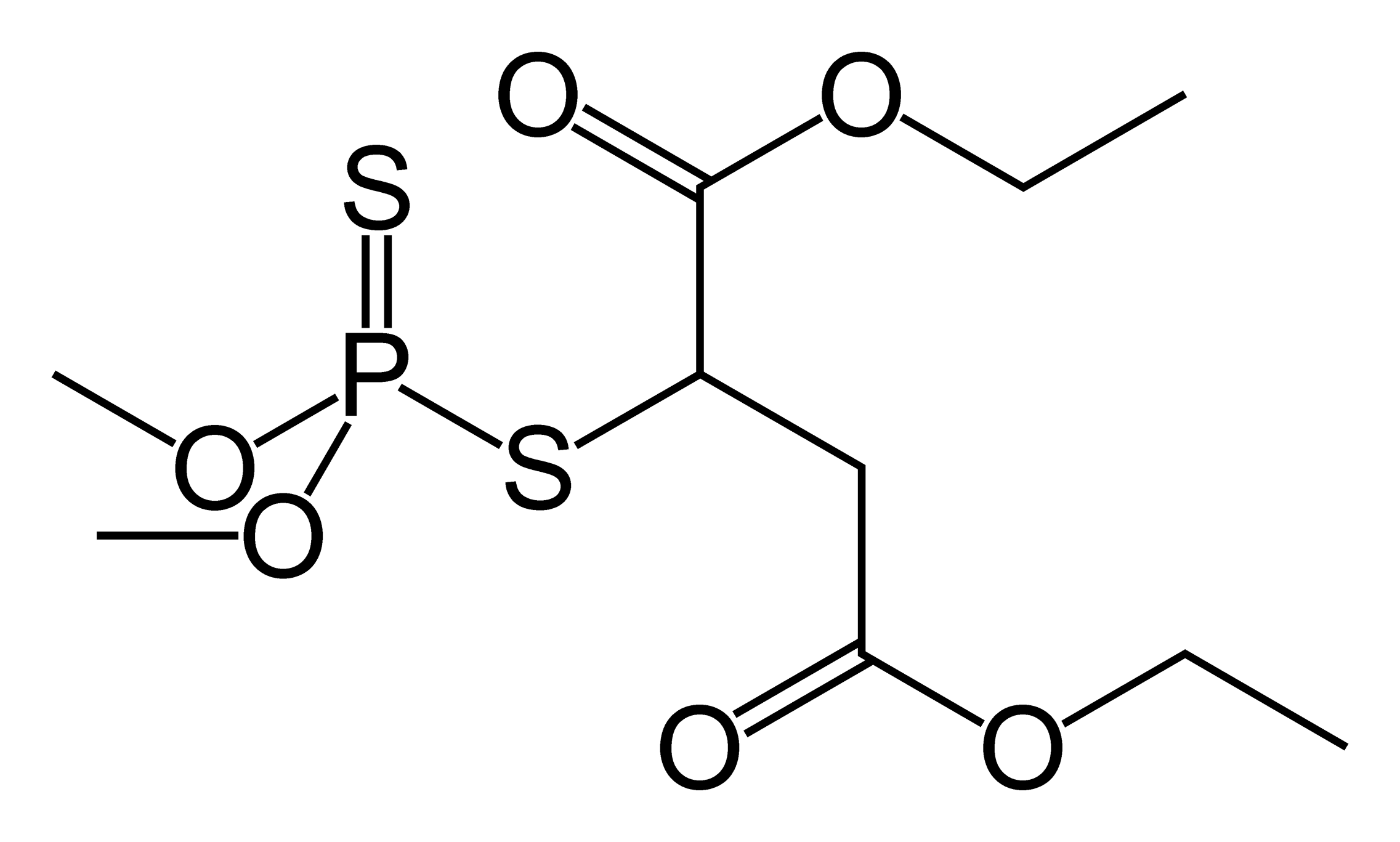
Malathion, one of the first organophosphate insecticides. It remains important as a Vector control agent.

Organophosphates are best known for their use as pesticides. The vast majority are insecticides and are used either to protect crops, or as vector control agents to reduce the transmission of diseases spread by insects, such as mosquitoes. Health concerns have seen their use significantly decrease since the turn of the century. Glyphosate is sometimes called an organophosphate, but is in-fact a phosphonate. Its chemistry, mechanism of toxicity and end-use as a herbicide are different from the organophosphate insecticides.

The development of organophosphate insecticides dates back to the 1930s and is generally credited to Gerhard Schrader. At the time, pesticides were largely limited to arsenic salts (calcium arsenate, lead arsenate and Paris green) or pyrethrin plant extracts, all of which had major problems. Schrader was seeking more effective agents, however while some organophosphates were found to be far more dangerous to insects than higher animals, the potential effectiveness of others as chemical weapons did not go unnoticed. The development of organophosphate insecticides and the earliest nerve agents was conjoined, with Schrader also developing the nerve agents tabun and sarin. Organophosphate pesticides were not commercialised until after WWII. Parathion was among the first marketed, followed by malathion and azinphosmethyl. Although organophosphates were used in considerable quantities, they were originally less important than organochlorine insecticides such as DDT, dieldrin, and heptachlor. When many of the organochlorines were banned in the 1970s, following the publishing of Silent Spring, organophosphates became the most important class of insecticides globally. Nearly 100 were commercialised, with the following being a varied selection:

- Acephate
- Azinphos-methyl
- Bensulide
- Chlorethoxyfos
- Coumaphos
- Diazinon
- Dichlorvos
- Dicrotophos
- Dimethoate
- Disulfoton
- Ethion
- Ethoprop
- Ethyl parathion
- Fenamiphos
- Fenitrothion
- Fonofos
- Isoxathion
- Malathion
- Methamidophos
- Methidathion
- Mevinphos
- Naled
- Phosmet
- Profenofos
- Propetamphos
- Quinalphos
- Sulfotep
- Tebupirimfos
- Temephos
- Terbufos
- Tetrachlorvinphos
- Triazofos

Organophosphate insecticides are acetylcholinesterase inhibitors, which disrupt the transmission of nerve signals in exposed organisms, with fatal results. The risk of human death through organophosphate poisoning was obvious from the start and led to efforts to lower toxicity against mammals while not reducing efficacy against insects.

The majority of organophosphate insecticides are organothiophosphates (P=S) or phosphorodiamidates (P-N), both of which are significantly weaker acetylcholinesterase inhibitors than the corresponding phosphates (P=O). They are 'activated' biologically by the exposed organism, via oxidative conversion of P=S to P=O, hydroxylation, or other related process which see them transformed into organophosphates. In mammals, these transformations occur almost exclusively in the liver, while in insects, they take place in the gut and fat body. As the transformations are handled by different enzymes in different classes of organism, it is possible to find compounds which activate more rapidly and completely in insects, and thus display more targeted lethal action.

This selectivity is far from perfect and organophosphate insecticides remain acutely toxic to humans, with many thousands estimated to be killed each year due to intentional (suicide) or unintentional poisoning. Beyond their acute toxicity, long-term exposure to organophosphates is associated with a number of heath risks, including organophosphate-induced delayed neuropathy (muscle weakness) and developmental neurotoxicity. There is limited evidence that certain compounds cause cancer, including malathion and diazinon. Children and farmworkers are considered to be at greater risk.

Pesticide regulation in the United States and the regulation of pesticides in the European Union have both been increasing restrictions on organophosphate pesticides since the 1990s, particularly when used for crop protection. The use of organophosphates has decreased considerably since that time, having been replaced by pyrethroids and neonicotinoids, which are effective at much lower levels. Reported cases of organophosphate poisoning in the US have reduced during this period. Regulation in the global south can be less extensive.

In 2015, only 3 of the 50 most common crop-specific pesticides used in the US were organophosphates (Chlorpyrifos, Bensulide, Acephate). No new organophosphate pesticides have been commercialised in the 21st century. The situation in vector control is fairly similar, despite different risk trade-offs, with the global use of organophosphate insecticides falling by nearly half between 2010 and 2019. Even so, Pirimiphos-methyl, Malathion and Temefos are still important, primarily for the control of malaria in the Asia-Pacific region. The continued use of these agents is being challenged by the emergence of insecticide resistance.

=== Flame retardants ===
Bisphenol A diphenyl phosphate, a common organophosphate flame retardant

Flame retardants are added to materials to prevent combustion and to delay the spread of fire after ignition. Organophosphate flame retardants are part of a wider family of phosphorus-based agents which include organic phosphonate and phosphinate esters, in addition to inorganic salts. When some prominent brominated flame retardant were banned in the early 2000s, phosphorus-based agents were promoted as safer replacements. This has led to a large increase in their use, with an estimated 1 million tonnes of organophosphate flame retardants produced in 2018. Safety concerns have subsequently been raised about some of these reagents, with several under regulatory scrutiny.

Organophosphate flame retardants were first developed in the first half of the twentieth century in the form of triphenyl phosphate, tricresyl phosphate and tributyl phosphate for use in plastics like cellulose nitrate and cellulose acetate. Use in cellulose products is still significant, but the largest area of application is now in plasticized vinyl polymers, primarily PVC. The more modern organophosphate flame retardants come in 2 major types; chlorinated aliphatic compounds or aromatic diphosphates. The chlorinated compounds TDCPP, TCPP and TCEP are all involatile liquids, of which TCPP is perhaps the most important. They are used in polyurethane (insulation, soft furnishings), PVC (wire and cable) phenolic resins and epoxy resins (varnishes, coatings and adhesives). The most important of the diphosphates is bisphenol-A bis(diphenyl phosphate), with related analogues based around resorcinol and hydroquinone. These are used in polymer blends of engineering plastics, such as PPO/HIPS and PC/ABS, which are commonly used to make casing for electrical items like TVs, computers and home appliances.

Organophosphates act multifunctionally to retard fire in both the gas phase and condensed (solid) phase. Halogenated organophosphates are more active overall as their degradation products interfere with combustion directly in the gas phase. All organophosphates have activity in the condensed phase, by forming phosphorus acids which promote char formation, insulating the surface from heat and air.

Organophosphates were originally thought to be a safe replacements for brominated flame retardants, however many are now coming under regulatory pressure due to their apparent health risks. The chlorinated organophosphates may be carcinogenic, while others such as tricresyl phosphate have necrotoxic properties. Bisphenol-A bis(diphenyl phosphate) can hydrolyse to form Bisphenol-A which is under significant scrutiny as potential endocrine-disrupting chemical. Although their names imply that they are a single chemical, some (but not all) are produced as complex mixtures. For instance, commercial grade TCPP can contain 7 different isomers, while tricresyl phosphate can contain up to 10. This makes their safety profiles harder to ascertain, as material from different producers can have different compositions.

=== Plasticisers ===
2-Ethylhexyl diphenyl phosphate an alkyl diaryl organophosphate used as both a plasticizer and flame retardant in PVC

Plasticisers are added to polymers and plastics to improve their flexibility and processability, leading to a softer and more easily deformable material. In this way brittle polymers can be made more durable. The most frequently plasticised polymers are the vinyls (PVC, PVB, PVA and PVCA), as well as cellulose plastics (cellulose acetate, nitrocellulose and cellulose acetate butyrate). PVC dominates the market, consuming 80-90% of global plasticiser production. PVC can accept large amounts of plasticiser; it is common for products to be 0-50% plasticiser by mass, but loadings can be as high as 70-80% in the case of plastisols.

Pure PVC is more than 60% chlorine by mass and is difficult to burn, but its flammability increases the more it is plasticised. Organophosphates find use because they are multifunctional; primarily plasticising but also imparting flame resistance. Compounds are typically triaryl or alkyl diaryl phosphates, with cresyl diphenyl phosphate and 2-ethylhexyl diphenyl phosphate being important examples respectively. These are both liquids with high boiling points. Organophosphates are more expensive than traditional plasticisers and so tend be used in combination with other plasticisers and flame retardants.

=== Hydraulic fluids and lubricant additives ===
Similar to their use as plastisiers, organophosphates are well suited to use as hydraulic fluids due to their low freezing points and high boiling points, fire-resistance, non-corrosiveness, excellent boundary lubrication properties and good general chemical stability. The triaryl phosphates are the most important group, with tricresyl phosphate being the first to be commercialised in the 1940s, with trixylyl phosphate following shortly after. Butylphenyl diphenyl phosphate and propylphenyl diphenyl phosphate became available after 1960.

In addition to their use as hydraulic base-stock, organophosphates (tricresyl phosphate) and metal organothiophosphates (zinc dithiophosphate) are used as both an antiwear additives and extreme pressure additives in lubricants, where they remain effective even at high temperatures.

=== Metal extractants ===
Organophosphates have long been used in the field of extractive metallurgy to liberate valuable rare earth metals from their ores. Di(2-ethylhexyl)phosphoric acid and tributyl phosphate are used for the liquid–liquid extraction of these elements from the acidic mixtures form by the leaching of mineral deposits. The same compounds are also used in nuclear reprocessing, as part of the PUREX process.

=== Surfactants ===
Mono- and di- phosphate esters of alcohols (or alcohol ethoxylates) act as surfactants (detergents). Although they are very common in biology as phospholipids, their industrial use is largely limited to certain niche areas. Compared to the more common sulfur-based anionic surfactants (such as LAS or SLES), phosphate ester surfactants are more expensive and generate less foam. Benefits include high stability at extremes of pH, low skin irritation and a high tolerance to dissolved salts. In agricultural settings monoesters of fatty alcohol ethoxylates are used, which are able to disperse poorly miscible or insoluble pesticides into water. As they are low-foaming these mixtures can be sprayed effectively onto fields, while a high salt tolerance allows co-spraying of pesticides and inorganic fertilisers. Low-levels of phosphate mono-esters, such as potassium cetyl phosphate, find use in cosmetic creams and lotions. These in oil-in-water formulations are primarily based on non-ionic surfactants, with the anionic phosphate acting as emulsion-stabilisers. Phosphate tri-esters such as tributyl phosphate are used as anti-foaming agents in paints and concrete.

=== Nerve agents ===
Although the first phosphorus compounds observed to act as cholinesterase inhibitors were organophosphates, the vast majority of nerve agents are instead phosphonates containing a P-C bond. Only a handful of organophosphate nerve agents were developed between the 1930s and 1960s, including diisopropylfluorophosphate, VG and NPF. Between 1971 and 1993 the Soviet Union developed many new potential nerve agents, commonly known as the Novichok agents. Some of these can be considered organophosphates (in a broad sense), being derivatives of fluorophosphoric acid. Examples include A-232, A-234, A-262, C01-A035 and C01-A039. The most notable of these is A-234, which was claimed to be responsible for the poisoning of Sergei and Yulia Skripal in Salisbury (UK) 2018.

== In nature ==
The detection of OPEs in the air as far away as Antarctica at concentrations around 1 ng/m^{3} suggests their persistence in air, and their potential for long-range transport. OPEs were measured in high frequency in air and water and widely distributed in northern hemisphere. The chlorinated OPEs (TCEP, TCIPP, TDCIPP) in urban sampling sites and non-halogenated OPEs like TBOEP in rural areas were frequently measured in the environment across multiple sites. In the Laurentian Great Lakes, total OPEs concentrations were found to be 2–3 orders of magnitude higher than concentrations of brominated flame retardants measured in similar air. Waters from rivers in Germany, Austria, and Spain have been consistently recorded for TBOEP and TCIPP at highest concentrations. From these studies, it is clear that OPE concentrations in both air and water samples are often orders of magnitude higher than other flame retardants, and that concentrations are largely dependent on sampling location, with higher concentrations in more urban, polluted locations.
