= Tris(1,3-dichloro-2-propyl)phosphate =

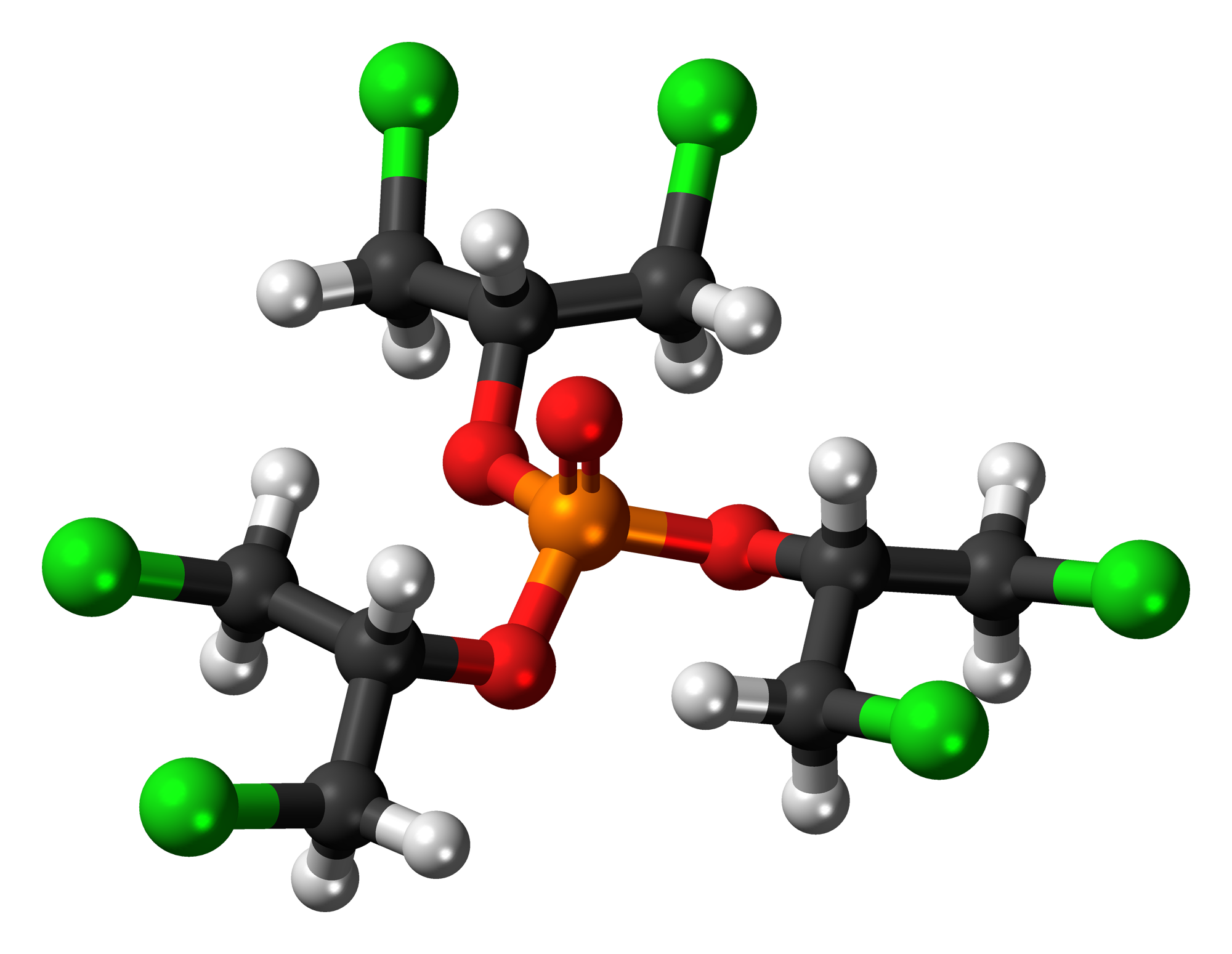

Names
- Preferred IUPAC name Tris(1,3-dichloropropan-2-yl) phosphate
- Other names: Tris; chlorinated tris; tris [2-chloro-1-(chloromethyl ethyl] phosphate; tris (1,3-dichloroisopropyl) phosphate; tris (1,3-dichloro-2-propyl) phosphate; TDCP; TDCPP; TDCIPP; Fyrol FR-2; Antiblaze 195

Identifiers
CAS Number	13674-87-8
3D model (JSmol)	Interactive image
ChEBI	CHEBI:143729
ChEMBL	ChEMBL3182032
ChemSpider	24388
ECHA InfoCard	100.033.767
EC Number	237-159-2
PubChem CID	26177
UNII	B1PRV4G0T0
CompTox Dashboard (EPA)	DTXSID9026261
- InChI: InChI=1S/C9H15Cl6O4P/c10-1-7(2-11)17-20(16,18-8(3-12)4-13)19-9(5-14)6-15/h7-9H,1-6H2 = Key: ASLWPAWFJZFCKF-UHFFFAOYSA-N =
- SMILES: O=P(OC(CCl)CCl)(OC(CCl)CCl)OC(CCl)CCl

Properties
Chemical formula	C_{9}H_{15}Cl_{6}O_{4}P
Molar mass	430.89 g·mol^{−1}
Appearance	Colorless liquid

Hazards
- GHS labelling
Pictograms	(GHS08: Health hazard)
Signal word	Warning
Hazard statements	H351
Precautionary statements	P201, P202, P281, P308+P313, P405, P501
- Except where otherwise noted, data are given for materials in their standard state (at 25 °C [77 °F], 100 kPa). verify (what is ?) Infobox references

Tris(1,3-dichloroisopropyl)phosphate (TDCPP) is a chlorinated organophosphate which used as a flame retardant, particularly in polyurethane foams. It is structurally related to several other flame retardants, such as tris(2-chloroethyl) phosphate (TCEP) and tris(chloropropyl) phosphate (TCPP), which are sometimes sometimes collectively referred to as "chlorinated tris".

TDCPP is facing regulatory pressure; ECHA regards it as a suspected carcinogen and it is under CORAP assessment as part of REACH.

== Manufacture ==
TDCPP is produced by the reaction of epichlorohydrin with phosphorus oxychloride.

== Uses ==
=== Flame retardant ===
Until the late 1970s, TDCPP was used as a flame retardant in children's pajamas in compliance with the U.S. Flammable Fabrics Act of 1953. This use was discontinued after children wearing fabrics treated with a very similar compound, tris(2,3-dibromopropyl) phosphate, were found to have mutagenic byproducts in their urine.

Following the 2005 phase-out of PentaBDE in the United States, TDCPP became one of the primary flame retardants used in flexible polyurethane foam used in a wide variety of consumer products, including automobiles, upholstered furniture, and some baby products. TDCPP can also be used in rigid polyurethane foam boards used for building insulation. In 2011 it was reported that TDCPP was found in about a third of tested baby products.

Some fabrics used in camping equipment are also treated with TDCPP to meet CPAI-84, a standard established by the Industrial Fabrics Association International to evaluate the flame resistance of fabrics and other materials used in tents.

Current total production of TDCPP is not well known. In 1998, 2002, and 2006, production in the United States was estimated to be between 4,500 and 22,700 metric tons, and thus TDCPP is classified as a high production volume chemical.

== Presence in the environment ==
TDCPP is an additive flame retardant, meaning that it is not chemically bonded to treated materials. Additive flame retardants are thought to be more likely to be released into the surrounding environment during the lifetime of the product than chemically bonded, or reactive, flame retardants.

TDCPP degrades slowly in the environment and is not readily removed by waste water treatment processes.

=== Indoors ===
TDCPP has been detected in indoor dust, although concentrations vary widely. A study of house dust in the U.S. found that over 96% of samples collected between 2002 and 2007 contained TDCPP at an average concentration of over 1.8 ppm, while the highest was over 56 ppm. TDCPP was also detected in 99% of dust samples collected in 2009 in the Boston area from offices, homes, and vehicles. The second study found an average concentration similar to that of the previous study but a greater range of concentrations: one sample collected from a vehicle contained over 300 ppm TDCPP in the dust. Similar concentrations have been reported for dust samples collected in Europe and Japan.

TDCPP has also been measured in indoor air samples. Its detection in air samples, however, is less frequent and generally at lower concentrations than other organophosphate flame retardants such as TCEP and TCPP, likely due to its lower vapor pressure.

=== Outdoors ===
Although TDCPP is generally found at the highest concentrations in enclosed environments, such as homes and vehicles, it is widespread in the environment. Diverse environmental samples, ranging from surface water to wildlife tissues, have been found to contain TDCPP. The highest levels of contamination are generally near urban impacted areas; however, samples from even relatively remote reference sites have contained TDCPP.

== Human exposure ==
Humans are thought to be exposed to TDCPP and other flame retardants through several routes, including inhalation, ingestion, and skin contact with treated materials. Rodent studies show that TDCPP is readily absorbed through the skin and gastrointestinal tract. Infants and young children are expected to have the highest exposure to TDCPP and other indoor contaminants for several reasons. Compared to adults, children spend more time indoors and closer to the floor, where they are exposed to higher amounts of dust particles. In addition, they frequently put their hands and other objects into their mouths without washing.

Several studies show that TDCPP can accumulate in human tissues. It has been detected in semen, fat, and breast milk, and the metabolite bis (1,3-dichloropropyl) phosphate (BDCPP) has been detected in urine.

== Health effects ==
=== Acute ===
Organophosphate toxicity is classically associated with acetylcholinesterase inhibition. Acetylcholinesterase is an enzyme responsible for breaking down the neurotransmitter acetylcholine. Many organophosphates, especially those designed to act as nerve agents or pesticides, bind with the active site on acetylcholinesterase, preventing it from breaking down acetylcholine. In rodent studies, TDCPP was found to have very low capacity to inhibit acetylcholinesterase, and it is considered to have low acute toxicity. Animals that were given very high doses (>1 g/kg/day) exhibited clinical signs of organophosphate poisoning, including muscle weakness, loss of coordination, hyperactivity, and death.

=== Chronic ===
==== Cancer ====
Several studies suggest that TDCPP may be carcinogenic. Rodents that were fed TDCPP over two years showed increased tumor formation in the liver and brain. Metabolites of TDCPP were also determined to be mutagenic in bacteria using the Ames test.

In 2011, TDCPP was listed as a carcinogen under California Proposition 65, a law that identifies and regulates chemicals determined by the California Environmental Protection Agency 'to cause cancer, birth defects or other reproductive harm.'

==== Reproduction ====
Men living in homes with high concentrations of TDCPP in house dust were more likely to have decreased sperm counts and increased serum prolactin levels. Women typically have higher concentrations of the hormone prolactin than men do. Release of prolactin is regulated by the neurotransmitter dopamine. Prolactin is important for regulating lactation, sex drive, and other hormones.

==== Development ====
TDCPP and other similar organophosphate flame retardants have been found to disrupt normal development.

Chickens exposed to TDCPP as embryos developed abnormally: Exposure to 45 ug/g resulted in shorter head-to-bill lengths, decreased body weight, and smaller gallbladders, while 7.64 ug/g lowered free thyroxine (T4) levels in the blood.

Similarly, zebrafish raised in water containing TDCPP died or developed severe malformations. When the TDCPP exposure began very early during embryogenesis, by the 2 cell stage, the developing embryos were more severely affected.

TDCPP was found to affect several neurodevelopmental processes in a neuronal cell line. PC12 cells showed decreased cell replication and growth, increased oxidative stress, and altered cellular differentiation. In a developing organism, these effects could change the way the brain cells communicate and function, resulting in permanent changes in nervous system function.

==== Thyroid ====
TDCPP exposure was found to alter mRNA expression of several genes that regulate thyroid function in zebrafish embryos and larvae. Early life exposure also changed thyroid hormone levels in both zebrafish and chick embryos: triiodothyronine (T3) levels increased in exposed zebrafish while thyroxine (T4) levels decreased in both species.

TDCPP may affect brain development and function via the thyroid system. Thyroid hormones are critical for normal growth and development and for proper function in the endocrine system. The developing brain in particular is highly sensitive to thyroid hormone disruptions. Disruptions to the thyroid system of either the mother or the fetus during early brain development are associated with lower IQ scores and increased risk for ADHD or other neurobehavioral disorders.
