= Allan Hay =

Canadian chemist

Allan Stuart Hay
- Born: July 23, 1929; Edmonton, Alberta, Canada
- Died: August 14, 2017 (aged 88); Niskayuna, New York, United States
- Education: University of Alberta; University of Illinois Chicago
- Known for: Polyphenylene Oxide, Noryl
- Scientific career
- Fields: Chemistry
- Workplaces: General Electric; McGill University

Allan Stuart Hay FRS (July 23, 1929 – August 14, 2017) was a Canadian chemist, and Tomlinson Emeritus Professor of Chemistry at McGill University. He is best known for his synthesization of Polyphenylene Oxide, leading to the development of Noryl and various other plastics.

== Career ==
Hay graduated from the University of Alberta with a B.Sc. in 1950 and an M.Sc. in 1952, and from the University of Illinois Chicago with a Ph.D. in 1955.

He was a research chemist, and manager at General Electric, from 1955 to 1988. In 1975, he became adjunct faculty at the University of Massachusetts Amherst.

In 1987, after retiring from GE, he became a research professor of polymer chemistry at McGill University in Montreal, Quebec, Canada. Hay held the GE/NSERC Chair of Polymer Chemistry from 1987 to 1995, and the Tomlinson Chair in Chemistry from 1997 to 2014. He retired from McGill in 2014, returning to Niskayuna, New York.

== Awards and honors ==
In 1981, Hay was named a fellow of the Royal Society of London. In 1984 he received the IRI Achievement Award from the Industrial Research Institute in recognition for his contributions to science and technology, and society generally, for discoveries in polymerization by oxidative coupling. In 1985 he received the Chemical Pioneer Award from the American Institute of Chemists and in 1987 he received an honorary Doctor of Science degree from the University of Alberta.
