= Julie Watts (journalist) =

American journalist

Julie Watts is an American investigative journalist and television correspondent for CBS News California, headquartered in Sacramento. Her investigative reports are broadcast across major CBS markets, including San Francisco, Sacramento, Los Angeles and CBS News platforms.

== Early life and education ==
Watts was born and raised in the San Francisco Bay Area. She attended the University of Southern California, where she earned a Bachelor of Arts in Broadcast Journalism and a Master of Arts in Online Journalism; graduating as the program's Graduate Student of the Year.

== Journalistic career ==
Watts began her career as a traffic anchor, weather anchor and reporter at CBS 47 in Fresno, California. Watts then joined KCRA 3 in Sacramento as a reporter and weather anchor, where she earned meteorology credentials from the American Meteorological Society. In 2009, Watts moved to KPIX, the CBS owned television station in San Francisco, where she served as a news anchor, meteorologist and consumer reporter.

Her ComsumerWatch reports were distributed via CBS NewsPath and aired in CBS stations across the country. During her tenure at KPIX, she anchored the weekend morning news; earned the Associated Press Best News Anchor award.

Watts founded Newsmom.com, an online portal dedicated to consumer and safety research for parents.

In 2019, Watts transferred to the CBS-owned television station Sacramento as an investigative reporter and news anchor, where she developed the network's California Capitol Accountability franchise.

In 2024, Watts launched the statewide government accountability franchise for CBS News, creating CBS News California Investigates.

== Notable investigations ==
=== UN-Covered California ===
In 2014, Watts created UN-Covered California investigative series that looked at issues with California's health insurance exchange during the Affordable Care Act's implementation. Materials submitted to Covered California's board of directors referenced Watts' reporting and the series led to insurer adjustments and state regulatory action.

The National Press Club, which awarded UN-Covered California its Consumer Journalism Award for broadcast reporting, described the investigation as uncovering numerous flaws in California's health insurance exchange and specifically credited the reporting with prompting insurer changes and regulatory action. The series also received a regional Emmy Award for continuing coverage.

=== Toxic safety ===
Watts investigated flame-retardant chemicals in children's car seats and other consumer goods during the course of a multiyear project called Toxic Safety. Despite Orbit Baby's marketing emphasizing the lack of dangerous flame retardants, her reporting in 2015 discovered the flame retardant TDCPP, also known as chlorinated Tris, in car seats sold by the upscale manufacturer. Records from the California Attorney General reveal that Orbit Baby was sued under Proposition 65, which led to a settlement that required product reformulation. The proposed federal legislation addressing flame-retardant chemicals in children's car seats followed the wider Toxic Safety study, which also attracted congressional attention.

The series was recognised with a National Gracie Award, the National Press Club's Consumer Journalism Award, and the Sigma Delta Chi Award for Public Service from the Society of Professional Journalists.

=== Child identity theft and Toddler Has a Credit Card ===
Her investigation Toddler Has a Credit Card, which exposed child identity theft issues, contributed to the passage of a California law in 2016 and earned a National Headliner Award.

Watts' Toddler Has a Credit Card investigation examined child identity theft and barriers preventing parents from proactively protecting their children's credit. The reporting grew out of Watts' attempts to freeze her own young child's credit, which exposed a gap in California law: credit bureaus were not required to create and freeze a credit record for a minor who had not already become a victim of identity theft. After reading Watts' reporting, California Assemblyman Mike Gatto introduced AB 1580 with Assemblywoman Jacqui Irwin to establish a legal process allowing parents and guardians to freeze the credit of children under 16. The legislation required credit reporting agencies to create a record for a child when necessary to place the freeze and was signed into law by Gov. Jerry Brown in 2016. Toddler Has a Credit Card later received first place for business and consumer reporting in the National Headliner Awards.

=== Newborn DNA and genetic privacy ===
Watts conducted an investigation into California's collection, retention and use of blood samples that were obtained through the state's newborn screening program.

In 2015, the reporting examined the state's storage of newborn blood spots. Their use by outside researchers and law enforcement and questions surrounding parental consent and genetic privacy.

In 2024, Governor Gavin Newsom signed a legislation new requirements by governing the state's storage and use of newborn blood samples.

=== State-Sponsored identity theft ===
In 2015, the five-year investigation that began at KPIX and continued after Watts transferred to the CBS-owned station in Sacramento, KOVR, exposed Employment Development Department practices that placed millions of Californians at risk of identity theft. The reporting led to a joint legislative hearing, a state audit, and new legislation. The initial reports prompted members of the California Assembly Privacy and Consumer Protection Committee to demand changes from EDD. Mike Gatto cited Watts' reporting while pressing the agency to stop the practice.

The California State Auditor's 2019 report confirmed that EDD had mailed more than 17 million pieces of mail containing full Social Security numbers in a single fiscal year and concluded that the practice put Californians at risk of identity theft.

Assembly member Chad Mayes subsequently introduced AB 499. The legislation prohibited state agencies from mailing documents containing full Social Security numbers, subject to limited exceptions, and required agencies to develop plans to phase out the practice. Governor Gavin Newsom signed AB 499 into law in September 2020. EDD later reported to the Legislature that it was implementing the law and removing Social Security numbers from affected forms.

The investigation won numerous journalism awards.

=== COVID lab investigation ===
Beginning in 2021, Watts led a whistleblower-driven investigation into California's state-contracted COVID-19 testing laboratory, operated by PerkinElmer under a no-bid contract that eventually grew to $1.7 billion. State regulators opened an investigation following the initial whistleblower report, while the Centers for Medicare and Medicaid Services conducted a separate federal investigation. Subsequent inspections identified significant deficiencies at the laboratory.

The investigation also prompted three California legislative proposals addressing issues raised by the reporting. While SCA 7 advocated demanding legislative approval prior to the renewal of big no-bid state contracts, SB 947 aimed to expand whistleblower protections to employees of private corporations holding significant state contracts.

The Legislators introduced SB 1271, which demanded more legislative scrutiny before state agencies could continue or renew some significant no-bid contracts, after SCA 7 stalled. In 2022, SB 1271 became a law. California subsequently terminated its $1.7 billion contract with PerkinElmer.

The COVID Lab: State Secrets Exposed received the National Press Club's Consumer Journalism Award for broadcast reporting in addition to other awards.

=== Digital democracy and legislative accountability ===
In 2024 and 2025, Watts collaborated with CalMatters' Digital Democracy team on data-driven investigations of the California State Legislature. Using Digital Democracy's database of legislative hearings, campaign contributions and more than one million votes, Watts and CalMatters reporter Ryan Sabalow examined how bills can be defeated without lawmakers formally voting against them. Their analysis found that Democratic legislators, who hold supermajorities in both chambers, voted "no" less than 1% of the time and that bills could instead fail when lawmakers declined to vote. Watts' television reporting examined the practice through the experiences of parents advocating for fentanyl legislation whose bills died without recorded "no" votes.

The collaboration received the 2025 Punch Sulzberger Prize for Journalism Innovation from the Poynter Institute. The reporting also received a Golden State Journalism Award for television enterprise reporting, a Regional Edward R. Murrow Award for News Series and a Northern California Emmy Award for politics and government reporting.

=== 2026 California gubernatorial election coverage ===
During the 2026 California gubernatorial campaign, Watts conducted a series of extended accountability interviews with leading candidates for CBS News California Investigates. She later served as a moderator of the 2026 gubernatorial debate at Pomona College featuring eight candidates.

The interview with former U.S. Representative Katie Porter in 2025 drew national attention when Porter grew frustrated with repeated questions about whether she would need support from Californians who had voted for Donald Trump.

The exchange was covered by national and California news organizations, including Politico, the Los Angeles Times and USA Today, and became a problem during the gubernatorial campaign.
