= Trixylyl phosphate =

Names
- Other names: tris(dimethylphenyl) phosphate; Tri-dimethyl phenyl phosphate; Tri-xylenyl phosphate

Identifiers
CAS Number	25155-23-1
ECHA InfoCard	100.042.419
EC Number	246-677-8
UNII	7M08K25Q1J
CompTox Dashboard (EPA)	DTXSID9026267

Properties
Chemical formula	C_{24}H_{27}O_{4}P
Molar mass	410.450 g·mol^{−1}
Appearance	Viscous liquid
Density	1.142
Melting point	−20 °C (−4 °F; 253 K)
Boiling point	394 °C (741 °F; 667 K)
Solubility in water	20 µg/L

Hazards
- GHS labelling
Pictograms	(GHS08: Health hazard)
Signal word	Danger
Hazard statements	H360F
- Except where otherwise noted, data are given for materials in their standard state (at 25 °C [77 °F], 100 kPa). Infobox references

Trixylyl phosphate (TXP) is an aromatic phosphate ester. It was historically used as a flame retardant for acetate plastics (cellulose nitrate and cellulose acetate) and PVC. It also saw significant use as a fire-resistant hydraulic fluid.

Trixylyl phosphate is now banned or restricted in several jurisdictions, due to its poor safety profile. Short term exposure can cause organophosphate-induced delayed neuropathy, but it is also regarded as a reproductive toxin. In the EU is classified as a substance of very high concern, requiring authorisation to be used.

== Synthesis ==
Trixylyl phosphate is prepared industrially by the reaction of phosphoryl chloride with mixed xylenols. In practise this produces a range of isomers.

== See also ==
- Tricresyl phosphate - chemically analogous with similar applications and toxicity
