= Bensulide =

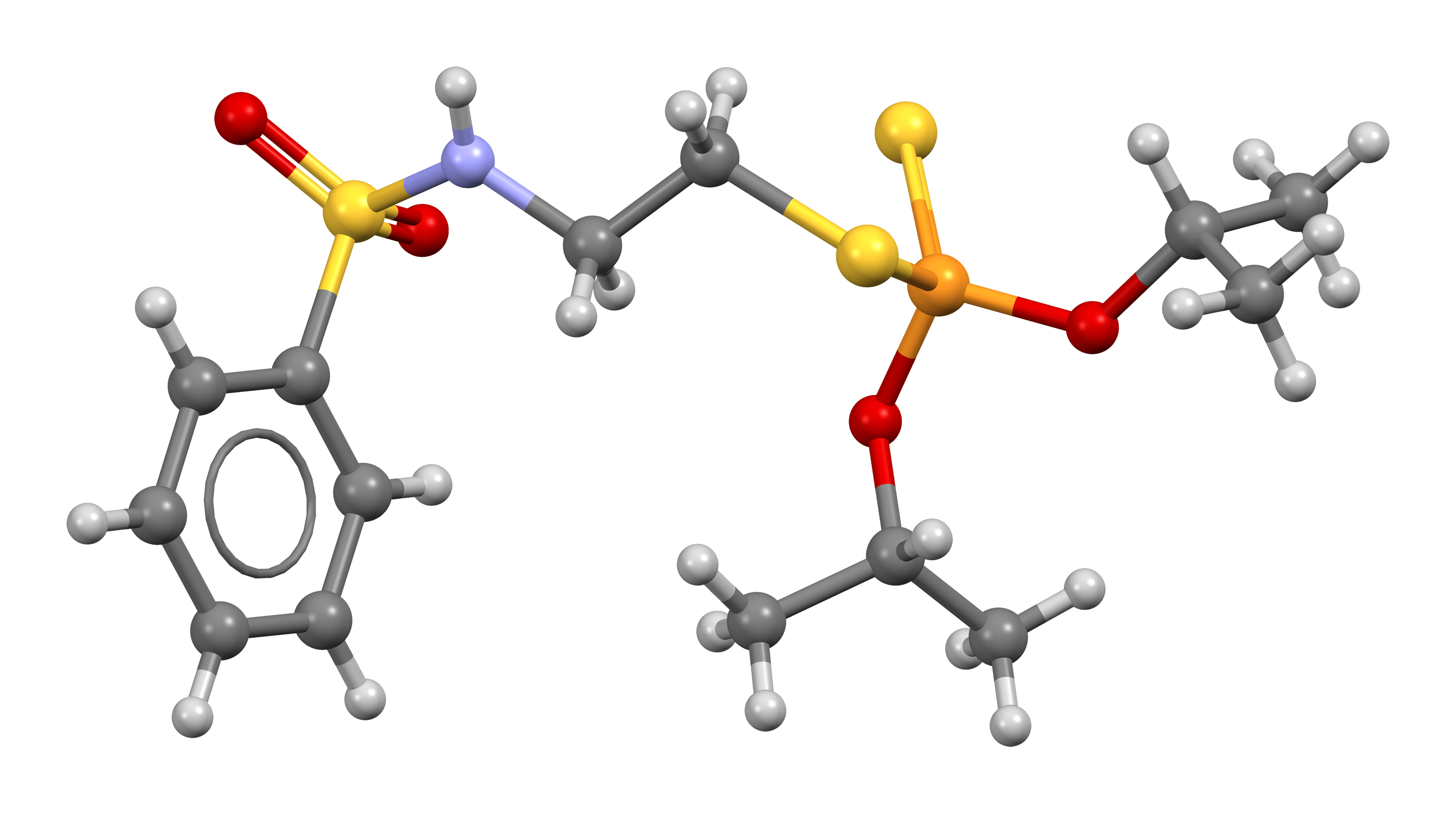

Names
- Preferred IUPAC name S-[2-(Benzenesulfonamido)ethyl] O,O-di(propan-2-yl) phosphorodithioate

Identifiers
CAS Number	741-58-2
3D model (JSmol)	Interactive image
ChemSpider	12397
ECHA InfoCard	100.010.919
KEGG	C18703
PubChem CID	12932
UNII	9882BW2Q2S
CompTox Dashboard (EPA)	DTXSID9032329
- InChI: InChI=1S/C14H24NO4PS3/c1-12(2)18-20(21,19-13(3)4)22-11-10-15-23(16,17)14-8-6-5-7-9-14/h5-9,12-13,15H,10-11H2,1-4H3 Key: RRNIZKPFKNDSRS-UHFFFAOYSA-N; InChI=1/C14H24NO4PS3/c1-12(2)18-20(21,19-13(3)4)22-11-10-15-23(16,17)14-8-6-5-7-9-14/h5-9,12-13,15H,10-11H2,1-4H3 Key: RRNIZKPFKNDSRS-UHFFFAOYAE
- SMILES: CC(C)OP(=S)(OC(C)C)SCCNS(=O)(=O)C1=CC=CC=C1

Properties
Chemical formula	C_{14}H_{24}NO_{4}PS_{3}
Molar mass	397.50 g·mol^{−1}
Appearance	Colorless liquid or white crystalline solid
Density	1.224 g/mL
Melting point	34.4 °C (93.9 °F; 307.5 K)
Solubility in water	5.6 mg/L @ 20 C
Solubility in organic solvents	Soluble

Pharmacology
Legal status	AU: S6 (Poison)
- Except where otherwise noted, data are given for materials in their standard state (at 25 °C [77 °F], 100 kPa). verify (what is ?) Infobox references

Bensulide is a selective organophosphate herbicide. It is one of a few organophosphate compounds that are used as an herbicide. Most of the others are used as insecticides. It is used on vegetable crops such as carrots, cucumbers, peppers, and melons and in cotton and turfgrass to control annual grasses such as bluegrass and crabgrass and broadleaf weeds. It is often applied before the weed seeds germinate (pre-emergence) in order to prevent them from germinating. It is available as granules or an emulsifiable concentrate. Estimates place the total use of bensulide in the United States at about 632,000 pounds annually. Application rates may be relatively heavy (up to 22.6 kg/ha) when it is used. The EPA classifies bensulide as a general use pesticide.

== Application ==
Bensulide generally is applied to bare soil, before crops are planted. It is incorporated 1 to 2 inches deep in order for the control of grasses and broadleaf weeds in agricultural crops, residential grass lawns, and golf courses.

== Uses ==
Proturk Goosegrass and Crabgrass Control and Anderson's Goose and Crabgrass Control both have bensulide as one of their active ingredients, along with oxadiazon at a concentration of 5.25% and 1.31% respectively. Bensulide products may be used outdoors by homeowners on lawns and ornamentals, and by professional lawn care operators. Bensulide may be used on turf (primarily golf course greens and tees), on ornamentals, and for greenhouse and outdoor uses in commercial nurseries. 550,000 pounds of active ingredient are used per year, a relatively low value.

== Risks ==
There are a few minor risks that are involved with herbicides that include bensulide. Generally, indirect exposure to it is non-lethal. Dietary exposures from eating food crops treated with bensulide are below the level of concern for the entire U.S. population, including infants and children. Drinking water is not a significant source of exposure.

Risks are of concern for homeowners who apply bensulide, and for children entering turf areas treated with bensulide if label directions are not followed properly. EPA also has risk concerns for workers who mix, load, and/or apply bensulide to agricultural sites, golf courses, and home lawns. Chronic risks are of concern for birds and mammals; risks are posed to some aquatic species.
