= Dimethyl phosphorochloridothioate =

Names
- Preferred IUPAC name O,S-Dimethyl phosphorochloridothioate

Identifiers
CAS Number	3711-50-0
3D model (JSmol)	Interactive image
ChemSpider	10450221
EC Number	219-754-9
PubChem CID	13358089
UNII	WE2M4PT2J5
CompTox Dashboard (EPA)	DTXSID201285730
- InChI: InChI=1S/C2H6ClO2PS/c1-5-6(3,4)7-2/h1-2H3 Key: NBAUXRCSDWYKRP-UHFFFAOYSA-N; InChI=1/C2H6ClO2PS/c1-5-6(3,4)7-2/h1-2H3 Key: NBAUXRCSDWYKRP-UHFFFAOYAW
- SMILES: ClP(=O)(OC)SC

Properties
Chemical formula	C_{2}H_{6}ClO_{2}PS
Molar mass	160.55 g·mol^{−1}
- Except where otherwise noted, data are given for materials in their standard state (at 25 °C [77 °F], 100 kPa). Infobox references

Dimethyl phosphorochloridothioate is an organophosphate compound used as an intermediate for insecticides, pesticides, and fungicides, as well as additives for oil and gasoline, plasticizers corrosion inhibitors; flame retardants and flotation agents. It is an irritant for skin, eyes, and mucous membranes.

== Uses ==
Dimethyl phosphorochloridothionate is used to synthesize the widely used and highly toxic insecticide Parathion by reacting it with sodium p-nitrophenate.

Dimethyl phosphorochloridothionate is also known to have been used to synthesize other organophosphate compounds such as O,O-dimethyl phosphoramidothioate, which is an intermediate used in producting other insecticides such as Acephate.
