= Polymer blend =

Material composed of at least two polymers mixed together

In materials science, a polymer blend, or polymer mixture, is a member of a class of materials analogous to metal alloys, in which at least two polymers are blended together to create a new material with different physical properties.

== History ==
During the 1940s, '50s and '60s, the commercial development of new monomers for production of new polymers seemed endless. In this period, it was discovered that the development of the new techniques for the modification of the already existing polymers, would be economically viable.

The first technique of modification developed was the polymerization, in other words, the joint polymerization of more than one kind of polymer.

A new polymers modification process, based on a simple mechanical mixture of two polymers first appeared when Thomas Hancock created a mixture of natural rubber with gutta-percha. This process generated a new polymer class called "polymer blends."

== Basic concepts ==
Polymer blends can be broadly divided into three categories:

- immiscible polymer blends (heterogeneous polymer blends): This is by far the most populous group. If the blend is made of two polymers, two glass transition temperatures will be observed.
- compatible polymer blends: Immiscible polymer blends that exhibit macroscopically uniform physical properties. The macroscopically uniform properties are usually caused by sufficiently strong interactions between the component polymers.
- miscible polymer blends (homogeneous polymer blends): Polymer blend that is a single-phase structure. In this case, one glass transition temperature will be observed.

The use of the term polymer alloy for a polymer blend is discouraged, as the former term includes multiphase copolymers but excludes incompatible polymer blends.

Examples of miscible polymer blends:

- homopolymer–homopolymer:
  - polyphenylene oxide (PPO) – polystyrene (PS): noryl developed by General Electric Plastics in 1966 (now owned by SABIC). The miscibility of the two polymers in noryl is caused by the presence of an aromatic ring in the repeat units of both chains.
  - polyethylene terephthalate (PET) – polybutylene terephthalate (PBT)
  - poly(methyl methacrylate) (PMMA) – polyvinylidene fluoride (PVDF)
- homopolymer–copolymer:
  - polypropylene (PP) – EPDM
  - polycarbonate (PC) – acrylonitrile butadiene styrene (ABS): Bayblend, Pulse, Anjablend A

Polymer blends can be used as thermoplastic elastomers.

== See also ==
- Flory–Huggins solution theory
- Emulsion dispersion
