= Dichlofenthion =

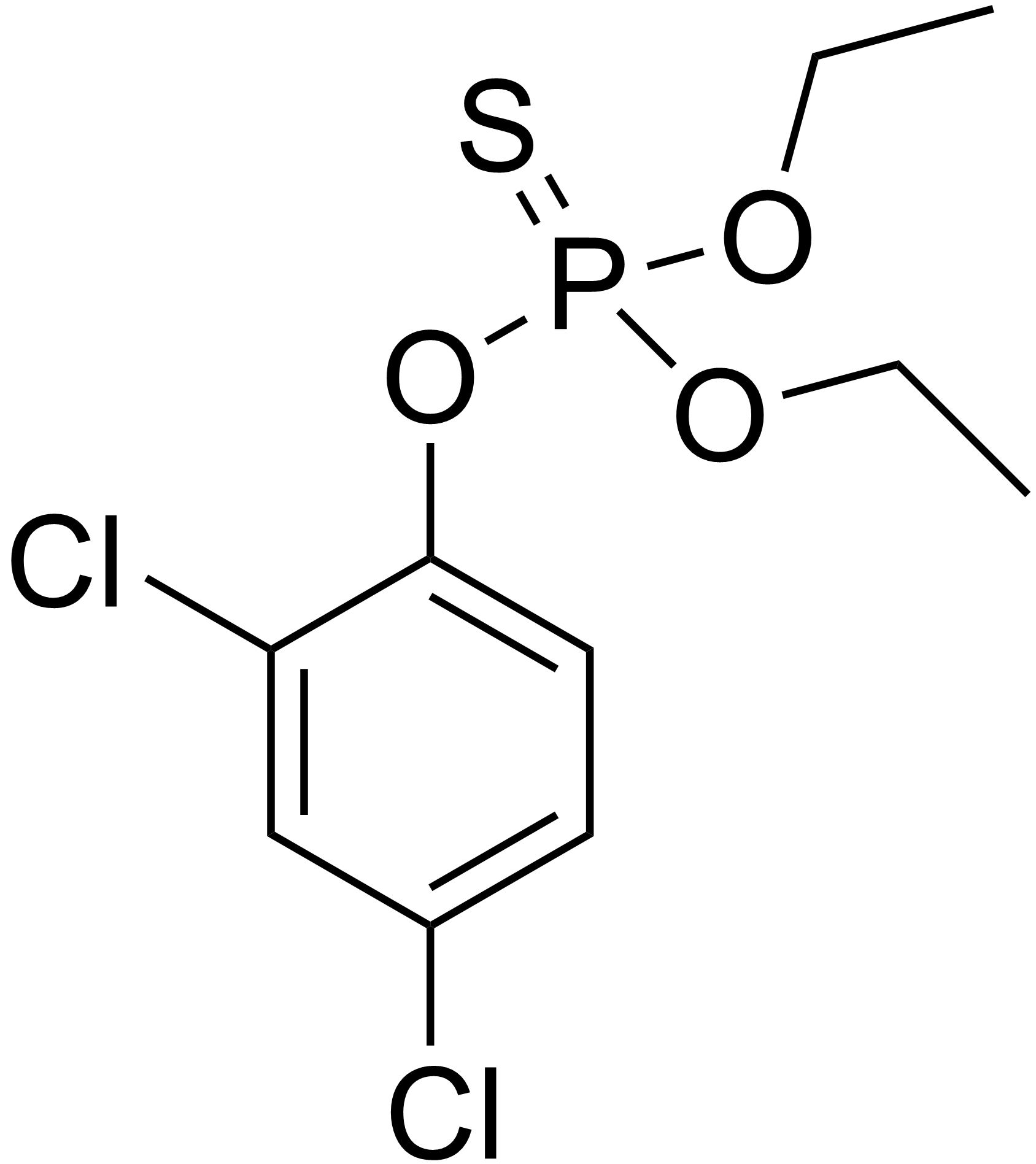

Names
- Preferred IUPAC name O-(2,4-Dichlorophenyl) O,O-diethyl phosphorothioate
- Other names Dichlofenthion, Dichlofention, Dichlorfenthion, Dichlorofenthion, Diclophenthion, Diclofenthion, Hexanema, Mobilawn, Nemacide, Phosphorothioic acid, ECP, VC-13

Identifiers
CAS Number	97-17-6
3D model (JSmol)	Interactive image
ChEMBL	ChEMBL1396626
ChemSpider	7051
ECHA InfoCard	100.002.332
KEGG	C18398
PubChem CID	7328
UNII	64234GT8TT
CompTox Dashboard (EPA)	DTXSID8040274
- InChI: InChI=1S/C10H13Cl2O3PS/c1-3-13-16(17,14-4-2)15-10-6-5-8(11)7-9(10)12/h5-7H,3-4H2,1-2H3 Key: WGOWCPGHOCIHBW-UHFFFAOYSA-N; InChI=1/C10H13Cl2O3PS/c1-3-13-16(17,14-4-2)15-10-6-5-8(11)7-9(10)12/h5-7H,3-4H2,1-2H3 Key: WGOWCPGHOCIHBW-UHFFFAOYAB
- SMILES: CCOP(=S)(OCC)Oc1cc(Cl)cc(Cl)c1

Properties
Chemical formula	C_{10}H_{13}Cl_{2}O_{3}PS
Molar mass	315.16 g/mol
Appearance	colourless to pale yellow liquid
Boiling point	123 °C (253 °F; 396 K)
Solubility in water	0.245 mg/L Slightly soluble in water; highly soluble in organic solvents such as benzene, chloroform, and acetone

Hazards
Flash point	Non-flammable
- Except where otherwise noted, data are given for materials in their standard state (at 25 °C [77 °F], 100 kPa). verify (what is ?) Infobox references

== Introduction and History ==
Dichlofenthion (IUPAC name: O-(2,4-dichlorophenyl) O,O-diethyl phosphorothioate) is a fat-soluble organophosphorus compound primarily used in agricultural practices as a pesticide and nematicide to control a variety of insect pests. Organophosphates as a class were initially developed in the early 20th century, with some of the earliest compounds being synthesized as potential chemical warfare agents during and after World War I. However, their potent action on the nervous system quickly led to their adoption in agriculture to control pests that affect crops. Until the 21st century, they were among the most widely used insecticides available. Dichlofenthion emerged in the mid-20th century as part of the search for more effective and selective insecticides that could provide better crop protection with reduced environmental and health impacts.

== Structure Reactivity Synthesis ==
=== Structure ===
The molecular structure of dichlofenthion includes a diethyl phosphorothioate group (C4H11O3PS) attached to a dichlorophenyl ring. This structure is crucial for its activity as an insecticide, with the phosphorothioate (PS_{4−x}O_{x}^{3−}) moiety playing a key role in the inhibition of acetylcholinesterase.

=== Reactivity ===
Dichlofenthion is stable under normal conditions but can be hydrolyzed in the presence of strong acids or bases. It is also susceptible to oxidative degradation, which can lead to the formation of more toxic metabolites.

=== Synthesis ===
The synthesis of dichlofenthion involves the reaction of 2,4-dichlophenol with diethyl thiophosphoryl chloride, which requires careful control of conditions to ensure the formation of the desired product and minimize by-products.

== Metabolism / Biotransformation ==
Biotransformation of dichlofenthion mainly occur during the formation of more polar conjugates as it is lipophilic. Therefore, causing for formation of metabolites during biotransformation which would result in change in toxicity. These biotransformation reactions involve Phase I and Phase II reactions.

=== Phase I reaction ===
Phase I reaction involves oxidation and hydrolysis which would result in dichlofenthion reacting with polar groups such as hydroxyl (-OH), carboxyl (-COOH), thiol (-SH) and amino (-NH2) group. This would result in the formation of dichlorovinyl phosphate metabolite and other metabolites which may be more toxic than its parent compound.

Hydrolysis of dichlofenthion occurs when plasma and tissue enzymes break down the phosphorus-ester bond present in dichlofenthion, leading to the formation of dichlorovinyl phosphate. These groups of enzymes are known as A-esterase or peroxidase, and by the cytochrome p-450 systems. A-esterase are located in plasma and hepatic endoplasmic reticulum and can hydrolyse organophosphorus compounds by splitting the anhydride, P-F, P-CN, or ester bond. Paraxonase is produced in the liver, together with cytochrome p0450 systems, both types of enzymes are also responsible for the hydrolysis of dichlofenthion. A study done by Environmental Health Perspectives to observe hydrolysis rate of organophosphates were measured and recorded in the table below. Although conditions were extreme, the study showed that there was presence of hydrolysis occurring for dichlofenthion.

Halflife of Organophosphates
Chemical	Halflife, hr
Dichlofenthion	19

Data of Ruzicks et al.

Oxidative reactions may also occur during Phase I metabolism of dichlofenthion. This involves an addition of oxygen to dichlofenthion, which can lead to the formation of oxidized intermediates which may be more polar than its parent compound. Oxidation reactions may also occur an oxidative cleavage of dichlofenthion, leading to the formation of metabolites with altered chemical properties. Thirdly, hydroxylation would lead to hydroxylated metabolites. Lastly, epoxidation, which involves the formation of episode function groups, would lead to the formation of reactive epoxide metabolites which can undergo further biotransformation to a more toxic compound.

=== Phase II reaction ===
Phase II reactions involve the conjugation of the parent compound or its Phase I metabolites with endogenous compounds to increase their water solubility and facilitate excretion. Common conjugation reactions include glucuronidation, sulfation, and amino acid conjugation. Dichlofenthion and its Phase I metabolites can undergo conjugation with molecules such as glucuronic acid, sulphate, or amino acids.

Glucuronic acid molecules are added to dichlofenthion or its phase I molecules to its hydroxyl (-OH) group, this process is known as glucuronidation, which is catalysed by enzymes UDP-glucuronosyltransferase (UGTs). Sulfation refers to the addition of a sulphate group which is catalysed by sulfotransferase enzymes which utilizes 3’-phosphoadenosine-5'phosphosulfate (PAPS). Sulphate group is usually added to hydroxyl (-OH) or amino groups (-NH2) of the compound. Amino acid conjugation refers to the addition of an amino acid moiety like glycine or taurine to the compound on reactive functional groups. The reaction of catalysed in the liver and other.

However, it is notable that the biotransformation pathways of dichlofenthion can vary based on species, individual genetic makeup, and environmental factors due to the presence and absence of different enzymes. Hence, it is important to account for the type of organism when assessing risk and for the development of treatments in cases of poisoning. This can be done through research that monitors biotransformation of dichlofenthion in different organisms.

== Use/Purpose, Availability, Efficacy ==
Dichlofenthion is an organophosphate insecticide that has been used in agricultural settings to control a variety of insect pests. The detailed uses, availability, and efficacy of dichlofenthion involve several aspects, including its application on crops, regulatory status, and effectiveness against pests.

=== Detailed Uses ===
Dichlofenthion is used for agricultural pest control on fruits, vegetables, grains, and ornamental plants. It works well against aphids, caterpillars, beetles, leafhoppers, and mites. It is also used as livestock and poultry pest control, used in the facilities to control mosquitoes and flies. It is helpful against flies, ticks, lice, and other ectoparasites that can affect the health and productivity of livestock and poultry. This compound can also help with stored product protection such as grains, seeds, and other agricultural products. It keeps away weevils, beetles, and moths during transportation of the produce and storage.

For the public, dichlofenthion is also used to help with vector control. It works toward mosquitoes and flies to prevent the spread of diseases like malaria, dengue fever, zika virus, and west Nile virus in the population. It can be applied to breeding sites, resting areas, or sprayed over large area. Besides that, this compound can be used to control residential pests like ants, cockroaches, and spiders. This can be seen in the presence of this compound in household pest sprays, baits, and granules.

=== Availability ===
The availability of dichlofenthion is heavily influenced by its regulatory status, which varies by country and region. Due to concerns over toxicity and environmental impact, its use has been restricted or banned in some jurisdictions. Regulatory agencies, such as the Environmental Protection Agency (EPA) in the United States, Chemical safety and biosafety (OECD), or the European Food Safety Authority (EFSA) in the European Union, assess the safety and approve the use of pesticides like dichlofenthion.

Where it is registered for use, dichlofenthion can be found in various formulations mentioned above, including emulsifiable concentrates and granules, designed to suit different application needs and crop types. The availability of these products is high as this chemical can be found in a variety of household and agricultural products.

=== Efficacy ===
Dichlofenthion is effective against a broad spectrum of insect pests. Its mode of action, inhibiting acetylcholinesterase, is generally effective against a wide range of insects. Dichlofenthion can achieve a high mortality rate towards pests as it inhibits acetylcholinesterase (AChE). AChE hydrolyses the neurotransmitter acetylcholine (ACh) in insects to terminate neuronal excitement at the postsynaptic membrane. Therefore, it uses targeted towards pest control in different aspects of society is effective.

However, the efficacy of dichlofenthion can be compromised by the development of resistance in pest populations through natural selection. Surviving pests may carry a gene that may help with the resistance towards dichlofenthion. This issue is not unique to dichlofenthion but is a common challenge with all insecticides. Therefore, integrated pest management (IPM) practices, including the rotation of insecticides with different modes of action, are recommended to preserve the efficacy of products like dichlofenthion.

== Molecular mechanism of action ==
Dichlofenthion is an acetylcholinesterase (AChE) inhibitor (or anti-cholinesterase). The detailed mechanism of action of dichlofenthion, an organophosphate insecticide, involves the inhibition of the enzyme acetylcholinesterase (AChE), which plays a critical role in nerve signal transmission. Acetylcholinesterase is responsible for breaking down acetylcholine (ACh), a neurotransmitter, in the synaptic cleft, which is the gap between neurons or between a neuron and a muscle cell. By degrading acetylcholine, AChE terminates the signal transmission, allowing the nerve cells to reset for the next signal. When dichlofenthion inhibits AChE, it causes an accumulation of acetylcholine in the synaptic cleft. This leads to continuous stimulation of the nerves, muscles, and glands, resulting in a range of symptoms and potential for toxicity.

=== Breakdown of Molecular Mechanism of Action of Dichlofenthion ===
Acetylcholine (ACh) and Acetylcholinesterase (AChE)

Acetylcholine (ACh) is a neurotransmitter involved in the transmission of nerve impulses across synapses and neuromuscular junctions. It binds to receptors on the post-synaptic neuron or muscle cell, initiating a response.

Acetylcholinesterase (AChE) is the enzyme responsible for breaking down ACh in the synaptic cleft, the space between neurons or between a neuron and a muscle cell. This breakdown is necessary to terminate the signal and allow the synapse to reset for the next transmission.

Interaction of Dichlofenthion with AChE

1. Inhibition of AChE: Dichlofenthion, being an organophosphate compound, irreversibly binds to the serine hydroxyl group in the active site of acetylcholinesterase (AChE). This action forms a covalent bond between the enzyme and dichlofenthion, which irreversibly deactivates AChE as an enzyme, rendering AChE unable to hydrolyze acetylcholine.
2. Accumulation of ACh: As a result of AChE inhibition, ACh accumulates in the synaptic cleft because it cannot be properly metabolized. This leads to continuous stimulation of the receptors on the post-synaptic neuron or muscle cell.
3. Overstimulation: The overaccumulation of ACh results in continuous stimulation of both muscarinic and nicotinic acetylcholine receptors which becomes excessive. Muscarinic receptors are found in various tissues throughout the body, including smooth muscle, cardiac muscle, and glands. When overstimulated, muscarinic receptors cause symptoms such as salivation, lacrimation, urination, defecation, gastric cramps, emesis (SLUDGE syndrome), and miosis. Nicotinic receptors are primarily located in the neuromuscular junctions of skeletal muscle fibres. Nicotinic receptor overstimulation leads to sweating, muscle twitching, weakness, paralysis, and potentially respiratory failure due to paralysis of the diaphragm. The overstimulation of these receptors leads to excessive cholinergic activity in the nervous system and other target tissues.

Based on the chemical and toxicological characteristics of dichlofenthion, it is lipophilic. Over time, it undergoes dynamic equilibrium, releasing back into the circulatory system. Within the body, dichlofenthion is metabolically transformed into either the more toxic oxon or the oxidized form of dichlofenthion.

=== Delayed onset poisoning ===
Dichlofenthion exhibits delayed onset symptoms, meaning there is a significant time lapse between ingestion and the appearance of noticeable effects. The typical timeframe of cholinergic symptoms and signs occurs within 24 hours of exposure. For dichlofenthion poisoning, these symptoms and signs are observed 40–48 hours after exposure. This delay can lead to a false sense of security, potentially delaying medical intervention. Despite this delayed onset, dichlofenthion poisoning can cause severe and life-threatening symptoms, emphasizing the importance of prompt medical attention.

== Possible treatments ==
=== Recovery from inhibition ===
The inhibition of AChE by dichlofenthion is considered irreversible under normal conditions, meaning the enzyme cannot perform its function again, and the body must synthesize new AChE. However, certain treatments can be employed in cases of poisoning:

=== Atropine ===
Atropine is a competitive antagonist of muscarinic acetylcholine receptors. It is used to treat muscarinic symptoms but does not reverse AChE inhibition. It can counteract the excessive cholinergic activity caused by dichlofenthion poisoning by blocking muscarinic receptors. Atropine administration helps alleviate symptoms such as excessive salivation, bronchoconstriction, and bradycardia. The goal of administering atropine is to prevent bradycardia, maintain blood pressure, clear lungs and dry skin.

=== Pralidoxime (2-PAM) ===
Pralidoxime is an oxime compound that can reactivate acetylcholinesterase inhibited by organophosphate pesticides like dichlofenthion, if administered early. It works by cleaving the phosphorylated enzyme and restoring the acetylcholinesterase activity. However, its effectiveness can vary depending on the specific organophosphate involved. Pralidoxime is often administered in conjunction with atropine to enhance the treatment of organophosphate poisoning.

Limitations of Pralidoxime

According to Palaniappen, V. (2013), a study in the management of organophosphorus compound poisoning, the following conclusions can be drawn. Despite observing clear reactivation of red cell acetylcholinesterase in patients poisoned with diethyl organophosphorus pesticides, such as dichlofenthion, there is no evidence that this treatment regimen improves survival rates or reduces the need for intubation in cases of organophosphorus insecticide poisoning. The reasons for this lack of beneficial effect remain unclear. Furthermore, meta-analysis of oxime trials has shown an overall null effect or potential harm associated with oxime therapies. The largest oxime study tended to result in harm, with only one study demonstrating a reduction in mortality. This, however, could be attributed to limitations of the study factors – such as study designs, timing, dose of oximes, types of compounds, and toxicity of antidotes. Therefore, further investigation into different dose regimens or alternative oxime therapies is warranted to address this issue.

=== Supportive care ===
Patients suffering from dichlofenthion poisoning may require supportive care in a medical facility. This includes airway management, oxygen therapy, and mechanical ventilation in cases of respiratory failure. Intravenous fluids may also be administered to maintain hydration and electrolyte balance.

=== Decontamination ===
If exposure to dichlofenthion occurs through ingestion or dermal contact, decontamination procedures such as rinsing the skin or eyes with water and removing contaminated clothing should be performed promptly to minimize further absorption of the pesticide.

=== Monitoring and observation ===
Patients should be closely monitored for signs of respiratory distress, cardiovascular complications, and neurological symptoms. Continuous monitoring allows for timely intervention and adjustment of treatment strategies as needed.

It is essential to seek medical attention immediately in cases of suspected dichlofenthion poisoning to ensure appropriate treatment and prevent potentially life-threatening complications. Additionally, proper handling and application practices should be followed to minimize the risk of exposure to organophosphate pesticides like dichlofenthion.

== Toxicology Data ==
There are established parameters that are used to measure the toxicity of a substance, in this case, dichlofenthion.

=== LD50 (Lethal Dose 50) ===
This is the amount of dichlofenthion that is lethal to half of the subjects exposed to it. It can be measured by ingestion, oral LD50, by applying it to the skin, dermal LD50, or by administration in form of vapour, inhalation LD50.

Oral LD50: 270 mg/kg (rat)

Dermal LD50: 6000 mg/kg (rabbit)

=== LC50 (Lethal Concentration 50) ===
This is the quantity of dichlofenthion that is suspended in the air that kills 50% of the subjects exposed to it.

LC50: 1.75 mg/l (rat)

=== NOAEL (no observed adverse effect level) ===
This is the highest concentration of a substance at which there is no effect detected. Long term exposure effects including impact on the immune system, neurological symptoms and disruption of the endocrine system are measured.

NOAEL: 0.75 mg/kg (rat)

=== LOAEL (lowest observed adverse effect level) ===
This refers to the lowest dose of a physical agent or chemical substance that causes harmful effects.

LOAEL: 80 mg/kg

The GHS classification categorizes dichlofenthion as acute toxic, irritant, corrosive, flammable, as being a health hazard and an environmental hazard.

== Side/Adverse Effects ==
=== Environmental and Health Impact ===
Dichlofenthion is an organophosphate insecticide that has previously been used in various countries for agricultural purposes to control pests. The compound is still persistent in the environment today. Consequently, areas where agricultural practices involve the use of dichlofenthion may pose risks of exposure to humans. Some countries where dichlofenthion has been historically used or may still be in use include:

United States	Dichlofenthion has been registered for use in the United States for various agricultural applications. It has been used in the control of pests on crops such as cotton, fruits, vegetables, and ornamental plants.
Japan	Dichlofenthion has been used in Japan for agricultural pest control, particularly in rice paddies and other crops. Dichlofenthion was used for chemical terrorism in 1994–1995.
China	China has also used dichlofenthion for agricultural purposes, including pest control in crops such as rice and cotton.
Brazil	Brazil is one of the largest agricultural producers globally and has used dichlofenthion for pest control in crops such as soybeans, corn, and sugarcane.
European Union	While dichlofenthion has been used historically in some European countries for pest control, its use has been restricted or banned in recent years due to concerns about its environmental and health impacts. However, residues may persist in the environment in some regions.
Other countries	Dichlofenthion is still being used as a pesticide in various developing countries for agricultural pest control, depending on local regulations and agricultural practices.

Figure 1: Countries detailing where dichlofenthion has been used historically and for what purposes.

In areas where dichlofenthion has been used or is still in use, individuals involved in agricultural activities, including farmers, farmworkers, and pesticide applicators, may be at risk of exposure. Additionally, people living near agricultural areas where dichlofenthion is used may also be exposed to the pesticide through environmental contamination, such as runoff into water sources or drift of pesticide residues. Proper handling, application, and safety precautions are essential to minimize the risks of exposure to dichlofenthion and other pesticides in agricultural settings.

The effectiveness of dichlofenthion must be balanced with considerations of its environmental persistence, potential for bioaccumulation, and toxicity to non-target organisms, including humans. These factors can limit its use or dictate the application methods and safety measures required to minimize adverse effects.

==== Environmental fate ====
Dichlofenthion has a relatively short half-life of only a few minutes in both water and soils. While little research has been conducted over the environmental fate of this compound, much is known about the compound class in which it resides.

Dichlofenthion is generally considered to be an organophosphate pesticide, although chemically it is a phosphorothioate. Because most organophosphate pesticides biodegrade relatively quickly, they are generally regarded as safe for use. While this may be true for most compounds, bacteria still require time to adapt to break down new compounds introduced to the soil. It has been shown that degradation rates increase as the same compounds are introduced repeatedly into the soil.

Because the absorption to soil and sediment is considered high, dichlofenthion is not a highly mobile compound. The estimated half-life of dichlofenthion in water, soil, and sediment is less than a few minutes. The estimated half-life in the air is 2.78 hours, much higher than that in water, soil, and sediment. The estimated wastewater treatment removal efficiency is 84%, with approximately 5% to air.

Bioaccumulation potential: consists of how a substance accumulates in a living organism, additionally, this could lead to indirect exposure for organisms at the top of the food chain.

Since dichlofenthion is an organophosphate, it generally does not bioaccumulate to the same extent as other types of pesticides such as organochlorine.

Persistence and degradation: provides data about how long does a certain chemical remain active in the environment; this data includes half-life, in soil and water, and its degradation, which happens through processes such as photolysis, hydrolysis, microbial action...

Dichlofenthion persistence in the environment can pose risks to wildlife and contaminate water sources.

=== Ecotoxicity ===
It refers to the capability of a chemical to cause harm to non-target organisms and the environment.

Dichlofenthion's ecotoxicity affects mainly fish and other aquatic invertebrates.

==== Health ====
Human acute organophosphorus poisoning can result from occupational, accidental, criminal, or intentional exposure (i.e. suicidal ingestion).

===== Muscarinic effects =====
Acute muscarinic effects on the heart can be life-threatening, including bradycardia, hypotension, and cardiac conduction abnormalities due to heightened vagal tone. In the respiratory system, muscarinic activation leads to bronchoconstriction, increased bronchial secretions, and potential respiratory distress. Gastrointestinal disturbances manifest as heightened motility, resulting in abdominal discomfort, diarrhea, and nausea. Urinary effects encompass urgency, frequency, and, in severe instances, incontinence due to muscarinic stimulation in the urinary tract.

===== Nicotinic effects =====
The nicotinic effects of dichlorofenthion predominantly target neuromuscular junctions, triggering a range of muscular and neurological symptoms. By inhibiting acetylcholinesterase, dichlorofenthion prolongs the activation of nicotinic receptors, leading to muscle fasciculations, weakness, and potentially paralysis, with respiratory muscles being particularly vulnerable. Additionally, dichlorofenthion's interaction with nicotinic receptors in the central nervous system can induce neurological manifestations such as headache, dizziness, and confusion. In severe cases, dichlorofenthion poisoning may progress to seizures and coma, highlighting its profound impact on both muscular and neurological functions.

=== Carcinogenicity ===
The risk of a substance to cause or induce any type of tumour or increase the chances of having a tumour after coming into contact with it in any way.

Dichlofenthion may cause cancer if swallowed, therefore it is a carcinogen.

=== Reproductive toxicity ===
This parameter measures whether a compound could potentially cause adverse effects on the fertility and sexual functioning of adults as well as their offspring.

Dichlofenthion is suspected of damaging the possible offspring of someone that has been exposed to it.

In experiments performed with both rats and mice, reduced fetal weight and embryotoxic effects were observed.

=== Germ cell mutagenicity ===
This refers to the possibility of induction of mutations in the germ cells which will be passed on to offspring after being exposed to a chemical or any other substance.

It is suspected that dichlofenthion causes genetic defects if exposed to it.
