= Pyrazophos =

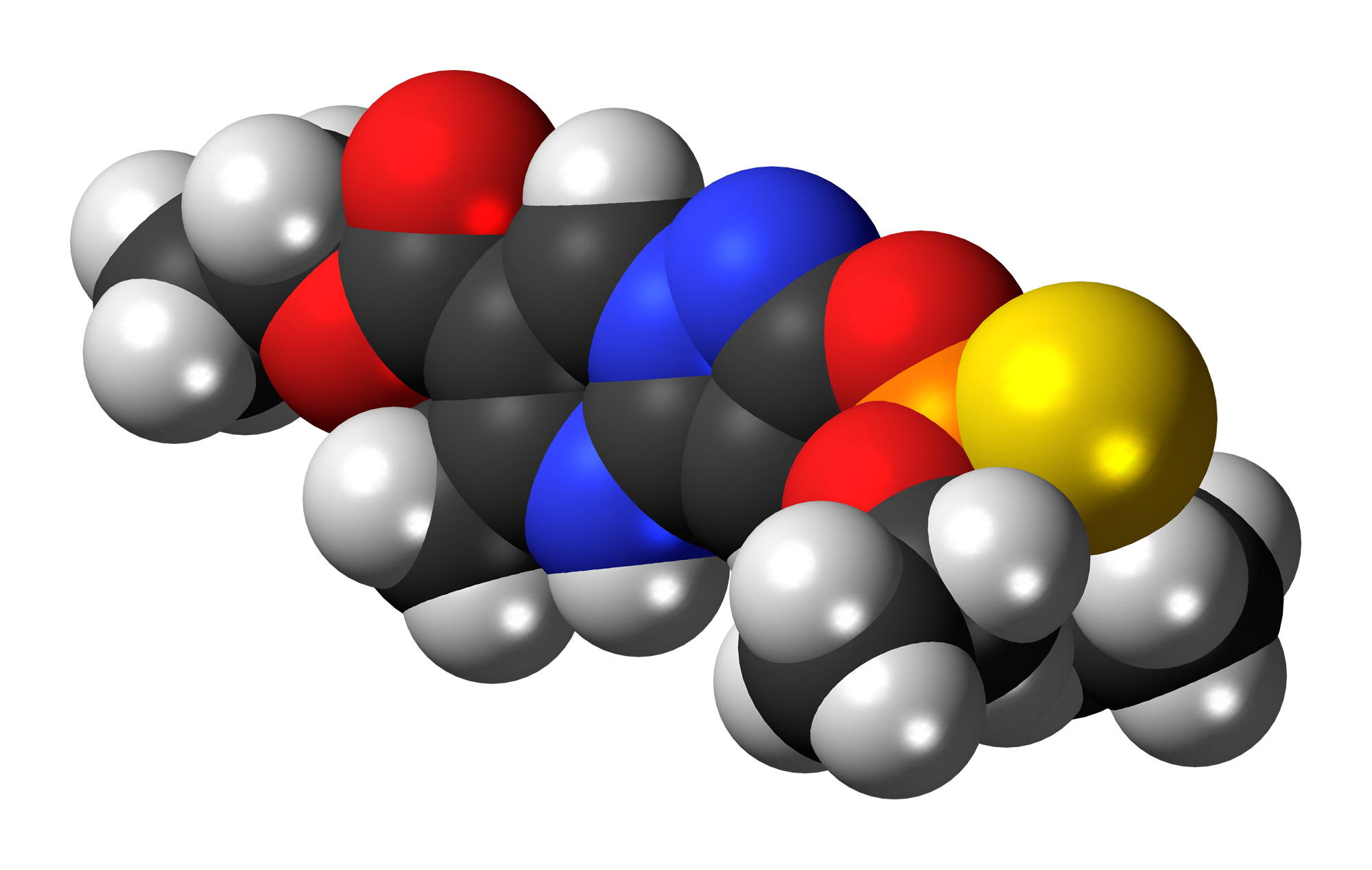

Names
- Preferred IUPAC name Ethyl 2-[(diethoxyphosphorothioyl)oxy]-5-methylpyrazolo[1,5-a]pyrimidine-6-carboxylate
- Other names Curamil (AgrEvo)

Identifiers
| CAS Number | 13457-18-6 |
| 3D model (JSmol) | Interactive image |
| ChEBI | CHEBI:81942 |
| ChemSpider | 24247 |
| ECHA InfoCard | 100.033.310 |
| PubChem CID | 26033 |
| UNII | BEG0A8I17D |
| CompTox Dashboard (EPA) | DTXSID7042352 |
- InChI: InChI=1S/C14H20N3O5PS/c1-5-19-14(18)11-9-17-12(15-10(11)4)8-13(16-17)22-23(24,20-6-2)21-7-3/h8-9H,5-7H2,1-4H3 Key: JOOMJVFZQRQWKR-UHFFFAOYSA-N
- SMILES: S=P(OCC)(OCC)Oc1nn2cc(c(nc2c1)C)C(=O)OCC

Properties
| Chemical formula | C_{14}H_{20}N_{3}O_{5}PS |
| Molar mass | 373.36 g·mol^{−1} |
| Appearance | Green to brown solid |
| Density | 1.348 g/cm^{3} |
| Melting point | 51 to 52 °C (124 to 126 °F; 324 to 325 K) |
| Boiling point | decomposes at 160 °C |
| Solubility in water | 4.2 mg/L |

Hazards
| Flash point | 32 to 36 °C (90 to 97 °F; 305 to 309 K) |
- Except where otherwise noted, data are given for materials in their standard state (at 25 °C [77 °F], 100 kPa). Infobox references

Pyrazophos is an organic compound used as a fungicide and an insecticide.

== Uses ==
Pyrazophos is a systemic fungicide which is used in orchards, vineyards and vegetable crops against powdery mildew. In some instances, the compound is also an effective insecticide (e.g. against leaf-miner flies).

== History ==
The compound has been commercially available since 1970.
