= Tris(2,3-dibromopropyl) phosphate =

Names
- Preferred IUPAC name Tris(2,3-dibromopropyl) phosphate
- Other names Fyrol HB 32; Tris

Identifiers
CAS Number	126-72-7
3D model (JSmol)	Interactive image
ChEBI	CHEBI:82282
ChemSpider	29089
ECHA InfoCard	100.004.364
PubChem CID	31356
UNII	X7O89N7ZY0
CompTox Dashboard (EPA)	DTXSID5021413
- InChI: InChI=1S/C9H15Br6O4P/c10-1-7(13)4-17-20(16,18-5-8(14)2-11)19-6-9(15)3-12/h7-9H,1-6H2
- SMILES: BrCC(Br)COP(=O)(OCC(Br)CBr)OCC(Br)CBr

Properties
Chemical formula	C_{9}H_{15}Br_{6}O_{4}P
Molar mass	697.613 g·mol^{−1}
Appearance	Viscous pale yellow liquid
Density	2.24 g/cm^{3}
Solubility in water	Insoluble

Hazards
- Occupational safety and health (OHS/OSH)
Main hazards	Carcinogenic, use restricted
Flash point	> 110 °C (230 °F)
- Except where otherwise noted, data are given for materials in their standard state (at 25 °C [77 °F], 100 kPa). Infobox references

Tris(2,3-dibromopropyl) phosphate ("tris") is a chemical once widely used as a flame retardant in plastics and textiles.

== Safety and regulation ==
Tris is mutagenic and listed as an IARC Group 2A carcinogen. It is one of the chemicals covered by the Rotterdam Convention. In the United States, the Consumer Product Safety Commission banned the sale of children's garments containing tris in 1977. This regulatory change came about as a result of the research of Bruce Ames and Arlene Blum.

== See also ==
- Tris(1,3-dichloro-2-propyl)phosphate
- Tris(2-chloroethyl) phosphate
