= Dimethyl chlorothiophosphate =

Names
- Preferred IUPAC name O,O-Dimethyl phosphorochloridothioate
- Other names DMPCT; Dimethylchlorothiophosphate; O,O-dimethyl phosphorochloridothioate

Identifiers
CAS Number	2524-03-0
3D model (JSmol)	Interactive image
ChemSpider	16374
ECHA InfoCard	100.017.959
EC Number	219-754-9
PubChem CID	17304
UNII	8D5OSC5UN4
UN number	2267
CompTox Dashboard (EPA)	DTXSID0027486
- InChI: InChI=1S/C2H6ClO2PS/c1-4-6(3,7)5-2/h1-2H3 Key: XFBJRFNXPUCPKU-UHFFFAOYSA-N
- SMILES: COP(=S)(OC)Cl

Properties
Chemical formula	C_{2}H_{6}ClO_{2}PS
Molar mass	160.55 g·mol^{−1}

Hazards
- GHS labelling
Pictograms	(GHS05: Corrosive) (GHS06: Toxic) (GHS07: Exclamation mark)
Signal word	Danger
Hazard statements	H301, H302, H311, H312, H314, H315, H330, H331, H335, H412
Precautionary statements	P260, P264, P270, P271, P273, P280, P284, P301+P310, P301+P312, P301+P330+P331, P302+P352, P303+P361+P353, P304+P340, P305+P351+P338, P310, P311, P312, P320, P321, P330, P332+P313, P361, P362, P363, P403+P233, P405, P501
- Except where otherwise noted, data are given for materials in their standard state (at 25 °C [77 °F], 100 kPa). Infobox references

Dimethyl chlorothiophosphate is a chemical that is used as an intermediate in the manufacture of pesticides and plasticisers. It is an organophosphate with sulfur and chlorine also bonded to the central phosphorus atom.

In 1985 American Cyanamid had an accidental release of this chemical from its Linden plant, and it was smelled 32 km away.
