= 2-Ethylhexyl diphenyl phosphate =

Names
- Preferred IUPAC name 2-Ethylhexyl diphenyl phosphate
- Other names Disflamoll DPO (Lanxess); Phosflex 362 (ICL-IP)

Identifiers
CAS Number	1241-94-7
3D model (JSmol)	Interactive image
ChEMBL	ChEMBL2105213
ChemSpider	14040
ECHA InfoCard	100.013.625
EC Number	214-987-2
KEGG	D05224
PubChem CID	14716
UNII	4F53Z6NE1Y
UN number	3082
CompTox Dashboard (EPA)	DTXSID1025300
- InChI: InChI=1S/C20H27O4P/c1-3-5-12-18(4-2)17-22-25(21,23-19-13-8-6-9-14-19)24-20-15-10-7-11-16-20/h6-11,13-16,18H,3-5,12,17H2,1-2H3 Key: CGSLYBDCEGBZCG-UHFFFAOYSA-N
- SMILES: CCCCC(CC)COP(=O)(OC1=CC=CC=C1)OC2=CC=CC=C2

Properties
Chemical formula	C_{20}H_{27}O_{4}P
Molar mass	362.406 g·mol^{−1}
Melting point	−60 °C (−76 °F; 213 K)
Boiling point	196 °C (385 °F; 469 K)

Hazards
- GHS labelling
Pictograms	(GHS09: Environmental hazard)
Signal word	Warning
Hazard statements	H410
Precautionary statements	P273, P391, P501
- Except where otherwise noted, data are given for materials in their standard state (at 25 °C [77 °F], 100 kPa). Infobox references

2-Ethylhexyl diphenyl phosphate (Octicizer) is an organophosphate compound. It acts as both a plasticizer and flame retardant in PVC, its wide liquid range also makes it suitable as a flame retardant in hydraulic fluids. It has low acute toxicity in feeding experiments, but has been implicated as a potential hormone mimetic.
