= Pirimiphos-methyl =

Names
- Preferred IUPAC name O-[2-(Diethylamino)-6-methylpyrimidin-4-yl] O,O-dimethyl phosphorothioate
- Other names Pirimifos-methyl

Identifiers
CAS Number	29232-93-7
3D model (JSmol)	Interactive image
Beilstein Reference	755726
ChEBI	CHEBI:38843
ChemSpider	31773
ECHA InfoCard	100.045.011
EC Number	249-528-5
KEGG	C18403
PubChem CID	34526
UNII	2VQZ4PK548
UN number	3082 2902
CompTox Dashboard (EPA)	DTXSID0024266
- InChI: InChI=1S/C11H20N3O3PS/c1-6-14(7-2)11-12-9(3)8-10(13-11)17-18(19,15-4)16-5/h8H,6-7H2,1-5H3 Key: QHOQHJPRIBSPCY-UHFFFAOYSA-N; InChI=1/C11H20N3O3PS/c1-6-14(7-2)11-12-9(3)8-10(13-11)17-18(19,15-4)16-5/h8H,6-7H2,1-5H3 Key: QHOQHJPRIBSPCY-UHFFFAOYAW
- SMILES: CCN(CC)c1nc(C)cc(OP(=S)(OC)OC)n1

Properties
Chemical formula	C_{11}H_{20}N_{3}O_{3}PS
Molar mass	305.33 g·mol^{−1}
Appearance	Straw-colored liquid
Density	1.147 g/mL (30 °C)
Melting point	15 to 18 °C (59 to 64 °F; 288 to 291 K)
Boiling point	decomposes before boiling
Solubility in water	5.0 mg/L (30 °C)

Hazards
- GHS labelling
Pictograms	(GHS07: Exclamation mark) (GHS09: Environmental hazard)
Signal word	Warning
Hazard statements	H302, H410
Precautionary statements	P264, P270, P273, P301+P312, P330, P391, P501
Flash point	46 °C (115 °F; 319 K)
- Except where otherwise noted, data are given for materials in their standard state (at 25 °C [77 °F], 100 kPa). Infobox references

Pirimiphos-methyl, marketed as Actellic and Sybol, is a phosphorothioate used as an insecticide. It was originally developed by Imperial Chemical Industries Ltd., now Syngenta, at their Jealott's Hill site and first marketed in 1977, ten years after its discovery.

This is one of several compounds used for vector control of Triatoma. These insects are implicated in the transmission of Chagas disease in the Americas. Pirimiphos-methyl can be applied as an interior surface paint additive, in order to achieve a residual pesticide effect.

== Synthesis ==
Pirimiphos methyl is manufactured in a two-step process in which N,N-diethylguanidine is reacted with ethyl acetoacetate to form a pyrimidine ring and its hydroxy group is combined with dimethyl chlorothiophosphate to form the insecticide.

Pyrimiphos-ethyl is a related insecticide in which the methoxy groups are replaced with ethoxy groups.
