= Triphenyl phosphate =

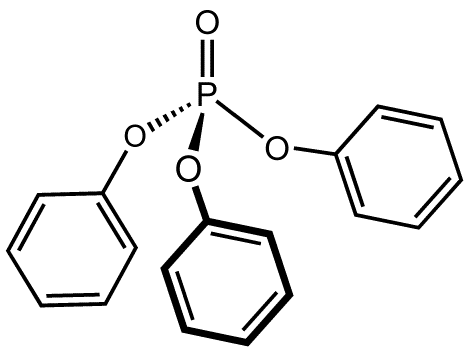

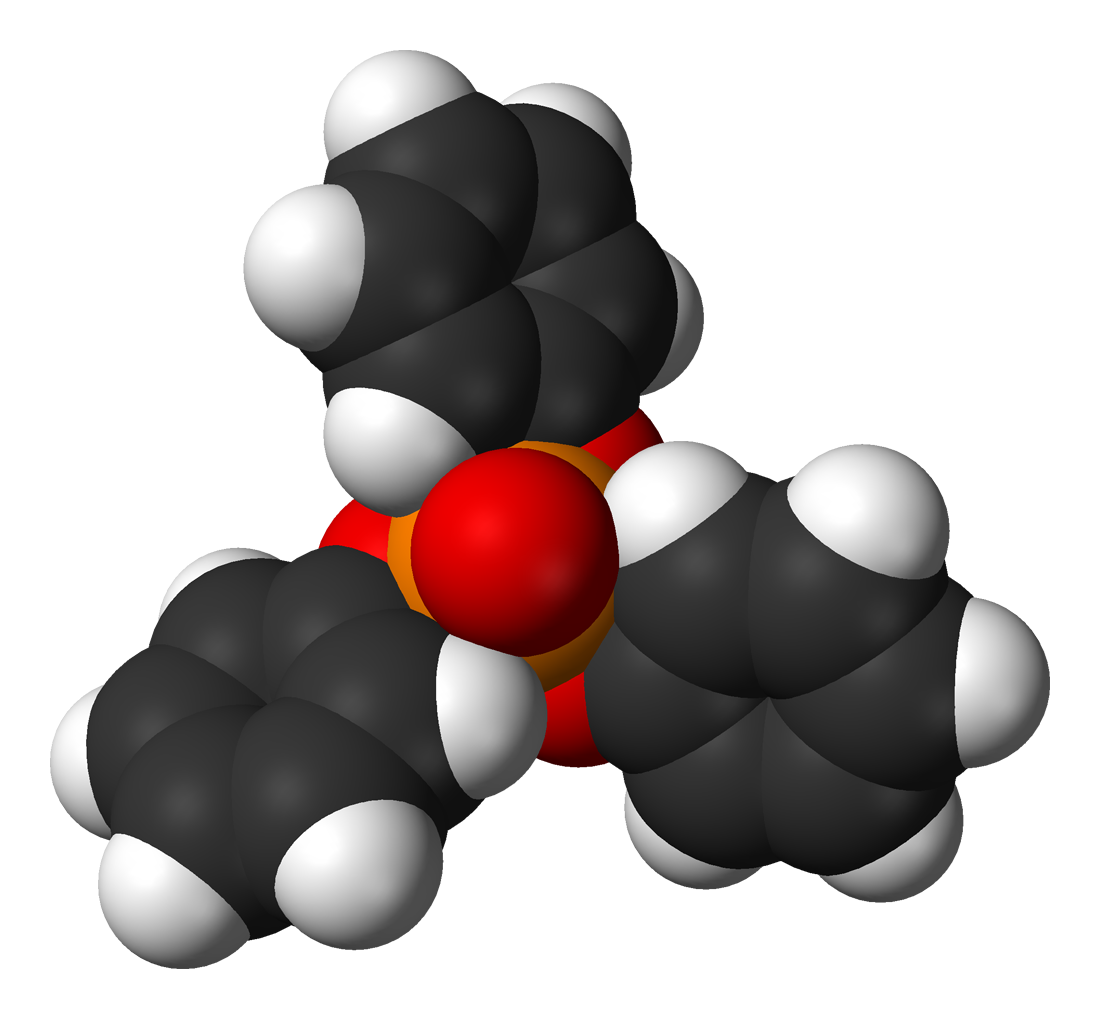

Names
- Preferred IUPAC name Triphenyl phosphate

Identifiers
CAS Number	115-86-6
3D model (JSmol)	Interactive image
ChEBI	CHEBI:35033
ChEMBL	ChEMBL454511
ChemSpider	7988
ECHA InfoCard	100.003.739
PubChem CID	8289
UNII	YZE19Z66EA
CompTox Dashboard (EPA)	DTXSID1021952
- InChI: InChI=1S/C18H15O4P/c19-23(20-16-10-4-1-5-11-16,21-17-12-6-2-7-13-17)22-18-14-8-3-9-15-18/h1-15H Key: XZZNDPSIHUTMOC-UHFFFAOYSA-N; InChI=1/C18H15O4P/c19-23(20-16-10-4-1-5-11-16,21-17-12-6-2-7-13-17)22-18-14-8-3-9-15-18/h1-15H Key: XZZNDPSIHUTMOC-UHFFFAOYAB
- SMILES: O=P(Oc1ccccc1)(Oc2ccccc2)Oc3ccccc3

Properties
Chemical formula	C_{18}H_{15}O_{4}P
Molar mass	326.288 g·mol^{−1}
Appearance	Colorless solid
Density	1.184 g/mL
Melting point	48 to 50 °C (118 to 122 °F; 321 to 323 K)
Boiling point	244 °C (471 °F; 517 K) at 10 mmHg
Vapor pressure	1 mmHg (193 °C)

Hazards
- Occupational safety and health (OHS/OSH)
Main hazards	Harmful
Flash point	220 °C (428 °F; 493 K)
- Lethal dose or concentration (LD, LC)
LD_{50} (median dose)	1320 mg/kg (mouse, oral); 3500 mg/kg (rat, oral)
- NIOSH (US health exposure limits)
PEL (Permissible)	TWA 3 mg/m^{3}
REL (Recommended)	TWA 3 mg/m^{3}
IDLH (Immediate danger)	1000 mg/m^{3}
- Except where otherwise noted, data are given for materials in their standard state (at 25 °C [77 °F], 100 kPa). verify (what is ?) Infobox references

Triphenyl phosphate (TPhP) is the chemical compound with the formula OP(OC_{6}H_{5})_{3}. It is the simplest aromatic organophosphate. This colourless solid is the ester (triester) of phosphoric acid and phenol. It is used as a plasticizer and a fire retardant in a wide variety of settings and products.

== Preparation ==
Triphenyl phosphate is prepared by the SN2 reaction of phosphorus oxychloride and phenol.

== Uses ==
Triphenyl phosphate has been used widely as a flame retardant and plasticizer. It has been used as a flame retardant for a variety of materials, including electronic equipment, PVC, hydraulic fluids, glues, in nail polishes, and casting resins. Its mechanism of action as a flame retardant is as follows: first, during thermal decomposition, phosphoric acid is formed. This reacts to form pyrophosphoric acid, which, when in its condensed phase, acts to block heat transfer. One of the most effective flame retardants for certain polymers, TPhP is only active as an additive flame retardant in its gas phase. Phase out of PBDEs may have increased the use of TPhP in recent years.

TPhP is also used as a plasticizer in lacquers, varnishes, and hydraulic fluids. Nail polish has received particular interest as a source of exposure to TPhP.

== Toxicology ==
Limited information is available indicating significant toxicological effects of TPhP. Although it was initially expected to have an overall low impact, a growing body of evidence suggests that the effects may not be so harmless. Triphenyl phosphate exhibits low acute toxicity by dermal or oral contact. However, an increasing number of studies have linked exposure to TPhP with reproductive and developmental toxicity, neurotoxicity, metabolic disruption, endocrine effects, and genotoxicity. TPhP has also been found to induce significant estrogenic activity. One study found that concentrations above the lowest observable effect level have been observed in a variety of other studies in coral grouper, yellow striped goat fish, and freshwater perch. This indicates that TPhP may be present in the environment at high enough concentrations to have harmful ecological effects. The European Chemicals agency considers TPhP to be "very toxic" to aquatic life, with potentially long-lasting effects.

In contrast to many persistent organic pollutants, TPHP has limited affinity for lipids. Still, bioaccumulation of the compound has been found to occur at varying levels in fish, with the strongest patterns showing up based on gender, feeding patterns, and metabolic efficiency. However, the mechanisms explaining why and how TPhP accumulates in this manner are not yet known.

== Environmental transport and transformations ==
Triphenyl phosphate has been detected in the environment. Other triaryl phosphates have been known to enter aquatic environments through volatilization and leaching from plastics, through hydraulic fluid leakages, and, to a lesser degree, through manufacturing processes. TPhP, in particular, has been found to enter the environment through industrial use, as in the manufacturing process, and through indoor use, for example through paints and electronic equipment. As with many other phosphorus-containing flame retardants, TPhP has been found widely in sediment, soil, indoor dust, and air.

Once in water, TPhP has been found to biodegrade relatively quickly under both aerobic and anaerobic conditions, and does not meet criteria for being categorized as persistent. However, although the compound biodegrades easily and does not bioaccumulate, it is readily detected because of the sheer volume that is utilized. In 2014, the United States Environmental Protection Agency added TPhP to its list of Toxic Substance Control Act Work Plan for Chemicals on the basis that the compound has exhibited "acute and chronic aquatic toxicity," "moderate bioaccumulation potential," and "moderate environmental persistence." Still, there is not yet enough information to fully assess the environmental impact of TPhP.
