= Poly(p-phenylene oxide) =

Names
- IUPAC name Poly(oxy-2,6-dimethyl-1,4-phenylene)
- Other names Poly(p-phenylene ether), PPO, PPE

Identifiers
CAS Number	25134-01-4
ECHA InfoCard	100.110.020
CompTox Dashboard (EPA)	DTXSID2049711

Properties
Chemical formula	(C_{8}H_{8}O)_{n}
- Except where otherwise noted, data are given for materials in their standard state (at 25 °C [77 °F], 100 kPa). Infobox references

Poly(p-phenylene oxide) (PPO), poly(p-phenylene ether) (PPE), poly(oxy-2,6-dimethyl-1,4-phenylene), often referred to simply as polyphenylene oxide, is a high-temperature thermoplastic with the general formula (C_{8}H_{8}O)_{n}. It is rarely used in its pure form due to difficulties in processing. It is mainly used as blend with polystyrene, high impact styrene-butadiene copolymer or polyamide. PPO is a registered trademark of SABIC Innovative Plastics B.V. under which various polyphenylene ether resins are sold.

== History ==
Polyphenylene ether was discovered in 1959 by Allan Hay, and was commercialized by General Electric in 1960.

While it was one of the cheapest high-temperature resistant plastics, processing was difficult, while the impact and heat resistance gradually decreased with time. Mixing it with polystyrene in any ratio could compensate for the disadvantages. In the 1960s, modified PPE came into the market under the trademark Noryl.

== Properties ==
PPE is an amorphous high-performance plastic. The glass transition temperature is 215 °C, but it can be varied by mixing with polystyrene. Through modification and the incorporation of fillers such as glass fibers, the properties can be extensively modified.

== Applications ==
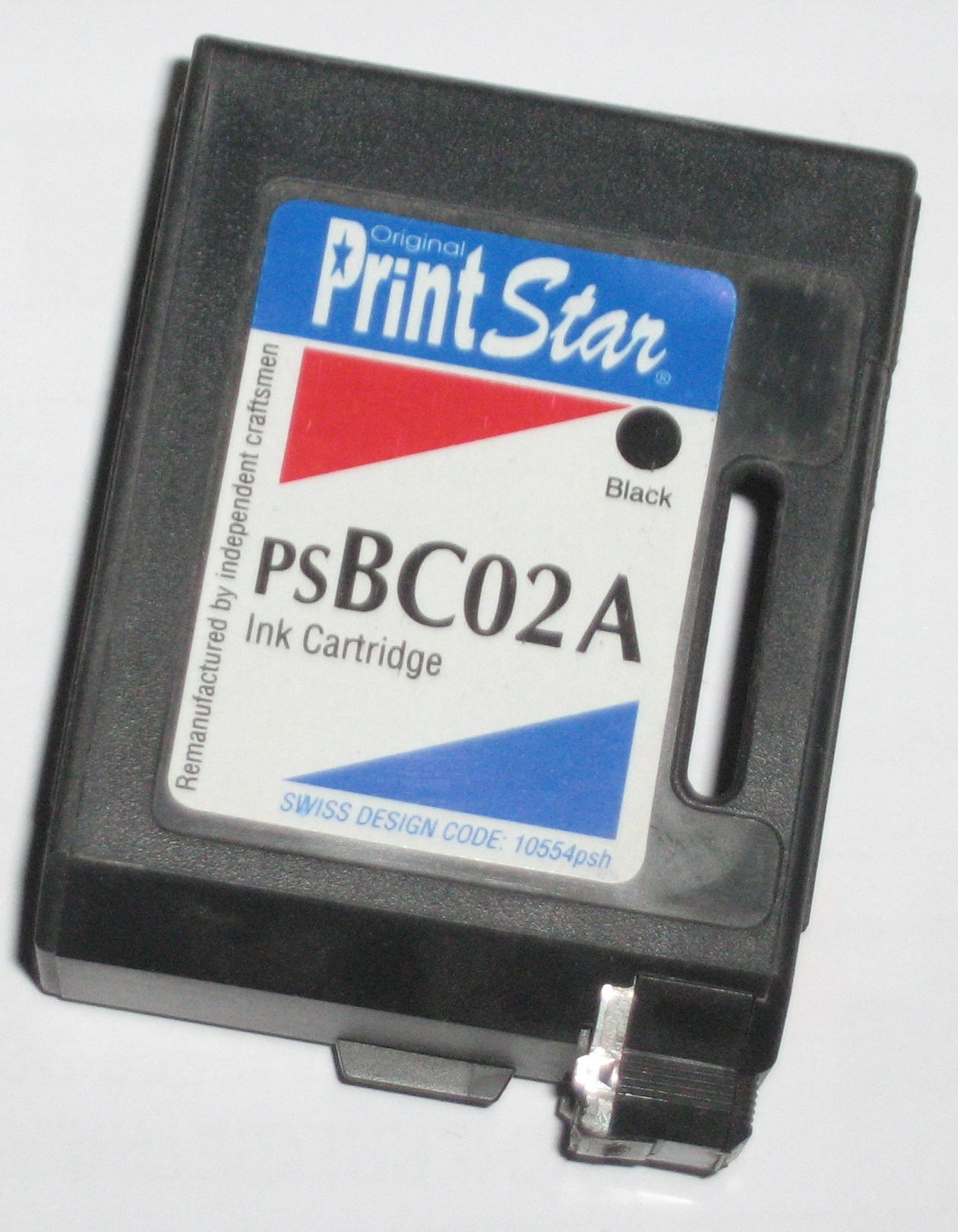
A printer cartridge made of PPE and polystyrene; it is an example of a product which requires good dimensional stability and accuracy to fit.

PPE blends are used for structural parts, electronics, household and automotive items that depend on high heat resistance, dimensional stability and accuracy. They are also used in medicine for sterilizable instruments made of plastic. The PPE blends are characterized by hot water resistance with low water absorption, high impact strength, halogen-free fire protection and low density.

This plastic is processed by injection molding or extrusion; depending on the type, the processing temperature is 260–300 °C. The surface can be printed, hot-stamped, painted or metallized. Welds are possible by means of heating element, friction or ultrasonic welding. It can be glued with halogenated solvents or various adhesives.

This plastic is also used to produce air separation membranes for generating nitrogen. The PPO is spun into a hollow fiber membrane with a porous support layer and a very thin outer skin. The permeation of oxygen occurs from inside to out across the thin outer skin with an extremely high flux. Due to the manufacturing process, the fiber has excellent dimensional stability and strength. Unlike hollow fiber membranes made from polysulfone, the aging process of the fiber is relatively quick so that air separation performance remains stable throughout the life of the membrane. PPO makes the air separation performance suitable for low temperature (35–70 °F, 2–21 °C) applications where polysulfone membranes require heated air to increase permeation.

== Production from natural products ==
Natural phenols can be enzymatically polymerized. Laccase and peroxidase induce the polymerization of syringic acid to give a poly(1,4-phenylene oxide) bearing a carboxylic acid at one end and a phenolic hydroxyl group at the other.
