= Noryl =

Family of modified resins (polyphenylenes with polystyrene)

The Noryl family of modified resins consists of amorphous blends of polyphenylene oxides (PPO) or polyphenylene ether (PPE) resins with polystyrene. They combine the inherent benefits of PPE resin (affordable high heat resistance, good electrical insulation properties, excellent hydrolytic stability and the ability to use non-halogen fire retardant packages), with excellent dimensional stability, good processability and low density.

They were originally developed in 1966 by General Electric Plastics (now owned by SABIC). NORYL is a registered trademark of SABIC Innovative Plastics IP B.V.

Noryl resins are a rare example of a homogeneous mixture of two polymers. Most polymers are incompatible with one another, so tend to produce separate phases when mixed. The two polymers compatibility in Noryl resins is due to the presence of a benzene ring in the repeat units of both chains.

== Properties ==
The addition of polystyrene to PPE increases the glass transition temperature above 100 °C (212 °F), owing to the high T_{g} of PPE, so Noryl resin is stable in boiling water. The precise value of the transition depends on the exact composition of the grade used. There is a smooth linear relation between weight content of polystyrene and the T_{g} of the blend. Due to its good electrical resistance, it is widely used in switch boxes. However, product design is important in maximising the strength of the product, especially in eliminating sharp corners and other stress concentrations. Injection molding must ensure that moldings are stress-free.

Like most other amorphous thermoplastics, Noryl is sensitive to environmental stress cracking when in contact with many organic liquids. Compounds such as gasoline, kerosene, and methylene chloride may initiate brittle cracks resulting in product failure.

== Applications ==
Noryl resins offer a good balance of mechanical and chemical properties, and may be suitable for a wide variety of applications such as in electronics, electrical equipment, coating, machinery, etc.

One of the most famous applications of Noryl was the molded case of the original Apple II computer. At that point, the product was referred to internally at Apple (1978) as "GE NORYL". A famous picture of an Apple II was made after a fire almost completely melted the Noryl case, but the motherboard, when removed from the case, was found to still operate.

Noryl resins have possible applications in the production of hydrogen, where it could serve as cost-effective electrodes in an electrolyzer, replacing expensive rare elements. It is highly resistant against the alkaline potassium hydroxide. For conductivity, the plastic is sprayed with a nickel-based catalyst.

Noryl resins are being investigated as a possible replacement for polycarbonate used in the manufacturing of Blu-ray Discs.

It is also used in certain construction products, like water pumps for swimming pools.

== See also ==
- Hydrogen economy
- Thermoplastic
