= Tris(2-chloroethyl) phosphate =

Names
- Preferred IUPAC name Tris(2-chloroethyl) phosphate
- Other names 2-Chloroethanol phosphate; Tris(β-chloroethyl) phosphate; Tri(2-chloroethyl) phosphate; Tris(2-chloroethyl) orthophosphate; TCEP

Identifiers
CAS Number	115-96-8
3D model (JSmol)	Interactive image
ChemSpider	7994
ECHA InfoCard	100.003.744
PubChem CID	8295
UNII	32IVO568B0
CompTox Dashboard (EPA)	DTXSID5021411
- InChI: InChI=1S/C6H12Cl3O4P/c7-1-4-11-14(10,12-5-2-8)13-6-3-9/h1-6H2 Key: HQUQLFOMPYWACS-UHFFFAOYSA-N; InChI=1/C6H12Cl3O4P/c7-1-4-11-14(10,12-5-2-8)13-6-3-9/h1-6H2 Key: HQUQLFOMPYWACS-UHFFFAOYAR
- SMILES: ClCCOP(=O)(OCCCl)OCCCl

Properties
Chemical formula	C_{6}H_{12}Cl_{3}O_{4}P
Molar mass	285.48 g·mol^{−1}
Density	1.39 g/mL
Boiling point	192 °C (378 °F; 465 K) 10 mmHg

Hazards
- GHS labelling
Pictograms	(GHS07: Exclamation mark) (GHS08: Health hazard) (GHS09: Environmental hazard)
Signal word	Danger
Hazard statements	H302, H351, H360, H411
Precautionary statements	P201, P202, P270, P273, P301+P312, P308+P313, P391
- Except where otherwise noted, data are given for materials in their standard state (at 25 °C [77 °F], 100 kPa). Infobox references

Tris(2-chloroethyl) phosphate (TCEP) is a chemical compound used as a flame retardant, plasticizer, and viscosity regulator in various types of polymers including polyurethanes, polyester resins, and polyacrylates.

== Safety ==
Because of its suspected reproductive toxicity, it is listed as a substance of very high concern under the European Union's REACH regulations. Its use has been largely replaced by tris(chloropropyl) phosphate, which has, however, been found to have similar toxic effects.

== See also ==
- Tris(2,3-dibromopropyl) phosphate
