= Tris(chloropropyl) phosphate =

Names
- IUPAC name Tris(2-chloro-1-methylethyl) phosphate
- Other names: Tris(1-chloro-2-propyl)phosphate; Tris(2-chloroisopropyl)phosphate; Tris(monochloroisopropyl) phosphate (TMCP); Tris(2-chloroisopropyl) phosphate (TCIP)

Identifiers
| CAS Number | 13674-84-5 |
| 3D model (JSmol) | Interactive image |
| ChEBI | CHEBI:143728 |
| ChEMBL | ChEMBL3188873 |
| ChemSpider | 24387 |
| ECHA InfoCard | 100.033.766 |
| EC Number | 237-158-7 |
| PubChem CID | 26176 |
| UNII | CRT22GFY70 |
| CompTox Dashboard (EPA) | DTXSID5026259 |
- InChI: InChI=1S/C9H18Cl3O4P/c1-7(4-10)14-17(13,15-8(2)5-11)16-9(3)6-12/h7-9H,4-6H2,1-3H3 Key: KVMPUXDNESXNOH-UHFFFAOYSA-N
- SMILES: O=P(OC(CCl)C)(OC(CCl)C)OC(CCl)C

Properties
| Chemical formula | C_{9}H_{18}Cl_{3}O_{4}P |
| Molar mass | 327.56 g·mol^{−1} |
| Appearance | Liquid |
| Melting point | 20 °C (68 °F; 293 K) |
| Boiling point | 290 °C (554 °F; 563 K) decomposes |
| Solubility in water | 1,080 mg/l at 20°C |

Hazards
- GHS labelling
| Pictograms | (GHS07: Exclamation mark) |
| Signal word | Warning |
| Hazard statements | H302 |
| Precautionary statements | P264, P270, P301+P312, P330 |
- Except where otherwise noted, data are given for materials in their standard state (at 25 °C [77 °F], 100 kPa). Infobox references

Tris(chloropropyl) phosphate (commonly abbreviated TCPP) is a chlorinated organophosphate flame retardant commonly added to polyurethane foams. Comparatively minor amounts are used in PVC and EVA.

== Synthesis ==
TCPP is prepared industrially by the reaction of propylene oxide with phosphoryl chloride. In practise this produces a range of products, of which the tris(2-chloro-1-methylethyl) isomer tends to dominate (50-85% w/w).
