= Bis(2-ethylhexyl)tetrabromophthalate =

- Bis(2-ethylhexyl)tetrabromophthalate Structure without stereochemistry.

Names
- Preferred IUPAC name bis(2-ethylhexyl) 3,4,5,6-tetrabromobenzene-1,2-dicarboxylate
- Other names TBPH; BEH-TEBP; 1,2-Benzenedicarboxylic acid, 3,4,5,6-tetrabromo-, 1,2-bis(2-ethylhexyl) ester Phthalic acid, tetrabromo-, bis(2-ethylhexyl) ester 1,2-Benzenedicarboxylic acid, 3,4,5,6-tetrabromo-, bis(2-ethylhexyl) ester Di(2-ethylhexyl) tetrabromophthalate DP 45; Bis(2-ethylhexyl) tetrabromophthalate Pyronil 45; Uniplex FRP 45; Bis(2-ethylhexyl) 2,3,4,5-Tetrabromophthalate; Bis(2-ethylhexyl) 3,4,5,6-tetrabromophthalate FRP 45; Bis(2-ethyl-1-hexyl) tetrabromophthalate BEHTBP

Identifiers
CAS Number	26040-51-7; 118817-35-9 (Deleted); 119418-65-4 (Deleted)
3D model (JSmol)	Interactive image
ChEMBL	ChEMBL3188536
ChemSpider	104816
ECHA InfoCard	100.043.099
EC Number	247-426-5
PubChem CID	117291
UNII	413M0N3V1G
CompTox Dashboard (EPA)	DTXSID7027887
- InChI: InChI=1S/C24H34Br4O4/c1-5-9-11-15(7-3)13-31-23(29)17-18(20(26)22(28)21(27)19(17)25)24(30)32-14-16(8-4)12-10-6-2/h15-16H,5-14H2,1-4H3 Key: UUEDINPOVKWVAZ-UHFFFAOYSA-N
- SMILES: CCCCC(CC)COC(=O)C1=C(C(=C(C(=C1Br)Br)Br)Br)C(=O)OCC(CC)CCCC

Properties
Chemical formula	C_{24}H_{34}Br_{4}O_{4}
Molar mass	706.148 g·mol^{−1}
Appearance	colourless or yellow oil
Density	1.541 g/mL (20°C)
Melting point	−27 °C (−17 °F; 246 K)
Boiling point	584.79 °C (1,084.62 °F; 857.94 K)
Solubility in water	6.2 x 10-2 ng/L
log P	10.2 (P_{OW})
Vapor pressure	3.56x10^-7 Pa

Hazards
- Occupational safety and health (OHS/OSH)
Main hazards	Irritant
- GHS labelling
Pictograms	(GHS07: Exclamation mark)
Signal word	Warning
Hazard statements	H319
Precautionary statements	P264+P265, P280, P305+P351+P338, P337+P317
NFPA 704 (fire diamond)	0 1 0
Flash point	207 °C (405 °F; 480 K)
Autoignition temperature	270 °C (518 °F; 543 K)
- Except where otherwise noted, data are given for materials in their standard state (at 25 °C [77 °F], 100 kPa). Infobox references

Bis(2-ethylhexyl)tetrabromophthalate (or TBPH), is a brominated phthalate derivative with the formula C_{24}H_{34}Br_{4}O_{4} commonly used as a brominated flame retardant (BFR).

== Structure ==
Structure of the three stereoisomers of TBPH.

TBPH is the diester of tetrabromophthalic acid and (racemic) 2-ethylhexanol. It has two stereocenters, located at the carbon atoms carrying the ethyl groups. As a result, it has three distinct stereoisomers, consisting of an (R,R) form, an (S,S) form (diastereomers), and a meso (R,S) form.

TBPH is the brominated analogue of bis(2-ethylhexyl) phthalate (DEHP). Much like TBPH, DEHP has been widely used as a plasticizer, however unlike TBPH, it is currently a restricted substance due to its endocrine disrupting properties and reproductive toxicity. Although the structural similarity to DEHP raises some concern for toxicity of TBPH, bromination alters the physical and chemical properties of DEHP.

Additionally, TBPH shares many similar structural characteristics (e.g., aromatic rings, bromination) with a class of BFRs called polybrominated diphenyl ethers (PBDEs) which has faced a great deal of attention and numerous restrictions due to their persistence, bioaccumulation, and potential toxicity. These structural similarities have brought up concerns that it may behave similarly to PBDEs in the environment.

== Reactivity ==
It is reportedly stable under normal conditions of handling and use. Thermal decomposition may produce hydrogen bromide and/or bromine and carbon oxides such as carbon monoxide and carbon dioxide. Additionally, halogenated compounds with aromatic rings (such as TBHF) can degrade into dioxins and dioxin-like compounds, particularly when heated. Their halogenated-counterparts, chlorinated dioxins, are among the highly toxic compounds listed by the Stockholm Convention on Persistent Organic Pollutants.

In laboratory conditions, TBPH has been shown to undergo photolytic degradation in solvents when exposed to UV radiation, likely via sequential reductive debromination. Furthermore, the dominant products of this degradation are di- and tribrominated analogues of TBPH (most of which were also missing both alkane branches).

Although no specific structures for these degradation products have been confirmed, this breakdown pattern remains of some concern. As a general rule, PDBEs with higher numbers of bromine atoms, such as decaBDE, are less toxic than PBDEs with lower numbers of bromine atoms, such as pentaBDE. However, as higher-order PBDEs degrade, bromine atoms are removed, resulting in more toxic PBDE congeners. The lower brominated PBDE congeners formed as a result of debromination are generally more persistent, bioaccumulative, and toxic.

Reductive debromination could produce TBPH’s debrominated analogue DEHP, a common plasticizer. However, this has not been confirmed.

Although this indicates that TBPH can be photolytically degraded, the process is slower than for other PBDEs, such as decaBDE or nonaBDEs. This suggests that TBPH may be more persistent, at least photolytically, than higher brominated PBDEs congeners in the environment. This is supported by its very low vapour pressure, which suggests photolysis in the atmosphere is not considered to be a relevant degradation pathway.

== Synthesis ==
TBPH is synthesized by a process known as the Wittig reaction, involving the reaction of an aldehyde or ketone with an organophosphorus compound to form an alkene. Specifically, TBPH is produced by the reaction of tetrabromophthalic anhydride with racemic 2-ethylhexanol in the presence of titanium isopropoxide catalyst via a general synthesis method widely applied to the technical field of flame retardant synthesis.

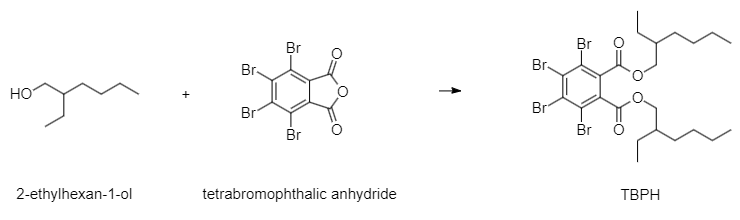
Synthesis of bis(2-ethylhexyl)-tetrabromophthalate (TBPH) from tetrabromophthalic anhydride and 2-ethylhexanol.

In this general synthesis method, tetrabromophthalic anhydride and 2-ethylhexanol are used as raw materials in a molar mass ratio of 3-7:1. Nitrogen is introduced as an inert protective gas, and the direct diesterification of tetrabromophthalic anhydride is achieved by using an organic base (preferably ammonia water, triethylamine, di-n-butylamine or ethylenediamine) as a neutralizing agent to remove the residual sulfuric acid in the system, with titanium tetrachloride as a catalyst. The reaction proceeds at 200-230 °C under reflux to rapidly separate the water formed during the reaction. The catalyst is removed by pickling, and the solvent distilled under reduced pressure to obtain a crude product.

Decolorization and impurity removal is achieved by adding hydrogen peroxide; a composite decolorizer consisting of activated carbon, diatomaceous earth and adsorption resin; and a diluent such as methanol, ethanol, n-propanol, isopropanol or n-butanol. After removing the composite by filtration, the light-colored product TBPH is obtained by distilling off the diluent.

== Use ==
As an additive, TBPH improves the flame retardancy of plastics, and acts as a flow promoter, which improves the molding properties of plastic formulations, and facilitates the processing of plastics without other adverse side effects. As such, it is widely used as a fire retardant and plasticizer in a variety of thermoplastic and thermosetting plastics, such as HIPS, ABS, PU, epoxy, PVC, modified PPO, PC, Polybutylene terephthalate and unsaturated polyester for use in wire and cable insulation, film and sheeting, carpet backing, coated fabrics, wall coverings and adhesives.

As opposed to reactive components, which are bound to a polymer material by a chemical reaction when the material is being created, additives are blended with or coated on materials to make them flame resistant. As a result, additives are not chemically bonded to the base material and leach out more easily.

In addition to its use as a flame retardant, it is reportedly also used as a broad-spectrum synthetic pyrethroid insecticide under the name Pyronil 45-d34. It is effective against a variety of insect pests, including mosquitoes, flies, fleas, and ticks. However, its use as an insecticide is under-reported, and limited to a mention by the American Chemical Supplier BenchChem.

== History ==
TBPH was first introduced to the market as a brominated component of the commercial fire retardant mixtures Firemaster 550 (FM 550), BZ 54, and DP-45, all of which are manufactured by Chemtura Corp (West Lafayette, IN). The mixture which would eventually become known as FM 550, was first reported to the USEPA in 1995 by Chemtura. In 1997, Chemtura entered into a Consent Order with USEPA allowing the introduction into commerce.

At the time, it was presented as a less persistent and less likely to bioaccumulate alternative to pentaBDE, a commercial PBDE mixture which would later be banned in Europe, and voluntarily phased out in the United States in 2004. Despite the phaseout, between 2001 and 2008, the production volume of brominated flame retardants worldwide doubled from approximately 200,000 to 410,000 metric tons (mt) annually. In the absence of exact sales numbers for FM 550, a 2011 study would find the mixture as the second most commonly detected flame retardant in polyurethane foam used and sold in the United States.

Contrary to public declarations made by USEPA officials in 2003, documents obtained by the Chicago Tribune showed that scientists within the agency were deeply skeptical about the safety of FM 550. Due to its use as an additive (as opposed to a reactive, e.g. covalently bound), as well as similarities in structure and properties to PBDEs, environmental fates similar to PentaBDE were expected. Owing to these concerns, Chemtura entered into a modified Consent Order with USEPA in 2008, which required further testing of FM 550.

In the meantime, the contents of the mixture remained unknown to the wider scientific community until 2008, when a study by Stapleton et al. found two new chemicals with high levels of bromine while analyzing dust samples from homes in Boston. Stapleton analyzed the substance and confirmed the presence of four different components: triphenyl phosphate (TPP); a mixture of isopropylated triphenyl phosphate isomers (ITPs); 2-ethylhexyl-2,3,4,5-tertrabromobenzoate (TBB); and bis(2-ethylhexyl) tetrabromophthalate (TBPH), in the FM 550 mixture as well as the dust samples.

By 2012, studies measuring flame retardant levels in the environment had detected both TBB and TBPH in indoor dust, outdoor air, marine mammal tissues, and wastewater sewage sludge, suggesting that, like some of their pentaBDE predecessors, these chemicals were indeed leaching from treated products and entering the environment.

The year 2015 saw re-assessments of the chemical in both the United States as the European Union. In the United States, the USEPA assessed a group of seven brominated phthalates, including TBPH, for problem formulation and data needs assessment. However, it was concluded that the available data on the toxicological hazard of these chemicals is incomplete for risk assessment. At the same time, a testing proposal evaluation was performed in the European Union, which resulted in a request for a prenatal developmental toxicity study. A compliance check (the testing of products manufactured, imported or retailed in the European Union against REACH Regulation) was performed in 2016 with requests for further study, which were provided, and accepted by ECHA. In line with this investigation, the registration of TBPH was updated with assessments of the potential endocrine disrupting properties of the substance for the environment and human health.

Following the compliance check, TBPH was included in a Community Rolling Action Plan (CoRAP) for evaluation in March 2019 by the Swedish Chemicals Agency (KEMI) in order to clarify concerns related to wide dispersive use; exposure of environment; potential endocrine disrupting; and persistence, bioaccumulation and toxicity (PBT) or very persistent and very bioaccumulative (vPvB) properties. The evaluation confirmed suspected vPvB properties, leading to its inclusion on ECHA’s PBT assessment list. Following the confirmation of vPvB properties, KEMI considered it appropriate to prepare and submit a substance of very high concern (SVHC) dossier.

On January 17, 2023, TBPH made it onto the Candidate List of SVHCs, which is the first step for follow-up regulatory action at the EU level.

== Effects on living organisms ==
=== Toxicity ===
In vitro mutagenicity tests have shown that TBPH can induce chromosomal aberrations, but does not give rise to point mutations. It is suspected that TBPH is not genotoxic in vivo. Although carcinogenicity tests have not been assessed for TBPH, (Q)SAR predictions did show that TBPH, belonging to the phthalates/benzoate group, has positive indications for being carcinogenic. Sub-acute and sub-chronic toxicity tests have demonstrated that TBPH causes minimal toxicity and no treatment-related effects, respectively. The no-observed-adverse-effect level (NOAEL) of a mixture containing TBPH is 50 mg/kg/day. TBPH is classified as GHS hazard statement H319, so it can lead to serious eye irritation. According to the Registration, Evaluation, Authorisation and Restriction of Chemicals (REACH) Annex XIII criteria, TBPH is a very persistent and very bio-accumulative (vPvB) compound.

Even though TBPH is poorly absorbed and metabolised, and rapidly eliminated unchanged via faeces, studies have shown that it still has potential to accumulate in adrenal and liver tissue. Additionally, accumulation of a Firemaster 550, a mixture containing TBPH, was observed in placentas of rats. TBPH acted as an antagonist in a yeast estrogen/androgen screening assays (YES and YAS assays), suggesting it may affect reproduction. However, the potential of TBPH to cause reproductive or developmental problems has only been studied using TBPH in a mixture with other fire retardants and is therefore inconclusive.

=== Endocrine disruption ===
DEHP is the non-brominated version of TBPH and currently a restricted substance because it is an endocrine disruptor for human health and environment. It has been shown that DEHP can affect reproduction and development. TBPH is a potential endocrine disruptor due to the similarity between TBPH and DEHP. However, there is limited evidence TBPH gets debrominated or metabolised to DEHP in vivo.

Studies using human vascular endothelial cells (HUVECs) demonstrated that the TBPH metabolite TBMEHP is more toxic than TBPH itself, since it inhibited cell growth, and induced cell cycle arrest and apoptosis. Still, the metabolism of DEHP to its toxic metabolite (MEHP) is approximately 100 times faster than the metabolism of TBPH to TBMEHP.

Data on Firemaster 550 observed weight gain, reduced liver enzyme activity, and thyroid hormone axis disruption upon exposure. Since this is a mixture containing TBPH and other fire retardants, it remains unclear what components have the endocrine disrupting potential. Although in vitro data provides indications that TBPH may have endocrine disrupting properties, in vivo data cannot confirm this.
