= J-Wear =

Clothing line for astronauts

J-Wear is a line of clothing designed for use by astronauts during space missions. It includes underwear, shirts, pants and socks. The clothing is anti-bacterial, water-absorbent, odor-eliminating, antistatic, and flame retardant. It is made from cotton and polyester, and is seamless.

The clothes were designed by textile experts at the Women’s University in Tokyo.
