= Decabromodiphenyl ethane =

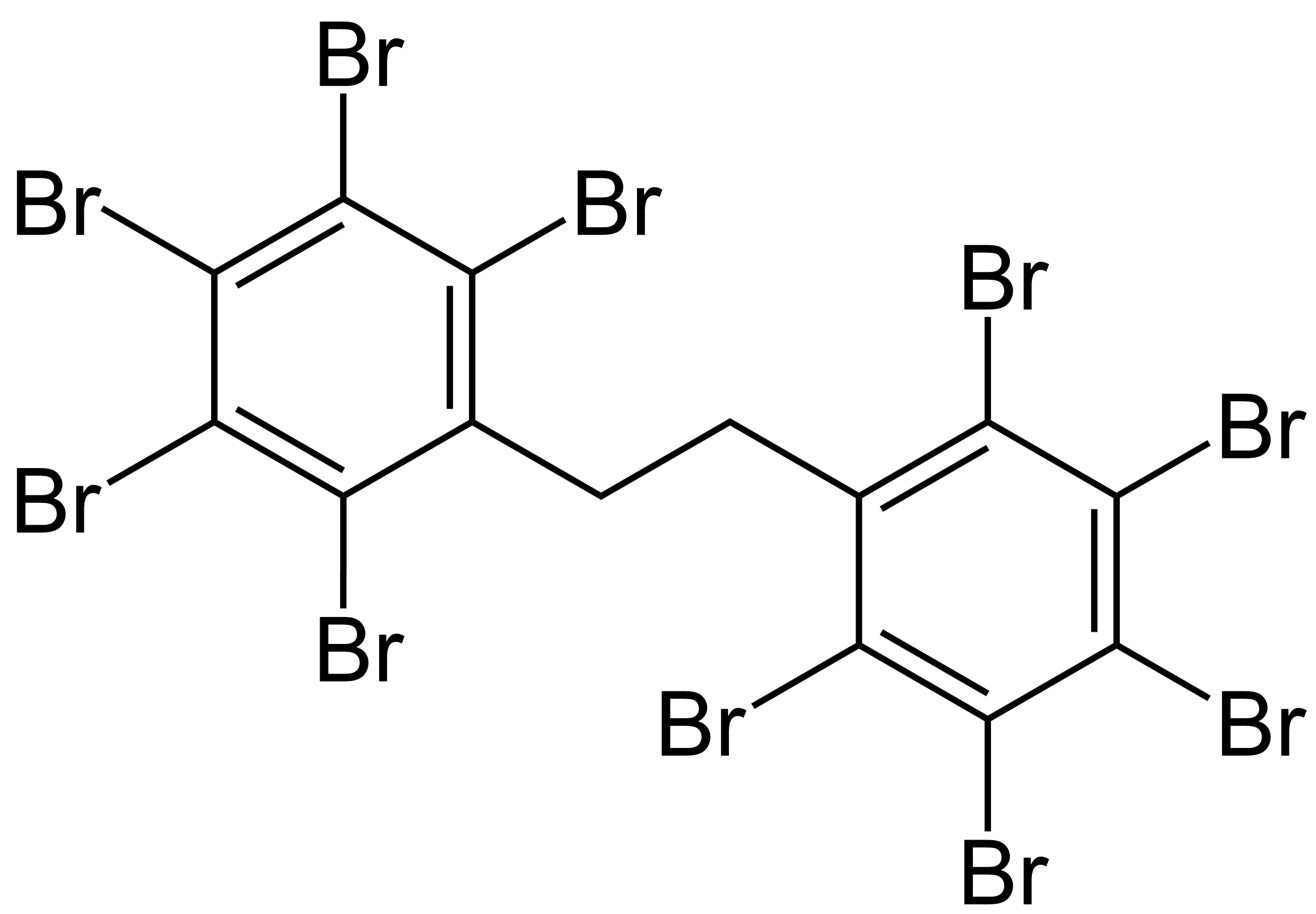

Names
- IUPAC name 1,1'-ethane-1,2-diylbis(pentabromobenzene)
- Other names: 1,2-Bis(perbromophenyl)ethane; 1,2-Bis(2,3,4,5,6-pentabromophenyl)ethane; 1,2,3,4,5-pentabromo-6-[2-(2,3,4,5,6-pentabromophenyl)ethyl]benzene

Identifiers
CAS Number	84852-53-9
3D model (JSmol)	Interactive image
ChEMBL	ChEMBL219257
ChemSpider	9161088
ECHA InfoCard	100.076.669
EC Number	284-366-9
PubChem CID	10985889
UNII	WZ2532TA0A
CompTox Dashboard (EPA)	DTXSID2052732
- InChI: Key: BZQKBFHEWDPQHD-UHFFFAOYSA-N; InChI=1S/C14H4Br10/c15-5-3(6(16)10(20)13(23)9(5)19)1-2-4-7(17)11(21)14(24)12(22)8(4)18/h1-2H2
- SMILES: C(CC1=C(C(=C(C(=C1Br)Br)Br)Br)Br)C2=C(C(=C(C(=C2Br)Br)Br)Br)Br

Properties
Chemical formula	C_{14}H_{4}Br_{10}
Molar mass	971.226 g·mol^{−1}
Appearance	White solid
- Except where otherwise noted, data are given for materials in their standard state (at 25 °C [77 °F], 100 kPa). Infobox references

Decabromodiphenyl ethane is a chemical compound used as a brominated flame retardant. It was commercialised in the 1990s as an alternative for decabromodiphenyl ether, following safety concern over that compound. The two molecules are chemically very similar, which gives them a similar application profile. Decabromodiphenyl ethane is now also coming under regulatory pressure.

== Uses ==
Decabromodiphenylethane is used as a flame retardant in a wide variety of materials including high-impact polystyrene (HIPS), acrylonitrile butadiene styrene (ABS), polyolefins and elastomers. Antimony trioxide is often included as a synergist. Its use in epoxy resins (used for circuit boards), HIPS and ABS (casings), wire and cable means that it is common in electronic devices. The amount manufactured in China between 2006 and 2016 was 230,000 tons, of which 39,000 tons were exported from China in electrical appliances. Under the REACH Regulation, it is registered for the manufacture in and/or the import to the European Economic Area in the tonnage band between 10 000 and 100 000 tonnes per year. In e-waste, an average concentration of 340±200 ppm was found in a study conducted in 2011, confirming the widespread occurrence of the chemical in electronic equipment.

== Environmental occurrence ==
Decabromodiphenylethane was first detected in the environment in 2004. It has been found in biota, air, sediments, sewage sludge, and house dust.
