= Polybrominated diphenyl ethers =

Class of chemicals

- Chemical structure of PBDEs

Identifiers
CAS Number	90193-67-2
ECHA InfoCard	100.082.305
CompTox Dashboard (EPA)	DTXSID70107595

Properties
Chemical formula	C_{12}H_{10−x}Br_{x}O
Molar mass	Variable
- Except where otherwise noted, data are given for materials in their standard state (at 25 °C [77 °F], 100 kPa). Infobox references

Polybrominated diphenyl ethers or PBDEs, are a class of organobromine compounds that have been used as flame retardants. Like other brominated flame retardants, PBDEs have been used in a wide array of products, including building materials, electronics, furnishings, motor vehicles, airplanes, plastics, polyurethane foams, and textiles. They are structurally akin to polychlorinated diphenyl ethers (PCDEs), polychlorinated biphenyls (PCBs) and other polyhalogenated compounds, consisting of two halogenated aromatic rings. PBDEs are classified according to the average number of bromine atoms in the molecule. The life-saving benefits of fire retardants led to their popularization. Standards for mass transit vehicles continues to increase as of 2021.

Because of their toxicity and persistence, all commercially relevant PBDEs have been marked for elimination under the Stockholm Convention, a treaty to control and phase out major persistent organic pollutants (POPs).

== Classes of PBDEs ==
The family of PBDEs consists of 209 possible substances, which are called congeners (PBDE = C_{12}H_{(10−x)}Br_{x}O (x = 1, 2, ..., 10 = m + n)). The number of isomers for mono-, di-, tri-, tetra-, penta-, hexa-, hepta-, octa-, nona-, and decabromodiphenyl ethers are 3, 12, 24, 42, 46, 42, 24, 12, 3 and 1, respectively.

Lower-brominated PBDEs with 1–4 bromine atoms per molecule are regarded as more dangerous because they more efficiently bioaccumulate. They have been known to affect thyroid hormone levels, and studies have linked them to reproductive and neurological risks at certain concentrations or higher. Higher-brominated PBDEs are less acutely dangerous but biotically and photochemically debrominate to lower-brominated congeners.

number	formula	name	CAS Number	InChIKey
PBDE-1	C_{12}H_{9}BrO	2-bromodiphenyl ether	36563-47-0	RRWFUWRLNIZICP-UHFFFAOYSA-N
PBDE-2	C_{12}H_{9}BrO	3-bromodiphenyl ether	6876-00-2	AHDAKFFMKLQPTD-UHFFFAOYSA-N
PBDE-3	C_{12}H_{9}BrO	4-bromodiphenyl ether	101-55-3	JDUYPUMQALQRCN-UHFFFAOYSA-N
PBDE-4	C_{12}H_{8}Br_{2}O	2,2'-dibromodiphenyl ether	51452-87-0	JMSKYMHFNWGUJG-UHFFFAOYSA-N
PBDE-5	C_{12}H_{8}Br_{2}O	2,3-dibromodiphenyl ether	446254-14-4	JTYRXXKXOULVAP-UHFFFAOYSA-N
PBDE-6	C_{12}H_{8}Br_{2}O	2,3'-dibromodiphenyl ether	147217-72-9	GODQTPRKFHOLPH-UHFFFAOYSA-N
PBDE-7	C_{12}H_{8}Br_{2}O	2,4-dibromodiphenyl ether	171977-44-9	JMCIHKKTRDLVCO-UHFFFAOYSA-N
PBDE-8	C_{12}H_{8}Br_{2}O	2,4'-dibromodiphenyl ether	147217-71-8	RJQLQJZMLISKRJ-UHFFFAOYSA-N
PBDE-9	C_{12}H_{8}Br_{2}O	2,5-dibromodiphenyl ether	337513-66-3	URDWJMUOJJSXAE-UHFFFAOYSA-N
PBDE-10	C_{12}H_{8}Br_{2}O	2,6-dibromodiphenyl ether	51930-04-2	MUVDKHMQIZJFTC-UHFFFAOYSA-N
PBDE-11	C_{12}H_{8}Br_{2}O	3,3'-dibromodiphenyl ether	6903-63-5	ALSVFJIXSNRBLE-UHFFFAOYSA-N
PBDE-12	C_{12}H_{8}Br_{2}O	3,4-dibromodiphenyl ether	189084-59-1	SUUJFDKVPDCZQZ-UHFFFAOYSA-N
PBDE-13	C_{12}H_{8}Br_{2}O	3,4'-dibromodiphenyl ether	83694-71-7	BGPOVBPKODCMMN-UHFFFAOYSA-N
PBDE-14	C_{12}H_{8}Br_{2}O	3,5-dibromodiphenyl ether	46438-88-4	FOXBZJLXVUHYQZ-UHFFFAOYSA-N
PBDE-15	C_{12}H_{8}Br_{2}O	4,4'-dibromodiphenyl ether	2050-47-7	YAWIAFUBXXPJMQ-UHFFFAOYSA-N
PBDE-16	C_{12}H_{7}Br_{3}O	2,2',3-tribromodiphenyl ether	147217-74-1	VRNGWCVCSHJUEJ-UHFFFAOYSA-N
PBDE-17	C_{12}H_{7}Br_{3}O	2,2',4-tribromodiphenyl ether	147217-75-2	VYBFILXLBMWOLI-UHFFFAOYSA-N
PBDE-18	C_{12}H_{7}Br_{3}O	2,2',5-tribromodiphenyl ether	407606-55-7	FAZLXBWRNJAGSV-UHFFFAOYSA-N
PBDE-19	C_{12}H_{7}Br_{3}O	2,2',6-tribromodiphenyl ether	147217-73-0	YDFQHBRKURQGAH-UHFFFAOYSA-N
PBDE-20	C_{12}H_{7}Br_{3}O	2,3,3'-tribromodiphenyl ether	147217-76-3	RQJUBSPXDSGLRB-UHFFFAOYSA-N
PBDE-21	C_{12}H_{7}Br_{3}O	2,3,4-tribromodiphenyl ether	337513-67-4	RXWRVYYPLRPDOS-UHFFFAOYSA-N
PBDE-22	C_{12}H_{7}Br_{3}O	2,3,4'-tribromodiphenyl ether	446254-15-5	WZHNIFQVNBINLF-UHFFFAOYSA-N
PBDE-23	C_{12}H_{7}Br_{3}O	2,3,5-tribromodiphenyl ether	446254-16-6	XQHLKDAUZRXBGC-UHFFFAOYSA-N
PBDE-24	C_{12}H_{7}Br_{3}O	2,3,6-tribromodiphenyl ether	218304-36-0	GFLRHBRMAZDOIG-UHFFFAOYSA-N
PBDE-25	C_{12}H_{7}Br_{3}O	2,3',4-tribromodiphenyl ether	147217-77-4	AURKEOPYVUYTLO-UHFFFAOYSA-N
PBDE-26	C_{12}H_{7}Br_{3}O	2,3',5-tribromodiphenyl ether	337513-75-4	VUOBKVBAFJQQDB-UHFFFAOYSA-N
PBDE-27	C_{12}H_{7}Br_{3}O	2,3',6-tribromodiphenyl ether	337513-53-8	JUPZALSVNWJHII-UHFFFAOYSA-N
PBDE-28	C_{12}H_{7}Br_{3}O	2,4,4'-tribromodiphenyl ether	41318-75-6	UPNBETHEXPIWQX-UHFFFAOYSA-N
PBDE-29	C_{12}H_{7}Br_{3}O	2,4,5-tribromodiphenyl ether	337513-56-1	LTMKAFUXYKEDLR-UHFFFAOYSA-N
PBDE-30	C_{12}H_{7}Br_{3}O	2,4,6-tribromodiphenyl ether	155999-95-4	TVZAPPGLBLTACB-UHFFFAOYSA-N
PBDE-31	C_{12}H_{7}Br_{3}O	2,4',5-tribromodiphenyl ether	65075-08-3	PURZBWMLFRWRMG-UHFFFAOYSA-N
PBDE-32	C_{12}H_{7}Br_{3}O	2,4',6-tribromodiphenyl ether	189084-60-4	TYDVYKIQSZGUMV-UHFFFAOYSA-N
PBDE-33	C_{12}H_{7}Br_{3}O	2,3',4'-tribromodiphenyl ether	49690-94-0	BUQBQEYUVAKJQK-UHFFFAOYSA-N
PBDE-34	C_{12}H_{7}Br_{3}O	2,3',5'-tribromodiphenyl ether	446254-17-7	XMNXHCHZIPYCNA-UHFFFAOYSA-N
PBDE-35	C_{12}H_{7}Br_{3}O	3,3',4-tribromodiphenyl ether	147217-80-9	CDVYKQPKJYPWRO-UHFFFAOYSA-N
PBDE-36	C_{12}H_{7}Br_{3}O	3,3',5-tribromodiphenyl ether	147217-79-6	XUKPJLVONRTECE-UHFFFAOYSA-N
PBDE-37	C_{12}H_{7}Br_{3}O	3,4,4'-tribromodiphenyl ether	147217-81-0	YALAYFVVZFORPV-UHFFFAOYSA-N
PBDE-38	C_{12}H_{7}Br_{3}O	3,4,5-tribromodiphenyl ether	337513-54-9	DPGVQKLGQZZLMI-UHFFFAOYSA-N
PBDE-39	C_{12}H_{7}Br_{3}O	3,4',5-tribromodiphenyl ether	407606-57-9	UFFNOPDHJNQYKD-UHFFFAOYSA-N
PBDE-40	C_{12}H_{6}Br_{4}O	2,2',3,3'-tetrabromodiphenyl ether	337513-77-6	SXSUUFZWSVMTRL-UHFFFAOYSA-N
PBDE-41	C_{12}H_{6}Br_{4}O	2,2',3,4-tetrabromodiphenyl ether	337513-68-5	UAEBSKBXZAIRMX-UHFFFAOYSA-N
PBDE-42	C_{12}H_{6}Br_{4}O	2,2',3,4'-tetrabromodiphenyl ether	446254-18-8	HQDQKPAHIDGGMH-UHFFFAOYSA-N
PBDE-43	C_{12}H_{6}Br_{4}O	2,2',3,5-tetrabromodiphenyl ether	446254-19-9	LKMQHSYDVDIECC-UHFFFAOYSA-N
PBDE-44	C_{12}H_{6}Br_{4}O	2,2',3,5'-tetrabromodiphenyl ether	446254-20-2	VBGBGTYMDIVKNK-UHFFFAOYSA-N
PBDE-45	C_{12}H_{6}Br_{4}O	2,2',3,6-tetrabromodiphenyl ether	446254-21-3	VTFWUBIOZQCMQS-UHFFFAOYSA-N
PBDE-46	C_{12}H_{6}Br_{4}O	2,2',3,6'-tetrabromodiphenyl ether	446254-22-4	GBUUKJRFSKCMTB-UHFFFAOYSA-N
PBDE-47	C_{12}H_{6}Br_{4}O	2,2',4,4'-tetrabromodiphenyl ether	5436-43-1	XYBSIYMGXVUVGY-UHFFFAOYSA-N
PBDE-48	C_{12}H_{6}Br_{4}O	2,2',4,5-tetrabromodiphenyl ether	337513-55-0	FJGDNHOVDFREMP-UHFFFAOYSA-N
PBDE-49	C_{12}H_{6}Br_{4}O	2,2',4,5'-tetrabromodiphenyl ether	243982-82-3	QWVDUBDYUPHNHY-UHFFFAOYSA-N
PBDE-50	C_{12}H_{6}Br_{4}O	2,2',4,6-tetrabromodiphenyl ether	446254-23-5	FXUAKFRJBKFDSY-UHFFFAOYSA-N
PBDE-51	C_{12}H_{6}Br_{4}O	2,2',4,6'-tetrabromodiphenyl ether	189084-57-9	WKBBBTLDLKYGBI-UHFFFAOYSA-N
PBDE-52	C_{12}H_{6}Br_{4}O	2,2',5,5'-tetrabromodiphenyl ether	446254-24-6	CDTHXJORUCZHMD-UHFFFAOYSA-N
PBDE-53	C_{12}H_{6}Br_{4}O	2,2',5,6'-tetrabromodiphenyl ether	446254-25-7	SDVQGIMOFXMKHR-UHFFFAOYSA-N
PBDE-54	C_{12}H_{6}Br_{4}O	2,2',6,6'-tetrabromodiphenyl ether	446254-26-8	WCDCHQGVTZHVSO-UHFFFAOYSA-N
PBDE-55	C_{12}H_{6}Br_{4}O	2,3,3',4-tetrabromodiphenyl ether	446254-27-9	VIHUMJGEWQPWOT-UHFFFAOYSA-N
PBDE-56	C_{12}H_{6}Br_{4}O	2,3,3',4'-tetrabromodiphenyl ether	446254-28-0	NFOIVCGFYJIYIB-UHFFFAOYSA-N
PBDE-57	C_{12}H_{6}Br_{4}O	2,3,3',5-tetrabromodiphenyl ether	337513-82-3	CSIFWDKYUJLQEB-UHFFFAOYSA-N
PBDE-58	C_{12}H_{6}Br_{4}O	2,3,3',5'-tetrabromodiphenyl ether	446254-29-1	SWOYBZHGPZIRHS-UHFFFAOYSA-N
PBDE-59	C_{12}H_{6}Br_{4}O	2,3,3',6-tetrabromodiphenyl ether	446254-30-4	DMAMJZQQOWYEHT-UHFFFAOYSA-N
PBDE-60	C_{12}H_{6}Br_{4}O	2,3,4,4'-tetrabromodiphenyl ether	446254-31-5	ARERIMFZYPFJAV-UHFFFAOYSA-N
PBDE-61	C_{12}H_{6}Br_{4}O	2,3,4,5-tetrabromodiphenyl ether	446254-32-6	NDRSXNBQWAOQPP-UHFFFAOYSA-N
PBDE-62	C_{12}H_{6}Br_{4}O	2,3,4,6-tetrabromodiphenyl ether	446254-33-7	YIQYWYZZLOZVRM-UHFFFAOYSA-N
PBDE-63	C_{12}H_{6}Br_{4}O	2,3,4',5-tetrabromodiphenyl ether	446254-34-8	HNICYXFGCWPYGC-UHFFFAOYSA-N
PBDE-64	C_{12}H_{6}Br_{4}O	2,3,4',6-tetrabromodiphenyl ether	446254-35-9	LDCXVFJUWKKBNY-UHFFFAOYSA-N
PBDE-65	C_{12}H_{6}Br_{4}O	2,3,5,6-tetrabromodiphenyl ether	446254-36-0	HPEUYVBOPJQVPN-UHFFFAOYSA-N
PBDE-66	C_{12}H_{6}Br_{4}O	2,3',4,4'-tetrabromodiphenyl ether	189084-61-5	DHUMTYRHKMCVAG-UHFFFAOYSA-N
PBDE-67	C_{12}H_{6}Br_{4}O	2,3',4,5-tetrabromodiphenyl ether	446254-37-1	OARGWSONVLGXQA-UHFFFAOYSA-N
PBDE-68	C_{12}H_{6}Br_{4}O	2,3',4,5'-tetrabromodiphenyl ether	446254-38-2	UFWGRLCUOLLWAO-UHFFFAOYSA-N
PBDE-69	C_{12}H_{6}Br_{4}O	2,3',4,6-tetrabromodiphenyl ether	327185-09-1	NHZNRCYNZJADTG-UHFFFAOYSA-N
PBDE-70	C_{12}H_{6}Br_{4}O	2,3',4',5-tetrabromodiphenyl ether	446254-39-3	GHQMTYWQVJZWAR-UHFFFAOYSA-N
PBDE-71	C_{12}H_{6}Br_{4}O	2,3',4',6-tetrabromodiphenyl ether	189084-62-6	COPAGYRSCJVION-UHFFFAOYSA-N
PBDE-72	C_{12}H_{6}Br_{4}O	2,3',5,5'-tetrabromodiphenyl ether	446254-40-6	GBBNZKQTOOZGIS-UHFFFAOYSA-N
PBDE-73	C_{12}H_{6}Br_{4}O	2,3',5',6-tetrabromodiphenyl ether	446254-41-7	WQFLVWXBCRJAQN-UHFFFAOYSA-N
PBDE-74	C_{12}H_{6}Br_{4}O	2,4,4',5-tetrabromodiphenyl ether	446254-42-8	LXCFDVVDUVPAGR-UHFFFAOYSA-N
PBDE-75	C_{12}H_{6}Br_{4}O	2,4,4',6-tetrabromodiphenyl ether	189084-63-7	BWCNKMFFUGBFGB-UHFFFAOYSA-N
PBDE-76	C_{12}H_{6}Br_{4}O	2,3',4',5'-tetrabromodiphenyl ether	446254-43-9	NCSWBJSFVPJPPK-UHFFFAOYSA-N
PBDE-77	C_{12}H_{6}Br_{4}O	3,3',4,4'-tetrabromodiphenyl ether	93703-48-1	RYGLOWMCGZHYRQ-UHFFFAOYSA-N
PBDE-78	C_{12}H_{6}Br_{4}O	3,3',4,5-tetrabromodiphenyl ether	446254-45-1	HWOBLTZZSVXBOJ-UHFFFAOYSA-N
PBDE-79	C_{12}H_{6}Br_{4}O	3,3',4,5'-tetrabromodiphenyl ether	446254-48-4	LELQGHJEUVRPEV-UHFFFAOYSA-N
PBDE-80	C_{12}H_{6}Br_{4}O	3,3',5,5'-tetrabromodiphenyl ether	103173-66-6	HFIOZJQRZKNPKJ-UHFFFAOYSA-N
PBDE-81	C_{12}H_{6}Br_{4}O	3,4,4',5-tetrabromodiphenyl ether	446254-50-8	ULFOIXCXIWHJDS-UHFFFAOYSA-N
PBDE-82	C_{12}H_{5}Br_{5}O	2,2',3,3',4-pentabromodiphenyl ether	327185-11-5	RQMSPGJESCCPQX-UHFFFAOYSA-N
PBDE-83	C_{12}H_{5}Br_{5}O	2,2',3,3',5-pentabromodiphenyl ether	446254-51-9	XAHYSNUYJLNDBX-UHFFFAOYSA-N
PBDE-84	C_{12}H_{5}Br_{5}O	2,2',3,3',6-pentabromodiphenyl ether	446254-52-0	PPIZNRAVQHNLJM-UHFFFAOYSA-N
PBDE-85	C_{12}H_{5}Br_{5}O	2,2',3,4,4'-pentabromodiphenyl ether	182346-21-0	DMLQSUZPTTUUDP-UHFFFAOYSA-N
PBDE-86	C_{12}H_{5}Br_{5}O	2,2',3,4,5-pentabromodiphenyl ether	446254-53-1	YMVWYUWOUOQCQP-UHFFFAOYSA-N
PBDE-87	C_{12}H_{5}Br_{5}O	2,2',3,4,5'-pentabromodiphenyl ether	446254-54-2	WKYQUGCIKNOXFW-UHFFFAOYSA-N
PBDE-88	C_{12}H_{5}Br_{5}O	2,2',3,4,6-pentabromodiphenyl ether	446254-55-3	OPZUHBCVIZNZFB-UHFFFAOYSA-N
PBDE-89	C_{12}H_{5}Br_{5}O	2,2',3,4,6'-pentabromodiphenyl ether	446254-56-4	XGFLJLJXVIMCNR-UHFFFAOYSA-N
PBDE-90	C_{12}H_{5}Br_{5}O	2,2',3,4',5-pentabromodiphenyl ether	446254-57-5	BATFXMGTVIESIQ-UHFFFAOYSA-N
PBDE-91	C_{12}H_{5}Br_{5}O	2,2',3,4',6-pentabromodiphenyl ether	446254-58-6	HWNJTZKDPNZUSO-UHFFFAOYSA-N
PBDE-92	C_{12}H_{5}Br_{5}O	2,2',3,5,5'-pentabromodiphenyl ether	446254-59-7	QWSQOVAGRDRZLM-UHFFFAOYSA-N
PBDE-93	C_{12}H_{5}Br_{5}O	2,2',3,5,6-pentabromodiphenyl ether	446254-60-0	BRTPVPJQMWLDNO-UHFFFAOYSA-N
PBDE-94	C_{12}H_{5}Br_{5}O	2,2',3,5,6'-pentabromodiphenyl ether	446254-61-1	JOPASNJHCFYVHD-UHFFFAOYSA-N
PBDE-95	C_{12}H_{5}Br_{5}O	2,2',3,5',6-pentabromodiphenyl ether	446254-62-2	BZDYRALIEYVMEP-UHFFFAOYSA-N
PBDE-96	C_{12}H_{5}Br_{5}O	2,2',3,6,6'-pentabromodiphenyl ether	446254-63-3	ZFCJNRDWGBZUED-UHFFFAOYSA-N
PBDE-97	C_{12}H_{5}Br_{5}O	2,2',3,4',5'-pentabromodiphenyl ether	446254-64-4	MAGYDGJRSCULJL-UHFFFAOYSA-N
PBDE-98	C_{12}H_{5}Br_{5}O	2,2',3,4',6'-pentabromodiphenyl ether	38463-82-0	OCLWEJVGAUFXQU-UHFFFAOYSA-N
PBDE-99	C_{12}H_{5}Br_{5}O	2,2',4,4',5-pentabromodiphenyl ether	60348-60-9	WHPVYXDFIXRKLN-UHFFFAOYSA-N
PBDE-100	C_{12}H_{5}Br_{5}O	2,2',4,4',6-pentabromodiphenyl ether	189084-64-8	NSKIRYMHNFTRLR-UHFFFAOYSA-N
PBDE-101	C_{12}H_{5}Br_{5}O	2,2',4,5,5'-pentabromodiphenyl ether	446254-65-5	QUZWDWNIWWAQDI-UHFFFAOYSA-N
PBDE-102	C_{12}H_{5}Br_{5}O	2,2',4,5,6'-pentabromodiphenyl ether	446254-66-6	JHFMCUVMAIQWRI-UHFFFAOYSA-N
PBDE-103	C_{12}H_{5}Br_{5}O	2,2',4,5',6-pentabromodiphenyl ether	446254-67-7	RJEMKRNASVHYKR-UHFFFAOYSA-N
PBDE-104	C_{12}H_{5}Br_{5}O	2,2',4,6,6'-pentabromodiphenyl ether	446254-68-8	CRSCWEYUPUKHPI-UHFFFAOYSA-N
PBDE-105	C_{12}H_{5}Br_{5}O	2,3,3',4,4'-pentabromodiphenyl ether	373594-78-6	LBPWAGZGYNOKAM-UHFFFAOYSA-N
PBDE-106	C_{12}H_{5}Br_{5}O	2,3,3',4,5-pentabromodiphenyl ether	446254-69-9	KLQKWMYXEWUAFP-UHFFFAOYSA-N
PBDE-107	C_{12}H_{5}Br_{5}O	2,3,3',4',5-pentabromodiphenyl ether	446254-70-2	OMGVAMFMRSETEG-UHFFFAOYSA-N
PBDE-108	C_{12}H_{5}Br_{5}O	2,3,3',4,5'-pentabromodiphenyl ether	446254-71-3	VBKPKHVLHGOKOJ-UHFFFAOYSA-N
PBDE-109	C_{12}H_{5}Br_{5}O	2,3,3',4,6-pentabromodiphenyl ether	446254-72-4	FXXXWTMLIQLDRP-UHFFFAOYSA-N
PBDE-110	C_{12}H_{5}Br_{5}O	2,3,3',4',6-pentabromodiphenyl ether	446254-73-5	LESZGJVTZILBTK-UHFFFAOYSA-N
PBDE-111	C_{12}H_{5}Br_{5}O	2,3,3',5,5'-pentabromodiphenyl ether	446254-74-6	PCHDCOXHJBWEPW-UHFFFAOYSA-N
PBDE-112	C_{12}H_{5}Br_{5}O	2,3,3',5,6-pentabromodiphenyl ether	446254-75-7	MFBMNSFADPTAKZ-UHFFFAOYSA-N
PBDE-113	C_{12}H_{5}Br_{5}O	2,3,3',5',6-pentabromodiphenyl ether	446254-76-8	OGZHLJXRGZFVLI-UHFFFAOYSA-N
PBDE-114	C_{12}H_{5}Br_{5}O	2,3,4,4',5-pentabromodiphenyl ether	446254-77-9	SFNAUTSNWPPDSY-UHFFFAOYSA-N
PBDE-115	C_{12}H_{5}Br_{5}O	2,3,4,4',6-pentabromodiphenyl ether	446254-78-0	BKTLDVXDOVSTEV-UHFFFAOYSA-N
PBDE-116	C_{12}H_{5}Br_{5}O	2,3,4,5,6-pentabromodiphenyl ether	189084-65-9	ACRQLFSHISNWRY-UHFFFAOYSA-N
PBDE-117	C_{12}H_{5}Br_{5}O	2,3,4',5,6-pentabromodiphenyl ether	446254-79-1	SOJBOGWFDBDWEG-UHFFFAOYSA-N
PBDE-118	C_{12}H_{5}Br_{5}O	2,3',4,4',5-pentabromodiphenyl ether	446254-80-4	VTMFEPLDDHZBGI-UHFFFAOYSA-N
PBDE-119	C_{12}H_{5}Br_{5}O	2,3',4,4',6-pentabromodiphenyl ether	189084-66-0	KXEOYBYEJCRPGB-UHFFFAOYSA-N
PBDE-120	C_{12}H_{5}Br_{5}O	2,3',4,5,5'-pentabromodiphenyl ether	417727-71-0	AKSBEUHDCRZJAN-UHFFFAOYSA-N
PBDE-121	C_{12}H_{5}Br_{5}O	2,3',4,5',6-pentabromodiphenyl ether	446254-81-5	GVGNVZBJVFDAAO-UHFFFAOYSA-N
PBDE-122	C_{12}H_{5}Br_{5}O	2,3,3',4',5'-pentabromodiphenyl ether	446254-82-6	CDNHGSPFIUITTN-UHFFFAOYSA-N
PBDE-123	C_{12}H_{5}Br_{5}O	2,3',4,4',5'-pentabromodiphenyl ether	446254-83-7	SBKMUEQNZNDYFW-UHFFFAOYSA-N
PBDE-124	C_{12}H_{5}Br_{5}O	2,3',4',5,5'-pentabromodiphenyl ether	446254-84-8	FGHJTAAHIFEHLT-UHFFFAOYSA-N
PBDE-125	C_{12}H_{5}Br_{5}O	2,3',4',5',6-pentabromodiphenyl ether	446254-85-9	SESXKFPOVUVGLR-UHFFFAOYSA-N
PBDE-126	C_{12}H_{5}Br_{5}O	3,3',4,4',5-pentabromodiphenyl ether	366791-32-4	SJNIIWPIAVQNRK-UHFFFAOYSA-N
PBDE-127	C_{12}H_{5}Br_{5}O	3,3',4,5,5'-pentabromodiphenyl ether	446254-86-0	RATMRXKBPDCKCZ-UHFFFAOYSA-N
PBDE-128	C_{12}H_{4}Br_{6}O	2,2',3,3',4,4'-hexabromodiphenyl ether	182677-28-7	WFLVELCLEGVBIH-UHFFFAOYSA-N
PBDE-129	C_{12}H_{4}Br_{6}O	2,2',3,3',4,5-hexabromodiphenyl ether	446254-87-1	PRNCVYAUCSGSOE-UHFFFAOYSA-N
PBDE-130	C_{12}H_{4}Br_{6}O	2,2',3,3',4,5'-hexabromodiphenyl ether	446254-88-2	YURCHLXPAGSJHU-UHFFFAOYSA-N
PBDE-131	C_{12}H_{4}Br_{6}O	2,2',3,3',4,6-hexabromodiphenyl ether	446254-89-3	MGKVPJFIGGBCBA-UHFFFAOYSA-N
PBDE-132	C_{12}H_{4}Br_{6}O	2,2',3,3',4,6'-hexabromodiphenyl ether	446254-90-6	FFEKBOKDYRZGRV-UHFFFAOYSA-N
PBDE-133	C_{12}H_{4}Br_{6}O	2,2',3,3',5,5'-hexabromodiphenyl ether	446254-91-7	XTBFPFHQPGZZJX-UHFFFAOYSA-N
PBDE-134	C_{12}H_{4}Br_{6}O	2,2',3,3',5,6-hexabromodiphenyl ether	446254-92-8	MIBDGPWSGDWIQR-UHFFFAOYSA-N
PBDE-135	C_{12}H_{4}Br_{6}O	2,2',3,3',5,6'-hexabromodiphenyl ether	446254-93-9	AMGHASDTWACNCS-UHFFFAOYSA-N
PBDE-136	C_{12}H_{4}Br_{6}O	2,2',3,3',6,6'-hexabromodiphenyl ether	446254-94-0	NTWGDSLWLUPCDW-UHFFFAOYSA-N
PBDE-137	C_{12}H_{4}Br_{6}O	2,2',3,4,4',5-hexabromodiphenyl ether	446254-95-1	HSTYYNPYXZYIAG-UHFFFAOYSA-N
PBDE-138	C_{12}H_{4}Br_{6}O	2,2',3,4,4',5'-hexabromodiphenyl ether	182677-30-1	IZFQCEZFGCMHOM-UHFFFAOYSA-N
PBDE-139	C_{12}H_{4}Br_{6}O	2,2',3,4,4',6-hexabromodiphenyl ether	446254-96-2	YESDYWNWEVPOLZ-UHFFFAOYSA-N
PBDE-140	C_{12}H_{4}Br_{6}O	2,2',3,4,4',6'-hexabromodiphenyl ether	243982-83-4	FLRODCDHJZNIGA-UHFFFAOYSA-N
PBDE-141	C_{12}H_{4}Br_{6}O	2,2',3,4,5,5'-hexabromodiphenyl ether	446254-97-3	XTXIYMGRRUJOIT-UHFFFAOYSA-N
PBDE-142	C_{12}H_{4}Br_{6}O	2,2',3,4,5,6-hexabromodiphenyl ether	446254-98-4	LJDGJCNHVGGOFW-UHFFFAOYSA-N
PBDE-143	C_{12}H_{4}Br_{6}O	2,2',3,4,5,6'-hexabromodiphenyl ether	446254-99-5	RQLZDUSZXOOBTM-UHFFFAOYSA-N
PBDE-144	C_{12}H_{4}Br_{6}O	2,2',3,4,5',6-hexabromodiphenyl ether	446255-00-1	ZMSJCQOCTPYCQP-UHFFFAOYSA-N
PBDE-145	C_{12}H_{4}Br_{6}O	2,2',3,4,6,6'-hexabromodiphenyl ether	446255-01-2	BTKLHMBWCRVCLC-UHFFFAOYSA-N
PBDE-146	C_{12}H_{4}Br_{6}O	2,2',3,4',5,5'-hexabromodiphenyl ether	446255-02-3	HGXPYDNHBUCRTR-UHFFFAOYSA-N
PBDE-147	C_{12}H_{4}Br_{6}O	2,2',3,4',5,6-hexabromodiphenyl ether	116995-33-6	OWBKWMDBTWHGHS-UHFFFAOYSA-N
PBDE-148	C_{12}H_{4}Br_{6}O	2,2',3,4',5,6'-hexabromodiphenyl ether	446255-03-4	OJMHGSMSQZEBFH-UHFFFAOYSA-N
PBDE-149	C_{12}H_{4}Br_{6}O	2,2',3,4',5',6-hexabromodiphenyl ether	446255-04-5	UJOUSZKYGGTPFQ-UHFFFAOYSA-N
PBDE-150	C_{12}H_{4}Br_{6}O	2,2',3,4',6,6'-hexabromodiphenyl ether	446255-05-6	SQNOZOVDXXSLSG-UHFFFAOYSA-N
PBDE-151	C_{12}H_{4}Br_{6}O	2,2',3,5,5',6-hexabromodiphenyl ether	446255-06-7	NGOQQUYCSISZMY-UHFFFAOYSA-N
PBDE-152	C_{12}H_{4}Br_{6}O	2,2',3,5,6,6'-hexabromodiphenyl ether	446255-07-8	BYBJJARTBKUIJD-UHFFFAOYSA-N
PBDE-153	C_{12}H_{4}Br_{6}O	2,2',4,4',5,5'-hexabromodiphenyl ether	68631-49-2	RZXIRSKYBISPGF-UHFFFAOYSA-N
PBDE-154	C_{12}H_{4}Br_{6}O	2,2',4,4',5,6'-hexabromodiphenyl ether	207122-15-4	VHNPZYZQKWIWOD-UHFFFAOYSA-N
PBDE-155	C_{12}H_{4}Br_{6}O	2,2',4,4',6,6'-hexabromodiphenyl ether	35854-94-5	HRSCBOSGEKXXSI-UHFFFAOYSA-N
PBDE-156	C_{12}H_{4}Br_{6}O	2,3,3',4,4',5-hexabromodiphenyl ether	405237-85-6	JSDPCMJWYRDQEV-UHFFFAOYSA-N
PBDE-157	C_{12}H_{4}Br_{6}O	2,3,3',4,4',5'-hexabromodiphenyl ether	446255-08-9	JUOAMVUIJQJZSZ-UHFFFAOYSA-N
PBDE-158	C_{12}H_{4}Br_{6}O	2,3,3',4,4',6-hexabromodiphenyl ether	446255-09-0	KRYHHTVQOOJNHQ-UHFFFAOYSA-N
PBDE-159	C_{12}H_{4}Br_{6}O	2,3,3',4,5,5'-hexabromodiphenyl ether	446255-10-3	IDYFFNCFLRCOPZ-UHFFFAOYSA-N
PBDE-160	C_{12}H_{4}Br_{6}O	2,3,3',4,5,6-hexabromodiphenyl ether	446255-11-4	OCVOYHGOXIIONK-UHFFFAOYSA-N
PBDE-161	C_{12}H_{4}Br_{6}O	2,3,3',4,5',6-hexabromodiphenyl ether	446255-12-5	WEYWRBBPPKSRGU-UHFFFAOYSA-N
PBDE-162	C_{12}H_{4}Br_{6}O	2,3,3',4',5,5'-hexabromodiphenyl ether	446255-13-6	UKPNCLHMNJCGCJ-UHFFFAOYSA-N
PBDE-163	C_{12}H_{4}Br_{6}O	2,3,3',4',5,6-hexabromodiphenyl ether	446255-14-7	NUEAHMLXQFHEJN-UHFFFAOYSA-N
PBDE-164	C_{12}H_{4}Br_{6}O	2,3,3',4',5',6-hexabromodiphenyl ether	446255-15-8	UJVYVXIHTJOJBZ-UHFFFAOYSA-N
PBDE-165	C_{12}H_{4}Br_{6}O	2,3,3',5,5',6-hexabromodiphenyl ether	446255-16-9	KXERERDGMTWBGZ-UHFFFAOYSA-N
PBDE-166	C_{12}H_{4}Br_{6}O	2,3,4,4',5,6-hexabromodiphenyl ether	189084-58-0	KVYODBMKQYVNEK-UHFFFAOYSA-N
PBDE-167	C_{12}H_{4}Br_{6}O	2,3',4,4',5,5'-hexabromodiphenyl ether	446255-17-0	NMUPLZRHSXJCJQ-UHFFFAOYSA-N
PBDE-168	C_{12}H_{4}Br_{6}O	2,3',4,4',5',6-hexabromodiphenyl ether	53551-87-4	HWZAPXGFMVEGPW-UHFFFAOYSA-N
PBDE-169	C_{12}H_{4}Br_{6}O	3,3',4,4',5,5'-hexabromodiphenyl ether	446255-18-1	JKFBMDHBJYKFKL-UHFFFAOYSA-N
PBDE-170	C_{12}H_{3}Br_{7}O	2,2',3,3',4,4',5-heptabromodiphenyl ether	327185-13-7	DLPNCMQTNWLTHD-UHFFFAOYSA-N
PBDE-171	C_{12}H_{3}Br_{7}O	2,2',3,3',4,4',6-heptabromodiphenyl ether	446255-19-2	FRMMMROUUPQUMZ-UHFFFAOYSA-N
PBDE-172	C_{12}H_{3}Br_{7}O	2,2',3,3',4,5,5'-heptabromodiphenyl ether	407606-59-1	DSRRSKFMOJQETR-UHFFFAOYSA-N
PBDE-173	C_{12}H_{3}Br_{7}O	2,2',3,3',4,5,6-heptabromodiphenyl ether	446255-20-5	NLBLNZDNOSSGPW-UHFFFAOYSA-N
PBDE-174	C_{12}H_{3}Br_{7}O	2,2',3,3',4,5,6'-heptabromodiphenyl ether	446255-21-6	VUUWOHUOYUGBEO-UHFFFAOYSA-N
PBDE-175	C_{12}H_{3}Br_{7}O	2,2',3,3',4,5',6-heptabromodiphenyl ether	6255-22-7	YATZWTXATDYQCK-UHFFFAOYSA-N
PBDE-176	C_{12}H_{3}Br_{7}O	2,2',3,3',4,6,6'-heptabromodiphenyl ether	407606-61-5	SWUALKCOTZOSMY-UHFFFAOYSA-N
PBDE-177	C_{12}H_{3}Br_{7}O	2,2',3,3',4,5',6'-heptabromodiphenyl ether	446255-23-8	ZHUHLPXIJIBQBJ-UHFFFAOYSA-N
PBDE-178	C_{12}H_{3}Br_{7}O	2,2',3,3',5,5',6-heptabromodiphenyl ether	446255-24-9	UWUVZUPEEORCRG-UHFFFAOYSA-N
PBDE-179	C_{12}H_{3}Br_{7}O	2,2',3,3',5,6,6'-heptabromodiphenyl ether	446255-25-0	COVXWWKOLMNRQE-UHFFFAOYSA-N
PBDE-180	C_{12}H_{3}Br_{7}O	2,2',3,4,4',5,5'-heptabromodiphenyl ether	446255-26-1	STMBXVOJNOJRPZ-UHFFFAOYSA-N
PBDE-181	C_{12}H_{3}Br_{7}O	2,2',3,4,4',5,6-heptabromodiphenyl ether	189084-67-1	GVNRIAPLVGNZPL-UHFFFAOYSA-N
PBDE-182	C_{12}H_{3}Br_{7}O	2,2',3,4,4',5,6'-heptabromodiphenyl ether	442690-45-1	ZYHDTADADSNMLV-UHFFFAOYSA-N
PBDE-183	C_{12}H_{3}Br_{7}O	2,2',3,4,4',5',6-heptabromodiphenyl ether	207122-16-5	ILPSCQCLBHQUEM-UHFFFAOYSA-N
PBDE-184	C_{12}H_{3}Br_{7}O	2,2',3,4,4',6,6'-heptabromodiphenyl ether	117948-63-7	JHDCZVAQPRXHEL-UHFFFAOYSA-N
PBDE-185	C_{12}H_{3}Br_{7}O	2,2',3,4,5,5',6-heptabromodiphenyl ether	405237-86-7	YRNMIFAQDSUFTR-UHFFFAOYSA-N
PBDE-186	C_{12}H_{3}Br_{7}O	2,2',3,4,5,6,6'-heptabromodiphenyl ether	446255-27-2	WUFQDCMRKKDNSF-UHFFFAOYSA-N
PBDE-187	C_{12}H_{3}Br_{7}O	2,2',3,4',5,5',6-heptabromodiphenyl ether	446255-28-3	RFZPXOBFDARWHV-UHFFFAOYSA-N
PBDE-188	C_{12}H_{3}Br_{7}O	2,2',3,4',5,6,6'-heptabromodiphenyl ether	116995-32-5	YGYDHFDPVGAMTL-UHFFFAOYSA-N
PBDE-189	C_{12}H_{3}Br_{7}O	2,3,3',4,4',5,5'-heptabromodiphenyl ether	259087-35-9	CQVLRTUESBMMJW-UHFFFAOYSA-N
PBDE-190	C_{12}H_{3}Br_{7}O	2,3,3',4,4',5,6-heptabromodiphenyl ether	189084-68-2	OUEYHQIMJGHOQN-UHFFFAOYSA-N
PBDE-191	C_{12}H_{3}Br_{7}O	2,3,3',4,4',5',6-heptabromodiphenyl ether	446255-30-7	BNBFKFHSIPERIM-UHFFFAOYSA-N
PBDE-192	C_{12}H_{3}Br_{7}O	2,3,3',4,5,5',6-heptabromodiphenyl ether	407578-53-4	ABLZOLAUBUSUHT-UHFFFAOYSA-N
PBDE-193	C_{12}H_{3}Br_{7}O	2,3,3',4',5,5',6-heptabromodiphenyl ether	446255-34-1	AUFJSWANTKXCFZ-UHFFFAOYSA-N
PBDE-194	C_{12}H_{2}Br_{8}O	2,2',3,3',4,4',5,5'-octabromodiphenyl ether	32536-52-0	ORYGKUIDIMIRNN-UHFFFAOYSA-N
PBDE-195	C_{12}H_{2}Br_{8}O	2,2',3,3',4,4',5,6-octabromodiphenyl ether	446255-38-5	GPQLSLKPHQEEOP-UHFFFAOYSA-N
PBDE-196	C_{12}H_{2}Br_{8}O	2,2',3,3',4,4',5,6'-octabromodiphenyl ether	446255-39-6	IEWFKOVTVJNWFF-UHFFFAOYSA-N
PBDE-197	C_{12}H_{2}Br_{8}O	2,2',3,3',4,4',6,6'-octabromodiphenyl ether	117964-21-3	AAFUUKPTSPVXJH-UHFFFAOYSA-N
PBDE-198	C_{12}H_{2}Br_{8}O	2,2',3,3',4,5,5',6-octabromodiphenyl ether	446255-42-1	IBKRHVDFFHQOSC-UHFFFAOYSA-N
PBDE-199	C_{12}H_{2}Br_{8}O	2,2',3,3',4,5,5',6'-octabromodiphenyl ether	446255-43-2	JNSLJYRXDGBNBE-UHFFFAOYSA-N
PBDE-200	C_{12}H_{2}Br_{8}O	2,2',3,3',4,5,6,6'-octabromodiphenyl ether	446255-46-5	JWMXGEPFVCRXQR-UHFFFAOYSA-N
PBDE-201	C_{12}H_{2}Br_{8}O	2,2',3,3',4,5',6,6'-octabromodiphenyl ether	446255-50-1	HQWFMMKREWXIGN-UHFFFAOYSA-N
PBDE-202	C_{12}H_{2}Br_{8}O	2,2',3,3',5,5',6,6'-octabromodiphenyl ether	67797-09-5	AHNZLQAZTWRRDW-UHFFFAOYSA-N
PBDE-203	C_{12}H_{2}Br_{8}O	2,2',3,4,4',5,5',6-octabromodiphenyl ether	337513-72-1	RTUZOQFRIPIWPS-UHFFFAOYSA-N
PBDE-204	C_{12}H_{2}Br_{8}O	2,2',3,4,4',5,6,6'-octabromodiphenyl ether	446255-54-5	YZABCBOJTHQTSX-UHFFFAOYSA-N
PBDE-205	C_{12}H_{2}Br_{8}O	2,3,3',4,4',5,5',6-octabromodiphenyl ether	446255-56-7	CVMKCYDBEYHNBM-UHFFFAOYSA-N
PBDE-206	C_{12}HBr_{9}O	2,2',3,3',4,4',5,5',6-nonabromodiphenyl ether	63387-28-0	CYRHBNRLQMLULE-UHFFFAOYSA-N
PBDE-207	C_{12}HBr_{9}O	2,2',3,3',4,4',5,6,6'-nonabromodiphenyl ether	437701-79-6	IEEVDIAVLGLVOW-UHFFFAOYSA-N
PBDE-208	C_{12}HBr_{9}O	2,2',3,3',4,5,5',6,6'-nonabromodiphenyl ether	437701-78-5	ASGZXYIDLFWXID-UHFFFAOYSA-N
PBDE-209	C_{12}Br_{10}O	decabromodiphenyl ether	1163-19-5	WHHGLZMJPXIBIX-UHFFFAOYSA-N

== Production ==
PBDEs were produced commercially via the bromination of diphenyl ether, with three technical-grade mixtures being sold, varying by degree of bromination.

In the United States, PBDEs were marketed with the trade names DE-60F, DE-61, DE-62, and DE-71 applied to pentaBDE mixtures, DE-79 applied to octaBDE mixtures, and DE 83R and Saytex 102E applied to decaBDE mixtures. The available commercial PBDE products were not single compounds or even single congeners but rather mixtures of congeners.

Technical pentaBDE predominantly contained pentabromo derivatives (50–62%); however, the mixture also contained tetrabromides (24–38%) and hexabromides (4–8%), as well as traces of the tribromides (0–1%). Technical octaBDE was a mixture of homologs: hexa-, hepta-, octa-, nona-, and decabromides. Technical decaBDE was 97% decabromide, with small amounts of octa- and nonabromides.

Commercial production of PBDEs began in the 1970s, and continued until the early 2010s. Cumulative global production is estimated to have been 175 kt for pentaBDE, 130 kt for octaBDE, and 1600 kt for decaBDE.

== Health and environmental concerns ==
=== Exposure ===
Polybrominated diphenyl ethers (PBDEs) can be released into the environment where they are used or produced, possibly entering air, water, soil or the human digestive system when consumed, inhaled or via the skin. Despite the banning and phase out of several forms of PBDEs, many consumer products still contain them in the 21st century, and represent potential exposure sources, including furniture and other consumer products containing polyurethane foam, appliances, pipes, plastics, and old electronic equipment.

Generally, governments have determined that PBDEs are not harmful to human health in the exposure amounts assessed. Ingestion of house dust accounts for 80–90% of total PBDE exposure, while the remaining exposure occurs from food ingestion. PBDE-contaminated foods, particularly those high in fat content, such as fatty meats or fish, are possible sources of exposure. In breastfeeding infants, breast milk may be an exposure source because PBDEs can be present in the mother and her milk. Various other food items may contain PBDEs, including meat, meat products, dairy products, and seafood.

PBDEs have not been detected beyond trace levels in water. In the environment, soils and sediments are the major deposits for PBDEs. PBDEs can enter soil from discarded products, such as in landfills. As biosolids (sewage) may contain PBDEs, exposure from soils or farmlands that have been fertilized with biosolids may occur. Wildlife may have exposure by consuming foods containing PBDEs, whereas organisms that live in sediments may be contaminated by PBDEs.

=== Excretion ===
PBDEs and their metabolites are excreted mainly in the feces and some in the urine. Owing to their deposition in body fat stores, some PBDEs remain in the body for many years, and may enter the bodies of unborn babies via the placenta.

=== Research on health effects ===
Nothing certain has been established about the effects of PBDEs on human health. Most information regarding toxicity of PBDEs and their metabolites is from early-stage animal studies. Evidence for PBDE-mediated effects from human studies in systems other than the developing nervous system, such as in cancer development, is inconclusive or non-existent. Particularly for the potential effects of PBDEs on the developing fetus, research has focused on the health status of mothers and gestational age of the infant.

=== Sediment contamination ===
Increasing environmental concentrations and changing distributions of PBDEs in sediments of the Clyde River Estuary in Scotland, UK have been assessed. Analysis of six sediment cores each of 1 m depth from Glasgow city to Greenock revealed that total concentrations increased toward the river bed surface (0–10 cm). Amounts of PBDE ranged from 1 to 2,645 µg/kg (dry wt. sediment) with a mean of 287 µg/kg (dry wt. sediment). Down-core PBDE congener profiles showed that higher concentrations were due to elevated levels of BDE-209. The majority of the sediment records clearly showed a change from mainly lower molecular weight BDEs 47,99, 183, 153 at lower depths to BDE-209 near the surface, a change in congener and homologue group patterns that corresponds to the restrictions of penta- and octaBDE commercial mixtures under EU law in 2004–2006.

While biodegradation is not considered the main pathway for PBDEs, photolysis and pyrolysis can be of interest in studies of transformation of PBDEs.

== Regulations of PBDEs ==
=== United States ===
In August 2003, the State of California outlawed the sale of penta- and octaBDE and products containing them, effective 1 January 2008. PBDEs are ubiquitous in the environment, and, according to the EPA, exposure may pose health risks. According to U.S. EPA's Integrated Risk Information System, evidence indicates that PBDEs may possess liver toxicity, thyroid toxicity, and neurodevelopmental toxicity. In June 2008, the U.S. EPA set a safe daily exposure level ranging from 0.1 to 7 μg/kg body weight per day for the four most common PBDE congeners. In April 2007, the legislature of the state of Washington passed a bill banning the use of PBDEs. The State of Maine Department of Environmental Protection has restrictions on PBDEs, and in 2008, the legislature passed a bill phasing out the use of decaBDE.

The U.S. importers and manufacturers of PBDEs withdrew pentaBDE and octaBDE from sale in 2004, and decaBDE from sale by the end of 2013. In November 2024, the EPA added decaBDE to the Toxic Substances Control Act to prohibit release into water during manufacturing, processing or distribution in commerce of decaBDE and decaBDE-containing products, and a phase-out of processing and distribution of wire and cable insulation containing decaDBE for nuclear power facilities.

=== Canada ===
Since 2012, PBDEs are among chemicals prohibited from manufacture, use, sale, offer for sale or import, as regulated in the Prohibition of Certain Toxic Substances Regulations of the 1999 Canadian Environmental Protection Act. PBDEs are regarded in the regulation as "toxic to the environment and/or human health, are generally persistent, bioaccumulative, and/or inherently toxic."

=== European Union ===
The European Union decided to ban the use of two classes of flame retardants, in particular, PBDEs and polybrominated biphenyls (PBBs) in electric and electronic devices. This ban was formalised in the RoHS Directive, and an upper limit of 1 g/kg for the sum of PBBs and PBDEs was set. In February 2009, the Institute for Reference Materials and Measurements released two certified reference materials to help analytical laboratories better detect these two classes of flame retardants. The reference materials were custom-made to contain all relevant PBDEs and PBBs at levels close to the legal limit.

=== International ===
At an international level, in May 2009 the Parties of the Stockholm Convention on Persistent Organic Pollutants (POPs) decided to list commercial pentaBDE and commercial octaBDE as POP substances. This listing is due to the properties of hexaBDE and heptaBDE, which are components of commercial octaBDE, and to the properties of tetraBDE and pentaBDE, which are the main components of commercial pentaBDE. In 2017, it was decided to also list decaBDE.

== Alternatives ==
Major decaBDE producers have switched to manufacturing decabromodiphenyl ethane, a structurally related compound that has also come under suspicion as an environmental pollutant. Non-halogenated alternatives also exist.
