= Octabromodiphenyl ether =

- General chemical structure of octabromodiphenyl ethers, where m + n = 8

Names
- Other names Octabromobiphenyl ether; OctaBDE, Octa-BDE; Octabromodiphenyl oxide; OBDPO

Identifiers
CAS Number	32536-52-0
ChemSpider	None
ECHA InfoCard	100.046.428
EC Number	251-087-9
UNII	QFL9YO91JE
CompTox Dashboard (EPA)	DTXSID8024236

Properties
Chemical formula	C_{12}H_{2}Br_{8}O
Molar mass	801.379 g·mol^{−1}
Appearance	White solid
Density	2.9 g/cm^{3}
Melting point	Depends on product composition
Boiling point	Decomposes
Solubility in water	< 0.1 mg/L

Hazards
- GHS labelling
Pictograms	(GHS08: Health hazard)
Signal word	Danger
Hazard statements	H360Df

Related compounds
Related polybrominated diphenyl ethers	Decabromodiphenyl ether, Pentabromodiphenyl ether
Related compounds	diphenyl ether
- Except where otherwise noted, data are given for materials in their standard state (at 25 °C [77 °F], 100 kPa). verify (what is ?) Infobox references

Octabromodiphenyl ether (octaBDE, octa-BDE, OBDE, octa, octabromodiphenyl oxide, OBDPO) is a brominated flame retardant which belongs to the group of polybrominated diphenyl ethers (PBDEs).

== Composition, uses, and production ==
Commercial octaBDE (also known as "Octabrom") is a technical mixture of different PBDE congeners having an average of 7.2 to 7.7 bromine atoms per molecule of diphenyl ether. The predominant congeners in commercial octaBDE are those of heptabromodiphenyl ether and octaBDE. The term octaBDE alone refers to isomers of octabromodiphenyl ether (PBDE congener numbers 194–205).

Composition of commercial octaBDE
Structure	Congener	Name	Fraction
Structure of BDE-153	BDE-153	2,2′,4,4′,5,5′-hexa- bromodiphenyl ether	0.15–8.7%
Structure of BDE-154	BDE-154	2,2′,4,4′,5,6′-hexa- bromodiphenyl ether	0.04–1.1%
Structure of BDE-171	BDE-171	2,2′,3,3′,4,4′,6-hepta- bromodiphenyl ether	0.17–1.8%
Structure of BDE-180	BDE-180	2,2′,3,4,4′,5,5′-hepta- bromodiphenyl ether	n.d.–1.7%
Structure of BDE-183	BDE-183	2,2′,3,4,4′,5′,6-hepta- bromodiphenyl ether	13–42%
Structure of BDE-196	BDE-196	2,2′,3,3′,4,4′,5,6′-octa- bromodiphenyl ether	3.1–10.5%
Structure of BDE-197	BDE-197	2,2′,3,3′,4,4′,6,6′-octa- bromodiphenyl ether	11–22%
Structure of BDE-203	BDE-203	2,2′,3,4,4′,5,5′,6-octa- bromodiphenyl ether	4.4–8.1%
Structure of BDE-206	BDE-206	2,2′,3,3′,4,4′,5,5′,6-nona- bromodiphenyl ether	1.4–7.7%
Structure of BDE-207	BDE-207	2,2′,3,3′,4,4′,5,6,6′-nona- bromodiphenyl ether	11–12%
Structure of BDE-209	BDE-209	Deca- bromodiphenyl ether	1.3–50%

Only congeners with more than 1% listed.

OctaBDE is used in conjunction with antimony trioxide as a flame retardant in the housings of electrical and electronic equipment, mainly in the plastic acrylonitrile butadiene styrene, but also in high impact polystyrene, polybutylene terephthalate and polyamides. Typically 12–15% of the weight of the final product will consist of octaBDE.

The annual demand worldwide was estimated as 3,790 tonnes in 2001, of which Asia accounted for 1,500 tonnes, the Americas 1,500 tonnes, and Europe 610 tonnes. The United Nations Environment Programme reports "Since 2004, it [octaBDE] is no longer produced in the EU, USA and the Pacific Rim and there is no information that indicates it is being produced in developing countries."

== Environmental chemistry ==
OctaBDE is released by different processes into the environment, such as emissions from the manufacture of octaBDE-containing products and from the products themselves. Elevated concentrations can be found in air, water, soil, food, sediment, sludge, and dust.

In the environment, "photolysis, anaerobic degradation and metabolism in biota" can cause debromination of octaBDE, which produces PBDEs with fewer bromine atoms "which may have higher toxicity and bioaccumulation potential."

== Exposures and health effects ==
OctaBDE may enter the body by ingestion or inhalation. It is "stored mainly in body fat" and may stay in the body for years. In an investigation carried out by the WWF, "the brominated flame retardant chemical (PBDE 153), which is a component of the penta- and octa- brominated diphenyl ether flame retardant products" was found in all blood samples of 14 ministers of health and environment of 13 European Union countries.

The chemical has no proven health effects in humans; however, based on animal experiments, octaBDE may have effects on "the liver, thyroid, and neurobehavioral development."

== Governmental actions ==
The European Union has carried out a comprehensive risk assessment under the Existing Substances Regulation 793/93/EEC. As a consequence, the EU has banned the use of octaBDE since 2004.

In the United States, as of 2005, "no new manufacture or import of" pentaBDE and octaBDE "can occur... without first being subject to EPA [i.e., United States Environmental Protection Agency ] evaluation." As of mid-2007, a total of eleven states in the U.S. had banned octaBDE.

In May 2009, commercial octaBDE was added to the Stockholm Convention as it meets the criteria for the so-called persistent organic pollutants of persistence, bioaccumulation and toxicity.

== Alternatives ==
Alternatives to octaBDE include tetrabromobisphenol A, 1,2-bis (pentabromophenoxy) ethane, 1,2-bis(tribromophenoxy)ethane, triphenyl phosphate, resorcinol bis(diphenylphosphate), and brominated polystyrene; however, for each of these "the existing data on toxicological and ecotoxicological effects are fewer than for octabromodiphenyl ether."
