= Pentabromodiphenyl ether =

- General chemical structure of pentabromodiphenyl ethers, where n + m = 5

Names
- Other names PentaBDE; Penta-BDE; PeBDE; Penta; PBDPO; Pentabromobiphenyl ether

Identifiers
CAS Number	32534-81-9; 2,2',4,4',5: 60348-60-9; 2,2′,4,4′,6: 189084-64-8
3D model (JSmol)	2,2',4,4',5: Interactive image; 2,2′,4,4′,6: Interactive image
ChEBI	2,2',4,4',5: CHEBI:81582; 2,2′,4,4′,6: CHEBI:138065
ChEMBL	2,2',4,4',5: ChEMBL374400
ChemSpider	2,2',4,4',5: 33255
ECHA InfoCard	100.046.425
EC Number	251-084-2
KEGG	2,2',4,4',5: C18203
PubChem CID	2,2',4,4',5: 36159; 2,2′,4,4′,6: 154083
RTECS number	DD6625350
UNII	7REL09ZX35; 2,2',4,4',5: D3A2T91I1E; 2,2′,4,4′,6: YW2W2K0A6U
UN number	3152 3077
CompTox Dashboard (EPA)	DTXSID2024246
- InChI: 2,2',4,4',5: InChI=1S/C12H5Br5O/c13-6-1-2-11(9(16)3-6)18-12-5-8(15)7(14)4-10(12)17/h1-5H Key: WHPVYXDFIXRKLN-UHFFFAOYSA-N; 2,2′,4,4′,6: InChI=1S/C12H5Br5O/c13-6-1-2-11(8(15)3-6)18-12-9(16)4-7(14)5-10(12)17/h1-5H Key: NSKIRYMHNFTRLR-UHFFFAOYSA-N
- SMILES: 2,2',4,4',5: C1=CC(=C(C=C1Br)Br)OC2=CC(=C(C=C2Br)Br)Br; 2,2′,4,4′,6: C1=CC(=C(C=C1Br)Br)OC2=C(C=C(C=C2Br)Br)Br

Properties
Chemical formula	C_{12}H_{5}Br_{5}O
Molar mass	564.691 g·mol^{−1}
Appearance	Viscous white to amber-colored liquid
Density	2.25-2.28 g/cm^{3}
Melting point	−7 to 3 °C (19 to 37 °F; 266 to 276 K)
Boiling point	Decomposes
Solubility in water	not soluble

Hazards
- GHS labelling
Pictograms	(GHS08: Health hazard) (GHS09: Environmental hazard)
Signal word	Warning
Hazard statements	H362, H373, H410
- Lethal dose or concentration (LD, LC)
LD_{50} (median dose)	5000 mg/kg (oral, rat)

Related compounds
Related polybrominated diphenyl ethers	octabromodiphenyl ether, decabromodiphenyl ether
Related compounds	diphenylether
- Except where otherwise noted, data are given for materials in their standard state (at 25 °C [77 °F], 100 kPa). verify (what is ?) Infobox references

Pentabromodiphenyl ether (also known as pentabromodiphenyl oxide) is a brominated flame retardant which belongs to the group of polybrominated diphenyl ethers (PBDEs). Because of their toxicity and persistence, their industrial production is to be eliminated under the Stockholm Convention, a treaty to control and phase out major persistent organic pollutants (POP).

== Composition, uses, and production ==
Commercial pentaBDE is a technical mixture of different PBDE congeners, with BDE-47 (2,2',4,4'- tetrabromodiphenyl ether) and BDE-99 (2,2',4,4',5-pentabromodiphenyl ether) as the most abundant. The term pentaBDE alone refers to isomers of pentabromodiphenyl ether (PBDE congener numbers 82-127).

Composition of commercial pentaBDE
Structure	Congener	Name	Fraction
Structure of BDE-47	BDE-47	2,2′,4,4′-tetra- bromodiphenyl ether	38–42%
Structure of BDE-85	BDE-85	2,2′,3,4,4′-penta- bromodiphenyl ether	2.2–3.0 %
Structure of BDE-99	BDE-99	2,2′,4,4′,5-penta- bromodiphenyl ether	45–49%
Structure of BDE-100	BDE-100	2,2′,4,4′,6-penta- bromodiphenyl ether	7.8–13 %
Structure of BDE-153	BDE-153	2,2′,4,4′,5,5′-hexa- bromodiphenyl ether	5.3–5.4 %
Structure of BDE-154	BDE-154	2,2′,4,4′,5,6′-hexa- bromodiphenyl ether	2.7–4.5 %

Only congeners with more than 1% listed.

Commercial pentaBDE is most commonly used as a flame retardant in flexible polyurethane foam; it was also used in printed circuit boards in Asia, and in other applications. The annual demand worldwide was estimated as 7,500 tonnes in 2001, of which the Americas accounted for 7,100 tonnes, Europe 150 tonnes, and Asia 150 tonnes. The global industrial demand increased from 4,000 tonnes annually in 1991 to 8,500 tonnes annually in 1999. As of 2007, "there should be no current production of C-PentaBDE [commercial pentaBDE] in Europe, Japan, Canada, Australia and the US"; however, it is possible that production continues elsewhere in the world.

== Environmental chemistry ==
PentaBDE is released by different processes into the environment, such as emissions from manufacture of pentaBDE-containing products and from the products themselves. Elevated concentrations can be found in air, water, soil, food, sediment, sludge, and dust.

== Exposures and health effects ==
PentaBDE may enter the body by ingestion or inhalation. It is "stored mainly in body fat" and may stay in the body for years. A 2007 study found that PBDE 47 (a tetraBDE) and PBDE 99 (a pentaBDE) had biomagnification factors in terrestrial carnivores and humans of 98, higher than any other industrial chemicals studied. In an investigation carried out by the WWF, "the brominated flame retardant chemical (PBDE 153), which is a component of the penta- and octa- brominated diphenyl ether flame retardant products" was found in all blood samples of 14 ministers of health and environment of 13 European Union countries.

The chemical has no proven health effects in humans; however, based on animal experiments, pentaBDE may have effects on "the liver, thyroid, and neurobehavioral development."

== Voluntary and governmental actions ==
In Germany, industrial users of pentaBDE "agreed to a voluntary phaseout in 1986." In Sweden, the government "phase[d] out the production and use of the [pentaBDE] compounds by 1999 and a total ban on imports came into effect within just a few years." The European Union (EU) has carried out a comprehensive risk assessment under the Existing Substances Regulation 793/93/EEC; as a consequence, the EU has banned the use of pentaBDE since 2004.

In the United States, as of 2005, "no new manufacture or import of" pentaBDE and octaBDE "can occur... without first being subject to EPA [i.e., United States Environmental Protection Agency ] evaluation." As of mid-2007, a total of eleven states in the U.S. had banned pentaBDE.

In May 2009, pentaBDE was added to the Stockholm Convention as it meets the criteria for the so-called persistent organic pollutants of persistence, bioaccumulation and toxicity.

== Alternatives ==
The EPA organized a Furniture Flame Retardancy Partnership beginning in 2003 "to better understand fire safety options for the furniture industry" after pentaBDE "was voluntarily phased out of production by the sole U.S. manufacturer on December 31, 2004." In 2005 the Partnership published evaluations of alternatives to pentaBDE, including triphenyl phosphate, tribromoneopentyl alcohol, tris(1,3-dicholoro-2-propyl)phosphate, and 12 proprietary chemicals.
