= Flame retardant =

Substance applied to items to slow burning or delay ignition

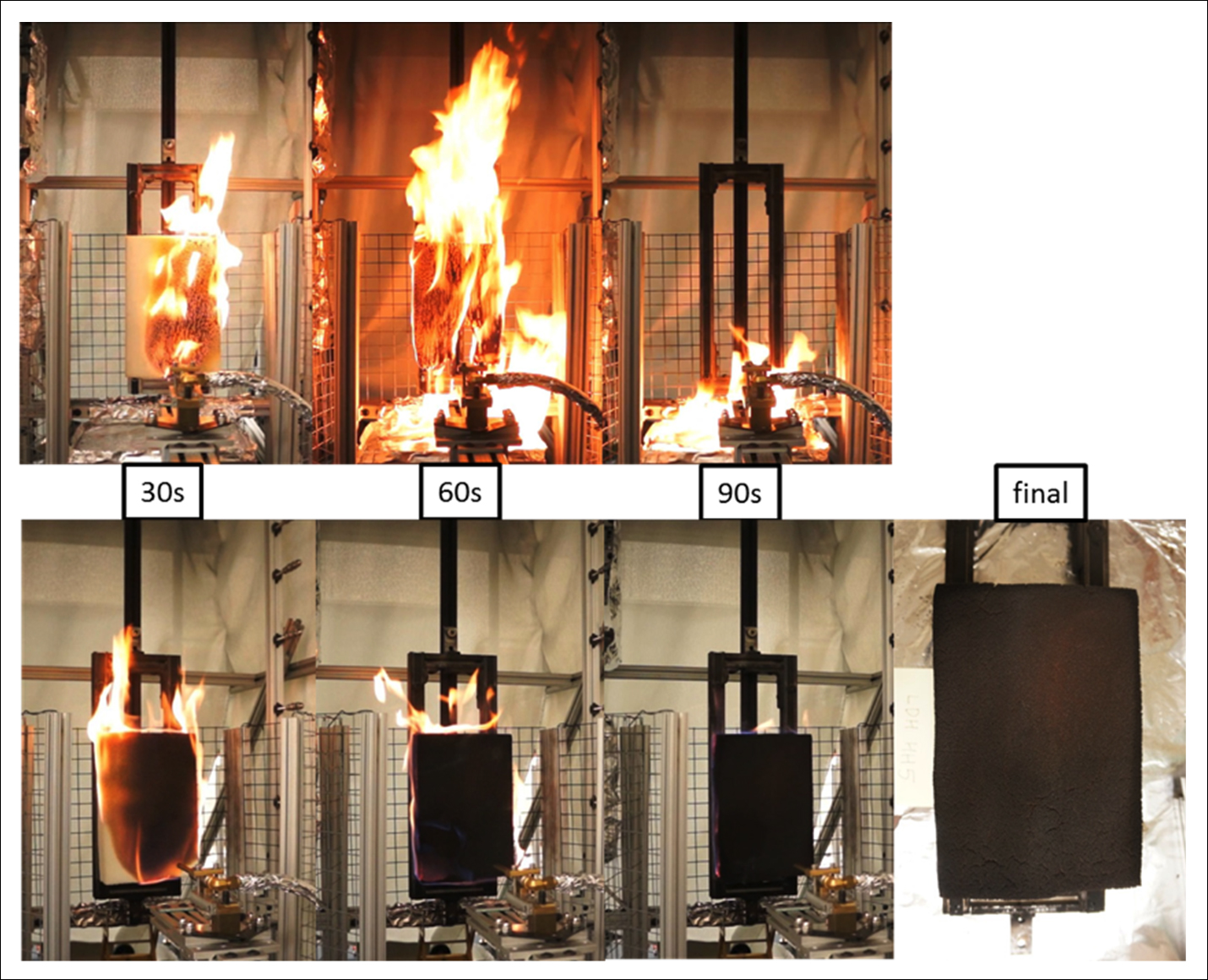
Open-flame tests compare the flammability of untreated polyurethane foam (top) and an identical foam sample surface treated with a sandwich-like coating incorporating layered double hydroxides. By 90 seconds after ignition the untreated foam is completely consumed.

Flame retardants are a diverse group of chemicals that are added to manufactured materials, such as plastics and textiles, and surface finishes and coatings. Flame retardants are activated by the presence of an ignition source and prevent or slow the further development of flames by a variety of different physical and chemical mechanisms. They may be added as a copolymer during the polymerisation process, or later added to the polymer at a moulding or extrusion process or (particularly for textiles) applied as a topical finish. Mineral flame retardants are typically additive, while organohalogen and organophosphorus compounds can be either reactive or additive.

== Classes ==
Both reactive and additive flame retardants types can be further separated into four distinct classes:

- Minerals such as aluminium hydroxide (ATH), magnesium hydroxide (MDH), huntite and hydromagnesite, various hydrates, red phosphorus, and boron compounds, mostly borates.
- Organohalogen compounds. This class includes organochlorines such as chlorendic acid derivatives and chlorinated paraffins; organobromines such as decabromodiphenyl ether (decaBDE), decabromodiphenyl ethane (a replacement for decaBDE), polymeric brominated compounds such as brominated polystyrenes, brominated carbonate oligomers (BCOs), brominated epoxy oligomers (BEOs), tetrabromophthalic anyhydride, tetrabromobisphenol A (TBBPA) and hexabromocyclododecane (HBCD). Most but not all halogenated flame retardants are used in conjunction with a synergist to enhance their efficiency. Antimony trioxide is widely used, but other forms of antimony such as the pentoxide and sodium antimonate are also used.
- Organophosphorus compounds. This class includes organophosphates such as triphenyl phosphate (TPP), resorcinol bis(diphenylphosphate) (RDP), bisphenol A diphenyl phosphate (BADP), and tricresyl phosphate (TCP); phosphonates such as dimethyl methylphosphonate (DMMP); and phosphinates such as aluminium diethyl phosphinate. In one important class of flame retardants, compounds contain both phosphorus and a halogen. Such compounds include tris(2,3-dibromopropyl) phosphate (brominated tris) and chlorinated organophosphates such as tris(1,3-dichloro-2-propyl)phosphate (chlorinated tris or TDCPP) and tetrakis(2-chlorethyl)dichloroisopentyldiphosphate (V6).
- Organic compounds such as carboxylic acid and dicarboxylic acid

== Retardation mechanisms ==
The basic mechanisms of flame retardants vary depending on the specific flame retardant and the substrate. Additive and reactive flame-retardant chemicals can both function in the vapor (gaseous) or condensed (solid) phase.

=== Endothermic degradation ===
Some compounds break down endothermically when subjected to high temperatures. Magnesium and aluminium hydroxides are an example, together with various carbonates and hydrates such as mixtures of huntite and hydromagnesite. The reaction removes heat from the substrate, thereby cooling the material. The use of hydroxides and hydrates is limited by their relatively low decomposition temperature, which limits the maximum processing temperature of the polymers (typically used in polyolefins for wire and cable applications).

=== Thermal shielding (solid phase) ===
A way to stop spreading of the flame over the material is to create a thermal insulation barrier between the burning and unburned parts. Intumescent additives are often employed; their role is to turn the polymer surface into a char, which separates the flame from the material and slows the heat transfer to the unburned fuel. Non-halogenated inorganic and organic phosphate flame retardants typically act through this mechanism by generating a polymeric layer of charred phosphoric acid.

=== Dilution of gas phase ===
Inert gases (most often carbon dioxide and water) produced by thermal degradation of some materials act as diluents of the combustible gases, lowering their partial pressures and the partial pressure of oxygen, and slowing the reaction rate.

=== Gas phase radical quenching ===
Chlorinated and brominated materials undergo thermal degradation and release hydrogen chloride and hydrogen bromide or, if used in the presence of a synergist like antimony trioxide, antimony halides. These react with the highly reactive H· and OH· radicals in the flame, resulting in an inactive molecule and a Cl· or Br· radical. The halogen radical is much less reactive compared to H· or OH·, and therefore has much lower potential to propagate the radical oxidation reactions of combustion.

== Materials ==
=== Flame retardant cotton ===
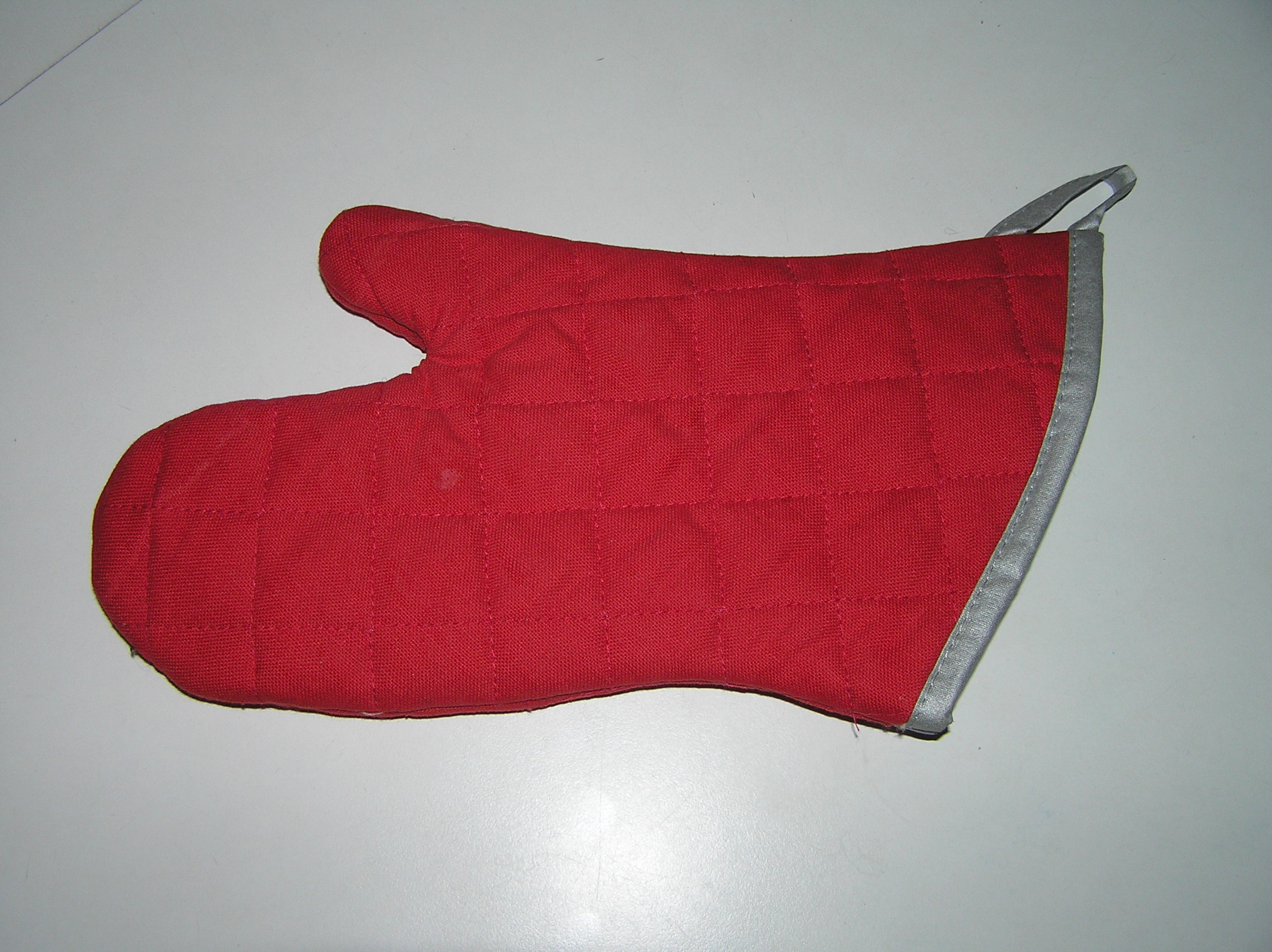
Flame retardant cotton is often used in oven mitts, pot holders, and other heat-adjacent accessories.

Flame retardant cotton is cotton that has been treated to prevent or slow ignition by different treatments applied during the manufacturing process. Cotton is typically made flame-resistant by chemical applications of polymeric, nonpolymeric, and polymeric/nonpolymeric hybrids that are composed of one or more of the elements such as nitrogen, sodium, phosphorus, silicon, boron, or chlorine.

=== Manufacturing ===
While non-organic fabrics are typically made flame-resistant by incorporating flame retardants into their matrices, surface modification is more convenient for organic fabrics like cotton.

=== Use ===
Cotton fabrics have been frequently used worldwide because of their advantageous properties with regard to thermal insulation, biocompatibility and moisture absorption and breathability performance. These advantages indicate potential applications of cotton fabrics in protective clothing and human health. However, natural cotton fabric is flammable and will rapidly burn. This drawback limits the use of cotton fabrics. Therefore, treating cotton fabrics to obtain a fire-resistant fabric is important.

Firefighters, or those exposed to flames on a regular basis, rely on flame-retardant cotton for both protection and comfort. Typically, their undergarments beneath the heavier fire-resistant gear are made of flame-retardant cotton or another breathable, organic fabric that has been treated to resist ignition.

Polymers containing nitrogen, sodium, and phosphorus atoms can work as materials for fire-resistant cellulosic textiles, such as cotton or rayon. Specifically, organic polymers can work as a flame retardant due to the presence of one or all three types of these elements. These atoms can be in the original polymers, or they can be incorporated by chemical modification. Flame retardant materials and coatings are being developed that are phosphorus and bio-based.

== Use and effectiveness ==
=== Fire safety standards ===
Flame retardants are typically added to industrial and consumer products to meet flammability standards for furniture, textiles, electronics, and building products like insulation.

==== U.S. state of California ====
In 1975, California began implementing Technical Bulletin 117 (TB 117), which requires that materials such as polyurethane foam used to fill furniture be able to withstand a small open flame, equivalent to a candle, for at least 12 seconds. In polyurethane foam, furniture manufacturers typically meet TB 117 with additive halogenated organic flame retardants. Although no other US states have a similar standard, because California has such a large market many manufacturers meet TB 117 in products that they distribute across the United States. The proliferation of flame retardants, and especially halogenated organic flame retardants, in furniture across the United States is strongly linked to TB 117.

In response to concerns about the health impacts of flame retardants in upholstered furniture, in February 2013 California proposed modifying TB 117 to require that fabric covering upholstered furniture meet a smolder test and to eliminate the foam flammability standards. Gov. Jerry Brown signed the modified TB117-2013 in November and it became effective in 2014. The modified regulation does not mandate a reduction in flame retardants.

==== EU ====
In Europe, flame retardant standards for furnishings vary, and are their most stringent in the UK and Ireland. Generally the ranking of the various common flame retardant tests worldwide for furniture and soft furnishings would indicate that the California test Cal TB117 - 2013 test is the most straightforward to pass, there is increasing difficulty in passing Cal TB117 -1975 followed by the British test BS 5852 and followed by Cal TB133. One of the most demanding flammability tests worldwide is probably the US Federal Aviation Authority test for aircraft seating which involves the use of a kerosene burner which blasts flame at the test piece. The 2009 Greenstreet Berman study, carried out by the UK government, showed that in the period between 2002 and 2007 the UK Furniture and Furnishings Fire Safety Regulations accounted for 54 fewer deaths per year, 780 fewer non-fatal casualties per year and 1065 fewer fires each year following the introduction of the UK furniture safety regulations in 1988.

=== Effectiveness ===
The effectiveness of flame retardant chemicals at reducing the flammability of consumer products in house fires is disputed. Advocates for the flame retardant industry, such as the American Chemistry Council's North American Flame Retardant Alliance, cite a study from the National Bureau of Standards indicating that a room filled with flame-retarded products (a polyurethane foam-padded chair and several other objects, including cabinetry and electronics) offered a 15-fold greater time window for occupants to escape the room than a similar room free of flame retardants. However, critics of this position, including the lead study author, argue that the levels of flame retardant used in the 1988 study, while found commercially, are much higher than the levels required by TB 117 and used broadly in the United States in upholstered furniture.

Another study concluded flame retardants are an effective tool to reduce fire risks without creating toxic emissions.

Several studies in the 1980s tested ignition in whole pieces of furniture with different upholstery and filling types, including different flame retardant formulations. In particular, they looked at maximum heat release and time to maximum heat release, two key indicators of fire danger. These studies found that the type of fabric covering had a large influence on ease of ignition, that cotton fillings were much less flammable than polyurethane foam fillings, and that an interliner material substantially reduced the ease of ignition. They also found that although some flame retardant formulations decreased the ease of ignition, the most basic formulation that met TB 117 had very little effect. In one of the studies, foam fillings that met TB 117 had equivalent ignition times as the same foam fillings without flame retardants. A report from the Proceedings of the Polyurethane Foam Association also showed no benefit in open-flame and cigarette tests with foam cushions treated with flame retardants to meet TB 117. However, other scientists support this open-flame test.

Compared with cotton, flame retardants increase fire toxicity. They have a large effect on bench-scale flammability tests, but a negligible effect on large scale fire tests. Furniture of naturally flame-retardant materials is much safer than foam with fire retardants.

== Environmental and health issues ==
The environmental behaviour of flame retardants has been studied since the 1990s. Mainly brominated flame retardants were found in many environmental compartments and organisms including humans, and some individual substances were found to have toxic properties. Therefore, alternatives have been demanded by authorities, NGOs and equipment manufacturers. The EU-funded collaborative research project ENFIRO (EU research project FP7: 226563, concluded in 2012) started out from the assumption that not enough environmental and health data were known of alternatives to the established brominated flame retardants. In order to make the evaluation fully comprehensive, it was decided to compare also material and fire performance as well as attempt a life-cycle assessment of a reference product containing halogen free versus brominated flame retardants. About a dozen halogen free flame retardants were studied representing a large variety of applications, from engineering plastics, printed circuit boards, encapsulants to textile and intumescent coatings.

A large group of the studied flame retardants were found to have a good environmental and health profile: ammonium polyphosphate (APP), aluminium diethyl phosphinate (Alpi), aluminium hydroxide (ATH), magnesium hydroxide (MDH), melamine polyphosphate (MPP), dihydrooxaphosphaphenanthrene (DOPO), zinc stannate (ZS) and zinc hydroxstannate (ZHS). Overall, they were found to have a much lower tendency to bioaccumulate in fatty tissue than the studied brominated flame retardants.

The tests on the fire behaviour of materials with different flame retardants revealed that halogen free flame retardants produce less smoke and toxic fire emissions, with the exception of the aryl phosphates RDP and BDP in styrenic polymers. The leaching experiments showed that the nature of the polymer is a dominating factor and that the leaching behaviour of halogen free and brominated flame retardants is comparable. The more porous or “hydrophilic” a polymers is the more flame retardants can be released. However, moulded plates which represent real world plastic products showed much lower leaching levels than extruded polymer granules. The impact assessment studies reconfirmed that the improper waste and recycling treatment of electronic products with brominated flame retardants can produce dioxins which is not the case with halogen free alternatives. Furthermore, the United States Environmental Protection Agency (US EPA) has been carrying out a series of projects related to the environmental assessment of alternative flame retardants, the “design for environment” projects on flame retardants for printed wiring boards and alternatives to decabromodiphenyl ether and hexabromocyclododecane (HBCD).

In 2009, the US National Oceanic and Atmospheric Administration (NOAA) released a report on polybrominated diphenyl ethers (PBDEs) and found that, in contrast to earlier reports, they were found throughout the US coastal zone. This nationwide survey found that New York's Hudson Raritan Estuary had the highest overall concentrations of PBDEs, both in sediments and shellfish. Individual sites with the highest PBDE measurements were found in shellfish taken from Anaheim Bay, California, and four sites in the Hudson Raritan Estuary. Watersheds that include the Southern California Bight, Puget Sound, the central and eastern Gulf of Mexico off the coast of Tampa and St. Petersburg, in Florida, and the waters of Lake Michigan near Chicago and Gary, Indiana, also were found to have high PBDE concentrations.

=== Health concerns ===
The earliest flame retardants, polychlorinated biphenyls (PCBs), were banned in the US in 1977 when it was discovered that they were toxic. Industries used brominated flame retardants instead, but these are now receiving closer scrutiny. In 2004 and 2008 the EU banned several types of polybrominated diphenyl ethers (PBDEs). Negotiations between the EPA and the two US producers of DecaBDE (a flame retardant that has been used in electronics, wire and cable insulation, textiles, automobiles and airplanes, and other applications), Albemarle Corporation and Chemtura Corporation, and the largest US importer, ICL Industrial Products, Inc., resulted in commitments by these companies to phase out decaBDE for most uses in the United States by December 31, 2012, and to end all uses by the end of 2013. The state of California has listed the flame retardant chemical chlorinated Tris (tris(1,3-dichloro-2-propyl) phosphate or TDCPP) as a chemical known to cause cancer. In December 2012, the California nonprofit Center for Environmental Health filed notices of intent to sue several leading retailers and producers of baby products for violating California law for failing to label products containing this cancer-causing flame retardant. While the demand for brominated and chlorinated flame retardants in North America and Western Europe is declining, it is rising in all other regions.

There is a potential association between the exposure to the Phosphorus Flame Retardants (PFR) in residential indoor dust and the development of allergies, asthma and dermatitis. A study was conducted in 2014 by Araki, A. et al. in Japan to assess this relationship. They found a significant association between the Tris (2-chloro-iso-propyl) phosphate (TCIPP) and atopic dermatitis with an odds ratio of 2.43. They also found that the Tributyl phosphate was associated with the development of allergic rhinitis and asthma with an odds ratio of 2.55 & 2.85 respectively.

Another study conducted by Chevrier et al. 2010 measured the concentration of 10 PBDE congeners, free thyroxine (T4), total T4, and thyroid-stimulating hormone (TSH) in 270 pregnant women around the 27th week of gestation. Associations between PBDEs and free and total T4 were found to be statistically insignificant. However, authors did find a significant association amongst exposure to PBDEs and lower TSH during pregnancy, which may have implications for maternal health and fetal development.

A prospective, longitudinal cohort study initiated after 11 September 2001, including 329 mothers who delivered in one of three hospitals in lower Manhattan, New York, was conducted by Herbstman et al. 2010. Authors of this study analyzed 210 cord blood specimens for selected PBDE congeners and assessed neurodevelopmental effects in the children at 12–48 and 72 months of age. Results showed that children who had higher cord blood concentrations of polybrominated diphenyl ethers (PBDEs) scored lower on tests of mental and motor development at 1–4 and 6 years of age. This was the first study to report any such associations in humans.

A similar study was conducted by Roze et al. 2009 in The Netherlands on 62 mothers and children to estimate associations between 12 Organohalogen compounds (OHCs), including polychlorinated biphenyls (PCBs) and brominated diphenyl ether (PBDE) flame retardants, measured in maternal serum during the 35th week of pregnancy and motor performance (coordination, fine motor skills), cognition (intelligence, visual perception, visuomotor integration, inhibitory control, verbal memory, and attention), and behavior scores at 5–6 years of age. Authors demonstrated for the first time that transplacental transfer of polybrominated flame retardants was associated with the development of children at school age.

Another study was conducted by Rose et al. in 2010 to measure circulating PBDE levels in 100 children between 2 and 5 years of age from California. The PBDE levels according to this study, in 2- to 5-year-old California children was 10 to 1,000 fold higher than European children, 5 times higher than other US children and 2 to 10 times higher than US adults. They also found that diet, indoor environment, and social factors influenced children's body burden levels. Eating poultry and pork contributed to elevated body burdens for nearly all types of flame retardants. Study also found that lower maternal education was independently and significantly associated with higher levels of most flame retardant congeners in the children.

San Antonio Statement on Brominated and Chlorinated Flame Retardants 2010: A group of 145 prominent scientists from 22 countries signed the first-ever consensus statement documenting health hazards from flame retardant chemicals found at high levels in home furniture, electronics, insulation, and other products. This statement documents that, with limited fire safety benefit, these flame retardants can cause serious health issues, and, as types of flame retardants are banned, the alternatives should be proven safe before being used. The group also wants to change widespread policies that require use of flame retardants.

=== Mechanisms of toxicity ===
==== Direct exposure ====
Many halogenated flame retardants with aromatic rings, including most brominated flame retardants, are likely thyroid hormone disruptors. The thyroid hormones triiodothyronine (T3) and thyroxine (T4) carry iodine atoms, another halogen, and are structurally similar to many aromatic halogenated flame retardants, including PCBs, TBBPA, and PBDEs. Such flame retardants therefore appear to compete for binding sites in the thyroid system, interfering with normal function of thyroid transport proteins (such as transthyretin) in vitro and thyroid hormone receptors. A 2009 in vivo animal study conducted by the US Environmental Protection Agency (EPA) demonstrated that deiodination, active transport, sulfation, and glucuronidation may be involved in disruption of thyroid homeostasis after perinatal exposure to PBDEs during critical developmental time points in utero and shortly after birth. Disruption of deiodinase as reported in the Szabo et al., 2009 in vivo study was supported in a follow-up in vitro study. The adverse effects on hepatic mechanism of thyroid hormone disruption during development have been shown to persist into adulthood. The EPA noted that PBDEs are particularly toxic to the developing brains of animals. Peer-reviewed studies have shown that even a single dose administered to mice during development of the brain can cause permanent changes in behavior, including hyperactivity.

Based on in vitro laboratory studies, several flame retardants, including PBDEs, TBBPA, and BADP, likely also mimic other hormones, including estrogens, progesterone, and androgens. Bisphenol A compounds with lower degrees of bromination seem to exhibit greater estrogenicity. Some halogenated flame retardants, including the less-brominated PBDEs, can be direct neurotoxicants in in vitro cell culture studies: By altering calcium homeostasis and signalling in neurons, as well as neurotransmitter release and uptake at synapses, they interfere with normal neurotransmission. Mitochondria may be particularly vulnerable to PBDE toxicity due to their influence on oxidative stress and calcium activity in mitochondria. Exposure to PBDEs can also alter neural cell differentiation and migration during development.

==== Degradation products ====
Many flame retardants degrade into compounds that are also toxic, and in some cases the degradation products may be the primary toxic agent:

- Halogenated compounds with aromatic rings can degrade into dioxins and dioxin-like compounds, particularly when heated, such as during production, a fire, recycling, or exposure to sun. Chlorinated dioxins are among the highly toxic compounds listed by the Stockholm Convention on Persistent Organic Pollutants.
- Polybrominated diphenyl ethers with higher numbers of bromine atoms, such as decaBDE, are less toxic than PBDEs with lower numbers of bromine atoms, such as pentaBDE. However, as the higher-order PBDEs degrade biotically or abiotically, bromine atoms are removed, resulting in more toxic PBDE congeners.
- When some halogenated flame retardants such as PBDEs are metabolized, they form hydroxylated metabolites that can be more toxic than the parent compound. These hydroxylated metabolites, for example, may compete more strongly to bind with transthyretin or other components of the thyroid system, can be more potent estrogen mimics than the parent compound, and can more strongly affect neurotransmitter receptor activity.
- Bisphenol-A diphenyl phosphate (BADP) and tetrabromobisphenol A (TBBPA) likely degrade to bisphenol A (BPA), an endocrine disruptor of concern.

=== Routes of exposure ===
People can be exposed to flame retardants through several routes, including diet; consumer products in the home, vehicle, or workplace; occupation; or environmental contamination near their home or workplace. Residents in North America tend to have substantially higher body levels of flame retardants than people who live in many other developed areas, and around the world human body levels of flame retardants have increased over the last 30 years.

Exposure to PBDEs has been studied the most widely. As PBDEs have been phased out of use due to health concerns, organophosphorus flame retardants, including halogenated organophosphate flame retardants, have frequently been used to replace them. In some studies, indoor air concentrations of phosphorus flame retardants has been found to be greater than indoor air concentrations of PBDEs. The European Food Safety Authority (EFSA) issued in 2011 scientific opinions on the exposure to HBCD and TBBPA and its derivates in food and concluded that current dietary exposure in the European Union does not raise a health concern.

==== Exposure in the general population ====
The body burden of PBDEs in Americans correlates well with the level of PBDEs measured in swabs of their hands, likely picked up from dust. Dust exposure may occur in the home, car, or workplace. Levels of PBDEs can be as much as 20 times higher in vehicle dust as in household dust, and heating of the vehicle interior on hot summer days can break down flame retardants into more toxic degradation products. However, blood serum levels of PBDEs appear to correlate most highly with levels found in dust in the home. 60-80% of exposures are due to dust inhalation or ingestion. In addition to this, 20% to 40% of US adult exposure to PBDEs is through food intake as PBDEs bioaccumulate in the food chain. High concentration can be found in meat, dairy and fish with the remaining exposure largely due to dust inhalation or ingestion. Individuals can also be exposed through electronic and electrical devices. Young children in the United States tend to carry higher levels of flame retardants per unit body weight than do adults. Infants and toddlers are particularly exposed to halogenated flame retardants found in breast milk and dust. Because many halogenated flame retardants are fat-soluble, they accumulate in fatty areas such as breast tissue and are mobilized into breast milk, delivering high levels of flame retardants to breast-feeding infants. PBDEs also cross the placenta, meaning infants are exposed in utero. Mothers thyroid hormone (T4) level can be disrupted and exposure in utero in rat studies has been demonstrated to alter motor control, delay sensory development and puberty.

Another reason for high levels of exposure in young children are due to aging consumer products age, small particles of material become dust particles in the air and land on surfaces around the home, including the floor. Young children crawling and playing on the floor frequently bring their hands to their mouths, ingesting about twice as much house dust as adults per day in the United States. Children also have a higher food intake per kilogram of bodyweight compared to adults. Young children are also exposed to flame retardants through their clothing, car seats and toys. The introduction of these chemicals came about after the tragic death of children wearing brushed rayon fabric that would ignite easily. The US enacted the Flammable Fabrics Act passed in 1953 after which, flame retardants were mandated to be added to many children's items, including pajamas. While flame retardants are shown to decrease the risk of burn injuries in children, the risks of thyroid disruption as well as physical and cognitive developmental delays, are not outweighed.

A study was conducted by Carignan in 2013, C. et al. found that gymnasts are exposed to some flame-retardant products such as PentaBDE and TBB more than the general population in the United States. After testing hand-wipe samples before and after the exercise, they found that the BDE-153 concentration was four to over six times greater among gymnasts than the United States population. Also, the PentaBDE concentration was higher up to three times after exercise compared to the level before; indicating a higher level of the flame-retardants on the training equipment. Moreover, they also found several flame-retardant products with different concentrations in the air and dust that were higher in the gym than residencies. However, the study was performed on a small sample size; and further studies are recommended to assess the association.

==== Occupational exposure ====
Some occupations expose workers to higher levels of halogenated flame retardants and their degradation products. A small study of US foam recyclers and carpet installers, who handle padding often made from recycled polyurethane foam, showed elevated levels of flame retardants in their tissues. Workers in electronics recycling plants around the world also have elevated body levels of flame retardants relative to the general population. Environmental controls can substantially reduce this exposure, whereas workers in areas with little oversight can take in very high levels of flame retardants. Electronics recyclers in Guiyu, China, have some of the highest human body levels of PBDEs in the world. A study conducted in Finland determined the occupational exposure of workers to brominated flame retardants and chlorinated flame retardants (TBBPA, PBDEs, DBDPE, HBCD, Hexabromobenzene and Dechlorane plus). In 4 recycling sites of waste electrical and electronic equipment (WEEE), the study concluded that control measures implemented on site significantly reduced the exposure. Workers making products that contain flame retardants (such as vehicles, electronics, and baby products) may be similarly exposed. US firefighters can have elevated levels of PBDEs and high levels of brominated furans, toxic degradation products of brominated flame retardants.

==== Environmental exposure ====
Flame retardants manufactured for use in consumer products have been released into environments around the world. The flame retardant industry has developed a voluntary initiative to reduce emissions to the environment (VECAP) by promoting best practices during the manufacturing process. Communities near electronics factories and disposal facilities, especially areas with little environmental oversight or control, develop high levels of flame retardants in air, soil, water, vegetation, and people.

Organophosphorus flame retardants have been detected in wastewater in Spain and Sweden, and some compounds do not appear to be removed thoroughly during water treatment. Organophosphorus flame-retardants were also found in tap and bottled drinking water in China. Likewise in the Elbe river in Germany.

=== Disposal ===
When products with flame retardants reach the end of their usable life, they are typically recycled, incinerated, or landfilled.

Recycling can contaminate workers and communities near recycling plants, as well as new materials, with halogenated flame retardants and their breakdown products. Electronic waste, vehicles, and other products are often melted to recycle their metal components, and such heating can generate toxic dioxins and furans. When wearing Personal Protection Equipment (PPE) and when a ventilation system is installed, exposure of workers to dust can be significantly reduced, as shown in the work conducted by the recycling plant Stena-Technoworld AB in Sweden. Brominated flame retardants may also change the physical properties of plastics, resulting in inferior performance in recycled products and in “downcycling” of the materials. It appears that plastics with brominated flame retardants are mingling with flame-retardant-free plastics in the recycling stream and such downcycling is taking place.

Poor-quality incineration similarly generates and releases high quantities of toxic degradation products. Controlled incineration of materials with halogenated flame retardants, while costly, substantially reduces release of toxic byproducts.

Many products containing halogenated flame retardants are sent to landfills. Additive, as opposed to reactive, flame retardants are not chemically bonded to the base material and leach out more easily. Brominated flame retardants, including PBDEs, have been observed leaching out of landfills in industrial countries, including Canada and South Africa. Some landfill designs allow for leachate capture, which would need to be treated. These designs also degrade with time.

=== Regulatory opposition ===
Shortly after California amended TB117 in 2013 to require only flame-resistant furniture coverings (without restriction on the interior components), furniture manufacturers across the US heard increased demands for flame-retardant-free furniture. Of note, smolder-resistant fabrics used in flame-resistant coverings do not contain PBDEs, organophosphates, or other chemicals historically associated with adverse effects on human health. A number of decision-makers in the health sector - which accounts for nearly 18% of the US GDP - are committed to purchasing such materials and furniture. Early adopters of this policy included Kaiser Permanente, Advocate Health Care, Hackensack University Hospital, and University Hospitals. All together, furniture purchasing power of these hospitals totalled $50 million. All of these hospitals and hospital systems ascribe to the Healthier Hospitals Initiative, which has over 1300 member hospitals, and promotes environmental sustainability and community health within the healthcare industry.

Further legislation in California has served to educate the public about flame retardants in their homes, in effect reducing consumer demand for products containing these chemicals. According to a law (Senate Bill, 1019) signed by Governor Jerry Brown in 2014, all furniture manufactured after January 1, 2015 must contain a consumer warning label stating whether it does or does not contain flame retardant chemicals

As of September 2017, the topic reached federal regulatory attention in the Consumer Product Safety Commission, which voted to put together a Chronic Hazard Advisory Panel focused on describing certain risks of various consumer products, specifically baby and childcare products (including bedding and toys), upholstered home furniture, mattresses and mattresses and mattress pads, and plastic casings surrounding electronics. This advisory panel is charged specifically to address the risks of additive, non-polymeric organohalogen flame retardants (OFRs). Although these chemicals have not been banned, this ruling sets in motion an in-depth consumer safety investigation which could eventually lead to complete removal of these substances from consumer manufacturing.

Pursuant with the Toxic Substances Control Act of 1976, the Environmental Protection Agency is also actively evaluating the safety of various flame retardants, including chlorinated phosphate esters, tetrabromobisphenol A, cyclic aliphatic bromides, and brominated phthalates. Further regulations depend on EPA findings from this analysis, though any regulatory processes could take several years.

=== National Bureau of Standards testing ===
In a 1988 test program, conducted by the former National Bureau of Standards (NBS), now the National Institute of Standards and Technology (NIST), to quantify the effects of fire retardant chemicals on total fire hazard. Five different types of products, each made from a different type of plastic were used. The products were made up in analogous fire-retardant (FR) and non-retarded variants (NFR).

The impact of FR (flame retardant) materials on the survivability of the building occupants was assessed in two ways:

First, comparing the time until a domestic space is not fit for occupation in the burning room, known as "untenability"; this is applicable to the occupants of the burning room. Second, comparing the total production of heat, toxic gases, and smoke from the fire; this is applicable to occupants of the building remote from the room of fire origin.

The time to untenability is judged by the time that is available to the occupants before either (a) room flashover occurs, or (b) untenability due to toxic gas production occurs. For the FR tests, the average available escape time was more than 15-fold greater than for the occupants of the room without fire retardants.

Hence, with regard to the production of combustion products,

- The amount of material consumed in the fire for the fire retardant (FR) tests was less than half the amount lost in the non-fire retardant (NFR) tests.
- The FR tests indicated an amount of heat released from the fire which was 1/4 that released by the NFR tests.
- The total quantities of toxic gases produced in the room fire tests, expressed in "CO equivalents," were 1/3 for the FR products, compared to the NFR ones.
- The production of smoke was not significantly different between the room fire tests using NFR products and those with FR products.

Thus, in these tests, the fire retardant additives decreased the overall fire hazard.

== Global demand ==
In 2013, the world consumption of flame retardants was more than 2 million tonnes. The commercially most import application area is the construction sector. It needs flame retardants for instance for pipes and cables made of plastics. In 2008 the United States, Europe and Asia consumed 1.8 million tonnes, worth US$4.20-4.25 billion. According to Ceresana, the market for flame retardants is increasing due to rising safety standards worldwide and the increased use of flame retardants. It is expected that the global flame retardant market will generate US$5.8 billion. In 2010, Asia-Pacific was the largest market for flame retardants, accounting for approximately 41% of global demand, followed by North America, and Western Europe.

== See also ==
- Brominated flame retardant
- Cotton
- Fire glass
- Fire retardant
- Flammability
- NEMA FR-2
- NEMA FR-4
- Polymer
