= Decabromodiphenyl ether =

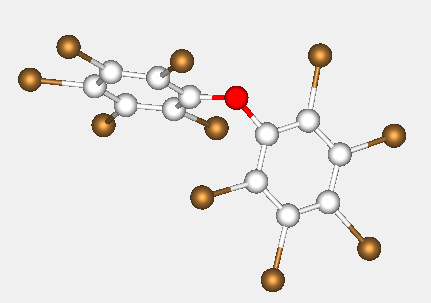

Names
- Preferred IUPAC name 1,1′-Oxybis(2,3,4,5,6-pentabromobenzene)
- Other names: 2,3,4,5,6-Pentabromo-1-(2,3,4,5,6-pentabromophenoxy)benzene; 6,6′-Oxybis(1,2,3,4,5-pentabromobenzene); decabromodiphenyl oxide (DBDPO); bis(pentabromophenyl) ether

Identifiers
CAS Number	1163-19-5
3D model (JSmol)	Interactive image
ChEBI	CHEBI:82436
ChEMBL	ChEMBL229975
ChemSpider	13764
ECHA InfoCard	100.013.277
EC Number	214-604-9
KEGG	C19383
PubChem CID	14410
RTECS number	KN3525000
UNII	N80BQ29A0H
CompTox Dashboard (EPA)	DTXSID9020376
- InChI: InChI=1S/C12Br10O/c13-1-3(15)7(19)11(8(20)4(1)16)23-12-9(21)5(17)2(14)6(18)10(12)22 Key: WHHGLZMJPXIBIX-UHFFFAOYSA-N; InChI=1/C12Br10O/c13-1-3(15)7(19)11(8(20)4(1)16)23-12-9(21)5(17)2(14)6(18)10(12)22 Key: WHHGLZMJPXIBIX-UHFFFAOYAY
- SMILES: Brc2c(Oc1c(Br)c(Br)c(Br)c(Br)c1Br)c(Br)c(Br)c(Br)c2Br

Properties
Chemical formula	C_{12}Br_{10}O
Molar mass	959.17 g/mol
Appearance	White or pale yellow solid
Density	3.364 g/cm^{3} solid
Melting point	294 to 296 °C (561 to 565 °F; 567 to 569 K)
Boiling point	425 °C (797 °F; 698 K) (decomposition)
Solubility in water	20-30 μg/litre

Hazards
- GHS labelling
Pictograms	(GHS07: Exclamation mark) (GHS09: Environmental hazard)
Signal word	Warning
Hazard statements	H302, H312, H319, H332, H341, H373, H413
Precautionary statements	P201, P202, P260, P264, P270, P271, P273, P280, P281, P301+P312, P302+P352, P304+P312, P304+P340, P305+P351+P338, P308+P313, P312, P314, P322, P330, P337+P313, P363, P405, P501
NFPA 704 (fire diamond)	2 0 0
Flash point	241 °C (466 °F; 514 K)
- Safety data sheet (SDS)

Related compounds
Related polybrominated diphenyl ethers	pentabromodiphenyl ether, octabromodiphenyl ether
Related compounds	Diphenyl ether
- Except where otherwise noted, data are given for materials in their standard state (at 25 °C [77 °F], 100 kPa). verify (what is ?) Infobox references

Decabromodiphenyl ether (also referred to as decaBDE, DBDE, BDE-209) is a brominated flame retardant which belongs to the group of polybrominated diphenyl ethers (PBDEs). It was commercialised in the 1970s and was initially thought to be safe, but is now recognised as a hazardous and persistent pollutant. It was added to Annex A of the Stockholm Convention on Persistent Organic Pollutants in 2017, which means that treaty members must take measures to eliminate its production and use. The plastics industry started switching to decabromodiphenyl ethane as an alternative in the 1990s, but this is now also coming under regulatory pressure due to concerns over human health.

== Composition, uses, and production ==
Commercial decaBDE is a technical mixture of various PBDE congeners (related compounds). Congener number 209 (decabromodiphenyl ether) and nonabromodiphenyl ether are the main components. The term decaBDE alone refers to only decabromodiphenyl ether, the single "fully brominated" PBDE.

DecaBDE is a flame retardant. The chemical "is always used in conjunction with antimony trioxide" in polymers, mainly in "high impact polystyrene (HIPS) which is used in the television industry for cabinet backs." DecaBDE is also used for "polypropylene drapery and upholstery fabric" by means of backcoating and "may also be used in some synthetic carpets."

The annual demand worldwide was estimated as 56,100 tonnes in 2001, of which the Americas accounted for 24,500 tonnes, Asia 23,000 tonnes, and Europe 7,600 tonnes. In 2012 between 2500 and 5000 metric tonnes of Deca-BDE was sold in Europe. As of 2007, Albemarle in the U.S., Chemtura in the U.S., ICL-IP in Israel, and Tosoh Corporation in Japan are the main manufacturers of DecaBDE.

Despite its listing in Annex A to the Stockholm Convention, decaBDE is still produced in China, namely in the provinces Shandong and Jiangsu.

== Environmental chemistry ==
As stated in a 2006 review, "Deca-BDE has long been characterized as an environmentally stable and inert product that was not capable of degradation in the environment, not toxic, and therefore of no concern." However, "some scientists had not particularly believed that Deca-BDE was so benign, particularly as evidence to this effect came largely from the industry itself." One problem in studying the chemical was that "the detection of Deca-BDE in environmental samples is difficult and problematic"; only in the late 1990s did "analytical advances... allow detection at much lower concentrations."

DecaBDE is released by diverse processes into the environment, such as emissions from manufacture of decaBDE-containing products and from the products themselves. Elevated concentrations can be found in air, water, soil, food, sediment, sludge, and dust. A 2006 study concluded "in general, environmental concentrations of BDE-209 [i.e., decaBDE] appear to be increasing."

=== The question of debromination ===
An important scientific issue is whether decaBDE debrominates in the environment to PBDE congeners with fewer bromine atoms, since such PBDE congeners may be more toxic than decaBDE itself. Debromination may be "biotic" (caused by biological means) or "abiotic" (caused by nonbiological means). The European Union (EU) in May 2004 stated "the formation of PBT/vPvB (Persistent, Bioaccumulative, and Toxic / very Persistent, very Bioaccumulative) substances in the environment as a result of degradation [of decaBDE] is a possibility that cannot be quantified based on current knowledge." In September 2004 an Agency for Toxic Substances and Disease Registry (ATSDR) report asserted that "DecaBDE seems to be largely resistant to environmental degradation."

In May 2006, the EPHA Environment Network (now The Health and Environment Alliance) released a report reviewing the available scientific literature and concluding the following:

- "It is difficult to assess the degree of BDE 209 photolytic debromination in house dust, soils and sediments when exposed to light. However, in cars debromination can be expected to occur more significantly."
- "In sewage anaerobic bacteria can initiate debromination of BDE 209, albeit at a slower rate than photolytic debromination, but due to the large volumes of DecaBDE in sewage sludge this may be significant."
- "Some fish appear capable of debrominating BDE 209 through metabolism. The extent of the metabolism varies among fish and it is difficult to determine the extent of debromination that would occur in the wild."

Subsequently, many studies have been published concerning decaBDE debromination. Common anaerobic soil bacteria debrominated decaBDE and octaBDE in a 2006 study. In 2006-2007 studies, metabolic debromination of decaBDE was demonstrated in fish, birds, cows, and rats. A 2007 study by La Guardia and colleagues measured PBDE congeners "from a wastewater treatment plant (sludge) to receiving stream sediments and associated aquatic biota"; it "support[ed] the hypothesis that metabolic debromination of -209 [i.e., decaBDE] does occur in the aquatic environment under realistic conditions." In another 2007 study, Stapleton and Dodder exposed "both a natural and a BDE 209 spiked [house] dust material" to sunlight, and found "nonabrominated congeners" and "octabrominated congeners" consistent with debromination of decaBDE in the environment.

In March 2007 the Illinois Environmental Protection Agency concluded "it can be questioned how much abiotic and microbial degradation [of decaBDE] occurs under normal environmental conditions, and it is not clear whether the more toxic lower-brominated PBDEs are produced in significant quantities by any of these pathways." In September 2010, the UK Advisory Committee on Hazardous Substances issued an opinion that ‘there is strong but incomplete, scientific evidence indicating that Deca-BDE has the potential to undergo transformation to lower brominated congeners in the environment'.

== Pharmacokinetics ==
Exposure to decaBDE is thought to occur by means of ingestion. Humans and animals do not absorb decaBDE well; at most, perhaps 2% of an oral dose is absorbed. It is believed that "the small amount of decaBDE that is absorbed can be metabolized".

Once in the body, decaBDE "might leave unchanged or as metabolites, mainly in the feces and in very small amounts in the urine, within a few days," in contrast with "lower brominated PBDEs... [which] might stay in your body for many years, stored mainly in body fat." In workers with occupational exposure to PBDEs, the calculated apparent half-life for decaBDE was 15 days, as opposed to (for example) an octaBDE congener with a half-life of 91 days.

=== Detection in humans ===
In the general population, decaBDE has been found in blood and breast milk, but at lower levels than other PBDE congeners such as 47, 99, and 153. A 2004 investigation carried out by the WWF detected decaBDE in blood samples from 3 of 14 ministers of health and environment of European Union countries, while (for example) PBDE-153 was found in all 14.

== Possible health effects in humans ==
In 2004, ATSDR wrote "Nothing definite is known about the health effects of PBDEs in people. Practically all of the available information is from studies of laboratory animals. Animal studies indicate that commercial decaBDE mixtures are generally much less toxic than the products containing lower brominated PBDEs. DecaBDE is expected to have relatively little effect on the health of humans." Based on animal studies, the possible health effects of decaBDE in humans involve the liver, thyroid, reproductive/developmental effects, and neurological effects.

=== Liver ===
ATSDR stated in 2004 "We don’t know if PBDEs can cause cancer in people, although liver tumors developed in rats and mice that ate extremely large amounts of decaBDE throughout their lifetime. On the basis of evidence for cancer in animals, decaBDE is classified as a possible human carcinogen by EPA [i.e., the United States Environmental Protection Agency ]."

=== Thyroid ===
One 2006 review concluded "Decreases in thyroid hormone levels have been reported in several studies, and thyroid gland enlargement (an early sign of hypothyroidism) has been shown in studies of longer duration exposure." A 2007 experiment giving decaBDE to pregnant mice found that decaBDE "is likely an endocrine disrupter in male mice following exposure during development" based on results such as decreased serum triiodothyronine.

=== Reproductive/developmental effects ===
"Significant data gaps" exist in the scientific literature on a possible relationship between decaBDE and reproductive/developmental effects. A 2006 study of mice found that decaBDE decreased some "sperm functions."

=== Neurological effects ===
EPA has determined that daily Deca exposures should be less than 7 μg/kg-d (micrograms per kilogram bodyweight per day) to minimize the chance of brain and nervous system toxicity. EPA based its assessment on a study in 2003 on neurotoxicity in mice, which some have "criticized for certain procedural and statistical problems." A 2007 study in mice "suggest[ed] that decaBDE is a developmental neurotoxicant that can produce long-term behavioral changes following a discrete period of neonatal exposure." Administration of decaBDE to male rats at 3 days of age in another 2007 study "was shown to disrupt normal spontaneous behaviour at 2 months of age."

== Overall risks and benefits ==
In 2002–2003 the American Chemistry Council's Brominated Flame Retardant Industry Panel, citing an unpublished 1997 study, estimated that 280 deaths due to fires are prevented each year in the U.S. because of the use of decaBDE. The industry advocacy group American Council on Science and Health, in a 2006 report largely concerning decaBDE, said that "the benefits of PBDE flame retardants, in terms of lives saved and injuries prevented, far outweigh any demonstrated or likely negative health effects from their use." A 2006 study concluded "current levels of Deca in the United States are unlikely to represent an adverse health risk for children." A report from the Swedish National Testing and Research Institute concerning the costs and benefits of decaBDE in television sets that was funded by BSEF assumed "no cost for injuries (either to humans or the environment) due to exposure to flame retardants... as there was no indication that such costs exist for DecaBDE"; it found that decaBDE's benefits exceeded its costs.

== Voluntary and governmental actions ==
=== Europe ===
In Germany, plastics manufacturers and the textile additives industry "declared in 1986 a voluntary phase-out of the use of PBDEs, including Deca-BDE." Although decaBDE was to be phased out of electrical and electronic equipment in the EU by 2006 under the EU's Restriction of Hazardous Substances Directive (RoHS), decaBDE use has been exempted from RoHS during 2005–2010. A case in the European Court of Justice against the RoHS exemption was decided against Deca-BDE and its use must be phased out by July 1, 2008. Sweden, an EU member, banned decaBDE as of 2007. The former European Brominated Flame Retardant Industry Panel (EBFRIP), now merged with EFRA, the European Flame Retardant Association, stated that Sweden's ban on DecaBDE "was a serious breach of EU law. The European Commission then started an infringement procedure against Sweden which lead to the Swedish Government repealing this restriction on 1 July 2008. The Pollution Control Authority of Norway, which is a member of the European Free Trade Association but is not a member of the EU, introduced a ban on deca-BDE in 2008.

DecaBDE has been the subject of a ten-year evaluation under the EU Risk Assessment procedure which has reviewed over 1100 studies. The Risk Assessment was published on the EU Official Journal in May 2008. Deca was registered under the EU's REACH Regulation at the end of August 2010.

The UK's Advisory Committee on Hazardous Substances (ACHS) presented their conclusions following a review of the emerging studies on Deca-BDE on 14 September 2010.

On 5 July ECHA withdrew Deca-BDE from its list of priority substances for Authorisation under REACH, therefore closing the public consultation. On 1 August 2014, ECHA submitted a restriction proposal for Deca-BDE. The agency is proposing a restriction on the manufacture, use and placing on the market of the substance and of mixtures and articles containing it. On 17 September 2014, ECHA submitted the restriction report which initiates a six months public consultation. On 9 February 2017, the European Commission adopted Regulation EU 2017/227. Article 1 of this regulation states that Regulation (EC) No 1907/2006 is amended to include a ban on the use of decaBDE in quantities greater than 0.1% by weight, effective from 2 March 2019. Products placed on the market prior to 2 March 2019 are exempt. Furthermore, the use decaBDE in aircraft is permissible until 2 March 2027. This EU process is running in parallel with a UNEP review to determine whether Deca-BDE should be listed as a Persistent Organic Pollutant (POP) under the Stockholm Convention.

=== United States ===
As of mid-2007 two states had instituted measures to phase out decaBDE. In April 2007, the state of Washington passed a law banning the manufacture, sale, and use of decaBDE in mattresses as of 2008; the ban "could be extended to TVs, computers, and upholstered residential furniture in 2011 provided an alternative flame retardant is approved." In June 2007, the state of Maine passed a law "ban[ning] the use of deca-BDE in mattresses and furniture on January 1, 2008 and phas[ing] out its use in televisions and other plastic-cased electronics by January 1, 2010." As of 2007, other states considering restrictions on decaBDE include California, Connecticut, Hawaii, Illinois, Massachusetts, Michigan, Minnesota, Montana, New York, and Oregon.

On December 17, 2009, as the result of negotiations with EPA, the two U.S. producers of decabromodiphenyl ether (decaBDE), Albemarle Corporation and Chemtura Corporation, and the largest U.S. importer, ICL Industrial Products, Inc., announced commitments to phase out voluntarily decaBDE in the United States by the end of 2013.

== Alternatives ==
A number of reports have examined alternatives to decaBDE as a flame retardant. At least three U.S. states have evaluated decaBDE alternatives:

- Washington concluded in 2006 that "there do not appear to be any obvious alternatives to Deca-BDE that are less toxic, persistent and bioaccumulative and have enough data available for making a robust assessment" and that "there is much more data available on Deca-BDE than for any of the alternatives."
- Maine in January 2007 stated that bisphenol A diphenyl phosphate (also known as BDP, BPADP, bisphenol A diphosphate, or BAPP) "is not a suitable alternative to decaBDE" because "one of the degradation products is bisphenol A, a potent endocrine disruptor." The report listed resorcinol bis(diphenyl phosphate) (also known as RDP), magnesium hydroxide, and other chemicals as alternatives to decaBDE that are "most likely to be used."
- A March 2007 report from Illinois categorized decaBDE alternatives as "Potentially Unproblematic," "Potentially Problematic," "Insufficient Data," and "Not Recommended." The "Potentially Unproblematic" alternatives were BAPP, RDP, aluminum trihydroxide, and magnesium hydroxide.
