= Congener (chemistry) =

Related substances

A group of carcinogenic organic compounds, polychlorinated biphenyls (PCBs), is an example of a congener grouping. The number and locations of Cl groups can vary.

In chemistry, congeners are chemical substances "related to each other by origin, structure, or function".

== Common origin and structure ==
Any significant quantity of a polyhalogenated compound is by default a blend of multiple molecule types because each molecule forms independently, and chlorine and bromine do not strongly select which site(s) they bond to.

- Polychlorinated biphenyls (PCBs) are a family of 209 congeners.
- Polybrominated biphenyls and polychlorinated diphenyl ethers are also families of 209 congeners.

Similarly polychlorinated dibenzodioxins, polychlorinated dibenzofurans, polychlorinated terphenyls, polychlorinated naphthalene, polychloro phenoxy phenol, and polybrominated diphenyl ethers (PBDEs) (pentabromodiphenyl ether, octabromodiphenyl ether, decabromodiphenyl ether), etc. are also groups of congeners.

== Common origin ==
- Congener (alcohol), substances other than alcohol (desirable or undesirable) also produced during fermentation.
- Congeners of oleic acids can modify cell membrane behavior, protecting against tumors or having effects on blood pressure.

== Common structure ==
Congeners can refer to similar compounds that substitute other elements with similar valences, yielding molecules having similar structures. Examples:

- potassium chloride and sodium chloride may be considered congeners; also potassium chloride and potassium fluoride.
- hydrogen peroxide (HOOH), hydrogen thioperoxide (HSOH), and hydrogen disulfide (HSSH).

Structural analogs are often isoelectronic.

== Other ==
- Congeners refer to the various oxidation states of a given element in a compound. For example, titanium(II) chloride (titanium dichloride), titanium(III) chloride (titanium trichloride), and titanium(IV) chloride (titanium tetrachloride) may be considered congeners.
- Congeners can refer to other elements in the same group in the periodic table. For example, congeners of the Group 11 element copper are silver and gold, sometimes found together in the same ores (porphyry copper deposit) due to their chemical similarity.
