= Brominated flame retardant =

Class of chemical compounds

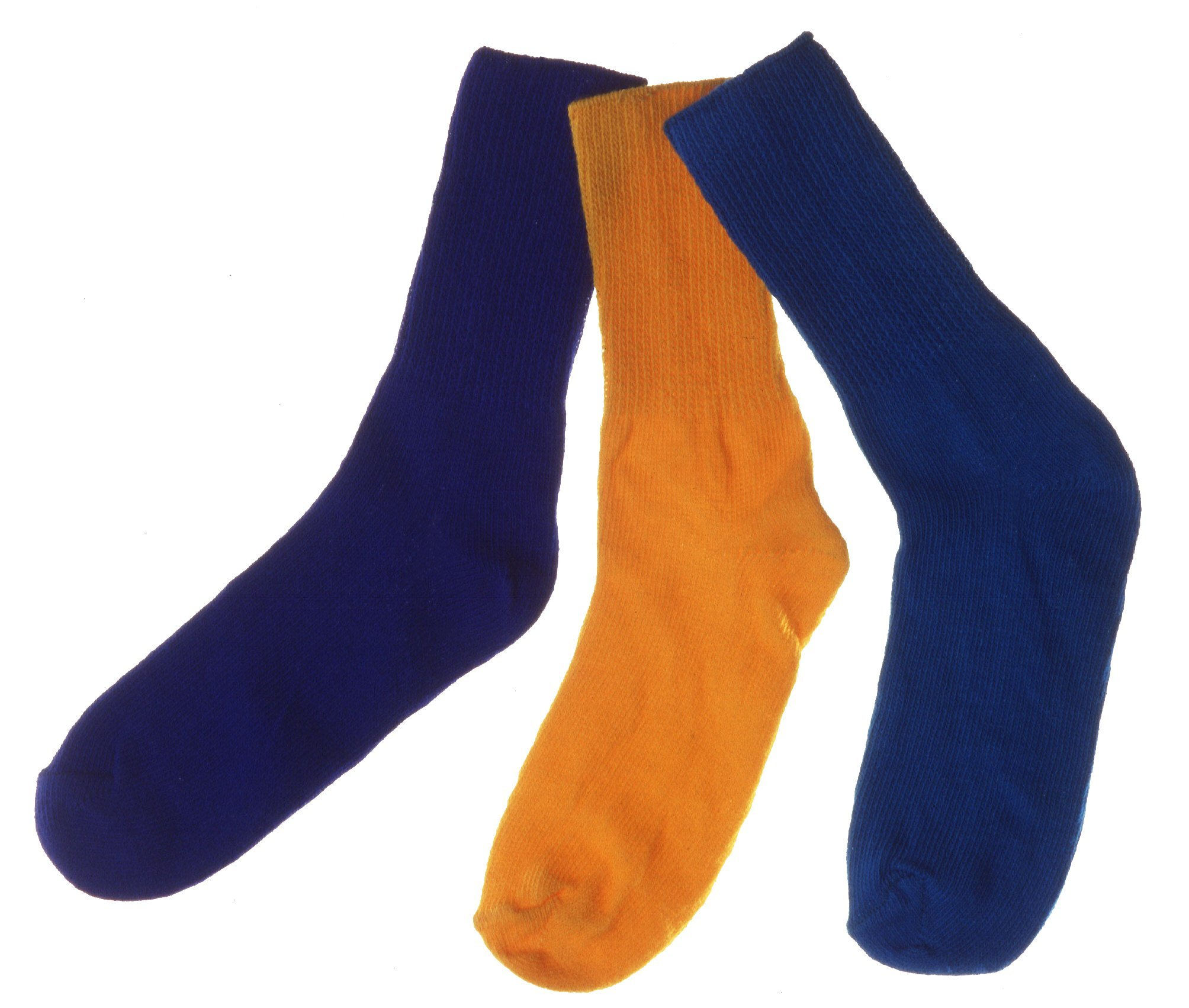
Flame-retardant cotton socks

Brominated flame retardants (BFRs) are organobromine compounds that have an inhibitory effect on combustion chemistry and tend to reduce the flammability of products containing them. The brominated variety of commercialized chemical flame retardants comprise approximately 19.7% of the market. They are effective in plastics and textile applications like electronics, clothes, and furniture. 390,000 tons of brominated flame retardants were sold in 2011.

== Types of compounds ==
Many different BFRs are produced synthetically with widely varying chemical properties. There are several groups:

- Polybrominated diphenyl ethers (PBDEs): DecaBDE, OctaBDE (not manufactured anymore), PentaBDE (not manufactured anymore, the first BFR, commercialized in the 1950s)
- Polybrominated biphenyl (PBB), not manufactured anymore
- Brominated cyclohydrocarbons
- Other brominated flame retardants with different properties and mechanisms

Decabromodiphenyl ether (Deca-BDE or DeBDE) - In August 2012, the UK authorities proposed decabromodiphenyl ether (Deca-BDE or DeBDE) as a candidate for Authorisation under the EU's regulatory regime on chemicals, REACH. On 5 July 2013 ECHA withdrew Deca-BDE from its list of priority substances for Authorisation under REACH, therefore closing the public consultation. On 1 August 2014, ECHA submitted a restriction proposal for Deca-BDE. The agency is proposing a restriction on the manufacture, use and placing on the market of the substance and of mixtures and articles containing it. On 17 September 2014, ECHA submitted the restriction report which initiates a six months public consultation. On 9 February 2017, the European Commission adopted Regulation EU 2017/227. Article 1 of this regulation states that Regulation (EC) No 1907/2006 is amended to include a ban on the use of decaBDE in quantities greater than 0.1% by weight, effective from 2 March 2019. Products placed on the market prior to 2 March 2019 are exempt. Furthermore, the use decaBDE in aircraft is permissible until 2 March 2027.

Hexabromocyclododecane (HBCD or HBCDD) is a ring consisting of twelve carbon atoms with six bromine atoms tied to the ring. The commercially used HBCD is in fact a mixture of different isomers. HBCD is toxic to water-living organisms. The UNEP Stockholm Convention has listed HBCD for elimination, but allowing a temporary exemption for the use in polystyrene insulation foams in buildings.

Tetrabromobisphenol A (TBBPA or TBBP-A) is mainly used in printed circuit boards, as a reactive flame retardant. Since TBBPA is chemically bound to the resin of the printed circuit board, it is less easily released than the loosely applied mixtures in foams such that an EU risk assessment concluded in 2005 that TBBPA poses no risk to human health in that application. TBBPA is also used as an additive in acrylonitrile butadiene styrene (ABS).

== Contents in plastics ==
Content of brominated flame retardants in different polymers:

Polymer	Content [%]	Substances
Polystyrene foam	0.8–4	HBCD
High impact polystyrene	11–15	DecaBDE, brominated polystyrene
Epoxy resin	0-0.1	TBBPA
Polyamides	13–16	DecaBDE, brominated polystyrene
Polyolefins	5–8	DecaBDE, propylene dibromo styrene
Polyurethanes	n/a	No brominated FR available
Polyterephthalate	8–11	Brominated polystyrene
Unsaturated polyesters	13–28	TBBPA
Polycarbonate	4–6	Brominated polystyrene
Styrene copolymers	12–15	Brominated polystyrene

== Types of applications ==
The electronics industry accounts for the greatest consumption of BFRs. In computers, BFRs are used in four main applications: in printed circuit boards, in components such as connectors, in plastic covers, and in electrical cables. BFRs are also used in a multitude of products, including, but not exclusively, plastic covers of television sets, carpets, pillows, paints, upholstery, and domestic kitchen appliances.

== Environmental and safety issues ==
Generally, governments have determined that brominated fire retardants are not harmful to human health in the exposure amounts assessed. Ingestion of house dust accounts for 80-90% of total PBDE exposure, while the remaining exposure occurs from food ingestion. PBDE-contaminated foods, particularly those high in fat content, such as fatty meats or fish, are possible sources of exposure. In breastfeeding infants, breast milk may be an exposure source because PBDEs can be present in the mother and her milk. Various other food items may contain PBDEs, including meat, meat products, dairy products, fish and other seafood.

== See also ==
- Tris(2,3-dibromopropyl) phosphate
