= Triclocarban =

Antimicrobial agent

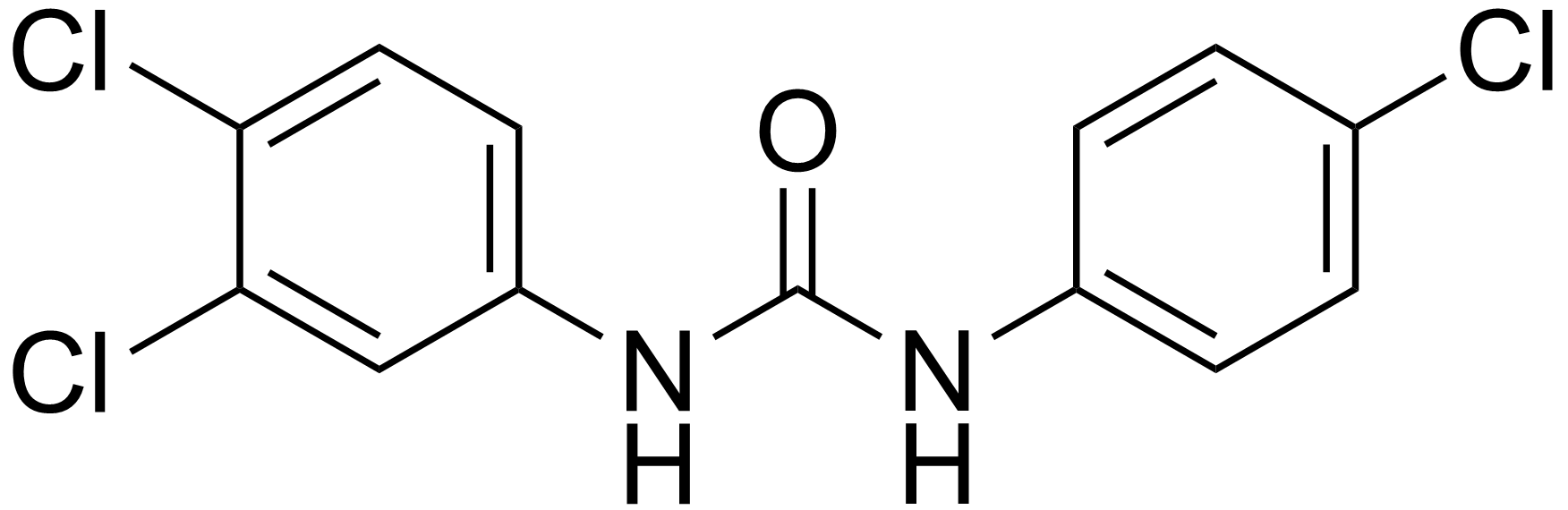

Names
- Preferred IUPAC name N-(4-Chlorophenyl)-N′-(3,4-dichlorophenyl)urea
- Other names Trichlorocarbanilide, TCC, Solubacter, Vivilide

Identifiers
CAS Number	101-20-2
3D model (JSmol)	Interactive image
ChEBI	CHEBI:48347
ChEMBL	ChEMBL1076347
ChemSpider	7266
ECHA InfoCard	100.002.659
PubChem CID	7547
UNII	BGG1Y1ED0Y
CompTox Dashboard (EPA)	DTXSID4026214
- InChI: InChI=1S/C13H9Cl3N2O/c14-8-1-3-9(4-2-8)17-13(19)18-10-5-6-11(15)12(16)7-10/h1-7H,(H2,17,18,19) Key: ICUTUKXCWQYESQ-UHFFFAOYSA-N; InChI=1/C13H9Cl3N2O/c14-8-1-3-9(4-2-8)17-13(19)18-10-5-6-11(15)12(16)7-10/h1-7H,(H2,17,18,19) Key: ICUTUKXCWQYESQ-UHFFFAOYAL
- SMILES: Clc2ccc(NC(=O)Nc1ccc(Cl)cc1)cc2Cl

Properties
Chemical formula	C_{13}H_{9}Cl_{3}N_{2}O
Molar mass	315.58 g·mol^{−1}
Density	1.53 g/cm^{3}
Melting point	254 to 256 °C (489 to 493 °F; 527 to 529 K)

Hazards
NFPA 704 (fire diamond)	0 1 0
Flash point	> 150 °C (302 °F; 423 K)
- Lethal dose or concentration (LD, LC)
LD_{50} (median dose)	>5000 mg/kg (oral, mouse); 2100 mg/kg (i.p., mouse)
- Except where otherwise noted, data are given for materials in their standard state (at 25 °C [77 °F], 100 kPa). verify (what is ?) Infobox references

Triclocarban (sometimes abbreviated as TCC) is an antibacterial chemical once common in, but now phased out of, personal care products like soaps and lotions. It was originally developed for the medical field. Although the mode of action is unknown, TCC can be effective in fighting infections by targeting the growth of bacteria such as Staphylococcus aureus. Additional research seeks to understand its potential for causing antibacterial resistance and its effects on organismal and environmental health.

== Usage ==
Triclocarban has been used as an antimicrobial and antifungal compound since the 1960s. It was commonly found in personal care products as an antimicrobial in soaps, lotions, deodorants, toothpaste, and plastic. As of 2005 about 80% of all antimicrobial bar soap sold in the United States contained triclocarban. In 2011 United States consumers were spending nearly 1 billion dollars annually on products containing triclocarban and triclosan.

In December 2013, the Food and Drug Administration (FDA) required all companies to prove within the next year, that triclocarban is not harmful to consumers. Companies like Johnson & Johnson, Procter & Gamble, Colgate-Palmolive, and Avon began phasing out antibacterial ingredients due to health concerns.

By 2016 usage of triclocarban in soaps had declined to 40%, and that September the FDA banned triclocarban, triclosan and 17 other common antibacterial chemicals by September 2017, for their failure to be proven safe, or more effective than plain soap and water.

== Chemical structure and properties ==
Triclocarban, 3-(4-chlorophenyl)-1-(3,4-dichlorophenyl)urea, is a white powder that is insoluble in water. While triclocarban has two chlorinated phenyl rings, it is structurally similar to carbanilide compounds often found in pesticides (such as diuron) and some drugs. Chlorination of ring structures is often associated with hydrophobicity, persistence in the environment, and bioaccumulation in fatty tissues of living organisms. For this reason, chlorine is also a common component of persistent organic pollutants. Triclocarban is incompatible with strong oxidizing reagents and strong bases, reaction with which could result in safety concerns such as explosion, toxicity, gas, and heat.

=== Synthesis of triclocarban ===
There are two commercial routes used for the production of triclocarban, using the reaction of isocyanates with nucleophiles such as amines to form ureas:

1. 4-chlorophenylisocyanate is reacted with 3,4-dichloroaniline
2. 3,4-dichlorophenylisocyanate is reacted with 4-chloroaniline

The purity specification in the draft USP monograph for triclocarban is: not less than 97.0% w/w. The purity of commercial production is greater, 98% w/w.

== Mechanism of action ==
=== Bacteria ===
Triclocarban is predominantly active against gram positive bacteria (bacteria with a thick peptidoglycan wall). The precise mechanism of action of triclocarban is unknown, but it is shown to be bacteriostatic, which prevents bacterial proliferation.

=== Humans ===
The specific mechanism of action for triclocarban's health effects on humans, like in bacteria, is unclear. Generally, in vitro, triclocarban enhances the gene expression of other steroid hormones, including androgens, estrogens, and cortisol. It is hypothesized that the compound acts similar to cofactors or coactivators that modulate the activity of estrogen receptors and androgen receptors. Experiments show that triclocarban activates constitutive androstane receptor and estrogen receptor alpha both in vivo and in vitro and might have the potential to alter normal physiological homeostasis. Activation of these receptors amplifies gene expression and, in doing so, may be the mechanistic base of triclocarban's health impact on humans. However, further investigation is needed to determine whether triclocarban increases the activity of sex steroid hormones by binding to the receptors or by binding to and sensitizing the receptor coactivators.

== Antibacterial properties ==
Triclocarban acts to treat both initial bacterial skin and mucosal infections as well as those infections at risk for superinfection. In vitro, triclocarban has been found to be effective against various strains of staphylococcus, streptococcus, and enterococcus bacteria. It has been shown to be effective as an antibacterial even at very low levels. Triclocarban's minimum inhibitory concentration has been found to range from 0.5 to 8 mg/L for these various strains. Triclocarban is unquestionably bacteriostatic only for gram-positive bacteria such as Staphylococcus aureus, which suggests that the mechanism of triclocarban's antibacterial activity is through its destabilization of bacterial cell walls.

=== Resistance ===
Exposure of organisms like fish, algae, and humans to low levels of triclocarban and other antibacterial chemicals kills weak microbes and allows the stronger, resistant strains to proliferate. As microbes share genes, an increase in resistant strains increases the probability that weak microbes acquire these resistance genes. The consequence is a new colony of drug resistant microbes.

When resistant microbes are exposed to antimicrobials, they increase their expression of genes that confer this resistance. The risk of bacterial antibiotic resistance has been studied by quantitatively monitoring the abundance of the tetQ gene in wastewater microcosms. As tetQ is the most common resistance gene in the environment and encodes for ribosomal protection proteins, the amount that it expresses correlates with the amount of resistance in a microbial population. The addition of triclocarban was shown to increase the expression of this tetQ gene.

TetQ gene expression in bacteria was also found to be significantly increased when multiple antimicrobials such as tetracycline, triclosan, and triclocarban were added to an experimental system at the same time. Combining these compounds affects resistance by creating a situation where co-selection (or natural selection by more than one reagent) for resistance genes occurs. The complex nature of microbial communities and the multitude of antibiotics present in aquatic environments often leads to this sort of dynamic selection event and the multiple resistance patterns seen in naturally occurring bacteria.

== Environmental fate ==
When triclocarban is manufactured, 139 toxic, carcinogenic byproducts, such as 4-chloroaniline and 3,4-dichloroaniline, are released. More of these carcinogens can be released upon chemical, physical and biological attack of triclocarban. The duration of triclocarban chemical in personal product use is relatively short. Upon disposal, the triclocarban is washed down the drain to municipal wastewater treatment plants, where about 97-98% of triclocarban is removed from the water.

Discharge of effluent from these treatment plants and disposal of sludge on land is the primary route of environmental exposure to triclocarban. Research shows that triclocarban and triclosan have been detected in sewage effluents and sludge (biosolids) due to their incomplete removal during wastewater treatment. Due to their hydrophobic nature, significant amounts of them in wastewater streams partition into sludge, with concentrations at mg/kg levels. The volume of triclocarban reentering the environment in sewage sludge after initial successful capture from wastewater is s 127,000 ± 194,000 kg/yr. This is equivalent to a 4.8 – 48.2% of its total U.S. consumption volume. Crops shown to take up antimicrobials from soil include barley, meadow fescue, carrots and pinto beans. Studies show that substantial quantities of triclocarban (227,000 – 454,000 kg/y) can break through wastewater treatment plants and damage algae on surface waters.

== Environmental concerns ==
=== Waste water ===
High concentrations of triclocarban may be found in wastewater. As of 2011 it was among the top ten most commonly detected organic wastewater compounds in terms of frequency and concentration. Triclocarban has been found in increasing concentrations over the past five years and is now more frequently detected than triclosan.

=== Wildlife toxicity ===
Triclocarban has a hazard quotient rating of greater than one, which indicates the potential for adverse effects on organisms due to toxicity. As triclocarban is found in high concentrations in aquatic environments, there are concerns regarding its toxicity to aquatic species. Specifically, triclocarban has been shown to be toxic to amphibians, fish, invertebrates, and aquatic plants, and traces of the compound have been found in Atlantic dolphins. Triclocarban may disrupt hormones critical to the developmental and endocrine processes in exposed animal wildlife. The neurological and reproductive systems are particularly affected through contact with this compound. Triclocarban may also affect animal wildlife behavior. For example, triclosan and triclocarban are 100–1,000 times more effective in inhibiting and killing algae, crustaceans, and fish than they are in killing microbes. Triclocarban and triclosan have been observed in multiple organisms, including algae, aquatic blackworms, fish, and dolphins.

=== Bioaccumulation ===
Triclocarban bioaccumulation is possible in a number of organisms. Earthworms are known to store this chemical in their bodies and, because of their ecological role as a food source, they have the potential to move triclocarban up the food chain. Microbial species found in soils also bioaccumulate triclocarban. However, the health of these microbes has not been found to be affected by the presence of the chemical. Triclocarban is rapidly accumulated in both algae and adult caged snails. Moreover, triclocarban is more likely than triclosan to bioaccumulate in aquatic organisms.

Bioaccumulation occurs in plants treated with water containing triclocarban. However, it is estimated that less than 0.5% of the acceptable daily intake of triclocarban for humans is represented by vegetable consumption. Thus, the concentration of triclocarban in edible portions of plants is a negligible exposure pathway for humans.

The potential for triclocarban to bioaccumulate in plants has been exploited in the construction of wetlands meant to help remove triclocarban from wastewater. These constructed wetlands are considered a cost-effective treatment option for the removal of PPCPs, including triclocarban and triclosan, from domestic water effluent. Such compounds tend to concentrate in the roots of wetland plants. Potential ecological risks associated with this method are the decrease of root systems in wetland plants, reduced nutrient uptake, decreased competitive ability, and increased potential for uprooting. Due to these risks, the long term exposure of wetland ecosystems to wastewater containing triclocarban as a major solution to wastewater pollution is still under discussion.

== Health concerns ==
=== Personal care ===
One study has investigated how triclocarban remains in the human system after using a bar of soap with traces of triclocarban. Analysis of urine samples from human test subjects shows that, after triclocarban has undergone glucuronidation, its oxidative metabolites are less readily excreted than triclocarban itself. This same study performed topical treatments of triclocarban on rats and, by analyzing urine and plasma levels, demonstrated that triclocarban does remain in the organism's system.

=== Endocrine disorders ===
Triclocarban induces weak responses mediated by aryl hydrocarbon, estrogen, and androgen receptors in vitro. This has yet to be confirmed in vivo. In vitro, the dihydrotestosterone-dependent activation of androgen receptor-responsive gene expression is enhanced by triclocarban by up to 130%. Triclocarban is also a potent inhibitor of the enzyme soluble epoxide hydrolase (sEH) in vitro. Additionally, triclocarban amplifies the bioactivity of testosterone and other androgens. This increased activity may have adverse implications for reproductive health. Triclocarban studies on rats exhibited increased size of the specimens' prostate glands. The amplification of sex hormones could promote the growth of breast and prostate cancer.

The chemical toxicity of triclocarban with respect to lethality is low (LD_{50} >5000 mg/kg). Its rate of skin absorption is also low. Repeated low-dose exposure, however, can cause endocrine disruption over time.

== Safety ==
Spillage may increase the risk of human, ecological, and environmental exposure to triclocarban. Immediate removal and restraint of the spill, including triclocarban as dust, is urged. Although triclocarban has few to no direct detrimental effects on health aside from allergic reactions, preventing exposure to triclocarban is recommended. Since triclocarban enters the body through pores, wearing gloves, properly washing hands, and overall proper hygiene reduces the risk of skin exposure and irritation. High concentrations of triclocarban dust may remain in the lungs and inhibit lung and respiratory function. For individuals with prior respiratory conditions, triclocarban exacerbates the severity of respiratory diseases, and proper protection is recommended as a precaution. In case of exposure to triclocarban, the individual is suggested to wash the area with water or to clear the respiratory pathways. In addition to its adverse effects on humans and the environment, solid triclocarban is a fire hazard. It is particularly combustible as dust. Contamination with other oxidizing agents may also result in combustion.

== Policy ==
The Food and Drug Administration began to review the safety of triclocarban and triclosan in the 1970s, but due to the difficulties of finding antimicrobial alternatives, no final policy, or "drug monograph," was established. Legal action by the Natural Resources Defense Council in 2010 forced the FDA to review triclocarban and triclosan. The United States Environmental Protection Agency maintains regulatory control over triclocarban and triclosan.

On September 2, 2016, the Food and Drug Administration announced that triclosan and triclocarban must be removed from all antibacterial soap products by late 2017. Triclocarban is similar in its use and adverse health impacts as triclosan, and hexachlorophene which was already prohibited by the FDA.

== Current research ==
Scientists are searching for more sustainable antimicrobials that maintain their effectiveness while being minimally toxic to the environment, humans, and wildlife. This entails low degrees of bioaccumulation and rapid, clean biodegradation in existing wastewater treatment facilities. A lowered potential or no potential for resistance is also preferable. These next generation chemicals should aim to act on a broad spectrum of microbes and pathogens while also being minimally toxic and bioaccumulating in non-target species.

Synthesis of these compounds could be improved upon by finding renewable sources for their production that lacks occupational hazards. Research into sustainable chemical production is helping to formulate green pharmaceuticals. These same principles may be applied to the development of improved antimicrobials. Developments in this area would benefit both people and the environment.

== See also ==
- Antibacterial soap
- Chlorine
- Dial (soap)
- Prostate cancer
- Bioaccumulation
- Breast cancer
- Triclosan
- Sludge
- Hand sanitizer
- Deodorant
- Sewage treatment
