= C7H3Cl2NO =

The molecular formula C_{7}H_{3}Cl_{2}NO may refer to:

- Chloroxynil
- 3,4-Dichlorophenyl isocyanate
