= Jinkanpo Atsugi Incinerator =

Waste incinerator in Kanagawa, Japan

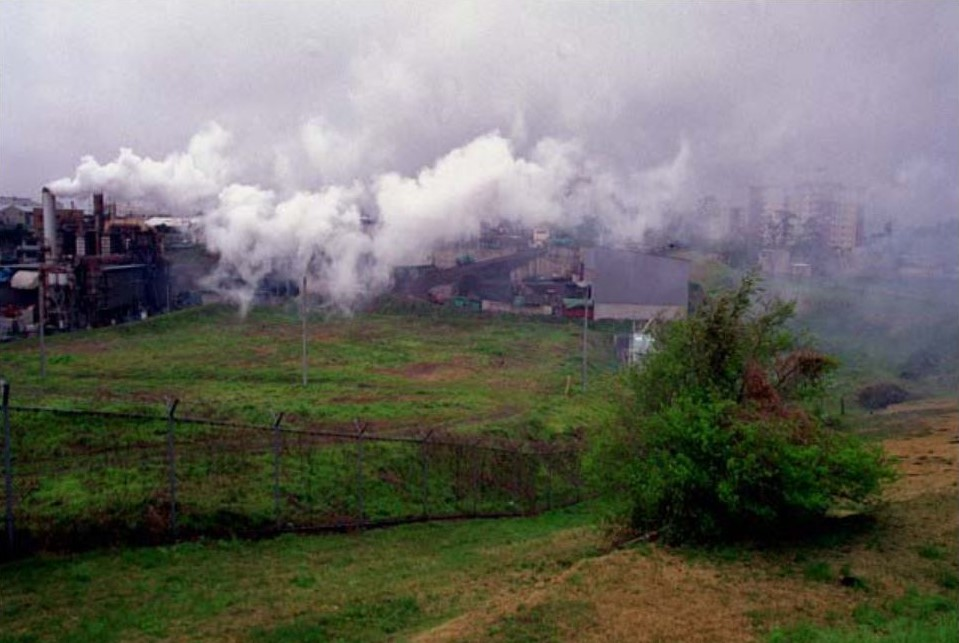
Enviro-Tech (Formerly Shinkampo) Incinerator (left) Fumigates NAF Atsugi Military Housing (right).

The Enviro-Tech Incinerator Complex (Atsugi Incinerator) was a waste incinerator located in Ayase, Kanagawa Prefecture, Japan, (formerly Jinkanpo/Shinkampo). It began operation on March 3, 1980 and was closed on April 30, 2001. The incinerator was located about 150 meters south of Naval Air Facility Atsugi, a base manned partly by several thousand United States Navy members and their families.

Throughout its history, the incinerator complex reportedly blew toxic and cancerous emissions over the neighboring base facilities, contaminating the base, especially the housing area, with dioxin, particulate matter, heavy metals, and other toxicants. A comprehensive air and soil sampling study conducted from 1998-1999 revealed the presence of 246 chemicals, with over 48 surpassing EPA health protective guidelines and regulations, including numerous known and suspected carcinogens. The incinerator's owners, arrested and jailed for charges of tax evasion, neglected the maintenance of the facility and operated without proper emissions control devices.

Headaches, eye irritation and respiratory conditions were commonly reported by base residents. Many families also report having experienced a miscarriage while stationed at NAF Atsugi. Starting in 1998, a formal risk management plan was implemented that required service members and accompanied family members to undergo medical screenings before being stationed at the base in order to ensure that they had no medical condition that would be worsened by the poor air quality. If so, they were deemed ineligible to transfer.

== Pollutants and health impacts ==
According to the Final Human Health Risk Assessment, by the U.S. Navy and Marine Crops Force Health Protection Command, inhalation was the primary exposure route, accounting for over 95% of the non-cancer hazard index and more than 80% of the cancer risk. The report concluded that the hazard index for the respiratory system exceeded 1 in nearly all assessed scenarios, with children in residential settings facing the highest risk, with an average Hazard Index of approximately 53, and a Reasonable Maximum Exposure of approximately 67.

These emissions had a direct impact on the nearby Naval Air Facility Atsugi due to the site's proximity and topographic conditions. Located approximately 150 meters south of the base and in valley, the incinerator's chimneys were relatively low. This topography and meteorology, specifically the prevailing southerly winds in spring and summer, frequently carried the pollution plume over the base. As confirmed by air monitoring data, pollutant concentrations and associated health risks were significantly higher at downwind locations than at upwind ones. Notably, the contribution of dioxin (TCDD-TEQ) to the total cancer risk increased markedly in these downwind areas.

Closure

In April 2001, the Japanese government purchased the plant for nearly 40 million dollars and shut it down following a United States Department of Justice lawsuit against the private incinerator owner. Dismantling was completed by the end of that year.

Post-Closure

In the years and decades following closure of the complex, many former residents of NAF Atsugi have reported a variety of cancers and non-cancer diseases. In June, 2007, the USN's Environmental Health Center announced that it would conduct a study of the health population of those stationed at NAF Atsugi during the time the incinerator was in operation. The resulting study, titled "Naval Air Facility (NAF) Atsugi Japan Health Study Report" was completed in June 2009, comparing Atsugi resident health outcomes to those of another U.S. military base in Japan. The Navy’s study found no difference in the studied cancer rates and no ocular or respiratory differences, although, it did find an increase in dermatological disorders among former NAF Atsugi residents. Critics of this study argue that it was conducted during an immature cancer latency period and did not evaluate all relevant cancers or non-cancer diseases. Since most cancers linked to an exposure generally require a 20-30 year latency period before they are likely to manifest, the timing of the study would not have been ideal for observing cancer development, or other latent health conditions.

In June 2009 following a brief by Navy Medicine, the DOD-V.A. Deployment Health Working Group agreed the V.A. would receive a list of all affected active-duty personnel stationed at NAF Atsugi from 1985 to 2001. The VA subsequently added the Atsugi exposure to the October 2009 Compensation & Pension Bulletin, an April 2010 VBA training letter titled: “Environmental Hazards in Iraq, Afghanistan, and Other Military Installations”, a feature in the M21-1 Adjudication Procedures Manual, and created a webpage acknowledging the exposure. However, as of early 2025, the VA has not conducted any follow-up or medical surveillance of the NAF Atsugi population.
