= Antibacterial (disambiguation) =

Antibacterial usually refers to an antibiotic, a principal type of antimicrobial agent used mainly against bacteria; it may kill or inhibit them.

Antibacterial may also refer to:

- Antiseptic, a principal type of antimicrobial agent used mainly against bacteria; it may kill or inhibit them
- Disinfectant, an agent to impair microbes in cleaning/sanitation but not taken internally as medicine; it may kill or inhibit them
- Bactericide, an agent that kills bacteria populations
- Bacteriostatic agent, an agent that does not kill bacteria populations but inhibits their growth
- Antibacterial soap, whose active ingredient may be any of the above

== See also ==
- Antimicrobial, any agent against any type of microbe
