= Antibacterial soap =

Cleaning agents containing germ-killing chemicals

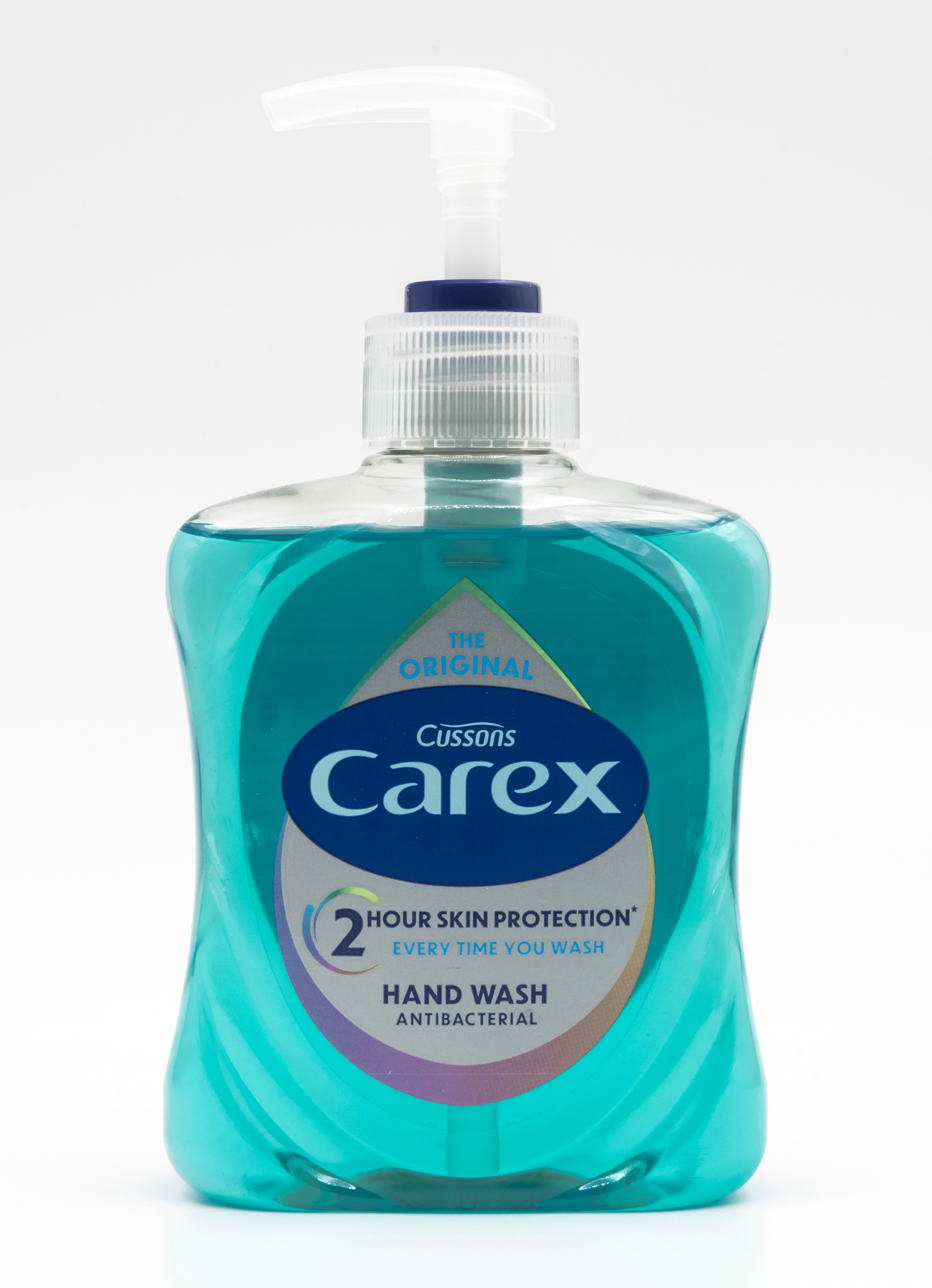
A dispenser of Carex liquid soap marketed as "antibacterial"

Antibacterial soap is a soap which contains chemical ingredients that purportedly assist in killing bacteria. The majority of antibacterial soaps contain triclosan, though other chemical additives are also common. The effectiveness of products branded as being antibacterial has been disputed by some academics as well as the U.S. Food and Drug Administration (FDA).

== History ==
The earliest antibacterial soap was carbolic soap, which used up to 5% phenols (carbolic acid). Fears about the safety of carbolic soaps chemical components on the skin brought about a ban on some of these chemical components. Triclosan and other antibacterial agents have long been used in commercial cleaning products for hospitals and other healthcare settings, however they began to be used in home cleaning products during the 1990s.

== Ingredients ==
Triclosan and triclocarban are the most common compounds used as antibacterials in soaps. However, other common antibacterial ingredients in soaps include benzalkonium chloride, benzethonium chloride, and chloroxylenol.

== Effectiveness ==
Claims that antibacterial soap is effective stem from the long-standing knowledge that triclosan can inhibit the growth of various bacteria, as well as some fungi. However, more recent reviews have suggested that antibacterial soaps are no better than regular soaps at preventing illness or reducing bacteria on the hands of users.

In September 2016, the U.S. Food and Drug Administration banned the use of the common antibacterial ingredients triclosan and triclocarban, and 17 other ingredients frequently used in "antibacterial" soaps and washes, due to insufficient information on the long-term health effects of their use and a lack of evidence on their effectiveness. The FDA stated "There is no data demonstrating that over-the-counter antibacterial soaps are better at preventing illness than washing with plain soap and water". The agency also asserted that despite requests for such information, the FDA did not receive sufficient data from manufacturers on the long-term health effects of these chemicals. This ban does not apply to hand sanitizer. This is due to the fact that hand sanitizer typically utilizes alcohol to kill microbes rather than triclosan or similar ingredients.

A 2017 statement by 200 scientists and medics published in the scientific journal Environmental Health Perspectives warns that anti-bacterial soaps and gels are useless and may cause harm. The statement also cautioned against the use of antimicrobial agents in food contact materials, textiles, and paints. British firm Unilever claimed in 2017 to be phasing triclosan and triclocarban out of their products by the end of the year, adding they would be replaced by “a range of alternatives, including natural and nature-inspired antibacterial ingredients”.

Claims have been made in the media that antibacterial soap is more effective than plain soap in the prevention of the SARS-CoV-2 virus. The CDC and the Food and Drug Administration both recommend plain soap; there is no evidence that antibacterial soaps are any better, and limited evidence that they might be worse long-term.

== See also ==
- Antiseptic
- Disinfectant
- Antimicrobial resistance
