= Polyhalogenated compound =

Type of organic compound

A polyhalogenated compound (PHC) is any compound with multiple substitutions of halogens. They are of particular interest and importance because they bioaccumulate in humans, and comprise a superset of which has many toxic and carcinogenic industrial chemicals as members. PBDEs, PCBs, dioxins (PCDDs) and PFCs are all polyhalogenated compounds. They are generally non-miscible in organic solvents or water, but miscible in some hydrocarbons from which they often derive.

== Uses ==
PHCs are used in a vast array of manufactured products, from wood treatments to cookware coatings, to non-stick, waterproof, and fire-resistant coatings, cosmetics, medicine, electronic fluids, food containers, and wrappings, in everything from furniture and furnishings, automobiles, airplanes, plastics, clothing and cloth, surgery, insulation, adhesives, paints, sealants, lubricating oils, polyurethane foams, cancer therapy, and medical imaging. They are also heavily used in pest control.

== Safety ==
PHCs include notoriously dangerous substances, including Agent Orange, DDT, and other pesticides. Many non-pesticide PHCs have the same safety issues as pesticides.

== Types ==
- Polycholorinated, e.g. PCBs, dioxins (PCDDs), hexachlorophene, dibenzofurans (PCDFs), polychloro phenoxy phenols (PCPPs), polychlorinated diphenyl ethers (PCDEs).
- Polybrominated, e.g., PBDEs, polybrominated biphenyls (PBBs).
- Perfluorinated compounds
- Polyiodinated compounds

== Breakdown of compounds ==
Despite bioaccumulating in humans, it has been claimed that a method during manufacture using anaerobic bacteria may be efficacious
