= Triclosan =

Antimicrobial agent

Names
- Preferred IUPAC name 5-Chloro-2-(2,4-dichlorophenoxy)phenol
- Other names 2,4,4′-Trichloro-2′-hydroxydiphenyl ether 5-Chloro-(2,4-dichlorophenoxy)phenol; Trichloro-2′-hydroxydiphenyl ether CH-3565; Lexol 300; Irgasan DP 300; Ster-Zac

Identifiers
CAS Number	3380-34-5
3D model (JSmol)	Interactive image
ChEBI	CHEBI:164200
ChEMBL	ChEMBL849
ChemSpider	5363
DrugBank	DB08604
ECHA InfoCard	100.020.167
KEGG	D06226
PubChem CID	5564
UNII	4NM5039Y5X
CompTox Dashboard (EPA)	DTXSID5032498
- InChI: InChI=1S/C12H7Cl3O2/c13-7-1-3-11(9(15)5-7)17-12-4-2-8(14)6-10(12)16/h1-6,16H Key: XEFQLINVKFYRCS-UHFFFAOYSA-N; InChI=1/C12H7Cl3O2/c13-7-1-3-11(9(15)5-7)17-12-4-2-8(14)6-10(12)16/h1-6,16H Key: XEFQLINVKFYRCS-UHFFFAOYAS
- SMILES: Clc2cc(Cl)ccc2Oc1ccc(Cl)cc1O

Properties
Chemical formula	C_{12}H_{7}Cl_{3}O_{2}
Molar mass	289.54 g·mol^{−1}
Appearance	White solid
Density	1.49 g/cm^{3}
Melting point	55–57 °C (131–135 °F; 328–330 K)
Boiling point	120 °C (248 °F; 393 K)

Pharmacology
ATC code	D08AE04 (WHO) D09AA06 (WHO) (medicated dressing)

Hazards
NFPA 704 (fire diamond)	2 1 0
Flash point	162.2 °C (324.0 °F; 435.3 K)
Safety data sheet (SDS)	MSDS
- Except where otherwise noted, data are given for materials in their standard state (at 25 °C [77 °F], 100 kPa). verify (what is ?) Infobox references

Triclosan (sometimes abbreviated as TCS) is an antibacterial and antifungal agent present in some consumer products, including toothpaste, soaps, detergents, toys, and surgical cleaning treatments. It is similar in its uses and mechanism of action to triclocarban. Its efficacy as an antimicrobial agent, the risk of antimicrobial resistance, and its possible role in disrupted hormonal development remains controversial. Additional research seeks to understand its potential effects on organisms and environmental health.

== Uses ==
First described in 1964, Triclosan was used as a hospital scrub in the 1970s. Prior to its change in regulatory status in the EU and US, it had expanded commercially and was a common ingredient in soaps (0.10–1.00%), shampoos, deodorants, toothpastes, mouthwashes, cleaning supplies, and pesticides. It also was part of consumer products, including kitchen utensils, toys, bedding, socks, and trash bags.

Triclosan was registered as a pesticide in 1969. US EPA registration numbers are required for all EPA-registered pesticides. As of 2017, there were five registrations for triclosan with the EPA. Currently, there are 20 antimicrobial registrations with the EPA under the regulations of the Federal Insecticide, Fungicide, and Rodenticide Act (FIFRA). The antimicrobial active ingredient is added to a variety of products where it acts to slow or stop the growth of bacteria, fungi, and mildew. In commercial, institutional, and industrial equipment uses, triclosan is incorporated in conveyor belts, fire hoses, dye bath vats, or ice-making equipment as an antimicrobial. Triclosan may be directly applied to commercial HVAC coils, where it prevents microbial growth that contributes to product degradation.

In the United States, by 2000, triclosan and triclocarban (TCC) could be found in 75% of liquid soaps and 29% of bar soaps, and as of 2014 triclosan was used in more than 2,000 consumer products.

In healthcare, triclosan is used in surgical scrubs and hand washes. Use in surgical units is effective with a minimum contact time of approximately two minutes. More recently, showering with 2% triclosan has become a recommended regimen in surgical units for the decolonization of patients whose skin carries methicillin-resistant Staphylococcus aureus (MRSA). Two small uncontrolled case studies reported the use of triclosan correlated with reduction in MRSA infections.

Triclosan is also used in the coatings for some surgical sutures. There is good evidence these triclosan-coated sutures reduce the risk of surgical site infection. The World Health Organization, the American College of Surgeons and the Surgical Infection Society point out the benefit of triclosan-coated sutures in reducing the risk for surgical site infection.

Triclosan has been employed as a selective agent in molecular cloning. A bacterial host transformed by a plasmid harboring a triclosan-resistant mutant FabI gene (mFabI) as a selectable marker can grow in presence of high dose of triclosan in growth media.

=== Effectiveness ===
In surgery, triclosan coated sutures reduce the risk of surgical site infection. Some studies suggest that antimicrobial hand soaps containing triclosan provide a slightly greater bacterial reduction on the hands compared to plain soap. As of 2013, the US FDA had found clear benefit to health for some consumer products containing triclosan, but not in others; for example the FDA had no evidence that triclosan in antibacterial soaps and body washes provides any benefit over washing with regular soap and water.

A Cochrane review of 30 studies concluded that triclosan/copolymer-containing toothpastes produced a 22% reduction in both dental plaque and gingival inflammation when compared with fluoride toothpastes without triclosan/copolymer. There was weak evidence of a reduction in tooth cavities, and no evidence of reduction in periodontitis.

A study of triclosan toothpastes did not find any evidence that it causes an increase in serious adverse cardiac events such as heart attacks.

A study by Colgate-Palmolive found a significant reduction in gingivitis, bleeding, and plaque with the use of triclosan-containing toothpaste. An independent review by the Cochrane group suggests that the reduction in gingivitis, bleeding, and plaque is statistically significant (unlikely to occur by chance) but not clinically significant (unlikely to provide noticeable effects).

Triclosan is used in food storage containers although this use is banned in the European Union since 2010.

Veterinary use as a biocidal product in the EU is governed by the Biocidal Products Directive.

== Chemical structure and properties ==
This organic compound is a white powdered solid with a slight aromatic, phenolic odor. Categorized as a polychloro phenoxy phenol, triclosan is a chlorinated aromatic compound that has functional groups representative of both ethers and phenols. Phenols often demonstrate antibacterial properties. Triclosan is soluble in ethanol, methanol, diethyl ether, and strongly basic solutions such as a 1M sodium hydroxide solution, but only slightly soluble in water. Triclosan can be synthesized from 2,4-dichlorophenol.

=== Synthesis ===
Under a reflux process, 2,4,4'-trichloro-2'-methoxydiphenyl ether is treated with aluminium chloride.

The United States Pharmacopeia formulary has published a monograph for triclosan that sets purity standards.

== Mechanism of action ==
At high concentrations, triclosan acts as a biocide with multiple cytoplasmic and membrane targets. However, at the lower concentrations seen in commercial products, triclosan appears bacteriostatic, and it targets bacteria primarily by inhibiting fatty acid synthesis.

Triclosan binds to bacterial enoyl-acyl carrier protein reductase (ENR) enzyme, which is encoded by the gene fabI. This binding increases the enzyme's affinity for nicotinamide adenine dinucleotide (NAD^{+}). This results in the formation of a stable, ternary complex of ENR-NAD^{+}-triclosan, which is unable to participate in fatty acid synthesis. Fatty acids are necessary for building and reproducing cell membranes. Vertebrates do not have an ENR enzyme and thus are not affected by this mode of action.

Triclosan has also been reported to interact with tubulin and inhibit its polymerization.

=== Endocrine disruptor ===
Triclosan has been found to be a weak endocrine disruptor in rats, though the relevance of this to humans is uncertain. The compound has been found to bind with low affinity to both the androgen receptor and the estrogen receptor, where both agonistic and antagonistic responses have been observed.

=== Efflux pump inducer ===
Triclosan may upregulate or induce efflux pumps in bacteria causing them to become resistant against variety of other antibiotics.

== Exposure ==
Humans are exposed to triclosan through skin absorption when washing hands or in the shower, brushing teeth, using mouthwash or doing dishes, and through ingestion when swallowed. When triclosan is released into the environment, additional exposure to the chemical is possible through ingesting plants grown in soil treated with sewage sludge, or eating fish exposed to it.

An article from the American Society of Agronomy refers to a study done by Monica Mendez et al., in which the researchers irrigated plants with water containing triclosan and months later found it in all edible parts of tomato and onion plants. Triclosan is found to kill a wide spectrum of bacteria, and the researchers are also concerned about the effect it has on the beneficial bacteria in soil.

== Distribution, metabolism, and elimination ==
Once absorbed, triclosan is metabolized by humans primarily through conjugation reactions into glucuronide and sulfate conjugates that are excreted in feces and urine. Pharmacokinetic studies demonstrate that triclosan sulfate and glucuronide may be formed in the liver at approximately equal rates at the environmentally relevant concentration of 1 to 5 microMolar. When concentrations of triclosan are below 1 microMolar, sulfonation is expected to be the major metabolic pathway for elimination.

== Health concerns ==
Because of potential health concerns, due to the possibility of antimicrobial resistance, endocrine disruption and other issues as listed below, triclosan has been designated as a "contaminant of emerging concern (CEC)" by the United States Geological Survey, meaning it is under investigation for public health risk. "Emerging contaminants" can be broadly defined as any synthetic or naturally occurring chemical or any microorganism that is not commonly monitored in the environment but has the potential to enter the environment and cause known or suspected adverse ecological or human health effects. Triclosan is thought to accumulate in wastewater and return to drinking water, thus propagating a buildup that could cause increasing effects with ongoing use.

In the United States, after a decades-long review of the potential health issues from this contaminant of emerging concern, the FDA ruled on September 6, 2016, that 19 active ingredients including triclosan are not generally recognized as safe and effective (GRAS/GRAE). (See policy section below).

=== Allergic ===
Triclosan has been associated with a higher risk of food allergy. This may be because exposure to bacteria reduces allergies, as predicted by the hygiene hypothesis, and not caused by toxicology of triclosan itself. This effect may also occur with chlorhexidine gluconate and chloroxylenol (PCMX), among other antibacterial agents. Other studies have linked triclosan to allergic contact dermatitis in some individuals. Additionally, triclosan concentrations have been associated with allergic sensitization, especially inhalant and seasonal allergens, rather than food allergens.

=== By-product exposure ===
Triclosan can react with the free chlorine in chlorinated tap water to produce lesser amounts of other compounds, such as 2,4-dichlorophenol. Some of these intermediates convert into dioxins upon exposure to UV radiation (from the sun or other sources). The dioxins that can form from triclosan are not thought to be congeners of toxicologic concern for mammals, birds and fish.

=== Hormonal ===
Concerns on the health effects of triclosan have been raised after it was detected in human breast milk, blood, and urine samples. Studies on rats have shown that triclosan exposure modulates estrogen-dependent responses. There have been many studies performed over the years both in vivo and in vitro, in male and female fish and rats and they support the conclusion that triclosan possesses (anti)estrogenic and (anti)androgenic properties depending on species, tissues, and cell types.

Human studies on triclosan and hormone effects are fewer in number than those on animals, but are being conducted. In a 2017 study on 537 pregnant women in China, prenatal triclosan exposure was associated with increased cord testosterone levels in the infants.

== History ==
Triclosan (TCS) was patented in 1964 by Swiss company Ciba-Geigy. The earliest known safety testing began in 1968. It was introduced the next year, mainly for use in hospitals, and was in worldwide production and use by the early 1970s.

In 1997 Ciba-Geigy merged with another Swiss company, Sandoz, to form Novartis. During the merger, Ciba-Geigy's chemical business was spun off to become Ciba Specialty Chemicals, which was acquired in 2008 by chemical giant BASF. BASF currently manufactures TCS under the brand name Irgasan DP300.

== Environmental concerns ==
=== Treatment and disposal ===
Exposure to triclosan in personal product use is relatively short. Upon disposal, triclosan is sent to municipal sewage treatment plants, where, in the United States, about 97–98% of triclosan is removed. Studies show that substantial quantities of triclosan (170,000–970,000 kg/yr) can escape from wastewater treatment plants and damage algae on surface waters. In a study on effluent from wastewater treatment facilities, approximately 75% of triclocarban was present in sewage sludge. This poses a potential environmental and ecological hazard, particularly for aquatic systems. The volume of triclosan, in the United States, re-entering the environment in sewage sludge after initial successful capture from wastewater is 44,000 ± 60,000 kg/yr. Triclosan can attach to other substances suspended in aquatic environments, which potentially endangers marine organisms and may lead to further bioaccumulation. Ozone is considered to be an effective tool for removing triclosan during sewage treatment. As little triclosan is released through plastic and textile household consumer products, these are not considered to be major sources of triclosan contamination.

During wastewater treatment, a portion of triclosan is degraded, while the remainder adsorbs to sewage sludge or exits the plant as effluent. A mass balance in Athens (Greece) Sewage Treatment Plant (2013) showed that 43% of triclosan is accumulated to the primary and secondary sludge, 45% is lost due to degradation while the rest 12% is discharged to the environment via the secondary treated wastewater. In the environment, triclosan may be degraded by microorganisms or react with sunlight, forming other compounds, which include chlorophenols and dioxins.

During 1999 to 2000, US Geological Survey detected TCS in 57.6% of streams and rivers sampled.

=== Bioaccumulation ===
While studies using semi-permeable membrane devices have found that triclosan does not strongly bioaccumulate, methyl-triclosan is comparatively more stable and lipophilic and thus poses a higher risk of bioaccumulation. The ability of triclosan to bioaccumulate is affected by its ionization state in different environmental conditions.

Global warming may increase uptake and effects of triclosan in aquatic organisms.

=== Ecotoxicity ===
Triclosan is toxic to aquatic bacteria at levels found in the environment. It is highly toxic to various types of algae and has the potential to affect the structure of algal communities, particularly immediately downstream of effluents from wastewater treatment facilities that treat household wastewaters. Triclosan has been observed in multiple organisms, including algae, aquatic blackworms, fish, and dolphins. It has also been found in land animals including earthworms and species higher up the food chain. In toxicity experiments with Vibrio fischeri marine bacterium, an EC50 value of TCS equal to 0.22 mg/L has been determined. Few data are available for the long-term toxicity of TCS to algae, daphnids and fish, while enough data are available for its acute toxicity on these groups of organisms.

A 2017 study that used risk quotient (RQ) methodology and evaluated the ecological threat due to the discharge of wastewater containing TCS in European rivers, reported that the probability that RQ values exceeds 1 ranged from 0.2% (for rivers with dilution factor of 1000) to 45% (for rivers with dilution factor 2).

Triclosan favors anaerobic conditions which is typical in soil and sediment. The antimicrobial properties of Triclosan are resistant to anaerobic degradation which is the main contributor to its persistence in the environment.

== Resistance concerns ==
Concern pertains to the potential for cross-resistance (or co-resistance) to other antimicrobials. Numerous studies have been performed and there have been results indicating that the use of biocidal agents, such as triclosan, can cause cross-resistance. A study done in a wide range of bacteria and different classes of antibiotics showed that Pseudomonas aeruginosa and Stenotrophomonas maltophilia, already resistant to triclosan, had increased resistance against antibiotics tetracycline and norfloxacin when exposed to triclosan. Results from a study published in The American Journal of Infection Control showed that exposure to triclosan was associated with a high risk of developing resistance and cross-resistance in Staphylococcus aureus and Escherichia coli. This was not observed with exposure to chlorhexidine or a hydrogen peroxide–based agent (during the conditions in said study).

== Alternatives ==
A comprehensive meta-analysis published in 2007 indicated that, in community settings, plain soap was no less effective than soaps containing triclosan for "preventing infectious illness symptoms and reducing bacterial levels on the hands.".

Nonorganic antibiotics and organic biocides are effective alternatives to triclosan, such as silver and copper ions and nanoparticles.

== Policy ==
In the US, triclosan is regulated as a pesticide by the EPA and as a drug by the FDA. The EPA generally regulates uses on solid surfaces, and FDA regulations cover uses in personal care products.

In 1974, the US FDA began the drug review monograph process for "over-the-counter (OTC) topical antimicrobial products", including triclosan and triclocarban. The advisory panel first met on June 29, 1972, and the agency published its proposed rule on September 13, 1974. The initial rule applied to, "OTC products containing antimicrobial ingredients for topical human use, which includes soaps, surgical scrubs, skin washes, skin cleansers, first aid preparations and additional products defined by the panel." The proposed rule lists dozens of products that were already on the market at the time and the firms that produced them.

In 1978 the FDA published a tentative final monograph (TFM) for topical antimicrobial products. The record was re-opened in March 1979 to take into account six comments the agency received during the period for submitting objections to the TFM, including new data submitted by Procter & Gamble on the safety and effectiveness of triclocarban and by Ciba-Geigy on the proliferation of use of triclosan. The document states that, "significant amounts of new and previously unconsidered data were submitted with each of the above petitions." It was re-opened again in October of that year to permit interested persons to submit further data establishing conditions for the safety, effectiveness and labeling of over-the-counter topical antimicrobial products for human use.

The next document issued was a proposed rule dated June 17, 1994, which states, the "FDA is issuing a notice of proposed rulemaking in the form of an amended tentative final monograph that would establish conditions under which OTC topical health-care antiseptic drug products are generally recognized as safe and effective and not misbranded. The FDA is issuing this notice of proposed rulemaking on topical antimicrobial drug products after considering the public comments on that notice and other information in the administrative record for this rulemaking. The FDA is also requesting data and information concerning the safety and effectiveness of topical antimicrobials for use as hand sanitizers or dips." In the 1994 update to the rule, TCS was effectively removed from the drug category which made it available for use in consumer products.

In 2010, the Natural Resources Defense Council forced the FDA to review triclosan after suing the agency for its inaction. Because the FDA prohibited hexachlorophene, a compound similar to triclosan, Halden and others argued that the FDA should also ban triclosan. On December 17, 2013, the FDA issued a draft rule revoking the generally recognized as safe status of triclosan as an ingredient in hand wash products, citing the need for additional studies of its potential endrocrine and developmental effects; impact on bacterial resistance; and carcinogenic potential.

On September 6, 2016, 44 years after its initial proposed rule, the FDA issued a final rule establishing that 19 active ingredients, including triclosan and triclocarban, used in over-the-counter (OTC) consumer antiseptic products intended for use with water (aka consumer antiseptic washes) are not generally recognized as safe and effective (GRAS/GRAE) and are misbranded, and are new drugs for which approved applications under section 505 of the FD&C Act are required for marketing. Companies have one year to reformulate products without these ingredients, take them off the market or submit a New Drug Application (NDA) for the products. The 19 ingredients are:

- Cloflucarban
- Fluorosalan
- Hexachlorophene
- Hexylresorcinol
- Iodine complex (ammonium ether sulfate and polyoxyethylene sorbitan monolaurate)
- Iodine complex (phosphate ester of alkylaryloxy polyethylene glycol)
- Methylbenzethonium chloride
- Nonylphenoxypoly (ethyleneoxy) ethanoliodine
- Phenol (greater than 1.5 percent)
- Phenol (less than 1.5 percent)
- Poloxamer-iodine complex
- Povidone-iodine 5 to 10 percent
- Secondary amyltricresols
- Sodium oxychlorosene
- Tribromsalan
- Triclocarban
- Triclosan
- Triple dye (an antiseptic applied to the umbilical region of newborn infants)
- Undecoylium chloride iodine complex

In 2015 and 2016 FDA also issued proposed rules to amend the 1994 TFM regarding the safety and effectiveness of OTC health care antiseptics and OTC consumer antiseptic rubs.

The state of Minnesota took action against triclosan in advance of a federal rule. In May 2014, the governor signed a bill banning triclosan-containing products in the state. A CNN article quotes the new law, "In order to prevent the spread of infectious disease and avoidable infections and to promote best practices in sanitation, no person shall offer for retail sale in Minnesota any cleaning product that contains triclosan and is used by consumers for sanitizing or hand and body cleansing." The law went into effect on January 1, 2017. The exceptions to this rule are individual products that have received approval from the US Food and Drug Administration for consumer use.

In light of mounting evidence on the human health and ecotoxic effects of triclosan, some companies reformulated to remove it in advance of regulation: Colgate-Palmolive removed it from Palmolive Dish Soap and Softsoap in 2011 (but it remained in Colgate Total toothpaste until late 2018 or early 2019); Johnson & Johnson removed it from baby products in 2012 and all products in 2015; Procter & Gamble from all products in 2014; in 2014 it was removed from Clearasil and Avon began phasing it out; and Unilever removed it from skin care and cleansing products in 2015, and says oral care by 2017.

In Canada, triclosan is allowed in cosmetics, though FDA's recent announcement has prompted Health Canada spokeswoman Maryse Durette to state in an e-mail to Toronto newspaper The Globe and Mail that, "the government will publish a final assessment of the safety of triclosan 'in the near future' and take further action 'if warranted.'" Health Canada maintains a Cosmetic Ingredient Hotlist, including hundreds of chemicals that are not allowed or whose use is restricted in cosmetics. The list states that triclosan is currently allowed in cosmetics up to 0.3%, and 0.03% in mouthwashes and other oral products with required warnings to avoid swallowing and not for use in children under the age of 12.

Triclosan was not approved by the European Commission as an active substance for use in biocidal products for product-type 1 in January 2016. In the United States, manufacturers of products containing triclosan must indicate its presence on the label. In Europe, triclosan is regulated as a cosmetic preservative and must be listed on the label. Use of triclosan in cosmetic products was restricted by the EU commission in 2014.

== See also ==
- Antibacterial soap
- Benzalkonium chloride
- Breast cancer
- Chloroform
- Chloroxylenol
- Dial (soap)
- Hand sanitizer
- Simple aromatic ring
