= Polychloro phenoxy phenol =

Triclosan

Polychloro phenoxy phenols (polychlorinated phenoxy phenols, PCPPs) are a group of organic polyhalogenated compounds. Among them include triclosan and predioxin which can degrade to produce certains types of dioxins and furans. Notably, however, the particular dioxin formed by degradation of triclosan, 2,8-DCDD, was found to be non-toxic in fish embryos.
