= Polychlorinated diphenyl ethers =

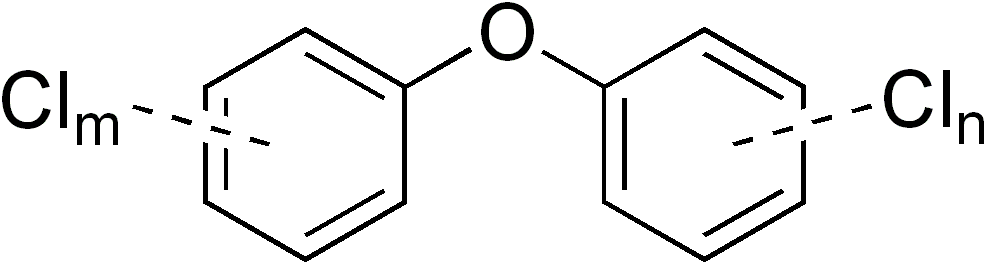
General chemical structure of PCDEs, where the sum n+m ranges from 1 to 10

Polychlorinated diphenyl ethers (PCDEs) are structurally similar to polychlorinated biphenyls (PCBs), both which may be toxic polyhalogenated compounds and some PCDE congeners have been reported to cause toxic responses similar to those caused by some of the non-ortho-substituted PCBs, which are mediated by the aryl hydrocarbon receptor (AhR).

== Congeners ==
The family of PCDEs consists of 209 possible substances, which are called congeners.

number	formula	name	CAS Number	InChIKey
PCDE-1	C_{12}H_{9}ClO	2-chlorodiphenyl ether	2689-07-8	IPBRZLMGGXHHMS-UHFFFAOYSA-N
PCDE-2	C_{12}H_{9}ClO	3-chlorodiphenyl ether	6452-49-9	BMURONZFJJPAOK-UHFFFAOYSA-N
PCDE-3	C_{12}H_{9}ClO	4-chlorodiphenyl ether	7005-72-3	PGPNJCAMHOJTEF-UHFFFAOYSA-N
PCDE-4	C_{12}H_{8}Cl_{2}O	2,2'-dichlorodiphenyl ether	7024-98-8	ZBCGKBWJNUKWNL-UHFFFAOYSA-N
PCDE-5	C_{12}H_{8}Cl_{2}O	2,3-dichlorodiphenyl ether	68486-28-2	VSKSUBSGORDMQX-UHFFFAOYSA-N
PCDE-6	C_{12}H_{8}Cl_{2}O	2,3'-dichlorodiphenyl ether	7024-99-9	NWRJCFQSGUPLID-UHFFFAOYSA-N
PCDE-7	C_{12}H_{8}Cl_{2}O	2,4-dichlorodiphenyl ether	51892-26-3	KXIPYLZZJZMMPD-UHFFFAOYSA-N
PCDE-8	C_{12}H_{8}Cl_{2}O	2,4'-dichlorodiphenyl ether	6903-65-7	MWKULKMSBBSGTP-UHFFFAOYSA-N
PCDE-9	C_{12}H_{8}Cl_{2}O	2,5-dichlorodiphenyl ether	24910-69-8	VITXVDNQHXYQSK-UHFFFAOYSA-N
PCDE-10	C_{12}H_{8}Cl_{2}O	2,6-dichlorodiphenyl ether	28419-69-4	IRLZOQDGEAEIPX-UHFFFAOYSA-N
PCDE-11	C_{12}H_{8}Cl_{2}O	3,3'-dichlorodiphenyl ether	6903-62-4	RQMZSXZFMWCEET-UHFFFAOYSA-N
PCDE-12	C_{12}H_{8}Cl_{2}O	3,4-dichlorodiphenyl ether	55538-69-7	QFQLZVAAQOJUFS-UHFFFAOYSA-N
PCDE-13	C_{12}H_{8}Cl_{2}O	3,4'-dichlorodiphenyl ether	51289-10-2	HPRGYUWRGCTBAV-UHFFFAOYSA-N
PCDE-14	C_{12}H_{8}Cl_{2}O	3,5-dichlorodiphenyl ether	24910-68-7	LEKOWSSKXYFERR-UHFFFAOYSA-N
PCDE-15	C_{12}H_{8}Cl_{2}O	4,4'-dichlorodiphenyl ether	2444-89-5	URUJZHZLCCIILC-UHFFFAOYSA-N
PCDE-16	C_{12}H_{7}Cl_{3}O	2,2',3-trichlorodiphenyl ether	727738-38-7	XFQQAPMKSRDRNO-UHFFFAOYSA-N
PCDE-17	C_{12}H_{7}Cl_{3}O	2,2',4-trichlorodiphenyl ether	68914-97-6	YXMNUPKWUMIZAV-UHFFFAOYSA-N
PCDE-18	C_{12}H_{7}Cl_{3}O	2,2',5-trichlorodiphenyl ether	727738-42-3	NTJXMYMAAKIBAL-UHFFFAOYSA-N
PCDE-19	C_{12}H_{7}Cl_{3}O	2,2',6-trichlorodiphenyl ether	727738-44-5	CQVFBUDIKATBSM-UHFFFAOYSA-N
PCDE-20	C_{12}H_{7}Cl_{3}O	2,3,3'-trichlorodiphenyl ether	727738-39-8	WRBFXFUXFGLONT-UHFFFAOYSA-N
PCDE-21	C_{12}H_{7}Cl_{3}O	2,3,4-trichlorodiphenyl ether	85918-32-7	ANKBTLMYMVMWBS-UHFFFAOYSA-N
PCDE-22	C_{12}H_{7}Cl_{3}O	2,3,4'-trichlorodiphenyl ether	157683-71-1	KOTNFWJIMRGVBR-UHFFFAOYSA-N
PCDE-23	C_{12}H_{7}Cl_{3}O	2,3,5-trichlorodiphenyl ether	162853-24-9	MDSPKCWGOVVFJD-UHFFFAOYSA-N
PCDE-24	C_{12}H_{7}Cl_{3}O	2,3,6-trichlorodiphenyl ether	162853-25-0	RQSRPDGSUDRYLH-UHFFFAOYSA-N
PCDE-25	C_{12}H_{7}Cl_{3}O	2,3',4-trichlorodiphenyl ether	155999-93-2	BJFOCMRBCBZFJT-UHFFFAOYSA-N
PCDE-26	C_{12}H_{7}Cl_{3}O	2,3',5-trichlorodiphenyl ether	727738-43-4	FTGPHPONDJREBV-UHFFFAOYSA-N
PCDE-27	C_{12}H_{7}Cl_{3}O	2,3',6-trichlorodiphenyl ether	727738-45-6	CSKOAUQGNHMPBS-UHFFFAOYSA-N
PCDE-28	C_{12}H_{7}Cl_{3}O	2,4,4'-trichlorodiphenyl ether	59039-21-3	PIORTDHJOLELKR-UHFFFAOYSA-N
PCDE-29	C_{12}H_{7}Cl_{3}O	2,4,5-trichlorodiphenyl ether	52322-80-2	UWKZWXCTDPYXHU-UHFFFAOYSA-N
PCDE-30	C_{12}H_{7}Cl_{3}O	2,4,6-trichlorodiphenyl ether	63646-52-6	WXLQUFLKMICSSY-UHFFFAOYSA-N
PCDE-31	C_{12}H_{7}Cl_{3}O	2,4',5-trichlorodiphenyl ether	65075-00-5	FZBSTAVCYOMFMD-UHFFFAOYSA-N
PCDE-32	C_{12}H_{7}Cl_{3}O	2,4',6-trichlorodiphenyl ether	157683-72-2	ZMRFCSWFCKICQE-UHFFFAOYSA-N
PCDE-33	C_{12}H_{7}Cl_{3}O	2,3',4'-trichlorodiphenyl ether	61328-44-7	VBNJGYOQZAENPO-UHFFFAOYSA-N
PCDE-34	C_{12}H_{7}Cl_{3}O	2,3',5'-trichlorodiphenyl ether	727738-40-1	WNTKDANBGHJDLL-UHFFFAOYSA-N
PCDE-35	C_{12}H_{7}Cl_{3}O	3,3',4-trichlorodiphenyl ether	66794-60-3	BUKLLCIUMZELOH-UHFFFAOYSA-N
PCDE-36	C_{12}H_{7}Cl_{3}O	3,3',5-trichlorodiphenyl ether	727738-41-2	NIYPWVDRZJTBLM-UHFFFAOYSA-N
PCDE-37	C_{12}H_{7}Cl_{3}O	3,4,4'-trichlorodiphenyl ether	63646-51-5	FTZDEZOARSJHGU-UHFFFAOYSA-N
PCDE-38	C_{12}H_{7}Cl_{3}O	3,4,5-trichlorodiphenyl ether	63646-53-7	ZQCCHNBMSHOJAT-UHFFFAOYSA-N
PCDE-39	C_{12}H_{7}Cl_{3}O	3,4',5-trichlorodiphenyl ether	24910-73-4	CCEZFZGXWFJQEF-UHFFFAOYSA-N
PCDE-40	C_{12}H_{6}Cl_{4}O	2,2',3,3'-tetrachlorodiphenyl ether	727738-46-7	WXEOWWVZWWGBBQ-UHFFFAOYSA-N
PCDE-41	C_{12}H_{6}Cl_{4}O	2,2',3,4-tetrachlorodiphenyl ether	220002-37-9	VTTDWGUAWMLHPR-UHFFFAOYSA-N
PCDE-42	C_{12}H_{6}Cl_{4}O	2,2',3,4'-tetrachlorodiphenyl ether	147102-63-4	UYVBJPIPRAJEKW-UHFFFAOYSA-N
PCDE-43	C_{12}H_{6}Cl_{4}O	2,2',3,5-tetrachlorodiphenyl ether	727738-50-3	RTDOXTNDEIQMSD-UHFFFAOYSA-N
PCDE-44	C_{12}H_{6}Cl_{4}O	2,2',3,5'-tetrachlorodiphenyl ether	727738-47-8	WTZJRRWYCWWOOF-UHFFFAOYSA-N
PCDE-45	C_{12}H_{6}Cl_{4}O	2,2',3,6-tetrachlorodiphenyl ether	727738-52-5	FKCWLBPOXAHCEZ-UHFFFAOYSA-N
PCDE-46	C_{12}H_{6}Cl_{4}O	2,2',3,6'-tetrachlorodiphenyl ether	727738-48-9	KDCKWINSPKLQNE-UHFFFAOYSA-N
PCDE-47	C_{12}H_{6}Cl_{4}O	2,2',4,4'-tetrachlorodiphenyl ether	28076-73-5	ZRWRPGGXCSSBAO-UHFFFAOYSA-N
PCDE-48	C_{12}H_{6}Cl_{4}O	2,2',4,5-tetrachlorodiphenyl ether	162853-26-1	DRVAMLZVBNYSQE-UHFFFAOYSA-N
PCDE-49	C_{12}H_{6}Cl_{4}O	2,2',4,5'-tetrachlorodiphenyl ether	155999-92-1	XIXPEFLLHQAIOY-UHFFFAOYSA-N
PCDE-50	C_{12}H_{6}Cl_{4}O	2,2',4,6-tetrachlorodiphenyl ether	727738-54-7	KTWRMXMTWFBDRJ-UHFFFAOYSA-N
PCDE-51	C_{12}H_{6}Cl_{4}O	2,2',4,6'-tetrachlorodiphenyl ether	147102-65-6	DDQTXMCKLUKGCX-UHFFFAOYSA-N
PCDE-52	C_{12}H_{6}Cl_{4}O	2,2',5,5'-tetrachlorodiphenyl ether	727738-56-9	YWBKRNRSWKEARX-UHFFFAOYSA-N
PCDE-53	C_{12}H_{6}Cl_{4}O	2,2',5,6'-tetrachlorodiphenyl ether	727738-57-0	PTDYNPOYHAVZAN-UHFFFAOYSA-N
PCDE-54	C_{12}H_{6}Cl_{4}O	2,2',6,6'-tetrachlorodiphenyl ether	91371-42-5	QGEKQTVINSUSJJ-UHFFFAOYSA-N
PCDE-55	C_{12}H_{6}Cl_{4}O	2,3,3',4-tetrachlorodiphenyl ether	220002-39-1	IZISEKJPNSBPRX-UHFFFAOYSA-N
PCDE-56	C_{12}H_{6}Cl_{4}O	2,3,3',4'-tetrachlorodiphenyl ether	162853-27-2	JVFGXWCLGNACOG-UHFFFAOYSA-N
PCDE-57	C_{12}H_{6}Cl_{4}O	2,3,3',5-tetrachlorodiphenyl ether	727738-51-4	WDEDSACPPIUBIM-UHFFFAOYSA-N
PCDE-58	C_{12}H_{6}Cl_{4}O	2,3,3',5'-tetrachlorodiphenyl ether	727738-49-0	PSENAJOMGBHPFL-UHFFFAOYSA-N
PCDE-59	C_{12}H_{6}Cl_{4}O	2,3,3',6-tetrachlorodiphenyl ether	727738-53-6	XBAUODQBIVRIOY-UHFFFAOYSA-N
PCDE-60	C_{12}H_{6}Cl_{4}O	2,3,4,4'-tetrachlorodiphenyl ether	65075-01-6	ZPOBHUZRVVTGKB-UHFFFAOYSA-N
PCDE-61	C_{12}H_{6}Cl_{4}O	2,3,4,5-tetrachlorodiphenyl ether	220002-40-4	QAPPZLVGIXQUJW-UHFFFAOYSA-N
PCDE-62	C_{12}H_{6}Cl_{4}O	2,3,4,6-tetrachlorodiphenyl ether	85918-33-8	WJZPRRFFZWVZJL-UHFFFAOYSA-N
PCDE-63	C_{12}H_{6}Cl_{4}O	2,3,4',5-tetrachlorodiphenyl ether	220002-41-5	YHQRYZGDQCSHFO-UHFFFAOYSA-N
PCDE-64	C_{12}H_{6}Cl_{4}O	2,3,4',6-tetrachlorodiphenyl ether	220002-42-6	HJCNTJIMUWQMSA-UHFFFAOYSA-N
PCDE-65	C_{12}H_{6}Cl_{4}O	2,3,5,6-tetrachlorodiphenyl ether	63646-54-8	UFGXCDQXRUFDMA-UHFFFAOYSA-N
PCDE-66	C_{12}H_{6}Cl_{4}O	2,3',4,4'-tetrachlorodiphenyl ether	61328-46-9	CAWSVYYOUZEMHA-UHFFFAOYSA-N
PCDE-67	C_{12}H_{6}Cl_{4}O	2,3',4,5-tetrachlorodiphenyl ether	152833-52-8	QDQGECFQVPRMEO-UHFFFAOYSA-N
PCDE-68	C_{12}H_{6}Cl_{4}O	2,3',4,5'-tetrachlorodiphenyl ether	147102-64-5	XORVNHCKWFPDLN-UHFFFAOYSA-N
PCDE-69	C_{12}H_{6}Cl_{4}O	2,3',4,6-tetrachlorodiphenyl ether	727738-55-8	AVSRXQFGVHEINV-UHFFFAOYSA-N
PCDE-70	C_{12}H_{6}Cl_{4}O	2,3',4',5-tetrachlorodiphenyl ether	159553-67-0	MFTPXFIGIJCNJM-UHFFFAOYSA-N
PCDE-71	C_{12}H_{6}Cl_{4}O	2,3',4',6-tetrachlorodiphenyl ether	130892-66-9	IZZULMOBRTYHMH-UHFFFAOYSA-N
PCDE-72	C_{12}H_{6}Cl_{4}O	2,3',5,5'-tetrachlorodiphenyl ether	727738-58-1	AHMHHSWRNYLGBD-UHFFFAOYSA-N
PCDE-73	C_{12}H_{6}Cl_{4}O	2,3',5',6-tetrachlorodiphenyl ether	727738-59-2	GMYOHLGVVRWHJK-UHFFFAOYSA-N
PCDE-74	C_{12}H_{6}Cl_{4}O	2,4,4',5-tetrachlorodiphenyl ether	61328-45-8	KXOJXWNARBQHNX-UHFFFAOYSA-N
PCDE-75	C_{12}H_{6}Cl_{4}O	2,4,4',6-tetrachlorodiphenyl ether	63553-30-0	YCWRSOTXXJYCKF-UHFFFAOYSA-N
PCDE-76	C_{12}H_{6}Cl_{4}O	2,3',4',5'-tetrachlorodiphenyl ether	727738-60-5	DLMAJSUWVRZPHT-UHFFFAOYSA-N
PCDE-77	C_{12}H_{6}Cl_{4}O	3,3',4,4'-tetrachlorodiphenyl ether	56348-72-2	DHLVZXZRIZBPKG-UHFFFAOYSA-N
PCDE-78	C_{12}H_{6}Cl_{4}O	3,3',4,5-tetrachlorodiphenyl ether	727738-61-6	WOLCBXVZYPVADU-UHFFFAOYSA-N
PCDE-79	C_{12}H_{6}Cl_{4}O	3,3',4,5'-tetrachlorodiphenyl ether	552884-22-7	BUPRSRBWDJVKGG-UHFFFAOYSA-N
PCDE-80	C_{12}H_{6}Cl_{4}O	3,3',5,5'-tetrachlorodiphenyl ether	85918-34-9	MOQYEWLNKZQUBJ-UHFFFAOYSA-N
PCDE-81	C_{12}H_{6}Cl_{4}O	3,4,4',5-tetrachlorodiphenyl ether	62615-07-0	CAUBBRCOHHHCNG-UHFFFAOYSA-N
PCDE-82	C_{12}H_{5}Cl_{5}O	2,2',3,3',4-pentachlorodiphenyl ether	160282-10-0	ABRDPORILGADAP-UHFFFAOYSA-N
PCDE-83	C_{12}H_{5}Cl_{5}O	2,2',3,3',5-pentachlorodiphenyl ether	727738-65-0	PFQONVKWGPWBIJ-UHFFFAOYSA-N
PCDE-84	C_{12}H_{5}Cl_{5}O	2,2',3,3',6-pentachlorodiphenyl ether	727738-71-8	PGFVVFUTVNUGGF-UHFFFAOYSA-N
PCDE-85	C_{12}H_{5}Cl_{5}O	2,2',3,4,4'-pentachlorodiphenyl ether	71585-37-0	RSBUDFTVQYJNHK-UHFFFAOYSA-N
PCDE-86	C_{12}H_{5}Cl_{5}O	2,2',3,4,5-pentachlorodiphenyl ether	727738-62-7	WKCMCEFIDNESSP-UHFFFAOYSA-N
PCDE-87	C_{12}H_{5}Cl_{5}O	2,2',3,4,5'-pentachlorodiphenyl ether	160282-09-7	SCLCXTQIVCULDR-UHFFFAOYSA-N
PCDE-88	C_{12}H_{5}Cl_{5}O	2,2',3,4,6-pentachlorodiphenyl ether	182346-19-6	VMHYACXCJLMWFU-UHFFFAOYSA-N
PCDE-89	C_{12}H_{5}Cl_{5}O	2,2',3,4,6'-pentachlorodiphenyl ether	85918-35-0	JGXAONSRHOSPTJ-UHFFFAOYSA-N
PCDE-90	C_{12}H_{5}Cl_{5}O	2,2',3,4',5-pentachlorodiphenyl ether	157683-73-3	QPEBRZQSEUOWPA-UHFFFAOYSA-N
PCDE-91	C_{12}H_{5}Cl_{5}O	2,2',3,4',6-pentachlorodiphenyl ether	116995-20-1	BRNKJDZWZYZVNM-UHFFFAOYSA-N
PCDE-92	C_{12}H_{5}Cl_{5}O	2,2',3,5,5'-pentachlorodiphenyl ether	727738-66-1	HFNDNQXOPGBGAM-UHFFFAOYSA-N
PCDE-93	C_{12}H_{5}Cl_{5}O	2,2',3,5,6-pentachlorodiphenyl ether	727738-69-4	MGQCBCDXLWFWEN-UHFFFAOYSA-N
PCDE-94	C_{12}H_{5}Cl_{5}O	2,2',3,5,6'-pentachlorodiphenyl ether	727738-67-2	JOWOWBQKVYRISB-UHFFFAOYSA-N
PCDE-95	C_{12}H_{5}Cl_{5}O	2,2',3,5',6-pentachlorodiphenyl ether	727738-72-9	WLRLUWBUJXOZNG-UHFFFAOYSA-N
PCDE-96	C_{12}H_{5}Cl_{5}O	2,2',3,6,6'-pentachlorodiphenyl ether	727738-73-0	YSQZLJVFAAGJPM-UHFFFAOYSA-N
PCDE-97	C_{12}H_{5}Cl_{5}O	2,2',3,4',5'-pentachlorodiphenyl ether	160282-08-6	ABYZYVAIOYICJQ-UHFFFAOYSA-N
PCDE-98	C_{12}H_{5}Cl_{5}O	2,2',3,4',6'-pentachlorodiphenyl ether	727738-75-2	CMSKHCOLRHTFBZ-UHFFFAOYSA-N
PCDE-99	C_{12}H_{5}Cl_{5}O	2,2',4,4',5-pentachlorodiphenyl ether	60123-64-0	AVURWLKSFZBANQ-UHFFFAOYSA-N
PCDE-100	C_{12}H_{5}Cl_{5}O	2,2',4,4',6-pentachlorodiphenyl ether	104294-16-8	FONWDRSQXQZNBN-UHFFFAOYSA-N
PCDE-101	C_{12}H_{5}Cl_{5}O	2,2',4,5,5'-pentachlorodiphenyl ether	131138-21-1	MKIAKZAWONVRFF-UHFFFAOYSA-N
PCDE-102	C_{12}H_{5}Cl_{5}O	2,2',4,5,6'-pentachlorodiphenyl ether	130892-67-0	BOJBTUWEQMUWHT-UHFFFAOYSA-N
PCDE-103	C_{12}H_{5}Cl_{5}O	2,2',4,5',6-pentachlorodiphenyl ether	727738-76-3	XNEDCRGDWSPQTR-UHFFFAOYSA-N
PCDE-104	C_{12}H_{5}Cl_{5}O	2,2',4,6,6'-pentachlorodiphenyl ether	727738-77-4	BTEUFGHCTDYVPC-UHFFFAOYSA-N
PCDE-105	C_{12}H_{5}Cl_{5}O	2,3,3',4,4'-pentachlorodiphenyl ether	85918-31-6	PKEGIXYNAGGYPN-UHFFFAOYSA-N
PCDE-106	C_{12}H_{5}Cl_{5}O	2,3,3',4,5-pentachlorodiphenyl ether	727738-63-8	DLDSGDIHZMLFNO-UHFFFAOYSA-N
PCDE-107	C_{12}H_{5}Cl_{5}O	2,3,3',4',5-pentachlorodiphenyl ether	159553-68-1	ZVFHTYGIYIXYOJ-UHFFFAOYSA-N
PCDE-108	C_{12}H_{5}Cl_{5}O	2,3,3',4,5'-pentachlorodiphenyl ether	160282-07-5	HCTKORQPUZCIAO-UHFFFAOYSA-N
PCDE-109	C_{12}H_{5}Cl_{5}O	2,3,3',4,6-pentachlorodiphenyl ether	727738-64-9	SEIXDCGLHKOBEO-UHFFFAOYSA-N
PCDE-110	C_{12}H_{5}Cl_{5}O	2,3,3',4',6-pentachlorodiphenyl ether	159553-69-2	KASGFDPQAMDPAZ-UHFFFAOYSA-N
PCDE-111	C_{12}H_{5}Cl_{5}O	2,3,3',5,5'-pentachlorodiphenyl ether	727738-68-3	YJVQHOLZYOYYTR-UHFFFAOYSA-N
PCDE-112	C_{12}H_{5}Cl_{5}O	2,3,3',5,6-pentachlorodiphenyl ether	727738-70-7	NDUYWFKVCDCFGA-UHFFFAOYSA-N
PCDE-113	C_{12}H_{5}Cl_{5}O	2,3,3',5',6-pentachlorodiphenyl ether	727738-74-1	XNJNBZDXPSVWSJ-UHFFFAOYSA-N
PCDE-114	C_{12}H_{5}Cl_{5}O	2,3,4,4',5-pentachlorodiphenyl ether	113464-17-8	WSTVMACYLXUQIM-UHFFFAOYSA-N
PCDE-115	C_{12}H_{5}Cl_{5}O	2,3,4,4',6-pentachlorodiphenyl ether	160282-05-3	LUNNFBBTEHRYMW-UHFFFAOYSA-N
PCDE-116	C_{12}H_{5}Cl_{5}O	2,3,4,5,6-pentachlorodiphenyl ether	22274-42-6	JDWOFUWJURZFFF-UHFFFAOYSA-N
PCDE-117	C_{12}H_{5}Cl_{5}O	2,3,4',5,6-pentachlorodiphenyl ether	63646-55-9	UETIKWAWMZLQQZ-UHFFFAOYSA-N
PCDE-118	C_{12}H_{5}Cl_{5}O	2,3',4,4',5-pentachlorodiphenyl ether	60123-65-1	NRAVUGAGYOBXIG-UHFFFAOYSA-N
PCDE-119	C_{12}H_{5}Cl_{5}O	2,3',4,4',6-pentachlorodiphenyl ether	157683-74-4	POOXVKSDWCXIBU-UHFFFAOYSA-N
PCDE-120	C_{12}H_{5}Cl_{5}O	2,3',4,5,5'-pentachlorodiphenyl ether	160282-04-2	XIFRTJZLSYOLIU-UHFFFAOYSA-N
PCDE-121	C_{12}H_{5}Cl_{5}O	2,3',4,5',6-pentachlorodiphenyl ether	76621-13-1	QZWNZTBNKKZIBR-UHFFFAOYSA-N
PCDE-122	C_{12}H_{5}Cl_{5}O	2,3,3',4',5'-pentachlorodiphenyl ether	727738-78-5	WXFDCSJOOWTDKN-UHFFFAOYSA-N
PCDE-123	C_{12}H_{5}Cl_{5}O	2,3',4,4',5'-pentachlorodiphenyl ether	160282-06-4	BUAXMSGDEZZOJD-UHFFFAOYSA-N
PCDE-124	C_{12}H_{5}Cl_{5}O	2,3',4',5,5'-pentachlorodiphenyl ether	727738-79-6	KUGBGRTUMUNYBS-UHFFFAOYSA-N
PCDE-125	C_{12}H_{5}Cl_{5}O	2,3',4',5',6-pentachlorodiphenyl ether	727738-80-9	NHSFXYSHJBBWMZ-UHFFFAOYSA-N
PCDE-126	C_{12}H_{5}Cl_{5}O	3,3',4,4',5-pentachlorodiphenyl ether	94339-59-0	WDBLKMRZRGLISL-UHFFFAOYSA-N
PCDE-127	C_{12}H_{5}Cl_{5}O	3,3',4,5,5'-pentachlorodiphenyl ether	220002-43-7	UNFZSLPZWOFSAL-UHFFFAOYSA-N
PCDE-128	C_{12}H_{4}Cl_{6}O	2,2',3,3',4,4'-hexachlorodiphenyl ether	71585-39-2	GSWMXIIUDJOXNF-UHFFFAOYSA-N
PCDE-129	C_{12}H_{4}Cl_{6}O	2,2',3,3',4,5-hexachlorodiphenyl ether	159553-70-5	NLXTWOFWKUBHQN-UHFFFAOYSA-N
PCDE-130	C_{12}H_{4}Cl_{6}O	2,2',3,3',4,5'-hexachlorodiphenyl ether	76621-14-2	JTEWACHFMNTRBB-UHFFFAOYSA-N
PCDE-131	C_{12}H_{4}Cl_{6}O	2,2',3,3',4,6-hexachlorodiphenyl ether	727738-84-3	IUAAWWDTUKIICO-UHFFFAOYSA-N
PCDE-132	C_{12}H_{4}Cl_{6}O	2,2',3,3',4,6'-hexachlorodiphenyl ether	124076-66-0	YDVYLSIVXYLBBX-UHFFFAOYSA-N
PCDE-133	C_{12}H_{4}Cl_{6}O	2,2',3,3',5,5'-hexachlorodiphenyl ether	727738-87-6	RJDQOTCZUUQNPX-UHFFFAOYSA-N
PCDE-134	C_{12}H_{4}Cl_{6}O	2,2',3,3',5,6-hexachlorodiphenyl ether	727738-90-1	ZVPXTJYWPPQWHQ-UHFFFAOYSA-N
PCDE-135	C_{12}H_{4}Cl_{6}O	2,2',3,3',5,6'-hexachlorodiphenyl ether	727738-88-7	HDUBDRLESJYOFX-UHFFFAOYSA-N
PCDE-136	C_{12}H_{4}Cl_{6}O	2,2',3,3',6,6'-hexachlorodiphenyl ether	117948-40-0	UESXDYAQZBZDKY-UHFFFAOYSA-N
PCDE-137	C_{12}H_{4}Cl_{6}O	2,2',3,4,4',5-hexachlorodiphenyl ether	71585-38-1	LDPJEMNNPDFBCQ-UHFFFAOYSA-N
PCDE-138	C_{12}H_{4}Cl_{6}O	2,2',3,4,4',5'-hexachlorodiphenyl ether	71585-36-9	PHSJJYZIFPWCLZ-UHFFFAOYSA-N
PCDE-139	C_{12}H_{4}Cl_{6}O	2,2',3,4,4',6-hexachlorodiphenyl ether	106220-83-1	BIWCEXHDIQZFHI-UHFFFAOYSA-N
PCDE-140	C_{12}H_{4}Cl_{6}O	2,2',3,4,4',6'-hexachlorodiphenyl ether	106220-82-0	XDAOZRZWYVKIAK-UHFFFAOYSA-N
PCDE-141	C_{12}H_{4}Cl_{6}O	2,2',3,4,5,5'-hexachlorodiphenyl ether	727738-81-0	CFPVKPARHZZFTP-UHFFFAOYSA-N
PCDE-142	C_{12}H_{4}Cl_{6}O	2,2',3,4,5,6-hexachlorodiphenyl ether	727738-82-1	OULAUCWOZGSVPO-UHFFFAOYSA-N
PCDE-143	C_{12}H_{4}Cl_{6}O	2,2',3,4,5,6'-hexachlorodiphenyl ether	159553-71-6	YEXFSSRNNAZOCL-UHFFFAOYSA-N
PCDE-144	C_{12}H_{4}Cl_{6}O	2,2',3,4,5',6-hexachlorodiphenyl ether	727738-85-4	GUWQFNUOPQKNMH-UHFFFAOYSA-N
PCDE-145	C_{12}H_{4}Cl_{6}O	2,2',3,4,6,6'-hexachlorodiphenyl ether	165282-28-0	YPWSQLYCZDWFFL-UHFFFAOYSA-N
PCDE-146	C_{12}H_{4}Cl_{6}O	2,2',3,4',5,5'-hexachlorodiphenyl ether	162853-28-3	SFTBUGPDOJDENF-UHFFFAOYSA-N
PCDE-147	C_{12}H_{4}Cl_{6}O	2,2',3,4',5,6-hexachlorodiphenyl ether	116995-18-7	DIBYIHMYEPMGKC-UHFFFAOYSA-N
PCDE-148	C_{12}H_{4}Cl_{6}O	2,2',3,4',5,6'-hexachlorodiphenyl ether	727738-89-8	LYODMXFYEXLACS-UHFFFAOYSA-N
PCDE-149	C_{12}H_{4}Cl_{6}O	2,2',3,4',5',6-hexachlorodiphenyl ether	85918-37-2	RDKSFIZNZGWNLA-UHFFFAOYSA-N
PCDE-150	C_{12}H_{4}Cl_{6}O	2,2',3,4',6,6'-hexachlorodiphenyl ether	116995-19-8	PTJHUCWECJWOEQ-UHFFFAOYSA-N
PCDE-151	C_{12}H_{4}Cl_{6}O	2,2',3,5,5',6-hexachlorodiphenyl ether	727738-91-2	YZRAPDULDMXSPA-UHFFFAOYSA-N
PCDE-152	C_{12}H_{4}Cl_{6}O	2,2',3,5,6,6'-hexachlorodiphenyl ether	727738-92-3	RYUWTVSUXULBMG-UHFFFAOYSA-N
PCDE-153	C_{12}H_{4}Cl_{6}O	2,2',4,4',5,5'-hexachlorodiphenyl ether	71859-30-8	PECXRRMHOQBOIE-UHFFFAOYSA-N
PCDE-154	C_{12}H_{4}Cl_{6}O	2,2',4,4',5,6'-hexachlorodiphenyl ether	106220-81-9	XKQUAQGQLZDDBV-UHFFFAOYSA-N
PCDE-155	C_{12}H_{4}Cl_{6}O	2,2',4,4',6,6'-hexachlorodiphenyl ether	6973-37-1	UPFQVVDUHJVSON-UHFFFAOYSA-N
PCDE-156	C_{12}H_{4}Cl_{6}O	2,3,3',4,4',5-hexachlorodiphenyl ether	109828-22-0	GHTWMHLFFDEYRE-UHFFFAOYSA-N
PCDE-157	C_{12}H_{4}Cl_{6}O	2,3,3',4,4',5'-hexachlorodiphenyl ether	94339-60-3	FEIDIWDEJQVIPO-UHFFFAOYSA-N
PCDE-158	C_{12}H_{4}Cl_{6}O	2,3,3',4,4',6-hexachlorodiphenyl ether	85918-36-1	NRCNIBYWQMNZON-UHFFFAOYSA-N
PCDE-159	C_{12}H_{4}Cl_{6}O	2,3,3',4,5,5'-hexachlorodiphenyl ether	159553-72-7	CIJJWEVJIHTJNE-UHFFFAOYSA-N
PCDE-160	C_{12}H_{4}Cl_{6}O	2,3,3',4,5,6-hexachlorodiphenyl ether	727738-83-2	ZBIQOLLVDDCFFA-UHFFFAOYSA-N
PCDE-161	C_{12}H_{4}Cl_{6}O	2,3,3',4,5',6-hexachlorodiphenyl ether	727738-86-5	JPLMACIRTLXPOQ-UHFFFAOYSA-N
PCDE-162	C_{12}H_{4}Cl_{6}O	2,3,3',4',5,5'-hexachlorodiphenyl ether	89026-26-6	FBVVCNLKVIABHV-UHFFFAOYSA-N
PCDE-163	C_{12}H_{4}Cl_{6}O	2,3,3',4',5,6-hexachlorodiphenyl ether	155999-97-6	YLAYOOJLJKJGCF-UHFFFAOYSA-N
PCDE-164	C_{12}H_{4}Cl_{6}O	2,3,3',4',5',6-hexachlorodiphenyl ether	727738-93-4	WYUYGMOEDXDGQA-UHFFFAOYSA-N
PCDE-165	C_{12}H_{4}Cl_{6}O	2,3,3',5,5',6-hexachlorodiphenyl ether	130480-89-6	WGESSRWJTGVWDL-UHFFFAOYSA-N
PCDE-166	C_{12}H_{4}Cl_{6}O	2,3,4,4',5,6-hexachlorodiphenyl ether	63646-56-0	MXDRLBNLTLOWGV-UHFFFAOYSA-N
PCDE-167	C_{12}H_{4}Cl_{6}O	2,3',4,4',5,5'-hexachlorodiphenyl ether	131138-20-0	DYSUSQZPGJXVAL-UHFFFAOYSA-N
PCDE-168	C_{12}H_{4}Cl_{6}O	2,3',4,4',5',6-hexachlorodiphenyl ether	727738-94-5	SJIBNBXSYVZESK-UHFFFAOYSA-N
PCDE-169	C_{12}H_{4}Cl_{6}O	3,3',4,4',5,5'-hexachlorodiphenyl ether	727738-95-6	GYICBGVARZIPNT-UHFFFAOYSA-N
PCDE-170	C_{12}H_{3}Cl_{7}O	2,2',3,3',4,4',5-heptachlorodiphenyl ether	71585-40-5	BLBURLWSCHSPIS-UHFFFAOYSA-N
PCDE-171	C_{12}H_{3}Cl_{7}O	2,2',3,3',4,4',6-heptachlorodiphenyl ether	727738-99-0	KKVXTOYNZOPDNA-UHFFFAOYSA-N
PCDE-172	C_{12}H_{3}Cl_{7}O	2,2',3,3',4,5,5'-heptachlorodiphenyl ether	83992-74-9	STEQFHAOHOCXAP-UHFFFAOYSA-N
PCDE-173	C_{12}H_{3}Cl_{7}O	2,2',3,3',4,5,6-heptachlorodiphenyl ether	727738-96-7	UIBVUVMDJNWEGY-UHFFFAOYSA-N
PCDE-174	C_{12}H_{3}Cl_{7}O	2,2',3,3',4,5,6'-heptachlorodiphenyl ether	159553-73-8	DQYYZAABYZAOOC-UHFFFAOYSA-N
PCDE-175	C_{12}H_{3}Cl_{7}O	2,2',3,3',4,5',6-heptachlorodiphenyl ether	727739-00-6	POOJWIFLMKEATK-UHFFFAOYSA-N
PCDE-176	C_{12}H_{3}Cl_{7}O	2,2',3,3',4,6,6'-heptachlorodiphenyl ether	727739-01-7	HSXGZTDEKOCJLP-UHFFFAOYSA-N
PCDE-177	C_{12}H_{3}Cl_{7}O	2,2',3,3',4,5',6'-heptachlorodiphenyl ether	83992-71-6	RXPQVFMDOJTCKE-UHFFFAOYSA-N
PCDE-178	C_{12}H_{3}Cl_{7}O	2,2',3,3',5,5',6-heptachlorodiphenyl ether	727739-03-9	WURJHLJFXPVIEL-UHFFFAOYSA-N
PCDE-179	C_{12}H_{3}Cl_{7}O	2,2',3,3',5,6,6'-heptachlorodiphenyl ether	727739-04-0	BLTBVEJZWOYWDS-UHFFFAOYSA-N
PCDE-180	C_{12}H_{3}Cl_{7}O	2,2',3,4,4',5,5'-heptachlorodiphenyl ether	83992-69-2	YBYYCWMPXZRBNJ-UHFFFAOYSA-N
PCDE-181	C_{12}H_{3}Cl_{7}O	2,2',3,4,4',5,6-heptachlorodiphenyl ether	157683-75-5	RPNFRXWGMTYOPA-UHFFFAOYSA-N
PCDE-182	C_{12}H_{3}Cl_{7}O	2,2',3,4,4',5,6'-heptachlorodiphenyl ether	88467-63-4	XWRZWPPSQDHTFU-UHFFFAOYSA-N
PCDE-183	C_{12}H_{3}Cl_{7}O	2,2',3,4,4',5',6-heptachlorodiphenyl ether	106220-85-3	WBKRPARQLGRVHF-UHFFFAOYSA-N
PCDE-184	C_{12}H_{3}Cl_{7}O	2,2',3,4,4',6,6'-heptachlorodiphenyl ether	106220-84-2	WTYSJAGEYAAIFW-UHFFFAOYSA-N
PCDE-185	C_{12}H_{3}Cl_{7}O	2,2',3,4,5,5',6-heptachlorodiphenyl ether	727738-97-8	CFYZMYMEFYKOFG-UHFFFAOYSA-N
PCDE-186	C_{12}H_{3}Cl_{7}O	2,2',3,4,5,6,6'-heptachlorodiphenyl ether	22274-48-2	WQIBKUPSASYXTE-UHFFFAOYSA-N
PCDE-187	C_{12}H_{3}Cl_{7}O	2,2',3,4',5,5',6-heptachlorodiphenyl ether	109828-23-1	BHJCMMGUFRZLKK-UHFFFAOYSA-N
PCDE-188	C_{12}H_{3}Cl_{7}O	2,2',3,4',5,6,6'-heptachlorodiphenyl ether	116995-22-3	HSLDIWDVXQRGEW-UHFFFAOYSA-N
PCDE-189	C_{12}H_{3}Cl_{7}O	2,3,3',4,4',5,5'-heptachlorodiphenyl ether	83992-72-7	JUHPMUOWCYBMEY-UHFFFAOYSA-N
PCDE-190	C_{12}H_{3}Cl_{7}O	2,3,3',4,4',5,6-heptachlorodiphenyl ether	83992-70-5	QLSBRXLSQINWHM-UHFFFAOYSA-N
PCDE-191	C_{12}H_{3}Cl_{7}O	2,3,3',4,4',5',6-heptachlorodiphenyl ether	727739-02-8	YUBXSCDZYOJXNX-UHFFFAOYSA-N
PCDE-192	C_{12}H_{3}Cl_{7}O	2,3,3',4,5,5',6-heptachlorodiphenyl ether	727738-98-9	HQXOKVVYOHXWEY-UHFFFAOYSA-N
PCDE-193	C_{12}H_{3}Cl_{7}O	2,3,3',4',5,5',6-heptachlorodiphenyl ether	727739-05-1	VCSBVBKQKLHPOG-UHFFFAOYSA-N
PCDE-194	C_{12}H_{2}Cl_{8}O	2,2',3,3',4,4',5,5'-octachlorodiphenyl ether	57379-40-5	IXZVOZCULZBCDY-UHFFFAOYSA-N
PCDE-195	C_{12}H_{2}Cl_{8}O	2,2',3,3',4,4',5,6-octachlorodiphenyl ether	65075-02-7	YHUPMPHVHYBYJE-UHFFFAOYSA-N
PCDE-196	C_{12}H_{2}Cl_{8}O	2,2',3,3',4,4',5,6'-octachlorodiphenyl ether	85918-38-3	HYNYIQBCBHJTOZ-UHFFFAOYSA-N
PCDE-197	C_{12}H_{2}Cl_{8}O	2,2',3,3',4,4',6,6'-octachlorodiphenyl ether	117948-62-6	GRWRDFGBFYSOKR-UHFFFAOYSA-N
PCDE-198	C_{12}H_{2}Cl_{8}O	2,2',3,3',4,5,5',6-octachlorodiphenyl ether	152833-53-9	PJSUXNJBOJXQBR-UHFFFAOYSA-N
PCDE-199	C_{12}H_{2}Cl_{8}O	2,2',3,3',4,5,5',6'-octachlorodiphenyl ether	83992-76-1	MRHQOXCYYPFGEE-UHFFFAOYSA-N
PCDE-200	C_{12}H_{2}Cl_{8}O	2,2',3,3',4,5,6,6'-octachlorodiphenyl ether	727739-06-2	ZTIKPIULDQZYBS-UHFFFAOYSA-N
PCDE-201	C_{12}H_{2}Cl_{8}O	2,2',3,3',4,5',6,6'-octachlorodiphenyl ether	116995-21-2	MHJYPBPVZSIJNU-UHFFFAOYSA-N
PCDE-202	C_{12}H_{2}Cl_{8}O	2,2',3,3',5,5',6,6'-octachlorodiphenyl ether	727739-08-4	DIMZRRNMPDXLMZ-UHFFFAOYSA-N
PCDE-203	C_{12}H_{2}Cl_{8}O	2,2',3,4,4',5,5',6-octachlorodiphenyl ether	83992-75-0	PKOSPVZTRLMBSK-UHFFFAOYSA-N
PCDE-204	C_{12}H_{2}Cl_{8}O	2,2',3,4,4',5,6,6'-octachlorodiphenyl ether	157683-76-6	FOTAEIZNNOYBMU-UHFFFAOYSA-N
PCDE-205	C_{12}H_{2}Cl_{8}O	2,3,3',4,4',5,5',6-octachlorodiphenyl ether	727739-07-3	VGJWAHFNNDDRKP-UHFFFAOYSA-N
PCDE-206	C_{12}HCl_{9}O	2,2',3,3',4,4',5,5',6-nonachlorodiphenyl ether	83992-73-8	FPEYJPVHPGDXDD-UHFFFAOYSA-N
PCDE-207	C_{12}HCl_{9}O	2,2',3,3',4,4',5,6,6'-nonachlorodiphenyl ether	148934-69-4	HEGNYKCNUVBAIL-UHFFFAOYSA-N
PCDE-208	C_{12}HCl_{9}O	2,2',3,3',4,5,5',6,6'-nonachlorodiphenyl ether	148934-68-3	MVPXEXAITKQEMV-UHFFFAOYSA-N
PCDE-209	C_{12}Cl_{10}O	decachlorodiphenyl ether	31710-30-2	CIPFDHFTBYJKQB-UHFFFAOYSA-N

== See also ==
- Polybrominated diphenyl ethers
