= 3,4-Dichlorophenyl isocyanate =

Names
- Preferred IUPAC name 1,2-Dichloro-4-isocyanatobenzene
- Other names Isocyanic acid, 3,4-dichlorophenyl ester

Identifiers
| CAS Number | 102-36-3 |
| 3D model (JSmol) | Interactive image |
| ChemSpider | 7325 |
| ECHA InfoCard | 100.002.752 |
| PubChem CID | 7607 |
| UNII | OZW0B7F1DU |
| CompTox Dashboard (EPA) | DTXSID9033008 |
- InChI: InChI=1S/C7H3Cl2NO/c8-6-2-1-5(10-4-11)3-7(6)9/h1-3H Key: MFUVCHZWGSJKEQ-UHFFFAOYSA-N; InChI=1/C7H3Cl2NO/c8-6-2-1-5(10-4-11)3-7(6)9/h1-3H Key: MFUVCHZWGSJKEQ-UHFFFAOYAC
- SMILES: Clc1ccc(/N=C=O)cc1Cl

Properties
| Chemical formula | C_{7}H_{3}Cl_{2}NO |
| Molar mass | 188.01 g·mol^{−1} |
- Except where otherwise noted, data are given for materials in their standard state (at 25 °C [77 °F], 100 kPa). Infobox references

3,4-Dichlorophenyl isocyanate is a chemical compound used as a chemical intermediate and in organic synthesis. It is a solid, and ranges in colour from white to yellow. It is an irritant for tissues including eyes and mucous membranes, and inhalation of dust from the chemical is poisonous. It can be used industrially in the preparation of triclocarban by reaction with p-chloroaniline.

It is classified as an extremely hazardous substance in the United States as defined in Section 302 of the U.S. Emergency Planning and Community Right-to-Know Act (42 U.S.C. 11002), and is subject to strict reporting requirements by facilities which produce, store, or use it in significant quantities.
