= Hand sanitizer =

Supplement to hand washing

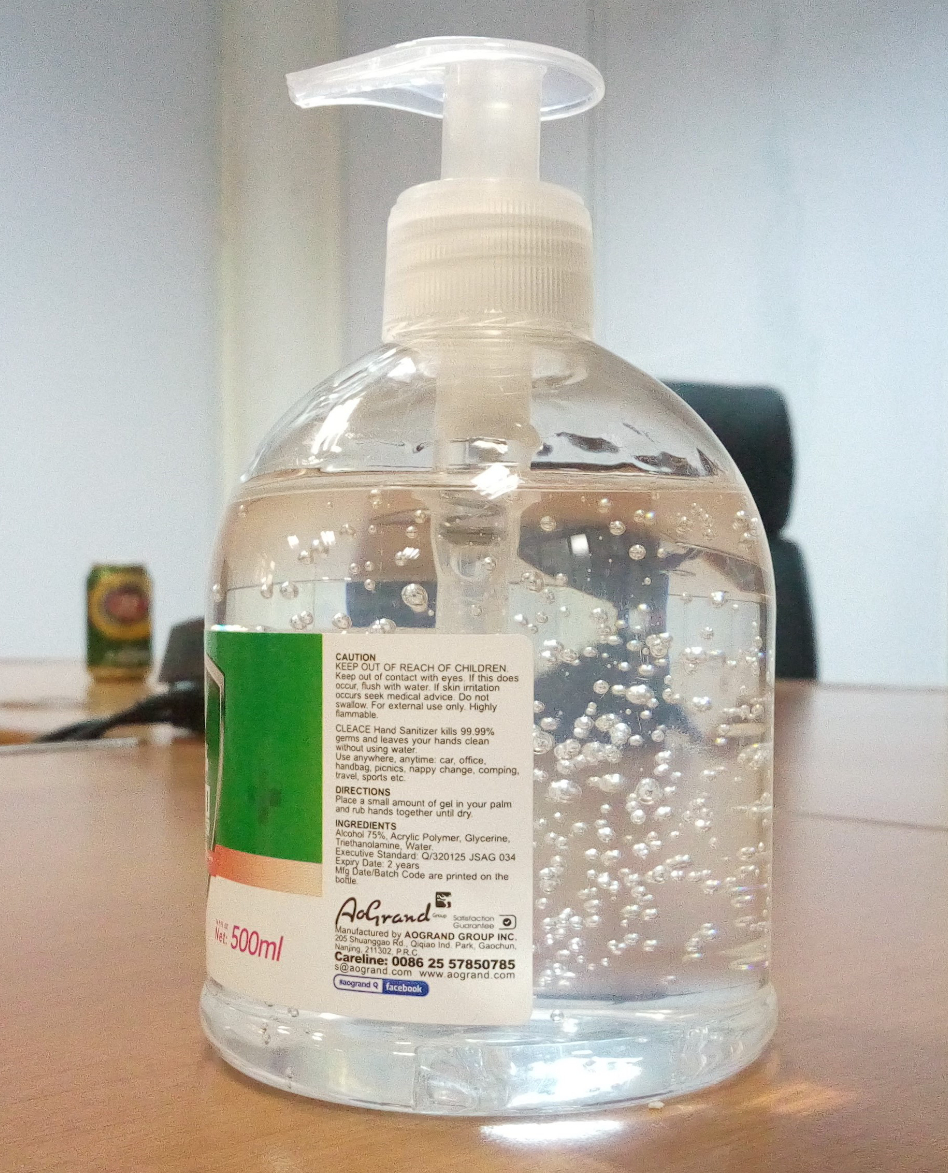
- A typical pump bottle dispenser of hand sanitizer gel

Clinical data
- Other names: Hand sanitizer, hand antiseptic, hand disinfectant, hand rub, handrub

Hand sanitizer (also known as hand antiseptic, hand disinfectant, hand rub, or handrub) is a liquid, gel, or foam used to kill viruses, bacteria, and other microorganisms on the hands. It can also come in the form of a cream, spray, or wipe. While hand washing with soap and water is generally preferred, hand sanitizer is a convenient alternative in settings where soap and water are unavailable. However, it is less effective against certain pathogens like norovirus and Clostridioides difficile and cannot physically remove harmful chemicals. Improper use, such as wiping off sanitizer before it dries, can also reduce its effectiveness, and some sanitizers with low alcohol concentrations are less effective. Additionally, frequent use of hand sanitizer may disrupt the skin's microbiome and cause dermatitis.

Alcohol-based hand sanitizers, which contain at least 60% alcohol (ethanol or isopropyl alcohol), are recommended by the United States Centers for Disease Control and Prevention (CDC) when soap and water are not available. In healthcare settings, these sanitizers are often preferred over hand washing with soap and water because they are more effective at reducing bacteria and are better tolerated by the skin. However, hand washing should still be performed if contamination is visible or after using the toilet. Non-alcohol-based hand sanitizers, which may contain benzalkonium chloride or triclosan, are less effective and generally not recommended, though they are not flammable.

The formulation of alcohol-based hand sanitizers typically includes a combination of isopropyl alcohol, ethanol, or n-propanol, with alcohol concentrations ranging from 60% to 95% being the most effective. These sanitizers are flammable and work against a wide variety of microorganisms, but not spores. To prevent skin dryness, compounds such as glycerol may be added, and some formulations include fragrances, though these are discouraged due to the risk of allergic reactions. Non-alcohol-based versions are less effective and should be used with caution.

The use of alcohol as an antiseptic dates back to at least 1363, with evidence supporting its use emerging in the late 1800s. Alcohol-based hand sanitizers became commonly used in Europe by the 1980s and have since been included on the World Health Organization's List of Essential Medicines.

== Uses ==
=== General public ===
Alcohol-based hand sanitizers may not be effective if the hands are slimy, greasy or visibly soiled. In hospitals, the hands of healthcare workers are often contaminated with pathogens, but rarely soiled or greasy.

Some commercially available hand sanitizers (and online recipes for homemade rubs) have alcohol concentrations that are too low. This makes them less effective at killing germs. Poorer people in developed countries and people in developing countries may find it harder to get a hand sanitizer with an effective alcohol concentration. Fraudulent labelling of alcohol concentrations has been a problem in Guyana.

=== Schools ===
The current evidence that the effectiveness of school hand hygiene interventions is of poor quality.

In a 2020 Cochrane review comparing rinse-free hand washing to conventional soap and water techniques and the subsequent impact on school absenteeism found a small but beneficial effect on rinse-free hand washing on illness related absenteeism.

=== Health care ===
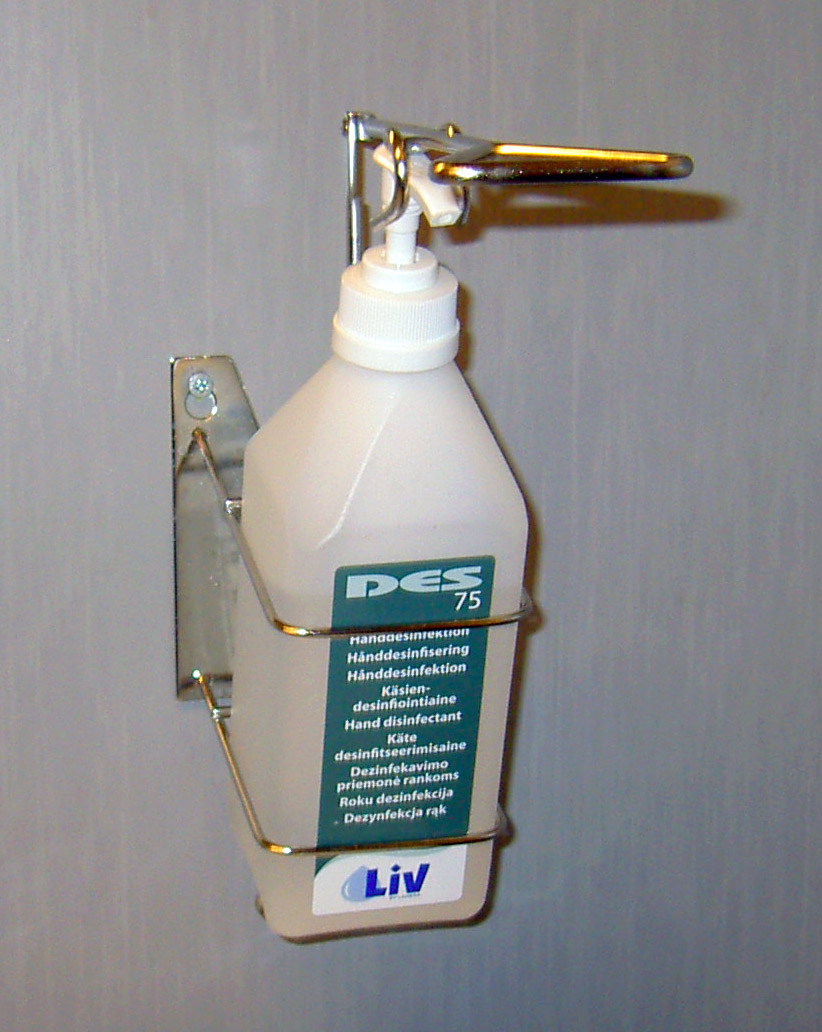
Hand alcohol in a hospital

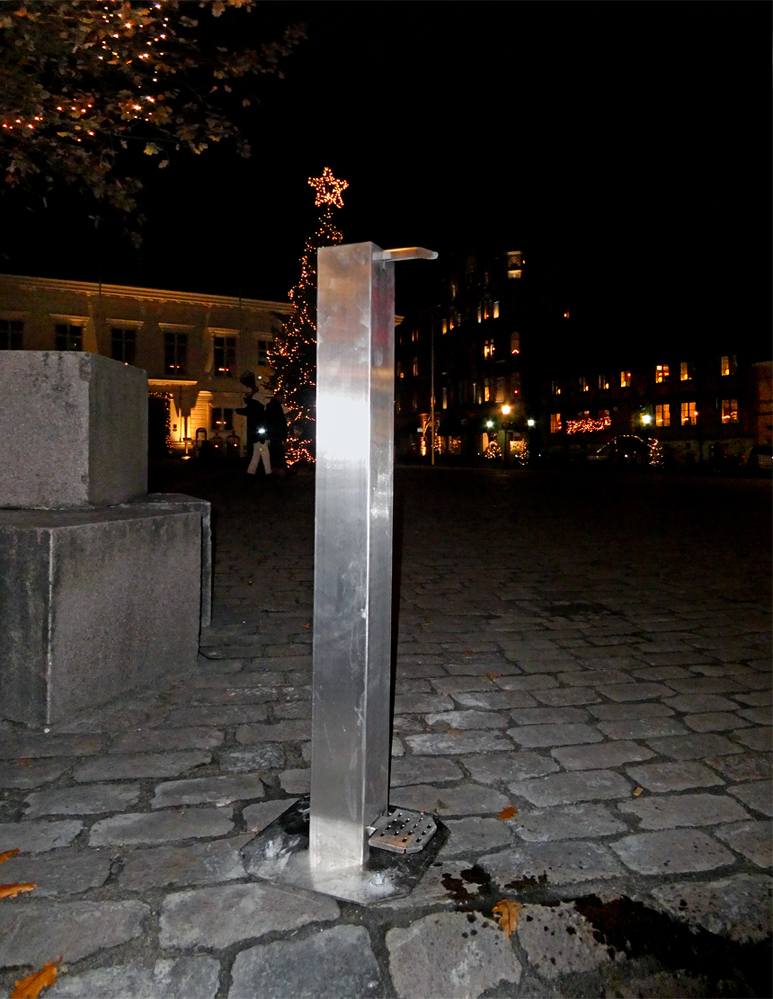
A pump with hand alcohol in a square in Ystad, Sweden, on 28 November 2020.

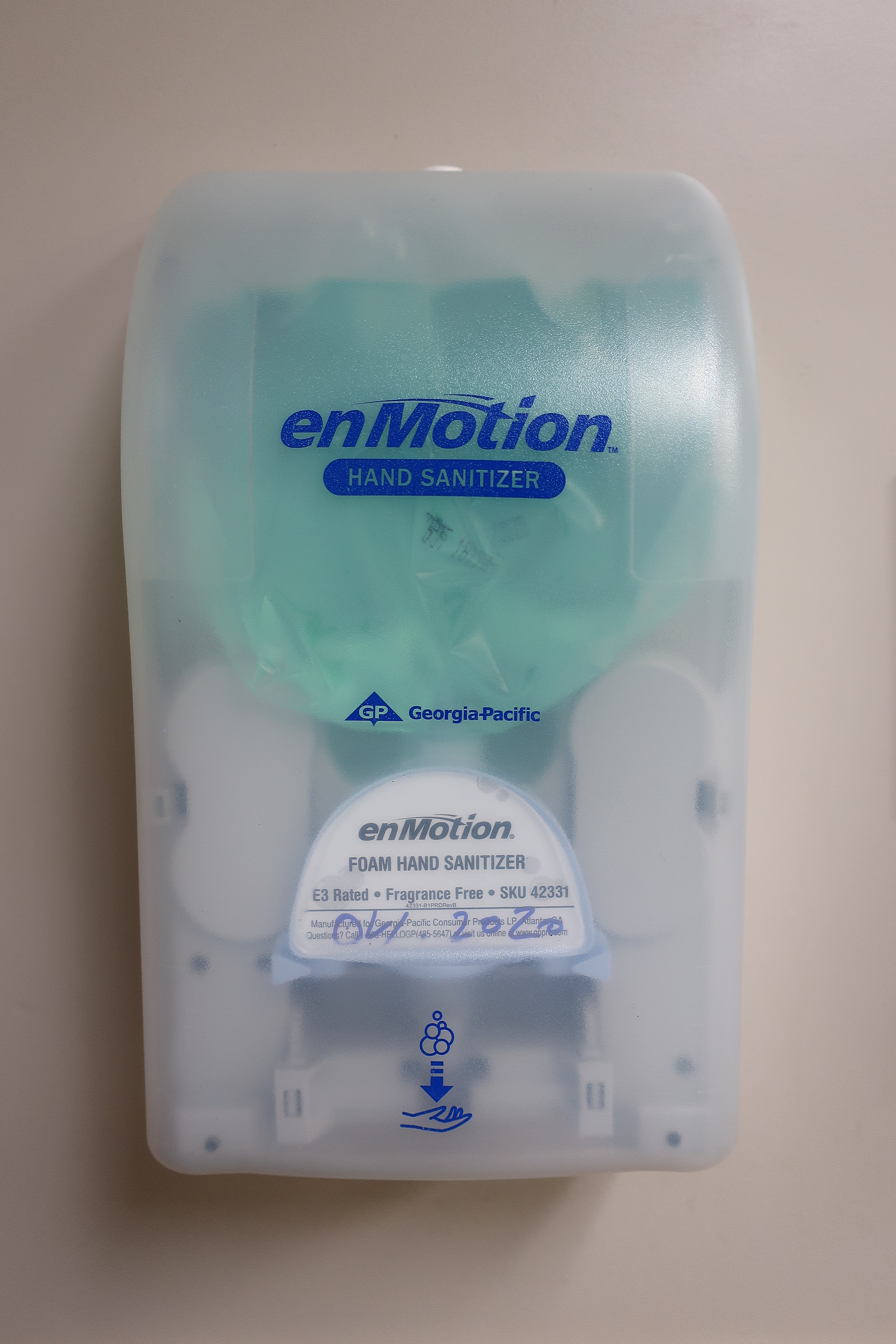
An automated hand sanitizer dispenser

Hand sanitizers were first introduced in 1966 in medical settings such as hospitals and healthcare facilities. The product was popularized in the early 1990s.

Alcohol-based hand sanitizer is more convenient compared to hand washing with soap and water in most situations in the healthcare setting. Among healthcare workers, it is generally more effective for hand antisepsis, and better tolerated than soap and water. Hand washing should still be carried out if contamination can be seen or following the use of the toilet. Before consuming food, or touching dirty surfaces and objects should also require hand washing.

Hand sanitizer that contains at least 60% alcohol or contains a "persistent antiseptic" should be used. Alcohol rubs kill many different kinds of bacteria, including antibiotic resistant bacteria and TB bacteria. They also kill many kinds of viruses, including the flu virus, the common cold virus, coronaviruses, and HIV.

90% alcohol rubs are more effective against viruses than most other forms of hand washing. Isopropyl alcohol will kill 99.99% or more of all non-spore forming bacteria in less than 30 seconds, both in the laboratory and on human skin.

In too low quantities (0.3 ml) or concentrations (below 60%), the alcohol in hand sanitizers may not have the 10–15 seconds exposure time required to denature proteins and lyse cells. In environments with high lipids or protein waste (such as food processing), the use of alcohol hand rubs alone may not be sufficient to ensure proper hand hygiene.

For health care settings, like hospitals and clinics, optimum alcohol concentration to kill bacteria is 70% to 95%. Products with alcohol concentrations as low as 40% are available in American stores, according to researchers at East Tennessee State University.

Alcohol rub sanitizers kill most bacteria, and fungi, and stop some viruses. Alcohol rub sanitizers containing at least 70% alcohol (mainly ethyl alcohol) kill 99.9% of the bacteria on hands 30 seconds after application and 99.99% to 99.999% (Note: Medical research papers sometimes use "n-log" to mean a reduction of n on a (base 10) logarithmic scale graphing the number of bacteria, thus "5-log" means a reduction by a factor of 10^{5}, or 99.999%) in one minute.

For health care, optimal disinfection requires attention to all exposed surfaces such as around the fingernails, between the fingers, on the back of the thumb, and around the wrist. Hand alcohol should be thoroughly rubbed into the hands and on the lower forearm for a duration of at least 30 seconds and then allowed to air dry.

Use of alcohol-based hand gels dries skin less, leaving more moisture in the epidermis, than hand washing with antiseptic/antimicrobial soap and water.

Hand sanitizers containing a minimum of 60 to 95% alcohol are efficient germ killers. Alcohol rub sanitizers kill bacteria, multi-drug resistant bacteria (MRSA and VRE), tuberculosis, and some viruses (including HIV, herpes, RSV, rhinovirus, vaccinia, influenza, and hepatitis) and fungi. Alcohol rub sanitizers containing 70% alcohol kill 99.97% (3.5 log reduction, similar to 35 decibel reduction) of the bacteria on hands 30 seconds after application and 99.99% to 99.999% (4 to 5 log reduction) of the bacteria on hands 1 minute after application.

=== Drawbacks ===
There are certain situations during which hand washing with soap and water are preferred over hand sanitizer. These include: eliminating bacterial spores of Clostridioides difficile; parasites such as Cryptosporidium; and certain viruses like norovirus, depending on the concentration of alcohol in the sanitizer (95% alcohol was seen to be most effective in eliminating most viruses). In addition, if hands are visibly contaminated, hand washing is preferred. Handwashing is also preferable after using the toilet, and if discomfort develops from the residue of alcohol sanitizer use. Furthermore, the CDC states that hand sanitizers are not effective in removing chemicals such as pesticides.

== Safety ==
=== Fire ===
Alcohol gel can catch fire, producing a translucent blue flame. This is due to the flammable alcohol in the gel. Some hand sanitizer gels may not produce this effect due to a high concentration of water or moisturizing agents. There have been some rare instances where alcohol has been implicated in starting fires in the operating room, including a case where alcohol used as an antiseptic pooled under the surgical drapes in an operating room and caused a fire when a cautery instrument was used. Alcohol gel was not implicated.

To minimize the risk of fire, alcohol rub users are instructed to rub their hands until dry, which indicates that the flammable alcohol has evaporated. Igniting alcohol hand rub while using it is rare, but the need for this is underlined by one case of a health care worker using hand rub, removing a polyester isolation gown, and then touching a metal door while her hands were still wet; static electricity produced an audible spark and ignited the hand gel. Hand sanitizer should be stored in temperatures below 105 °F and should not be left in a car during hot weather due to risk of flammability. Fire departments suggest refills for the alcohol-based hand sanitizers can be stored with cleaning supplies away from heat sources or open flames.

=== Skin ===
Researchers have not thoroughly studied the implications of hand sanitizer use for the body and the microbiome. Studies of healthcare workers have correlated high rates of hand eczema with hand sanitizer use.

The alcohol in hand sanitizer strips the skin of the outer layer of oil, which may have negative effects on barrier function of the skin. A study also shows that disinfecting hands with an antimicrobial detergent results in a greater barrier disruption of skin compared to alcohol solutions, suggesting an increased loss of skin lipids.

Frequent use of alcohol-based hand sanitizers can cause dry skin unless emollients and/or skin moisturizers are added to the formula. The drying effect of alcohol can be reduced or eliminated by adding glycerin and/or other emollients to the formula. In clinical trials, alcohol-based hand sanitizers containing emollients caused substantially less skin irritation and dryness than soaps or antimicrobial detergents. Allergic contact dermatitis, contact urticaria syndrome or hypersensitivity to alcohol or additives present in alcohol hand rubs rarely occur. The lower tendency to induce irritant contact dermatitis became an attraction as compared to soap and water hand washing.

=== Ingestion ===
In the United States, the U.S. Food and Drug Administration (FDA) controls antimicrobial handsoaps and sanitizers as over-the-counter drugs (OTC) because they are intended for topical anti-microbial use to prevent disease in humans.

The FDA requires strict labeling which informs consumers on proper use of this OTC drug and dangers to avoid, including warning adults not to ingest, not to use in the eyes, to keep out of the reach of children, and to allow use by children only under adult supervision. According to the American Association of Poison Control Centers, there were nearly 12,000 cases of hand sanitizer ingestion in 2006. If ingested, alcohol-based hand sanitizers can cause alcohol poisoning in small children. However, the U.S. Centers for Disease Control recommends using hand sanitizer with children to promote good hygiene, under supervision, and furthermore recommends parents pack hand sanitizer for their children when traveling, to avoid their contracting disease from dirty hands.

Denaturants are an ingredient added to hand sanitizers, such as Purell, that is used to stop the liquid gel from being digested. This chemical adds a taste to the gel that makes it less enticing to consume. It is especially helpful in keeping younger children away because of the different smells and colors of hand sanitizers that tend to attract children.

People with alcoholism may attempt to consume hand sanitizer in desperation when traditional alcoholic beverages are unavailable, or personal access to them is restricted by force or law. There have been reported incidents of people drinking the gel in prisons and hospitals to become intoxicated. As a result, access to sanitizing liquids and gels is controlled and restricted in some facilities. For example, over a period of several weeks during the COVID-19 pandemic in New Mexico, seven people in that U.S. state who were alcoholic were severely injured by drinking sanitizer: three died, three were in critical condition, and one was left permanently blind.

In 2021, a dozen children were hospitalized in the state of Maharashtra, India, after they were mistakenly orally administered hand sanitizer instead of a polio vaccine.

=== Absorption ===
On 30 April 2015, the FDA announced that they were requesting more scientific data based on the safety of hand sanitizer. Emerging science suggests that for at least some health care antiseptic active ingredients, systemic exposure (full body exposure as shown by detection of antiseptic ingredients in the blood or urine) is higher than previously thought, and existing data raise potential concerns about the effects of repeated daily human exposure to some antiseptic active ingredients. This would include hand antiseptic products containing alcohol and triclosan.

=== Surgical hand disinfection ===
Hands must be disinfected before any surgical procedure by hand washing with mild soap and then hand-rubbing with a sanitizer. Surgical disinfection requires a larger dose of the hand-rub and a longer rubbing time than is ordinarily used. It is usually done in two applications according to specific hand-rubbing techniques, EN1499 (hygienic handwash), and German standard DIN EN 1500 (hygienic hand disinfection) to ensure that antiseptic is applied everywhere on the surface of the hand.

=== Alcohol-free ===
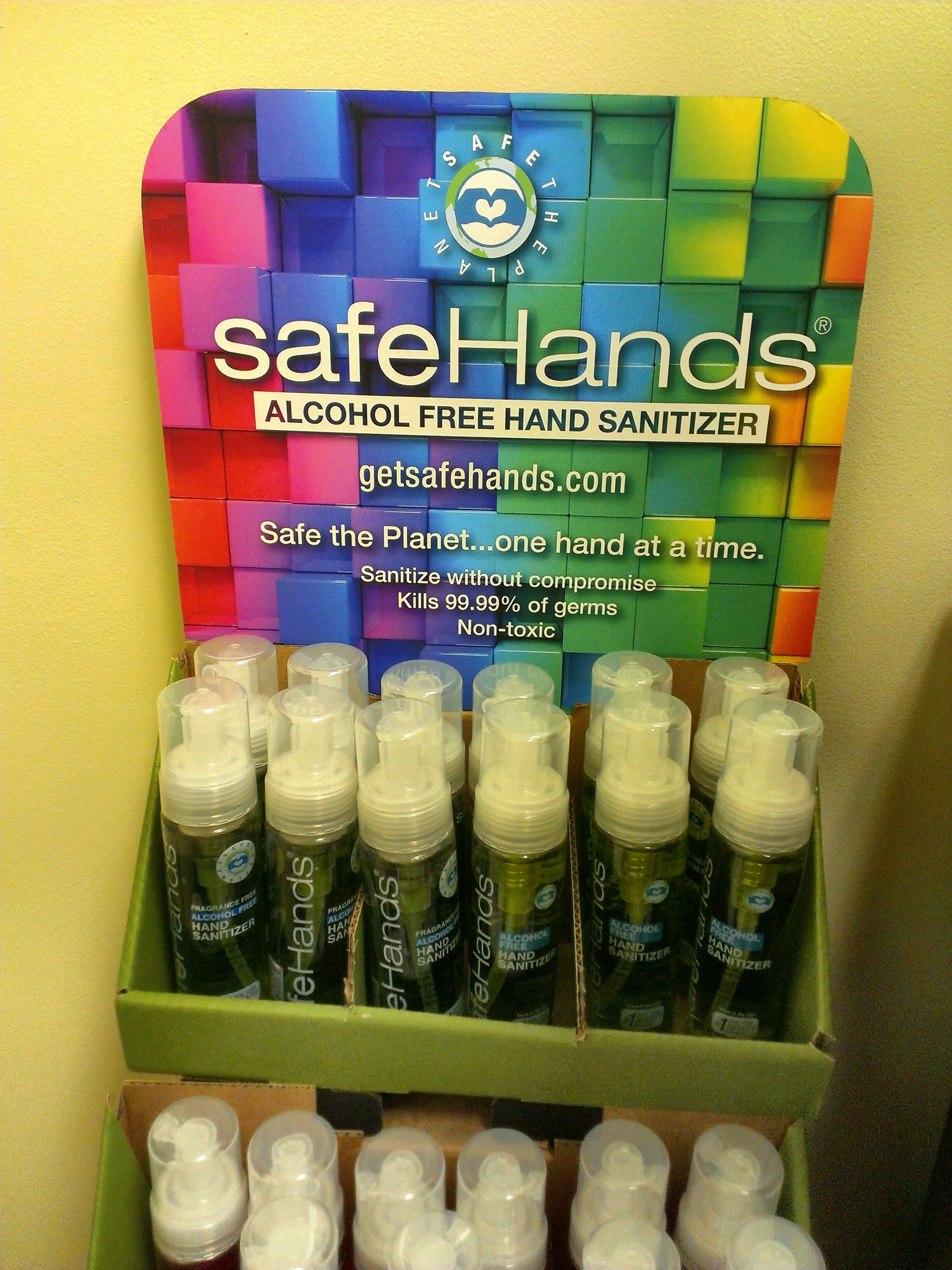
Alcohol free hand sanitizer

Some hand sanitizer products use agents other than alcohol to kill microorganisms, such as povidone-iodine, benzalkonium chloride or triclosan. The World Health Organization (WHO) and the CDC recommends "persistent" antiseptics for hand sanitizers. Persistent activity is defined as the prolonged or extended antimicrobial activity that prevents or inhibits the proliferation or survival of microorganisms after application of the product. This activity may be demonstrated by sampling a site several minutes or hours after application and demonstrating bacterial antimicrobial effectiveness when compared with a baseline level. This property also has been referred to as "residual activity." Both substantive and nonsubstantive active ingredients can show a persistent effect if they substantially lower the number of bacteria during the wash period.

Laboratory studies have shown lingering benzalkonium chloride may be associated with antibiotic resistance in MRSA. Tolerance to alcohol sanitizers may develop in fecal bacteria. Where alcohol sanitizers utilize 62%, or higher, alcohol by weight, only 0.1 to 0.13% of benzalkonium chloride by weight provides equivalent antimicrobial effectiveness.

Triclosan has been shown to accumulate in biosolids in the environment, one of the top seven organic contaminants in wastewater according to the National Toxicology Program Triclosan leads to various problems with natural biological systems, and triclosan, when combined with chlorine e.g. from tap water, produces dioxins, a probable carcinogen in humans. However, 90–98% of triclosan in wastewater biodegrades by both photolytic or natural biological processes or is removed due to sorption in wastewater treatment plants. Numerous studies show that only very small traces are detectable in the effluent water that reaches rivers.

A series of studies show that photodegradation of triclosan produced 2,4-dichlorophenol and 2,8-dichlorodibenzo-p-dioxin (2,8-DCDD). The 2,4-dichlorophenol itself is known to be biodegradable as well as photodegradable. For DCDD, one of the non-toxic compounds of the dioxin family, a conversion rate of 1% has been reported and estimated half-lives suggest that it is photolabile as well. The formation-decay kinetics of DCDD are also reported by Sanchez-Prado et al. (2006) who claim "transformation of triclosan to toxic dioxins has never been shown and is highly unlikely."

Alcohol-free hand sanitizers may be effective immediately while on the skin, but the solutions themselves can become contaminated because alcohol is an in-solution preservative and without it, the alcohol-free solution itself is susceptible to contamination. However, even alcohol-containing hand sanitizers can become contaminated if the alcohol content is not properly controlled or the sanitizer is grossly contaminated with microorganisms during manufacture. In June 2009, alcohol-free Clarcon Antimicrobial Hand Sanitizer was pulled from the US market by the FDA, which found the product contained gross contamination of extremely high levels of various bacteria, including those which can "cause opportunistic infections of the skin and underlying tissues and could result in medical or surgical attention as well as permanent damage". Gross contamination of any hand sanitizer by bacteria during manufacture will result in the failure of the effectiveness of that sanitizer and possible infection of the treatment site with the contaminating organisms.

== Types ==
Alcohol-based hand rubs are extensively used in the hospital environment as an alternative to antiseptic soaps. Hand-rubs in the hospital environment have two applications: hygienic hand rubbing and surgical hand disinfection. Alcohol based hand rubs provide a better skin tolerance as compared to antiseptic soap. Hand rubs also prove to have more effective microbiological properties as compared to antiseptic soaps.

The same ingredients used in over-the-counter hand-rubs are also used in hospital hand-rubs: alcohols such as ethanol and isopropanol, sometimes combined with quaternary ammonium cations (quats) such as benzalkonium chloride. Quats are added at levels up to 200 parts per million to increase antimicrobial effectiveness. Although allergy to alcohol-only rubs is rare, fragrances, preservatives and quats can cause contact allergies. These other ingredients do not evaporate like alcohol and accumulate leaving a "sticky" residue until they are removed with soap and water.

The most common brands of alcohol hand rubs include Aniosgel, Avant, Sterillium, Desderman and Allsept S. All hospital hand rubs must conform to certain regulations like EN 12054 for hygienic treatment and surgical disinfection by hand-rubbing. Products with a claim of "99.99% reduction" or 4-log reduction are ineffective in hospital environment, since the reduction must be more than "99.99%".

The hand sanitizer dosing systems for hospitals are designed to deliver a measured amount of the product for staff. They are dosing pumps screwed onto a bottle or are specially designed dispensers with refill bottles. Dispensers for surgical hand disinfection are usually equipped with elbow controlled mechanism or infrared sensors to avoid any contact with the pump.

== Composition ==
Consumer alcohol-based hand sanitizers, and health care "hand alcohol" or "alcohol hand antiseptic agents" exist in liquid, foam, and easy-flowing gel formulations. Products with 60% to 95% alcohol by volume are effective antiseptics. Lower or higher concentrations are less effective; most products contain between 60% and 80% alcohol.

In addition to alcohol (ethanol, isopropanol or n-Propanol), hand sanitizers also contain the following:

- additional antiseptics such as chlorhexidine and quaternary ammonium derivatives,
- sporicides such as hydrogen peroxides that eliminate bacterial spores that may be present in ingredients,
- emollients and gelling agents to reduce skin dryness and irritation,
- a small amount of sterile or distilled water,
- sometimes foaming agents, colorants or fragrances.

=== WHO formulations ===
The World Health Organization has published the following formulations to guide to the production of large quantities of hand sanitizer from chemicals available in developing countries, where commercial hand sanitizer may not be available:

==== Formulation 1 ====
Ingredient	Volume required (10-L prep.)	Active ingredient % (v/v)
Ethanol 96%	8333 mL	80%
Glycerol 98%	145 mL	1.45%
Hydrogen peroxide 3%	417 mL	0.125%
Distilled water	added to 10000 mL	18.425%

==== Formulation 2 ====
Ingredient	Volume required (10-L prep.)	Active ingredient % (v/v)
Isopropyl alcohol 99.8%	7515 mL	75%
Glycerol	145 mL	1.45%
Hydrogen peroxide 3%	417 mL	0.125%
Distilled water	added to 10000 mL	23.425%

== Production ==
=== COVID-19 pandemic ===
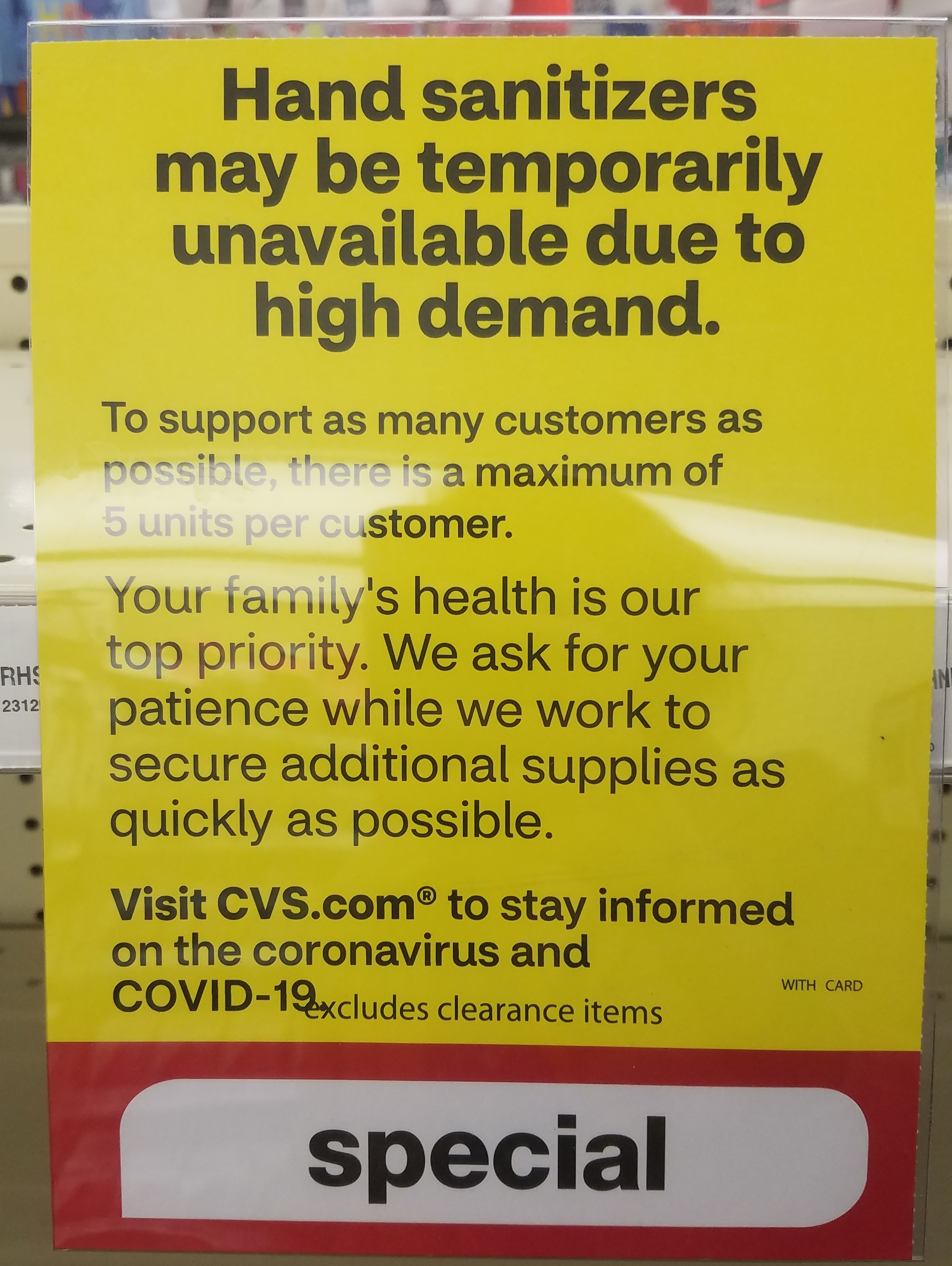
A notice about hand sanitizer coronavirus shortages at a CVS Pharmacy on 17 March 2020

In 2010 the World Health Organization produced a guide for manufacturing hand sanitizer, which received renewed interest in 2020 because of shortages of hand sanitizer in the wake of the COVID-19 pandemic. Dozens of liquor and perfume manufacturers switched their manufacturing facilities from their normal product to hand sanitizer. In order to keep up with the demand, local distilleries started using their alcohol to make hand sanitizer. Distilleries producing hand sanitizer originally existed in a legal grey area in the United States, until the Alcohol and Tobacco Tax and Trade Bureau declared that distilleries could produce their sanitizer without authorization.

In the beginnings of the pandemic, because of hand sanitizer shortages due to panic buying, people resorted to using 60% to 99% concentrations of isopropyl or ethyl alcohol for hand sanitization, typically mixing them with glycerol or soothing moisturizers or liquid contain aloe vera to counteract irritations with options of adding drops of lemon or lime juice or essential oils for scents, and thus making DIY hand sanitizers. However, there are cautions against making them, such as a wrong measurement or ingredient may resulting in an insufficient amount of alcohol to kill the coronavirus, thus rendering the mixture ineffective or even poisonous.

Additionally, some commercial products are dangerous, either due to poor oversight and process control, or fraudulent motive. In June 2020, the FDA issued an advisory against use of hand sanitizer products manufacture by Eskbiochem SA de CV in Mexico due to excessive levels of methanol – up to 81% in one product. Methanol can be absorbed through the skin, is toxic in modest amounts, and in substantial exposure can result in "nausea, vomiting, headache, blurred vision, permanent blindness, seizures, coma, permanent damage to the nervous system or death". Products suspected of manufacture by Eskbiochem SA with excessive methanol have been reported as far away as British Columbia, Canada.

In August 2020, the FDA expanded the list of dangerous hand sanitizers.

== See also ==
- List of cleaning products
