= Hazard quotient =

Measure of potential health effects from exposure

A hazard quotient is the ratio of the potential exposure to a substance and the level at which no adverse effects are expected. If the Hazard Quotient is calculated to be less than 1, then no adverse health effects are expected as a result of exposure. If the Hazard Quotient is greater than 1, then adverse health effects are possible. The Hazard Quotient cannot be translated to a probability that adverse health effects will occur, and is unlikely to be proportional to risk. A Hazard Quotient exceeding 1 does not necessarily mean that adverse effects will occur.
