= Tincture of iodine =

Antiseptic solution rubbed on skin before surgical operations

Iodine tincture
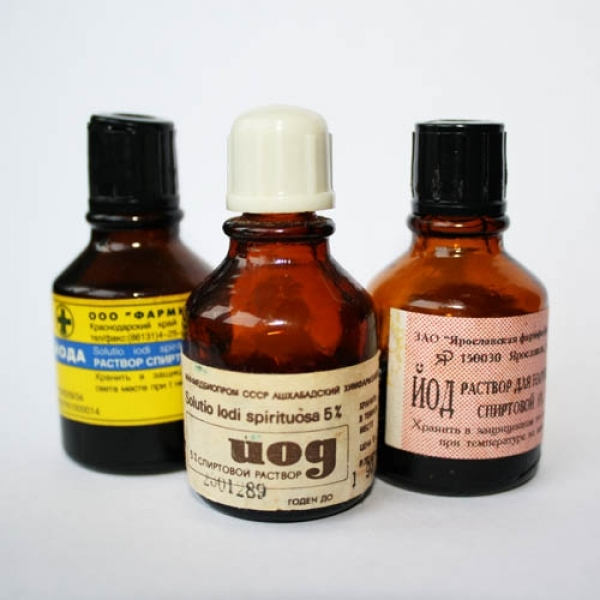
- Various bottles of tincture of iodine from the former Soviet Union

Clinical data
- AHFS/Drugs.com: Monograph
- Pregnancy category: D
- Routes of administration: Topical
- ATCvet code: QD08AG (WHO)

Identifiers
- IUPAC name: diiodane
- CAS Number: 7553-56-2
- PubChem CID: 807
- DrugBank: DB05382
- UNII: 9679TC07X4

Chemical and physical data
- Formula: I_{2}

Tincture of iodine, iodine tincture, or weak iodine solution is an antiseptic tincture containing iodine, ethanol and water. It is usually 2% elemental iodine, along with potassium iodide or sodium iodide, dissolved in a mixture of ethanol and water.

It was used from at least 1907 in emergency pre-operative skin preparation by the Italian surgeon Antonio Grossich; three years later, an experimental study at the University of Genoa’s Institute of Hygiene resulted in a mere 3% infection rate in injuries treated by Grossich’s disinfection method, as against 21% in those treated by the prevailing method. In the United Kingdom, the development of an iodine solution for skin sterilisation was pioneered by Lionel Stretton. The British Medical Journal published the detail of his work at Kidderminster Infirmary in 1909. Stretton used a much weaker solution than that used by Grossich. He claimed in 1915 that Grossich had been using a liquid akin to Liquor Iodi Fortis, and that it was he, Stretton, who had introduced the method using Tincture of Iodine BP, which came to be used across the world.

== USP formulas ==
USP Tincture of Iodine is defined in the U.S. National Formulary (NF) as containing in each 100 mL, 1.8 to 2.2 grams of elemental iodine, and 2.1 to 2.6 grams of sodium iodide. Alcohol is 50 mL, and the balance is purified water. This "2% free iodine" solution has 0.08 mol/L of I_{2}, which provides about 1 mg of free iodine per 0.05 mL drop. The "2% free iodine" description is based on the quantity of elemental iodine, not sodium/potassium iodide.

USP Strong Iodine Tincture is defined in the NF as containing in each 100 mL, 6.8 to 7.5 grams of iodine, and 4.7 to 5.5 grams of potassium iodide. Purified water is 50 mL and the balance is alcohol. This 7% tincture solution is about 3.5 times more concentrated than USP 2% tincture.

As in the case of Lugol's iodine, the role of iodide in the solution is to increase the solubility of the elemental iodine, by turning it to the soluble triiodide anion I_{3}^{−}. However, since iodine has moderate solubility in ethanol, it is also assisted by this solvent directly. Lugol's iodine, by contrast, has no alcohol, and has twice the mass of potassium iodide as of elemental iodine. Alcohol content in the tincture of iodine can be determined by the methods of Alcock, Roscoe – Schorlemmer and Thurston – Thurston.

== Usage ==
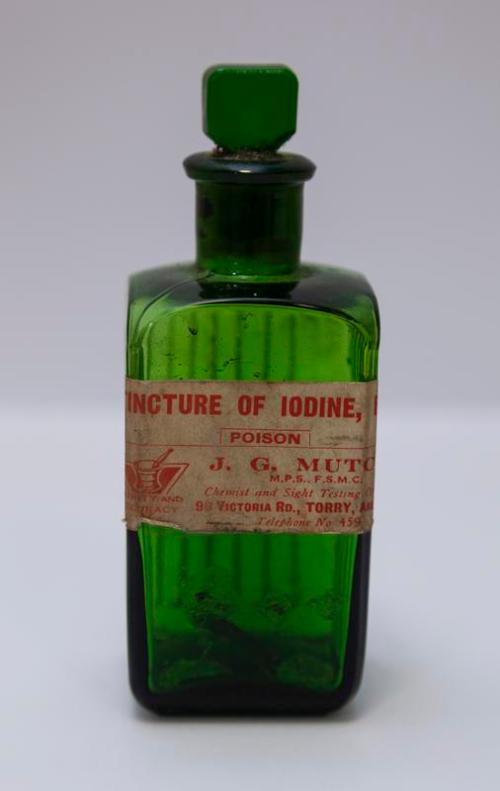
Tincture of Iodine from ship's medicine chest

As both USP solutions contain elemental iodine, which is moderately toxic when ingested in amounts larger than those required to disinfect water, tincture of iodine is sold labelled “for external use only,” and used primarily as a disinfectant.

Tincture of iodine is often found in emergency survival kits, used both to disinfect wounds and to sanitize surface water for drinking. When an alcohol solution is not desirable for this purpose, the alcohol-free Lugol's iodine, an aqueous solution of iodine in potassium iodide solution, or else povidone-iodine (brand names Wokadine, Betadine), a PVPI solution, can be used.

Small amounts may be added to suspect drinking water as a disinfectant (typically 5 mg free iodine per liter, or 5 drops of 2% tincture). Though this treatment is effective against bacteria and viruses, it does not protect against protozoan parasites such as Cryptosporidium and Giardia.

Iodine solution is used to sanitize the surface of fruit and vegetables from bacteria and viruses. The common concentration for sanitization is 25 ppm iodophor for 1 minute. However, the effectiveness depends on whether the solution penetrates into rifts, and whether dirt is effectively removed at first. The oocytes of protozoan parasites will not be killed, and it is also doubtful that bacterial spores will be killed. Iodine solutions should not be considered able to sanitize or disinfect salad, fruit or vegetables that are contaminated with feces.

Iodine tincture is not a recommended source of solely-nutritional iodine. Nutritional iodine is better supplied in the form of the less toxic iodide (see SSKI) or iodate salts, which the body can easily convert to thyroid hormone.

Nevertheless, the iodide in tincture of iodine used as a water disinfectant does supply more than adequate nutritional iodine, perhaps 30 or more times the recommended daily allowance per liter or quart. Application of tincture or Lugol's to the skin also results in absorption and bioavailability of some moderate fraction of the iodine. This method can be used to saturate the thyroid with iodine to help prevent the excessive uptake of radioactive iodine-131 in a nuclear accident.

== See also ==
- Antiseptic
- Cadexomer iodine
- Chlorhexidine
- Iodophor
- Inadine
- Louis Melsens
- Povidone-iodine
- Lugol's iodine
- Brilliant green (dye)
- Triple dye
