= Ortiz Morales =

Ortíz Morales
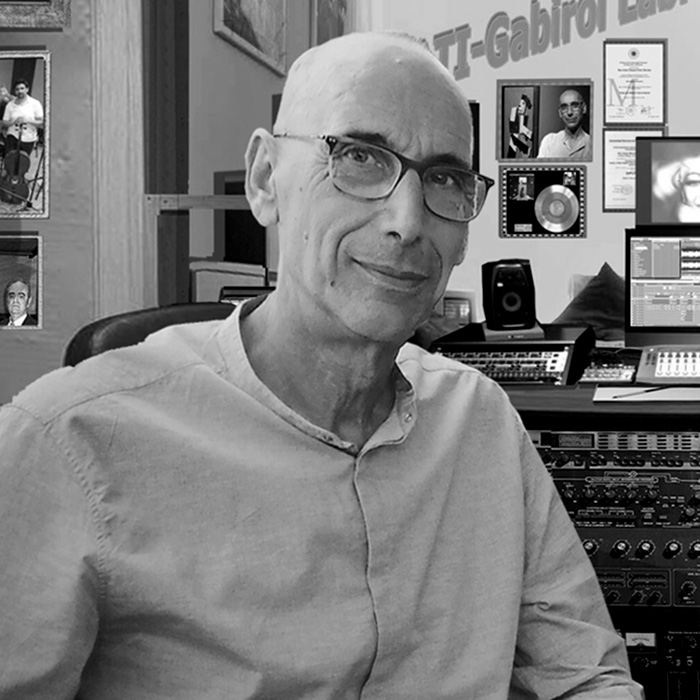

Background information
- Born: Jesús Manuel; January 24, 1959 (age 67); Málaga, Spain
- Genre: Ruidismo (Noise music)
- Occupations: Composer, instrumentalist, researcher, educator
- Instruments: Electric bass, guitar, viola, keyboards, computers
- Years active: 1975–present
- Labels: RCA, CBS, Sony
- Website: http://ortizmorales.info/

Ortíz Morales, Jesús Manuel (Málaga, 24 January 1959) is a Spanish noise and experimental composer (Ruidismo). Alias: Ommalaga

== Career ==
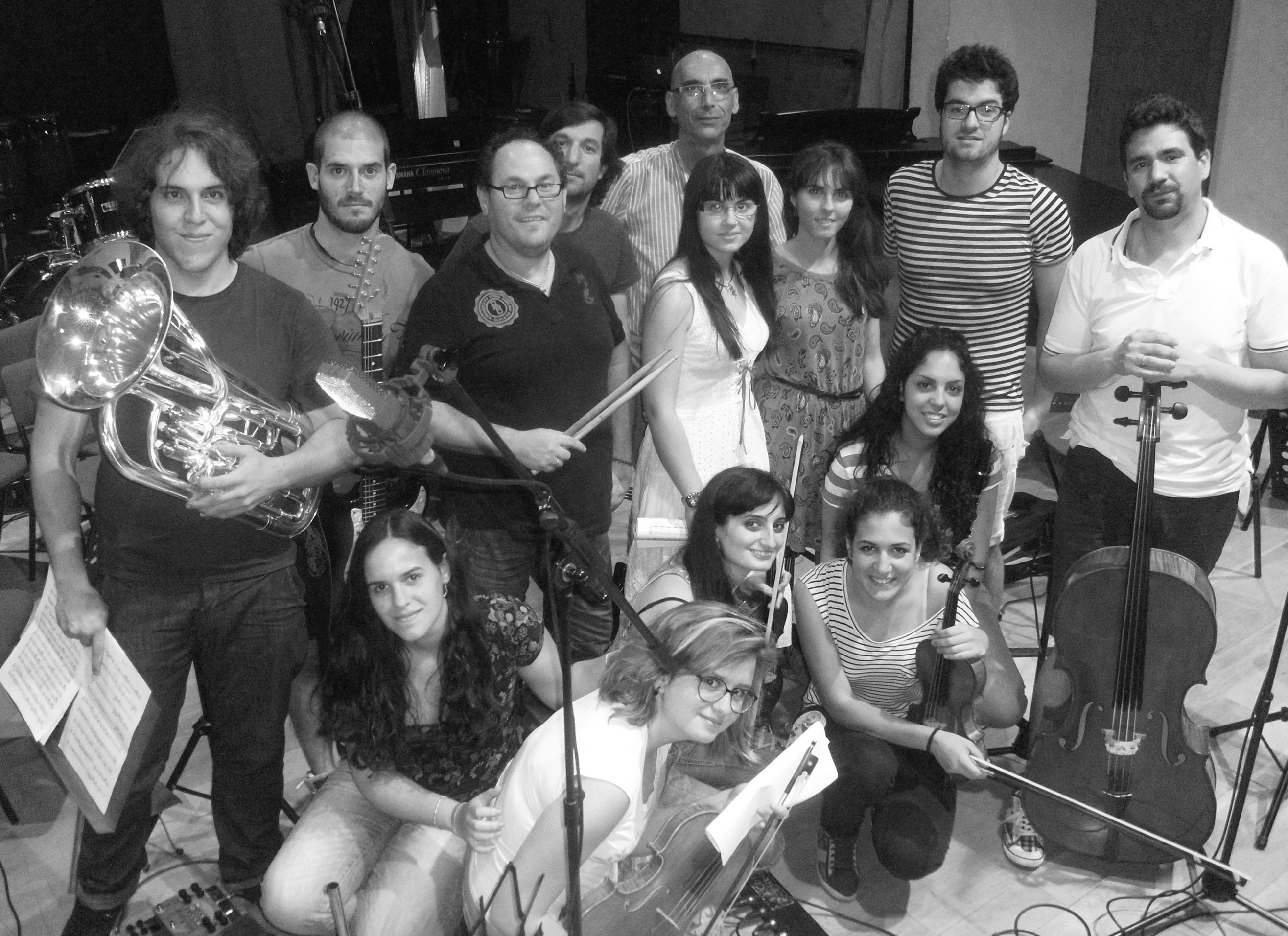
Ortiz Morales & KinematikoM (2012)

Ortiz Morales is an experimental musician, audiovisual producer, and academic researcher, specializing in neofuturism and noise music, with a diverse catalog of sound experimentation albums. He was the director of the digital lab ATI-Gabirol Lab. for many years and is the founder or co-founder of the rock groups Tabletom and The Xilom Orchestra, the contemporary Music workshops TMC-CSMM (at the Málaga Higher Conservatory of Music), the jazz band La Insostenible Big Band, and the kinematic ensemble Kiné-matik-oM. PhD in Audiovisual Communication, specializing in the reconstruction of sound contexts in Futurist and Dadaist audiovisual synchronism. His doctoral thesis focused on archaeotechnology, specifically on the first audiovisual mixing console in history ("Charles Delacommune's Synchro-Ciné," UMA 2012), and his master's thesis explored cinematic reconstructions ("Le Ballet mécanique and the Synchro-Ciné," UMA 2008). He holds a Expert postgraduate degree in New Technologies and a Master's degree in Educational Computing from the ETSII-UNED (School of Industrial Engineering - National University of Distance Education). He teaches composition, guitar, and violin as adjunct professorships in the superior Conservatories of Córdoba, Granada, and Málaga (in Spain), teaching courses in Harmony & New Technologies; Gothic Counterpoint & Musical Forms; and Contemporary Music Workshops & Music for Audiovisual MultiMedia Workshops, respectively). His stylistic trajectory is varied, both as an instrumentalist (electric bass, guitar, viola, keyboards and computers) and in his compositional musical styles: with an initial stage (1974-1987) as a rock musician (groups Tabletom and Veneno), a shorter one as a symphonic musician (1984-1992: CSMM young orchestra and Málaga Symphonic orchestra), a later one, already as a composer and conductor, in experimental chamber music and minimalist music (1992-1998) and a final, more extended one, from approximately 1998 to the present. His work encompasses electroacoustic styles, and especially neo-futurist noise and musique concrète, where he has produced most of his experimental and investigative sound material (more sound art than music), in addition to his technical work, including the release of over 20 Dadaist and Expressionist films with specially created noise and machine-based soundtracks. He was included by the SGAE (Spanish Society of Authors and Publishers) in the 2002-2003 anthology of electroacoustic composers for his sound work "Kish."

Much of his work has been educational and outreach-oriented, with numerous lectures and publications on Futurism and Dadaism (many also on progressive and alternative rock of the 60s and 70s). Independent producer since 1982 with the alternative production company Ommalaga Prod., dedicated to experimental media and music education & pedagogy and outreach materials (among other things, he has patented some computer software such as the universal digital music cipher system "Rameau", and the software for generating old classical futuristic sounds, "El Intonarumori Digital," and published several articles on musical history and techniques, as well as contributing to various art publications). He has created music and theme songs for various media outlets, including RTVE ("Brigada Central" TV serie), RNE, RTVA, Canal Sur, and Metro-Málaga.

He has also worked in video art and reconstructive infographics. He is a recipient of one of the Eduardo Ocón Awards from the Málaga Provincial Council. From his early career, with work for RCA, Nuevos Medios and CBS (now part of the Sony catalog), perhaps his best-known works are the albums Mezclalina (1980) and Si tú, si yo (1984). From his more recent work, possibly the audiovisual reconstruction of the canonical version of the 1924 film Ballet mécanique (2016) and the album Abzu (2001), a fairly comprehensive compendium of diverse techniques applied to electroacoustic music at that time, ranging from mathematized and vectorized MIDI processes to stochastic processes developed specifically for special purposes using the C-Sound language, including filtering and resonance manipulations, and fragments of musique concrète and soundscapes. Since 2022, he has retired from performing and public life, dedicating himself to compiling and publishing previously unrecorded material, remastering it, or adding updated videos.

== Discography ==
- (1980) Mezclalina Tabletom Canterbury rock
- (1981) Recuerdos del futuro Tabletom Rock
- (1982) Rayya Tabletom Rock
- (1985) Algo tuyo Veneno Andalusian Rock
- (1987) Pequeño salvaje' Kiko Veneno Rock
- (2000) Música Contemporánea (Chamber music)
- (2003) Antologia Electroacústica (Electroacoustic music)

Solo (and with TMC-CSMM & KINEMATIKOM)

- (1994) Música Inútil (Minimalist and experimental music)
- (1999) Abzu (Electroacoustic music / Noise)
- (2005) Dilmún (Mixed neofuturist music)
- (2009) Ki (Neofuturist and electroacoustic music)
- (2015) Ea (Experimental Music. Noise Music)
- (2016) Sirrush (Noise mixed techniques. Ruidismo)
- (2017) Irkalla (Noise. Concrete music)
- (2020) Sumer (Harsh noise. Extreme noise)
- (2022) Interlingua Musical (Avant-garde. Noise. Concrete music)
- (2023) Moloch (Avant-garde. Experimental. Concrete music)
- (2023) Great Failures Compilation. (Noise. Experimental. Concrete music)
- (2024) AI (Dingir) (Oppressive music: Noise & Industrial)
- (2025) Ruidismo (Noise & Neofuturism & Concrete music)
