= ATC code D03 =

ATC code D03 Preparations for treatment of wounds and ulcers is a therapeutic subgroup of the Anatomical Therapeutic Chemical Classification System, a system of alphanumeric codes developed by the World Health Organization (WHO) for the classification of drugs and other medical products. Subgroup D03 is part of the anatomical group D Dermatologicals.

Codes for veterinary use (ATCvet codes) can be created by placing the letter Q in front of the human ATC code: for example, QD03. ATCvet codes without corresponding human ATC codes are cited with the leading Q in the following list.
National versions of the ATC classification may include additional codes not present in this list, which follows the WHO version.

== D03A Cicatrizants ==
=== D03AX Other cicatrizants ===
D03AX01 Cadexomer iodine
D03AX02 Dextranomer
D03AX03 Dexpanthenol
D03AX04 Calcium pantothenate
D03AX05 Hyaluronic acid
D03AX06 Becaplermin
D03AX09 Crilanomer
D03AX10 Enoxolone
D03AX11 Sodium chlorite (tetrachlorodecaoxide)
D03AX12 Trolamine
D03AX13 Betulae cortex
D03AX14 Centella asiatica herba, incl. combinations
D03AX15 Trafermin
D03AX16 Beremagene geperpavec
D03AX17 Diperoxochloric acid
QD03AX90 Ketanserin

== D03B Enzymes ==
=== D03BA Proteolytic enzymes ===
D03BA01 Trypsin
D03BA02 Clostridiopeptidase
D03BA03 Bromelains
D03BA52 Collagenase, combinations
