= Cadexomer iodine =

Chemical compound

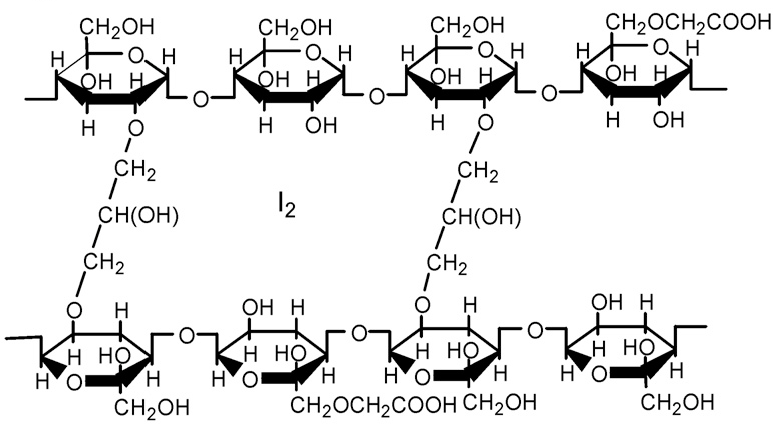

Clinical data
- AHFS/Drugs.com: International Drug Names
- ATC code: D03AX01 (WHO)

Identifiers
- CAS Number: 94820-09-4
- ChemSpider: none

Cadexomer iodine is an iodophor that is produced by the reaction of dextrin with epichlorhydrin coupled with ion-exchange groups and iodine. It is a water-soluble modified starch polymer containing 0.9% iodine, calculated on a weight-weight basis, within a helical matrix.

== History ==
Cadexomer iodine was developed in the early 1980s in Sweden by Perstorp AB, and given the name Iodosorb. The product was shown to be effective in the treatment of venous ulcers. More recently, it has been shown in studies in animals and humans that, unlike the iodophor povidone-iodine, Iodosorb causes an acceleration of the healing process in chronic human wounds. This is due to an increase in epidermal regeneration and epithelialization in both partial-thickness and full-thickness wounds. In this way cadexomer iodine acts as a cicatrizant.

== Properties ==
When formulated as a topical wound dressing, Iodosorb adsorbs exudate and particulate matter from the surface of granulating wounds and, as the dressing becomes moist, iodine is released. The product thus has the dual effect of cleansing the wound and exerting a bactericidal action. The bactericidal mechanism of cadexomer iodine is effective against methicillin-resistant Staphylococcus aureus (MRSA) and may prevent MRSA proliferation in the wound bed. This is especially significant because bacteria populations have shown no sign of developing a resistance to iodine since it was first used for wound treatment in the middle of the 19th century.

== Uses ==
In addition to other manufacturers, Smith & Nephew distributes cadexomer iodine as Iodosorb and Iodoflex in many countries of the world for the treatment and healing of various types of wounds. The dosage forms are a paste dressing, an ointment and a gel, all of which contain 0.9% iodine. It is available in India under brand name Cadomer and is sold by JB Chemicals.

== See also ==
- Antiseptic
- Chlorhexidine
- Iodophor
- Inadine
- Povidone-iodine
- Lugol's iodine
- Tincture of iodine
