= Jewelry hygiene =

Area of study

Jewelry hygiene is an area of study focusing on sanitary practices and habits relating to jewelry in an effort to understand jewelry's effect on hand hygiene. There are four key elements to optimally sanitizing jewelry: steam or hot water, water pressure and an antibacterial cleaning agent. Hand hygiene is particularly acute for health workers and those working in the food service industry.

== Jewelry and hand contamination ==
The relationship between wearing rings and the transmission of microorganisms is still unclear. The Centers for Disease Control and Prevention guideline has categorized this as an "unresolved issue" in need of additional research; the draft WHO guidelines also do not have a stated recommendation against the wearing of rings but note that "the consensus recommendation is to discourage the wearing of rings or other jewelry during healthcare." A number of studies have shown that ring wearing increases the likelihood of bacterial contamination; in particular these studies have demonstrated that the skin under rings can be more heavily colonized than areas of skin without rings and can be a major contributor to hand contamination.

Trick et al. (2003) studied 66 surgical intensive care unit nurses, culturing each hand before and after the staff nurse performed hand hygiene; they found that wearing rings was associated with a 10-fold higher median count of skin microorganisms, especially with yeast species or Gram-negative bacilli and a stepwise increase risk of contamination with any transient organism as the number of rings worn increased.

Another study states that rings were the only substantial risk factor for carriage of Gram-negative bacteria and S. aureus on the hands. Salsbury et al. (1997) found that there was a higher reduction after hand washing by healthcare workers without rings than by those with rings. The study included 100 hospital healthcare workers who worked on general medical and surgical units, excluding those who had used antimicrobial soap in the previous two weeks, had artificial nails, or were receiving antibiotics. Each healthcare worker who wore rings was paired with a worker from the same unit who did not wear rings. Cultures were taken from the solution poured over each healthcare worker's hands as they performed a 60-second friction rinse, done both before and after a routine handwash. Mean total colony counts for those who wore rings were higher before and after hand washing.

Hoffman et al. (1985) reports that mean bacterial counts were higher on ring-wearing fingers (1600 compared to 180 for non-ring wearing fingers). They survey included 50 nurses working on medical and surgical wards who permanently wore rings and studied the microorganisms isolated from skin under the rings. Forty percent of these nurses (20 nurses) had Gram-negative bacilli on the skill under their rings, and 16 of these 20 nurses still had most strains each time the nurses were sampled during the five-month study. A similar study found that even after washing hands with povidone-iodine, those with rings had higher bacterial counts than those without. The published research appears to show that jewelry is a significant vehicle for the transmission of pathogens and a driver of hand contamination.

== Starbucks announces new dress code guidelines ==
In 2009 the Food and Drug Administration updated its Food Code policy. In chapter two entitled "Management & Personnel" they addressed the issue of food-borne illness as it relates to the wearing of jewelry in the work place. To reduce the spread of pathogens and avoid potential cross contamination, the wearing jewelry on the hands was restricted to just plain rings only. "Except for a plain ring such as a wedding band, while preparing food, food employees may not wear jewelry including medical information jewelry on their arms and hands." Jewelry located on the hands and arms can serve as a growth medium for bacteria resulting in food poisoning. In November 2014, Starbucks Corporation issued new guidelines for food safety. Starbucks U.S. Retail Dress Code Guidelines

In anticipation of doubling their food offerings in the next 5 years, Their spokesman said "Starbucks new jewelry guidelines are based on the FDA Model Food Code that state and local jurisdictions follow. We've also been working with Registered Environmental Health Specialists who are former FDA health inspectors to ensure these changes align with food safety rules." In the guidelines employees who handle food are required to remove all gemstone rings, all bracelets and all watches. The only exception is a plain gold wedding band.

Jewelry hygiene expert David Bellman reacted to the announcement a few days later stating "This new policy change in long over due; in 2014, 1 in 6 Americans experienced some form of food poisoning and based on our research, contaminated jewelry is clearly playing a meaningful role." Food safety is a major concern but heavy bacteria loads on jewelry also contribute to the spread of infections at home and in hospitals. Bellman sees human behavior as the culprit, "Through the generations we have been conditioned to believe that jewelry is to be worn and rarely removed or cleaned. Yet, when you think about it, would you wear the same shirt or pants day after day for 6 months without cleaning them? he suggests "Give your jewelry the same consideration you give your clothes, your dishes or your home. Remove the largest single source of bacteria on your body and you will reduce food poisoning and infections for yourself and your family"

Starbucks is one of the largest food retailers in the U.S. to enforce these FDA guidelines for food safety and it is expected that more retailers will likely follow their lead in the coming year.
