= ATCvet code QD51 =

Veterinary medical products classification subgroup

ATCvet code QD51 Products for the treatment of claws and hoofs is a therapeutic subgroup of the Anatomical Therapeutic Chemical Classification System for veterinary medicinal products, a system of alphanumeric codes developed by the World Health Organization (WHO) for the classification of drugs and other medical products for veterinary use. Subgroup QD51 is part of the anatomical group QD Dermatologicals.

National issues of the ATC classification may include additional codes not present in this list, which follows the WHO version.

This group is empty.
