= Ballet Mécanique =

1924 film

- The film
- Directed by: Fernand Léger; Dudley Murphy
- Written by: Fernand Léger
- Starring: Alice Prin
- Cinematography: Dudley Murphy; Man Ray
- Music by: George Antheil
- Release date: 24 September 1924 (Austria)
- Running time: 19 minutes
- Country: France
- Languages: Silent film French intertitles

Ballet Mécanique is a 1924 French Dadaist, post-Cubist art film conceived, written, and co-directed by the artist Fernand Léger and the filmmaker Dudley Murphy (with cinematographic input from Man Ray). It has a musical score by the American composer George Antheil. The film premiered in a silent version on 24 September 1924 at the Internationale Ausstellung neuer Theatertechnik (International Exposition for New Theater Technique) in Vienna presented by Frederick Kiesler. It is considered to be a major work of early experimental filmmaking.

== Film credit and history ==
In her book Dudley Murphy: Hollywood Wild Card, film historian Susan Delson writes that Murphy was the film's driving force but that Léger was more successful at promoting the film as his own creation. However, some scholars argue that Léger conceived of the film himself, as part of his making the dazzling effects of mechanical technology the exclusive subject of his art; this after fighting at the front in World War I and spending the year of 1917 in a hospital after being gassed there.

This controversy might be settled by observing that the 1924 version of the film, in its opening moments, credits Léger and Murphy equally. Despite that, the credits in the opening moments of a 2016 reconstruction mention only Léger.

Léger's experiences in World War I had a significant effect on all of his work. Mobilized in August 1914 for service in the French army, he spent two years at the front in Argonne. He produced many sketches of artillery pieces, airplanes, and fellow soldiers while in the trenches, and painted Soldier with a Pipe (1916) while on furlough. In September 1916, he almost died after a mustard gas attack by the German troops at Verdun. During a period of convalescence in Villepinte, he painted The Card Players (1917), a canvas whose robot-like, monstrous figures reflect the ambivalence of his experience of war. As he explained:

... I was stunned by the sight of the breech of a 75 millimeter in the sunlight. It was the magic of light on the white metal. That's all it took for me to forget the abstract art of 1912–1913. The crudeness, variety, humor, and downright perfection of certain men around me, their precise sense of utilitarian reality and its application in the midst of the life-and-death drama we were in ... made me want to paint in slang with all its color and mobility.

The Card Players marked the beginning of his "mechanical period" of which Ballet Mécanique is a part, an artistic technique that combined the dynamic abstraction of constructivism with the absurd and unruly qualities of Dada. We see this trend in the film from beginning to end.

However, a photo of a Dada sculpture with the name Ballet Mécanique had been previously featured in 391, a periodical created and edited by the Dadaist Francis Picabia that first appeared in January 1917 and continued to be published until 1924. It is not known if Fernand Léger was aware of it or not.

=== Visual puns ===
In its original release, the film's French title was "Charlot présente le ballet mécanique" (as seen on the original print), referring to Charlie Chaplin's Little Tramp character as he was known in France. The image of a Cubist-style paper puppet of Charlot, by Leger, appears several times in the film. It is only the first of many visual puns in the film—a seeming display of the film's sheer visual modernity, as intended by its creators from the get-go.

== Ballet Mécanique as a score ==
=== Composition ===
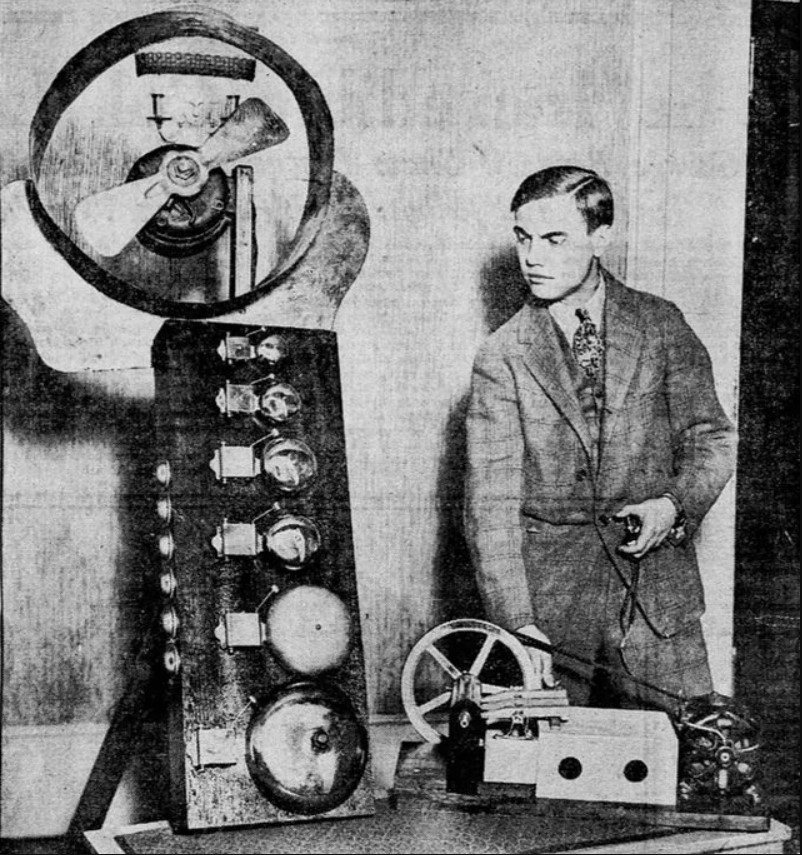
Antheil posing with one of the "noisemakers" he built for Ballet Mécanique, c. early 1920s

George Antheil's Ballet Mécanique (1924) was originally conceived as an accompaniment for the film and was scheduled to be premiered at the Internationale Ausstellung neuer Theatertechnik. However, before completion, director and composer agreed to go their separate ways. The musical work runs close to 30 minutes, while the film is about 19 minutes long.

Antheil's music for Ballet Mécanique became a concert piece, premiered by Antheil himself in Paris in 1926. As a composition, it is Antheil's best known and most enduring work. It remains famous for its radical repetitive style and instrumentation, as well as its storied history. The original orchestration called for 16 player pianos (or pianolas) in four parts, 2 regular pianos, 3 xylophones, at least 7 electric bells, 3 propellers, siren, 4 bass drums, and 1 tam-tam. As it turned out, there was no way to keep so many pianolas synchronized, so early performances combined the four parts into a single set of pianola rolls and augmented the two human-played pianos with 6 or more additional instruments.

Antheil assiduously promoted the work and even engineered his supposed "disappearance" while on a visit to Africa so as to get media attention for a preview concert. The official Paris première in June 1926 was sponsored by an American patroness who at the end of the concert was tossed in a blanket by three baronesses and a duke. The work enraged some of the concertgoers, whose objections were drowned out by the cacophonous music, while others vocally supported the work. After the concert, there were some fights in the street. Antheil tried to replicate this scandal at Carnegie Hall by hiring provocateurs, but they were largely ignored.

In concert performance, Ballet Mécanique is not a show of human dancers but of mechanical instruments. Among these, player pianos, airplane propellers, and electric bells stand prominently onstage, moving as machines do, and providing the visual side of the ballet. As the bizarre instrumentation may suggest, this was no ordinary piece of music; it was loud and percussive, a medley of noises, much as the Italian Futurists envisioned new music of the 20th century.

In 1927, Antheil arranged the first part of the Ballet for Welte-Mignon. This piano-roll was performed on 16 July 1927 at the "Deutsche Kammermusik Baden-Baden 1927". Unfortunately, these piano rolls are now thought to be lost.

=== Later history ===
In 1953, Antheil wrote a shortened (and much tamer) version for 4 pianos, 4 xylophones, 2 electric bells, 2 propellers, timpani, glockenspiel, and other percussion. The original orchestration was first realized in 1992 by Maurice Peress.

In 1986, the film was premiered with a new score by Michael Nyman.

In 1999, the University of Massachusetts Lowell Percussion Ensemble, under the direction of Jeff Fischer, presented the first performance of the original score (without the film) using 16 player pianos and live players. The player pianos were Yamaha Disklaviers, controlled via MIDI using the Macintosh software program Opcode StudioVision.

Although the film was intended to use Antheil's score as a soundtrack, the two parts were not brought together until much later. In 2000, Paul Lehrman produced a married print of the film. This version of the film was included in the DVD collection Unseen Cinema: Early American Avant Garde Film 1894–1941 released in October 2005 and also in the DVD set Bad Boy Made Good, which also contains Lehrman's documentary film about Antheil and the Ballet mécanique, which was released in April 2006. Lehrman used an edited version of the original orchestration in which he used player pianos recorded after the Lowell performance, with the rest of the instruments played electronically.

In November 2002, a version of the score for live ensemble (which required further editing, since live players couldn't play it as fast as electronic instruments) was premiered in Columbus, Ohio by an ensemble from the Peabody Conservatory of Music, conducted by Julian Pellicano. The performance, with the newly realized soundtrack and the 1952 version of Ballet mécanique, was repeated at the Friedberg Concert Hall at Peabody Conservatory on February 17, 2003. The work was then performed in Montreal at the Montréal/Nouvelles Musiques festival, conducted by Walter Boudreau. This version was then performed a dozen times in Europe by the London Sinfonietta in 2004 and 2005.

In 2005, the National Gallery of Art in Washington, DC commissioned Lehrman and the League of Electronic Musical Urban Robots (LEMUR), Eric Singer, director, to create a computer-driven robotic ensemble to play Ballet mécanique. This installation was at the Gallery from 12 March to 7 May 2006. It was installed in December 2007 at the Wolfsonian Museum in Miami Beach, FL, and again at 3-Legged Dog in New York City, where it was used to accompany a play about Antheil and Hedy Lamarr, and their invention of spread-spectrum technology, called Frequency Hopping. During the run of the play, the Léger/Murphy film was shown, with the robotic orchestra performing the score, at two special "after-concerts."

=== Analysis ===
It is in a sonata rondo form with the following sections: [AB] [A′C] [A″B″] [Coda] pattern, where A is a first theme, B is a second theme, and C is a middle section loosely related to A and B:

- A – Theme 1 starts at the beginning of the piece. It is easily identified by the oscillating melody in the xylophones. It moves through rhythmic and intervallic variations until a bridge into the next theme (m. 38 in the original scoring).
- B – Theme 2 (m. 77) features the pianolas, supported by drums. The melody is mostly built from parallel series of consonant chords, sometimes sounding pentatonic but often making no tonal sense at all. Antheil uses pianolas for things that would be difficult for human players (a 7-note chord at m. 142, for example).
- A′ – Xylophones return in triple meter to recall Theme 1 (m. 187). This is not strictly a repeat of Theme 1 but another variation and development upon it. This section descends into increasing chaos (starting m. 283) which signals a transition into part C (m. 328).
- C – The xylophones and pianolas play a new tune. They stay in better rhythmic agreement here and give a more ordered feel to this section. The xylophones eventually cut out to make way for a serene pianola passage.
- A″B″ – The xylophones return (m. 403) with the theme from the beginning. There are differences from the original AB part, including new bitonal passage (m. 530) and miniature round (m. 622) between xylophones and pianolas. The pentatonic melody, hinted in part B, returns (m. 649) and gets developed in the context of the round.
- Coda – A startling change occurs when all instruments cut out except for a lone bell (m. 1134). This signals the beginning of a very long and thinly textured coda. It alternates between irregular measures of complete silence and pianola with percussion. The measures of silence get longer until the listener begins to wonder whether the piece is already over. Finally, there is a crescendo of pianola, a flurry of percussion and a bang to mark the real ending. The score indicates the last measure of the piece to be ended with the pianos and drums only, but modern performances have the xylophones joining back in and doubling the melody of the pianolas to create a more firm, solid, and recognizable ending.

The mechanical pianos keep the tempo strictly at = 152. All longer rests in the pianola part are notated in 8th rests, as if to suggest the exactness of the instrument. At this rate, the 1920s pianola played 8.5 feet per minute of paper rolls over three rolls. This logistical nightmare has been described by some scholars as being an error, and that Antheil's suggested tempo was actually half that = 76, but in fact Antheil's 1953 Ballet Mécanique score indicates a tempo of 144–160.

The airplane propellers were actually large electric fans, into which musicians would insert object such as wooden poles or leather straps to create sound, since the fans don't make much noise. In the Paris performances, beginning in June 1926, the fans were pointed up at the ceiling. However, at the Carnegie Hall premiere on 10 April 1927, the fans were positioned to blow into the audience, upsetting the patrons.

== Ballet Mécanique as synchronized film ==
Nevertheless, with respect to the original synchronized film, and despite the quality of last sound performance and its consistent reliability with Antheil's original plans for its concert (made by Lehrman himself and endorsed by the Schirmer publisher for the DVD Unseen Cinema: Early American Avant Garde Film 1894–1941, 2005), its timing with the film it is still in full debate today.

New points of view were offered by Ortiz Morales in his thesis, El ballet mécanique y el Synchro-ciné, in 2008. He discusses most of the points of view that have given origin to the realization of Lehrman and proposes other alternatives within what he calls the state of confusion around the film. Among others, the score of 30 minutes and 16 synchronized pianolas so laboriously obtained is not really the original musical idea for the film, but a subsequent expansion of the original idea, which was carried out by Antheil as a spectacular and independent concert, once proved that it could not synchronize its music together with the images of Léger. The true film score must have been much simpler and more precise, possibly for solo pianola and noise machines, and, after various reductions and modifications, close to the one he would end up orchestrating in 1935. It argues, therefore, that the problem of original synchronization was never in the 16 synchronized pianolas of the giant score, but the problem with the simple version (for the film) must have been in the device that had to synchronize it mechanically : the Synchro-Ciné of the inventor Charles Delacommune, possibly the first audio-visual mixing table in history and with which it is known that they were desperately trying for a while (as is documented) the material for that film, signed by Léger and Delacommune). According to technical studies on documentation (the apparatus as such was lost in II World War), it seems that the synchro-ciné was a synchronizer capable of good audio-video simultaneities in standard measures, but the fleeting and devilish rhythm of the work far exceeded its possibilities: especially the complex rhythms, of 7 and 5, very used in the work and impossible to obtain with a such precarious device. With a more restrained and square music, they could have been tuned and synchronized mechanically, which was what Léger promised to the press after talking to Delacommune (but before having tried it in practice with the music of Antheil).

This thesis was reinforced in 2016 with the publication of the reconstruction of cinematic synchronism according to the so-called Canonical version (i.e., based on the "tempo-spatial" rhythmic patterns, or audiovisual "canons of proportions" which Léger and Antheil are known to have used to coordinate, or at least attempt to coordinate, images and music. This version, made by Ortiz Morales with the collaboration of the Ensemble Modern, uses algorithms to search the exact copy of the film and the correct Antheil score, which they both joined in 1935 (the only time they know that proper 'timing' occurred, according to themselves). Thus, in each period, a slightly different copy of the Ballet has circulated. That explains, in part, doubts about its ascription to a certain aesthetic.

The most modern and complete study on the subject, that of Elder, from 2018 (Cubism and Futurism), supports, in whole or in part, those same ideas. Especially in the verification of the existence of many different versions of the film (12 at least, plus some others lost); in which the Delacommune system of synchronization was called in 1924 "Synchronismes Cinématographiques", abbreviated "Synchro-Ciné", before becoming the name of its own production company, and was the one that was tried to be used in the original synchronization with unsuccessful result; in that the original music for Antheil's "Ballet" was most likely a different version of the famous 16 synchronized player pianos and was for either a Photoplayer or a simple player piano with a single roll; in that since 1927 there have been various modifications of the film, and of the score, each time shorter and tighter; and in that the theories of Moritz generally accepted in the US about the almost exclusive Dadaism of the film are obviously exaggerated and do not correspond to the reality: Fernand Léger retouched the original film so much that the copies we know are much more cubist than dadaist.

== Discography (audio) ==
- "Ballet Mécanique" MusicMasters. Cond. Maurice Peress, 1992. 01612-67094-2
- "Fighting the Waves: Music of George Antheil." Ensemble Moderne, cond. HK Gruber. RCA, 1996.
- "George Antheil: Ballet Mécanique." Boston Modern Orchestra Project, cond. Gil Rose. BMOP/sound, 2013.
- "Ballet Mecanique and Other Works for Player Pianos, Percussion, and Electronics." UMass Lowell Percussion Ensemble, cond. Jeffrey Fischer. Electronic Music Foundation, 2000.
- "George Antheil Ballet Mecanique (1953)" (and other works by Antheil), Philadelphia Virtuosi Chamber Orchestra, Daniel Spalding, conductor, Naxos American Classics, 2001.

== Bibliography ==
- Buck, Robert T. et al. (1982). Fernand Léger. New York: Abbeville Publishers. ISBN 0-89659-254-5
- Chilvers, Ian & Glaves-Smith, John eds., Dictionary of Modern and Contemporary Art, Oxford: Oxford University Press, 2009.
- Delson, Susan (2006). "Vexed and Disputed: The Multiple Histories of Ballet Mécanique". Dudley Murphy, Hollywood Wild Card. Minneapolis: University of Minnesota Press. pp. 41–68. ISBN 978-0-8166-4654-8. OCLC 65978637.
- Elder, R.Bruce, Cubism and Futurism-spiritual machines and the cinematic effect. Ontario (Canadá) Wilfrid Laurier University Press, 2018. ISBN 978-1-77112-245-0. Pages 139-379.
- James Donald, "Jazz Modernism and Film Art: Dudley Murphy and Ballet mécanique in Modernism/modernity 16:1 (January 2009), pages 25–49
- Fitch, Noel Riley (1985). Sylvia Beach and the Lost Generation: A History of Literary Paris in the Twenties and Thirties. W. W. Norton & Company. ISBN 978-0-393-30231-8.
- Oja, Carol (2000). "George Antheil's Ballet Mécanique and Transatlantic Modernism". In Ludington, Townsend (ed.). A modern mosaic: art and modernism in the United States. Chapel Hill: University of North Carolina Press. pp. 175–202. ISBN 0-8078-4891-3.
- Oja, Carol J. (2000). Making Music Modern: New York in the 1920s. Oxford University Press. pp. 71–94. ISBN 978-0-19-516257-8.
- Néret, Gilles (1993). F. Léger. New York: BDD Illustrated Books. ISBN 0-7924-5848-6
- Ortiz Morales, J.M. (2012). "El Synchro-Ciné de Charles Delacommune" (PDF). Thesis COM/CAP.UMA-Málaga. Reg:2012/00200020399.
- Richter, H. Dada: Art and Anti-Art (Thames and Hudson 1965)
