= Iodophor =

Soluble complex that can release iodine

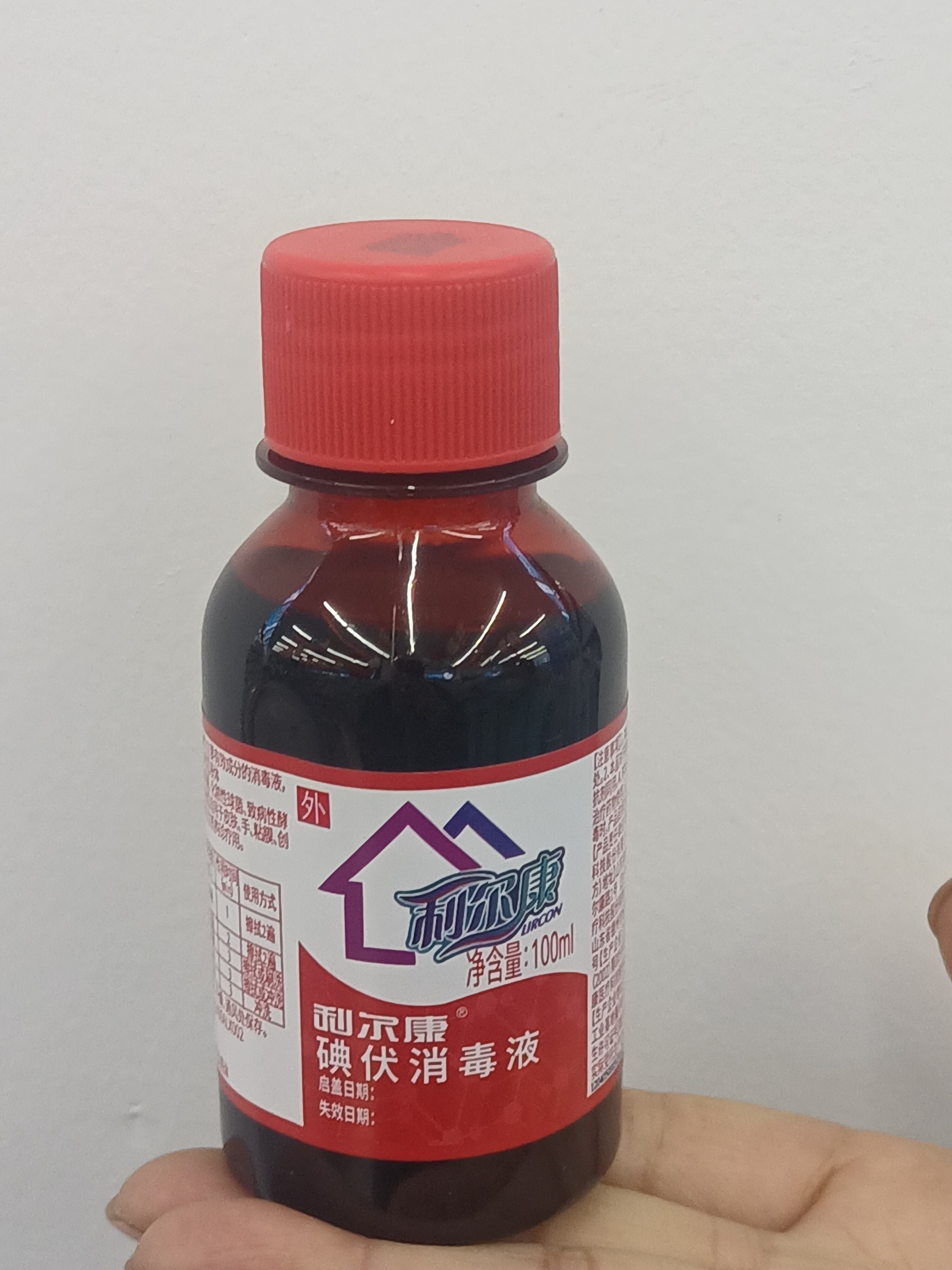
Medical iodophor (Chinese povidone-iodine solution)

An iodophor is a preparation containing iodine complexed with a solubilizing agent, such as a surfactant or water-soluble polymers such as povidone (forming povidone-iodine). The result is a water-soluble material that releases free iodine when in solution.

Iodophors are prepared by mixing iodine with the solubilizing agent; heat can be used to speed up the reaction. Besides povidone, polyvinyl alcohol, starch derivatives (e.g. dextrin forming cadexomer iodine), chitosan and cellulose have also been used as solubilizing agents.

== Commercial use ==
Diluted iodophor is often used by brewers and winemakers to sanitize equipment and bottles. Its major advantage over other sanitizers is that when used in proper proportions, it does not require rinsing. However, it can leave unattractive orange-brown stains on plastic parts and equipment if left in contact with them. It is often supplied in different concentrations and is further diluted with water before use. The label will advise the appropriate dilution ratio, commonly 1:1000 or 1:100. Equipment to be sanitized should be thoroughly clean and left in contact with the solution for at least 2 minutes.

Diluted iodophor is used extensively in the dairy industry for disinfecting milking parlors, particularly in the United Kingdom. Continued use of this disinfectant has helped maintain the high iodide content in UK cow's milk, which was historically important in the elimination of goiter in the UK.

=== Application guidelines ===
Iodophors are most effective in an acidic medium (pH 2 to pH 5) but are effective up to pH 7. It is gradually inactivated by proteins if the pH rises above 4 and is inactivated if the temperature rises above 50°C, as the iodine is driven off as a gas. The optimum concentration is >200 mg/L free iodine with a contact time of 2 minutes and 100 mg/L free iodine for cleaned and dried equipment. In a nonfood-contact application the concentration may rise to 500 – 800 mg/L.

== Human toxicity ==
"Based on a review of the available toxicology data, the [US EPA] has concluded that iodine and iodophor complexes are of very low toxicity by the oral, dermal, and inhalation routes of exposure."

== See also ==
- Povidone-iodine
- Cadexomer iodine
- Tincture of iodine
