= Tabletom =

- Origin: Málaga, Andalusia, Spain
- Genres: Progressive rock, Andalusian rock, jazz rock, reggae rock, flamenco rock
- Years active: 1976–present
- Labels: RCA Records, Nuevos Medios, Cambayá
- Members: Salva Marina, Pedro "Perico" Ramírez, José "Pepillo" Ramírez, Jorge Blanco Montes, Manuel Nocete, Carlos Campos Palomo
- Past members: Roberto "Rockberto" González, Ortiz Morales, Javier Denis, Francisco Oliver, Salvador Zurita
- Website: http://www.tabletom.es

Tabletom is a Spanish musical group formed in Málaga in 1976. Their music blends elements of jazz, rock, reggae, blues, and flamenco, making them one of the most eclectic and unconventional bands in the Andalusian rock scene.

== History ==
Tabletom was created in 1976 by vocalist Roberto "Rockberto" González, Ortiz Morales (bass, violin), Javier Denis (oboe, sax), Paco Oliver (drums) and brothers Pedro "Perico" (guitar) and José Manuel "Pepillo" Ramírez (flute). The band, who lived in an anarcho-hippie rural commune, became part of the musical counterculture of Málaga during the late 1970s.

The group released its debut album, Mezclalina, in 1980. The recording was produced by Ricardo Pachón and presented a mixture of jazz, rock, reggae, blues and flamenco influences, which become a defining characteristic of the group. Contemporary commentary describes the album as representative of the experimental rock scene in Málaga.

Throughout the 1980s, the band struggled with poor record label support and financial limitations (because it does not have an easily marketable and sellable "label" in its complex musical style) leading to reduced activity. They temporarily disbanded in 1985.

Tabletom reformed in 1990. A later song, "Me estoy quitando," first released by the band, gained additional recognition when the Spanish rock group Extremoduro recorded a version of it on their 1996 album Agila.

In May 2011, the band's original singer, Roberto "Rockberto" González, died in Málaga after a long illness. A biography about his life and musical work was later published. Following Rockberto's death, the band continued performing with new vocalist Salva Marina.

== Musical style ==
Tabletom's music incorporates progressive rock structures with Andalusian musical traditions and elements of jazz improvisation, reggae rhythms, blues, and flamenco phrasing.

== Members ==
=== Current members ===
- Salva Marina – vocals
- Pedro "Perico" Ramírez – guitar
- José "Pepillo" Ramírez – saxophone, flute
- Jorge Blanco Montes – bass
- Manuel Nocete – keyboards
- Carlos Campos Palomo – drums

=== Former members ===
- Roberto "Rockberto" González – vocals (1976–2011)
- Ortiz Morales – bass, violin (1976–1985)
- Javier Denis – oboe, saxophones (1976–1981)
- Salvador Zurita – drums (1976–1982)

== Discography ==
=== Studio albums ===
- Mezclalina (1980)
- Rayya (1983)
- Inoxidable (1992)
- La parte chunga (1998)
- 7.000 kilos (2002)
- Sigamos en las nubes (2008)
- Luna de Mayo (2016)
- Clara (2025)

=== EPs ===
- Recuerdos del futuro (1985)

=== Live albums ===
- Vivitos... y coleando (1996)
- Cantes de ida y vuelta (2014)
