= Trafermin =

Medication

Clinical data
- Trade names: Fiblast
- Other names: CAB-2001; Recombinant human basic fibroblast growth factor; rhbFGF; 2-155-Basic fibroblast growth factor (human clone lambdaKB7/lambdaHFL1 precursor reduced)
- Routes of administration: Topical (spray)
- ATC code: D03AX15 (WHO)

Identifiers
- CAS Number: 131094-16-1
- PubChem SID: 17397511
- ChemSpider: none
- UNII: 333OX80X87
- KEGG: D03362

Chemical and physical data
- Formula: C_{764}H_{1201}N_{217}O_{219}S_{6}
- Molar mass: 17122.67 g·mol^{−1}

Trafermin (brand name Fiblast), also known as recombinant human basic fibroblast growth factor (rhbFGF), is a recombinant form of human basic fibroblast growth factor (bFGF) which is marketed in Japan as a topical spray for the treatment of skin ulcers. It is also currently in preregistration for the treatment of periodontitis. As a recombinant form of bFGF, trafermin is a potent agonist of the FGFR1, FGFR2, FGFR3, and FGFR4. The drug has been marketed in Japan since June 2001.
