= ATCvet code QG51 =

Veterinary medical products classification subgroup

ATCvet code QG51 Antiinfectives and antiseptics for intrauterine use is a therapeutic subgroup of the Anatomical Therapeutic Chemical Classification System for veterinary medicinal products, a system of alphanumeric codes developed by the World Health Organization (WHO) for the classification of drugs and other medical products for veterinary use. Subgroup QG51 is part of the anatomical group QG Genito-urinary system and sex hormones.

National versions of the ATC classification may include additional codes not present in this list, which follows the WHO version.

== QG51A Antiinfectives and antiseptics for intrauterine use ==
=== QG51AA Antibacterials ===
QG51AA01 Oxytetracycline
QG51AA02 Tetracycline
QG51AA03 Amoxicillin
QG51AA04 Gentamicin
QG51AA05 Cefapirin
QG51AA06 Rifaximin
QG51AA07 Cefquinome
QG51AA08 Chlortetracycline
QG51AA09 Formosulfathiazole

=== QG51AD Antiseptics ===
QG51AD01 Povidone-iodine
QG51AD02 Policresulen
QG51AD03 Peroxy-acetic acid
QG51AD30 Combinations of antiseptics

=== QG51AG Antiinfectives and/or antiseptics, combinations for intrauterine use ===
QG51AG01 Procaine benzylpenicillin, dihydrostreptomycin and sulfadimidine
QG51AG02 Benzylpenicillin, dihydrostreptomycin and sulfadimidine
QG51AG03 Tetracycline, neomycin and sulfadimidine
QG51AG04 Ampicillin and oxacillin
QG51AG05 Ampicillin and cloxacillin
QG51AG06 Oxytetracycline and neomycin
QG51AG07 Ampicillin and colistin
