= Becaplermin =

Pharmaceutical drug

Clinical data
- Trade names: Regranex
- AHFS/Drugs.com: Consumer Drug Information
- MedlinePlus: a699049
- Routes of administration: Topical
- ATC code: A01AD08 (WHO) , D03AX06 (WHO)

Legal status
- Legal status: US: ℞-only

Identifiers
- CAS Number: 165101-51-9
- DrugBank: DB00102
- ChemSpider: none
- UNII: 1B56C968OA
- ChEMBL: ChEMBL1201556
- CompTox Dashboard (EPA): DTXSID70858772

Becaplermin, sold under the brand name Regranex, is a cicatrizant, available as a topical gel. Regranex is a human platelet-derived growth factor indicated along with good wound care for the treatment of lower extremity diabetic neuropathic ulcers. It is also known as "platelet-derived growth factor BB".

== Medical uses ==
Becaplermin is used for the treatment of diabetic foot ulcers. Studies of becaplermin showed that when used with good wound care, complete healing significantly increased and the ulcers healed on average 6 weeks faster. Pharmacoeconomic studies reinforce the cost effectiveness of becaplermin as an adjunct to good wound care.

The amount of becaplermin to be applied will vary depending upon the size of the ulcer area. Becaplermin should be stored in the refrigerator. Analysis of healing human wounds showed that PDGF-BB induces fibroblast proliferation and differentiation and was found to increase healing in patients with decreased healing capacity, such as people living with diabetes.

== Contraindications ==
Becaplermin must not be used at the site of a skin cancer.

== Adverse effects ==
The most common side effects in clinical studies were erythematous rashes.
