= Tetrachlorodecaoxide =

Chemical compound

Clinical data
- ATC code: D03AX11 (WHO)

Identifiers
- IUPAC name: Molecular oxygen tetrachlorite hydrate
- CAS Number: 92047-76-2
- PubChem CID: 3000391
- UNII: 549BT7IE1Q
- CompTox Dashboard (EPA): DTXSID40238840
- ECHA InfoCard: 100.101.959

"Tetrachlorodecaoxide" (TCDO) is a chlorite-containing substance with claimed immunomodulatory, macrophage-activating properties. WF10 (Macrokine, Immunokine, Oxoferin) is an aqueous solution of tetrachlorodecaoxide designed for intravenous injection. Tetrachlorodecaoxide/WF10 were originally developed by Oxo Chemie. The chemical formula is given as Cl_{4}H_{2}O_{11}^{4-}. This incomplete formula shows a mixture of chlorite ion, water, and molecular oxygen: "Cl_{4}H_{2}O_{11}^{4-}" = 4ClO_{2}^{−} + H_{2}O + O_{2}. Oxoferin was found to be equivalent with aqueous sodium chlorite.

Tetrachlorodecaoxide / WF10 is used in the management of radiation cystitis, is effective in the treatment of diabetic foot ulcers, and is used in wound healing, where the mechanism of action is activation of the macrophage system, and increasing the partial pressure of oxygen in the wound.
