= Policresulen =

Chemical compound

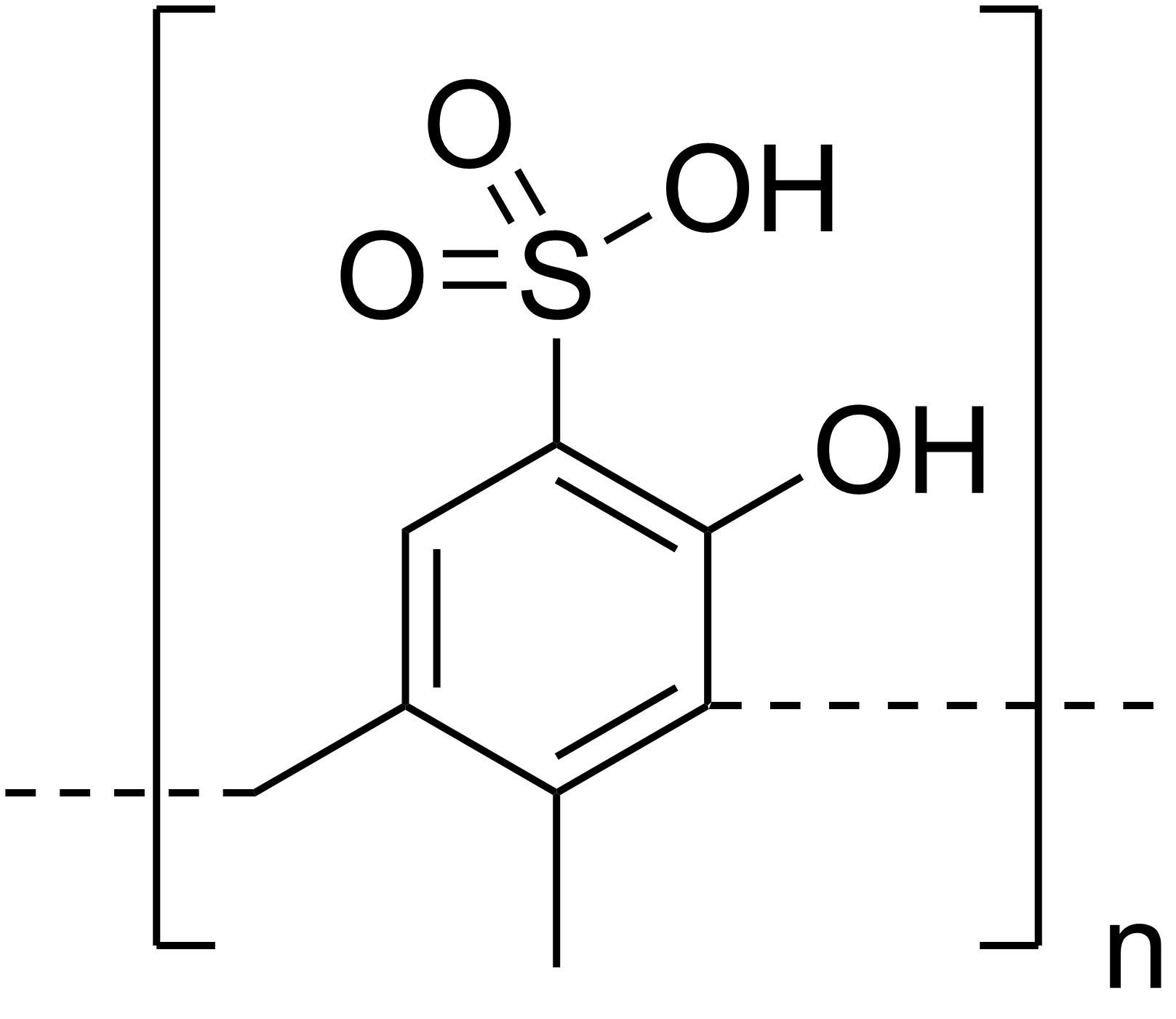

Clinical data
- AHFS/Drugs.com: International Drug Names
- Routes of administration: topical
- ATC code: D08AE02 (WHO) G01AX03 (WHO) QG51AD02 (WHO)

Identifiers
- CAS Number: 101418-00-2
- PubChem CID: 3050404
- ChemSpider: none
- UNII: 6I19M5GB0G
- CompTox Dashboard (EPA): DTXSID70143913

Chemical and physical data
- Formula: (C_{9}H_{8}O_{4}S)_{n}
- Molar mass: variable

Policresulen is the polycondensation product of meta-cresolsulfonic acid and phenol. It is used as a topical hemostatic and antiseptic in infectious and other lesions of the mucous membranes, like gynecological infections, anal hemorrhoids as well as ulcers of the oral cavity including canker sores. In some countries it is marketed under the trade name Albothyl or Polilen (Taiwan) or Faktu (combination with Cinchocaine).

== Medical uses ==
Policresulen is used in the treatment of gynecological infections since the 1950s. The range of applications soon widened to include the therapy of other mucous membrane and skin lesions. The mechanism of action is twofold: next to its antiseptic effect, policresulen promotes the selective coagulation of necrotic and pathologically altered tissues while leaving healthy tissues intact. The shedding of necrotic tissues is accompanied by the reepithelialization of the mucosal (or dermal) wound tissues.
