= Charles Delacommune =

French inventor and film producer

Charles Eugène Delacommune
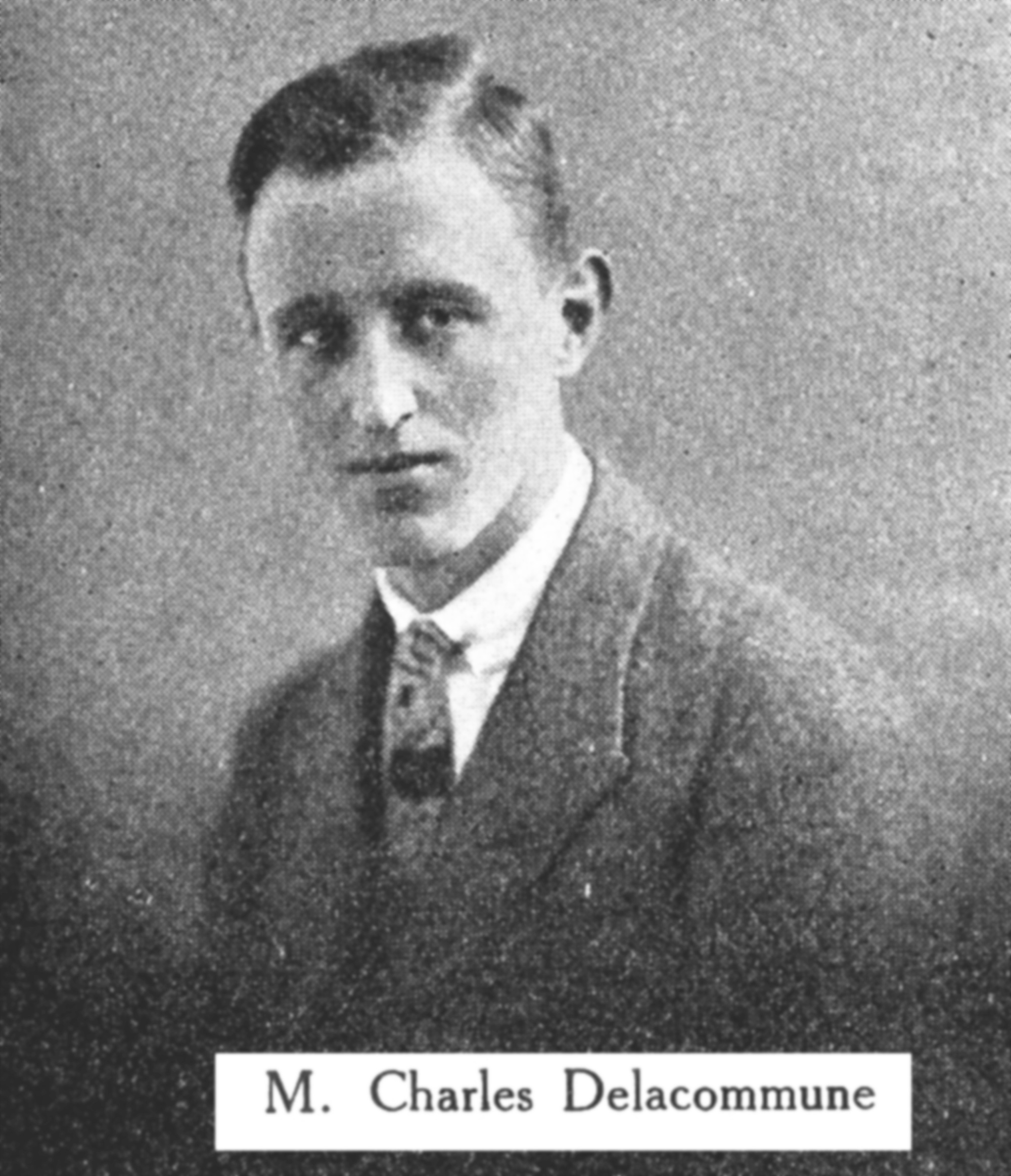
- Charles Delacommune
- Born: 26 February 1895; París, France
- Died: 14 September 1950 (aged 55); París, France
- Scientific career
- Fields: Technology

Charles Eugène Edouard Delacommune (Paris, 26 February 1895 – Paris, 14 September 1950) was a French inventor and film producer known by his Synchro-Ciné machine of 1921, a pioneer technical dispositive for audiovisual synchronization, by mechanical procedures and still with the performers playing the music in live, in the same room of the cinema . In addition to continuing his inventive work with other devices, he established the film production company Synchro-ciné, producing documentaries using his machinery. Later, this company performed and distributed other kinds of films.

== Early life ==
Pertaining to a family always related to the techniques and the plumbing to a large scale, dedicated to the supply of the army, Charles Delacommune was raised practically in the workshop of machinery (that was in his own house), and from childhood participated in the tests and trials on technical advances. Was also, among other things, doctor in agronomy at the age of 18, war hero, aviator, military writer, painter and art dealer.

== Career ==
=== Early inventor ===
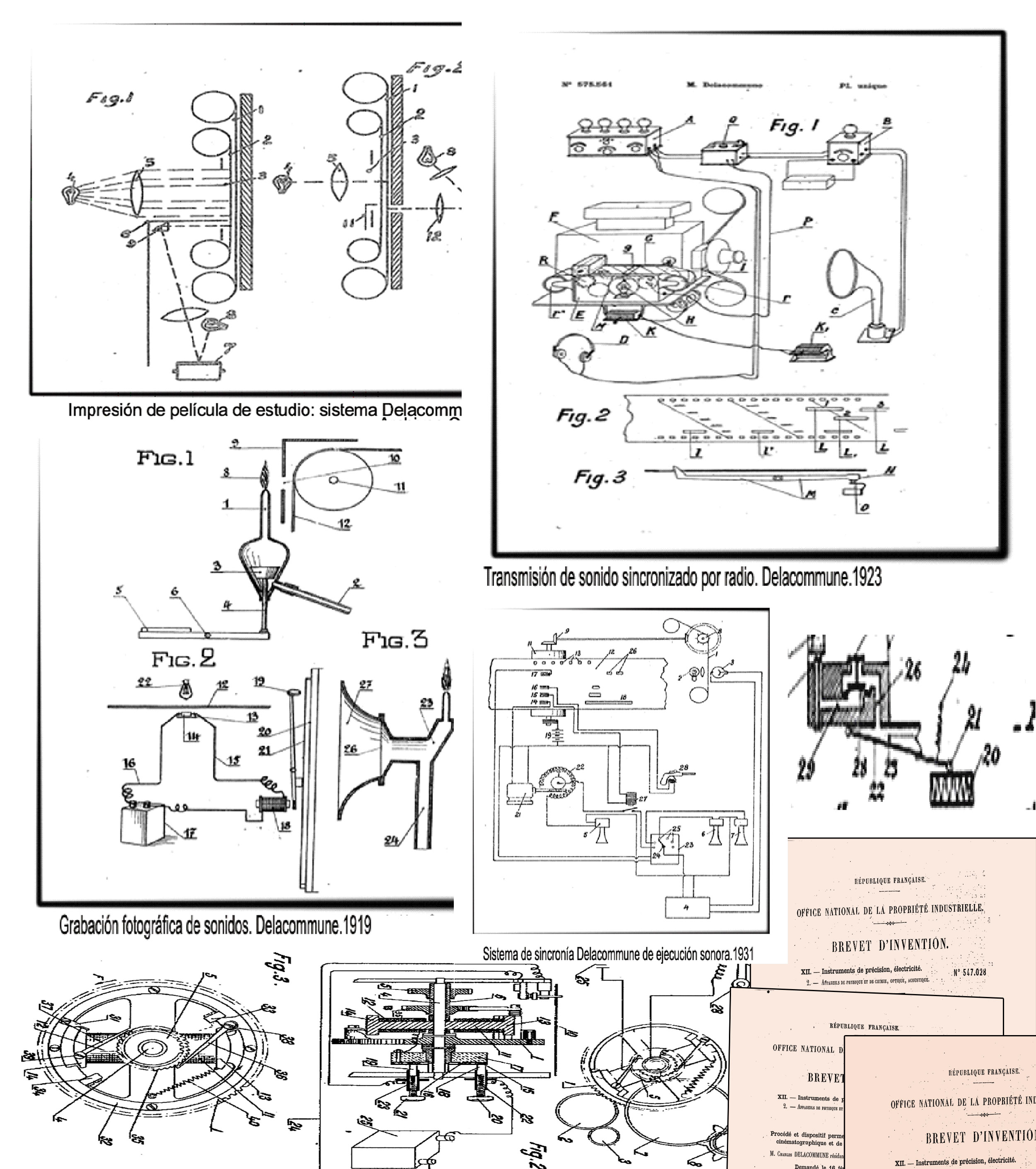
Others devices of Charles Delacommune

Relevant figure in the inventive aspect as were many the inventions that realized in a short space of time and with precarious means: among others, a first attempt of recording of sound in celluloide already in 1919 by means of gas flames; or the method and device for the synchronization of a cinematographic projection with a wireless telephony audition in order to synchronize live interpreters with other sounds emitted by radio from a transmitter, simultaneously in the various rooms connected to system; of 1923.

There is also an aircraft-viewfinder (designed on the war front) that has been lost; and an apparatus for making various noises (ciné-bruiteur), whose design is immersed in one of the complex modernizations of its system (with multiple individual patents on each application).

=== Synchro-Ciné ===
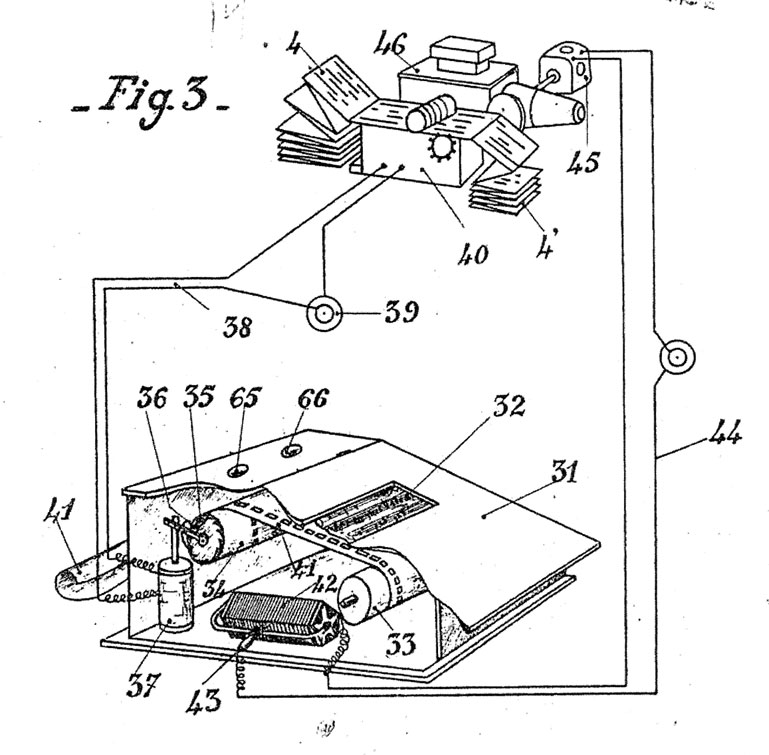
The Synchro-Ciné of Charles Delacommune, invented in 1921

Defined by him as a procedure and device for the realization of the so-called cinematic synchronism , his procedure and "desk of synchronization", widely used for conferences in schools (for what was originally designed), was also used with notable success to direct a symphonic orchestra (reading the conductor from the desk) or soloists in a synchronized way with the films. L'Inhumaine or Pacific 231 were some of those that were played, live, with his device. The Ballet mécanique, which was attempted to synchronize with (it as it appears in the contracts), could not possibly be made, possibly due to the difficulty of Antheil's music, but the company Synchro-Ciné remained as its official distributor for several years and even today most of its copies have their logo in the entrance and exit.

Throughout the decade (1920–30) he was developing the various elements of his Delacommune procedure always perfecting them, realizing continuous patents of the various components, materials and methods to be used. In the case of greater expansion and potentiality of the system could control from nine to twelve different devices, but in a very unstable and simple way. With the advent of sound cinema, his live performance technique ended up making a great contribution to the later techniques of dubbing, since his procedure and device (especially the element called Kinematic band ) are an immediate precedent of the so-called rhythmographic paper-band, basic tool of those works until recently, and its subsequent substitution by digital systems.

On the other hand, in a broad sense, its system could be considered a distant precedent of both: of audiovisual mixing tables (including a special table of audio-video mix for the composer's and director or fitter) work, as well as of the MIDI control systems, being able to fire various elements from a data sequence recorded on a sliding band of perforated paper, a medium term between the pianola's rolls of the previous decade, and the perforated paper-bands of the first computers that would arrive years later.

=== Later career ===
He was, on the other hand, very controversial and reprehensible in the political aspect at the end of his career. In 1935 his company is ruined and a national campaign is undertaken to save him from eviction. Soon after, he begins to approach the Vichy regime, with which ends up collaborating like executive of its new official cinematographic organizations . It seems that, at this time, he subscribe documentaries of racist tones, although we have not any concrete evidence.

The end of the World War II brings the disappearance of its devices and the disappearance of the person, given by eliminated ("purified") with the arrival of the troops of liberation. And, perhaps justifiably, his fall into total oblivion. However, the reality is that he was saved, hid in Montmartre where he became a dealer and cultural animator; and died, in the end, in the same Paris, always maintaining an almost absolute incognito.
