= Cefquinome =

Chemical compound

Clinical data
- ATCvet code: QG51AA07 (WHO) QJ01DE90 (WHO) QJ51DE90 (WHO)

Legal status
- Legal status: US: Unscheduled Rx-only

Pharmacokinetic data
- Bioavailability: 87%
- Protein binding: <5%
- Elimination half-life: 2½ hours
- Excretion: Renal, unchanged

Identifiers
- IUPAC name: 1-[[(6R,7R)-7-[[(2Z)-(2-Amino-4-thiazolyl)-(methoxyimino)acetyl]amino]-2-carboxy-8-oxo-5-thia-1-azabicyclo[4.2.0-oct-2-en-3-yl]methyl]-5,6,7,8-tetrahydroquinolinium inner salt
- CAS Number: 84957-30-2
- ChemSpider: 16736863
- UNII: Z74S078CWP
- KEGG: D07652
- ChEMBL: ChEMBL2103931
- CompTox Dashboard (EPA): DTXSID00894103
- ECHA InfoCard: 100.217.154

Chemical and physical data
- Formula: C_{23}H_{24}N_{6}O_{5}S_{2}
- Molar mass: 528.60 g·mol^{−1}
- 3D model (JSmol): Interactive image
- SMILES: O=C4[C@@H](NC(=O)C(=N\OC)/c1csc(N)n1)[C@H]5SC\C(C[n+]3cccc2CCCCc23)=C(/N45)C([O-])=O
- InChI: InChI=1S/C23H24N6O5S2/c1-34-27-16(14-11-36-23(24)25-14)19(30)26-17-20(31)29-18(22(32)33)13(10-35-21(17)29)9-28-8-4-6-12-5-2-3-7-15(12)28/h4,6,8,11,17,21H,2-3,5,7,9-10H2,1H3,(H3-,24,25,26,30,32,33)/b27-16-/t17-,21-/m1/s1; Key:YWKJNRNSJKEFMK-PQFQYKRASA-N

Cefquinome is a fourth-generation cephalosporin with pharmacological and antibacterial properties valuable in the treatment of coliform mastitis and other infections. It is only used in veterinary applications.

== Properties ==
Cefquinome is resistant to beta-lactamase. Chemically, its zwitterionic structure can facilitate rapid penetration across biological membranes, including porins of bacterial cell walls. Plus, it has a higher affinity to target penicillin-binding proteins. The reactive site is a beta-lactam nucleus, while the main peripheral functional groups are a quaternary quinolinium, an aminothiazolyl moiety and an unusual O-alkylated oxime.

Cefquinome acts by inhibition of the cell wall synthesis, but it has a relatively short half-life of about 2.5 hours. It is less than 5% protein bound and is excreted unchanged in the urine.

== Intervet ==
Intervet developed cefquinome (Cobactan) to treat bovine respiratory disease, the most common disease in cattle. An injection, containing 25 mg cefquinome per ml, is given to cattle and pigs.

=== Treatment ===
In cattle, the injection should help against respiratory disease caused by Mannheimia haemolytica and Pasteurella multocida. It also helps with acute E. coli mastitis, dermatitis, infectious bulbar necrosis, and interdigital necrobacillosis. In calves, it is effective against E. coli septicaemia.

For pigs, it is used to treat bacterial infections of the lungs and respiratory tract caused by P. multocida, Haemophilus parasuis, Actinobacillus pleuropneumoniae, and Streptococcus suis. Mastitis-metritis-agalactia syndrome involved with E. coli, Staphylococcus, Streptococcus, and other cefquinome-sensitive organisms are also treated. In piglets, the mortality rate in cases of meningitis caused by Streptococcus suis is reduced. It is used in the treatment of mild or moderate lesions caused by Staphylococcus hyicus and arthritis caused by Streptococcus spp. and E. coli.

== Clinical usage ==
=== Human use ===
Cefquinome is not approved for human use.

=== Veterinary medicine ===
Conditions of use are limited to therapeutic, parenteral, and individual animal use. Individual parenteral therapy of bovine respiratory disease data on cefquinome-related residues demonstrate only very small amounts are present in the intestinal tract of treated cattle with gastrointestinal activation. However, treatment should be short, meaning a single injection daily for about a week. Treatment should only be given by prescription. Cefquinome should not be used in feed or water.

Since 1994, in Europe, it was allowed to treat cattle by prescription only. In 1999, swine were included. By 2005, horses were allowed as well. In the United States, approval is pending for treatment of bovine respiratory disease. Even so, this is only available by prescription.

Cefquinome is also used for other illnesses, such as “shipping fever”, a pneumonia-like illness commonly found in cattle.

== Concerns ==
=== Resistance and food-borne transmission ===
Of concern, the use of the drug in animals may lead to increases in antibiotic resistance. Humans can be exposed to bacteria through food-borne transmission, raising chances of becoming exposed to resistant bacterial species, such as Salmonella or E. coli. The potential for the development of antibiotic resistance increases as usage increases, by selecting bacteria which have acquired beta-lactamases.

=== Salmonella ===
The use may cause resistance in Salmonella present in the intestinal tract of the target animal. Resistant Salmonella may also contaminate the carcass at slaughter and transfer to humans when used as food. When humans are infected and treated with a fourth-generation cephalosporin, effectiveness may be compromised.

Although fourth-generation cephalosporin resistance is very rare, they are active against bacteria carrying the AmpC-type β-lactamase resistance mechanism. Since the late 1990s, the US and EU have surveyed and gathered data for fourth-generation cephalosporins for both human and veterinary use. Data indicate no changes occur in resistance patterns of relevant food-borne pathogens.

== FDA guidelines ==
- Administered products will be used in individual animals for short duration and by prescription only.
- The extent of use is ranked low.
- Avoid human drug resistance to fourth-generation cephalosporins by authorizing extra-label prohibition.

== Synthesis ==
Broad-spectrum fourth generation injectable aminothiazolyl cephalosporin.

Cefquinome synthesis:

Cefotaxime (1) is a potent cephalosporin antibiotic in its own right. Further modification of this drug by inclusion of a quaternary ammonium cation gives a compound suitable for parenteral administration by increasing water solubility. The acid in cefotaxime is first protected as its silyl ester (2) by derivatization with N-methyl-N-(trimethylsilyl)trifluoroacetamide (MSTFA). Treatment of this intermediate with trimethylsilyl iodide gives the allylic iodide (3). Displacement of halogen with 5,6,7,8-tetrahydroquinoline (2,3-cyclohexenopyridine) gives the corresponding quaternary salt. Hydrolysis of the silyl ester followed by adjustments of the pH leads to the betaine cefquinome (4).

== See also ==
- Campylobacter
- Cefepime
- Cephalosporin
- Enterococcus
- Zwitterion
