= Crilanomer =

Chemical compound

Clinical data
- ATC code: D03AX09 (WHO)

Identifiers
- CAS Number: 552881-25-1
- ChemSpider: none

Crilanomer is a cicatrizant.
