= Synchro-Ciné =

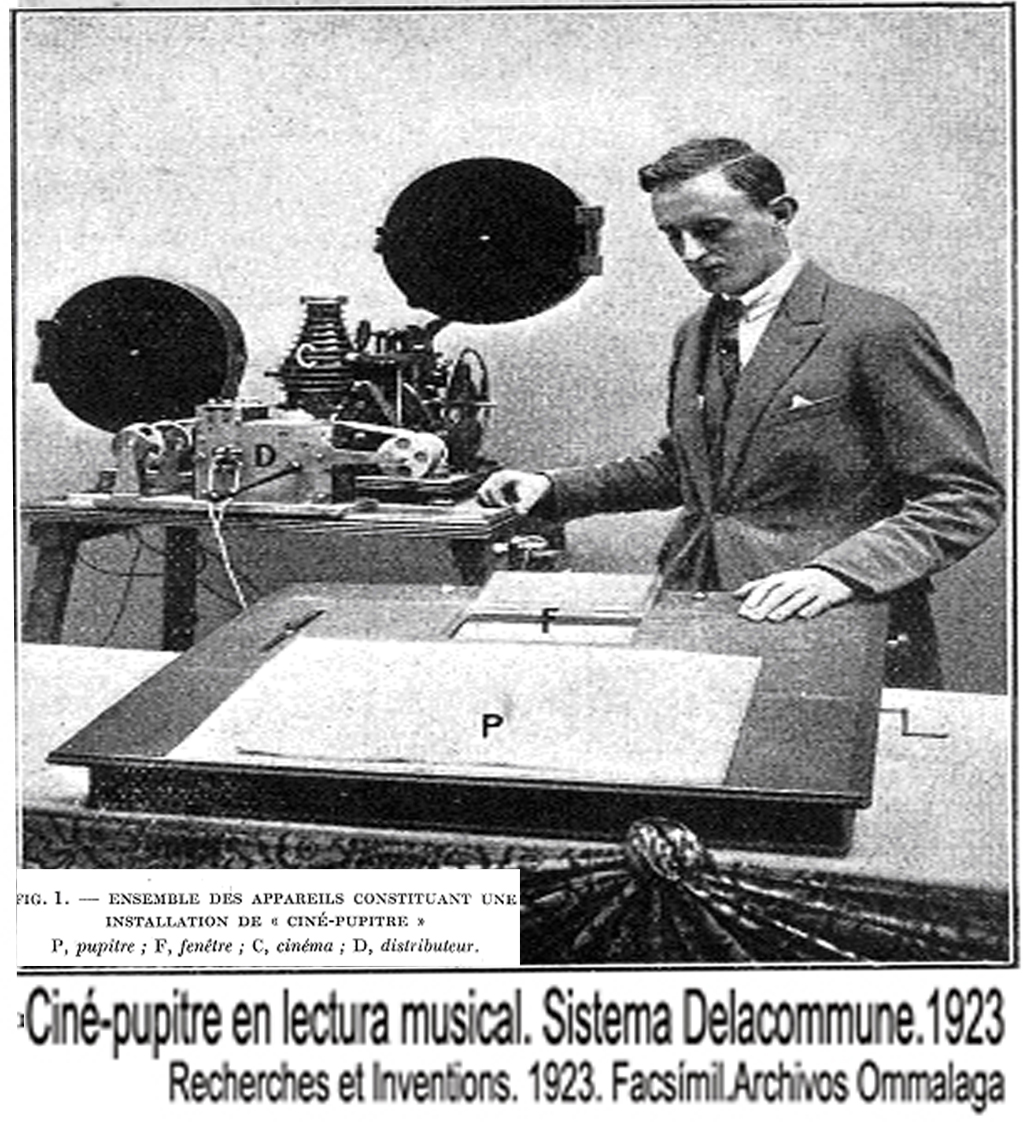
Synchro-Ciné device and Charles Delacommune, the inventor

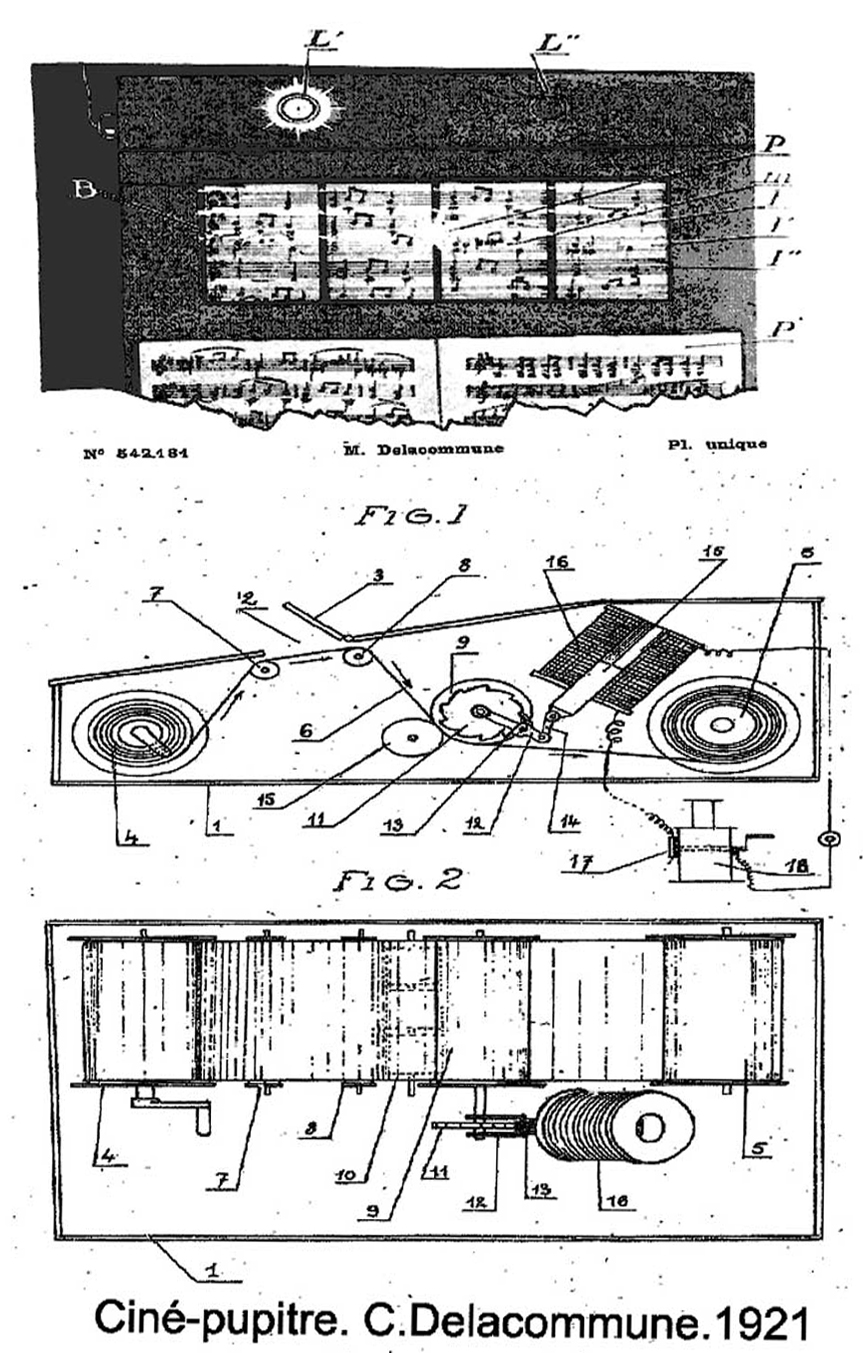
Delacommune reading desk and its visual result

The Synchro-Ciné was a device, invented by the French inventor Charles Delacommune in 1921, pioneer in the objective of synchronizing the projection of a film with the corresponding sounds. The sounds to be synchronized could be from the words of a narrator, the reading of a score by an orchestra conductor (or by a musician soloist), or shooting up devices with noises-effects;. But always by mechanical procedures, and with live sound by interpreters in the room (it was still a decade away for sound cinema). By assimilation, it was also known as Ciné-pupitre, its most popular and well-known device in many countries.

But in reality, under the same name are called, over time, three different things:

A) Firstly, the original synchronized reading desk, from 1921, the so-called ciné-pupitre, an isolated device for reading texts or music, for a single user (although this may be a soloist or an orchestra conductor who, since reading it, controls the complete template of instrumentalists) adjusted by an engine in synchronization with the projected images of the films.

B) Soon after, in 1922-23, the synchro-ciné, expanding the connection possibilities of its central distributor, already became a complete synchronization system, in which the reading desk is only one of the many elements around the central element, the control band, circulating in the distributor gear, and which can automatically trigger various 'noise' devices (Ciné-bruiteurs) or 'noise-makers' (some designed by Delacommune himself and incorporated into the system in the patent), shoot piano players, gramophones, and various desks that are needed, up to a maximum of, it seems, 9 devices. The proof of the change of orientation in the machinery and final objectives is the fact that, although the reading desks remain a regular part of the system; however it is already perfectly possible to perform a performance without using at all (only with the capacity of the central distributor, and the connected noises devices). Also part of the system are the various procedures and methods that are registered to improve and facilitate the use of your procedure, throughout over time. It is called in the original patent the "Synchronismes Cinématographiques" system, although it was usually abbreviated as "Synchro-ciné" system, or even more usual "Delacommune system".

c) And finally, it gave name to the production and distribution company of the films realized with this device (and directed by the own Delacommune). Among others, "ElDorado", by L'Herbier; the "Danse Macabre" by Dudley Murphy or the Ballet mécanique, by Léger. With a career based on documentaries, this production company had a moment of boom at the beginning of sound cinema. as this procedure and device proved to be very suitable for the synchronization of voices in dubbing (the so-called 'band rhythm'), and used until very recently by the professionals of said specialty. However, Delacommune (and his company) it ended up falling into ruin and had to be subject to a special campaign of help by his fellow inventors for their mere subsistence.

== The first audiovisual mixer ==
The original 1921 device, the ciné-pupitre, consisted of a reading desk supplied with an aperture at which a paper text "that unfolded before the reader, by small shakes, on which was inscribed the oral accompaniment of the film. Each line corresponded to the projection time of a number of determined frames and was in the center of the reference during the projection of these frames. In other words, the fixed reference allowed the reader to know in each instant the phrase of the text to say corresponding to the projection or the appropriate musical fragment for the conductor or soloist", say Delacommune himself in his patent.

Once the paper-band was prepared, the various mismatches common to the time from multiple causes (lack of electrical current, mechanical problems, etc.) could be solved, on the fly, in two ways. Or the speed of the control band was set at the desk (or the distributor) or by a mechanism that the orchestra conductor was placed in the hand (a rheostat), slightly vary the speed of the images.

But this system also had the potential to work in another way: firing directly from its paper-band orders to the various notes of a pianola, or shooting up effects and devices of noises or records previously prepared for this purpose. It is this potentiality of automatic adjustment (once the control-band is properly recorded) that makes it a mechanical precedent to the current audiovisual mixes tables, and, perhaps, of the MIDI systems (the digital control of musical instruments).

It was not the only device of the so-called synchronization desks or synchronized reading of the time, an advance that the film industry of the moment was looking forward to, as it offered movies with live music, including large symphony orchestras in the first class halls (Cinema-Palaces) or Theater-Cinemas.

Delacommune himself says in the magazines of the time: "One immediately understands the interest of such an apparatus. Of a little expensive manufacture, with a safe operation, its use is very indicated in all the places where the words must accompany a projection. One can foresee the happy consequences in teaching, in filmed lectures, in innovations (theater-filmed, novel-movies spoken, et cetera).

Shortly after, the German industry counted with the Musikchronometer, of Carl Blum for the same thing, an analog device although with different mechanism, and which was used with satisfaction by the participants (among them, Hindemith) in the Darmstad Music encounters since 1927.
