= Tulle gras =

Bandage infused with oils

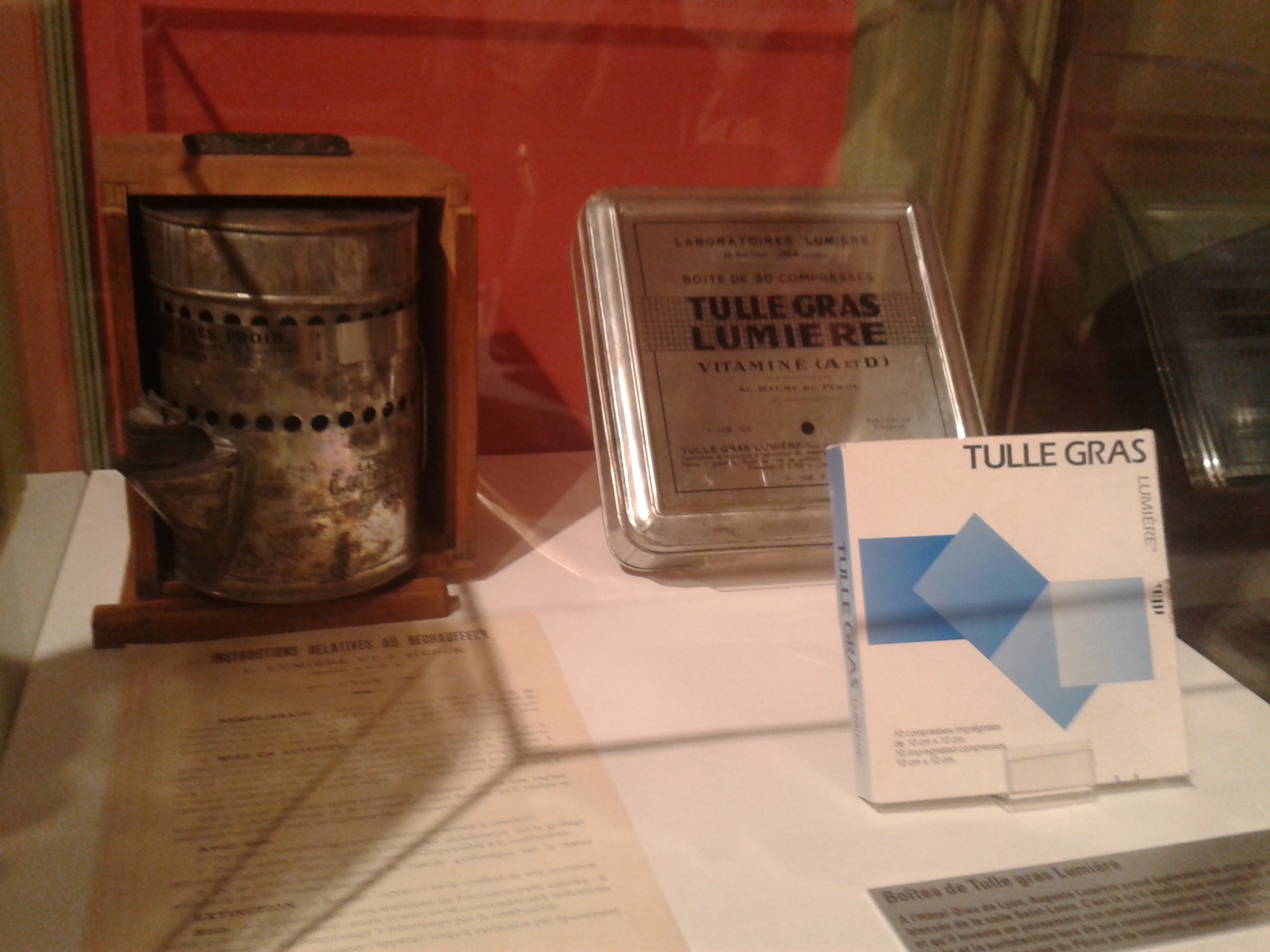
A museum display of Tulle Gras Lumière, invented by Auguste Lumière, in Lyon

Tulle gras (French, "oily tulle") or tulle gras dressing is a type of bandage commonly used in France, although the term is also used in English. It consists of fabric impregnated with soft paraffin oil (98 parts), balsam of Peru (1 part), and olive oil (1 part), which prevents its sticking to wounds, but means that it needs to be used in combination with another absorbent dressing.

It is used to make inadine.
