= Cefapirin =

Chemical compound

Clinical data
- AHFS/Drugs.com: International Drug Names
- MedlinePlus: a601206
- Routes of administration: Intravenous, intramuscular
- ATC code: J01DB08 (WHO) QG51AA05 (WHO) QJ51DB08 (WHO)

Legal status
- Legal status: US: ℞-only

Identifiers
- CAS Number: 21593-23-7
- PubChem CID: 30699
- DrugBank: DB01139
- ChemSpider: 28486
- UNII: 89B59H32VN
- KEGG: D07636
- ChEBI: CHEBI:554446
- ChEMBL: ChEMBL1599
- CompTox Dashboard (EPA): DTXSID9022784
- ECHA InfoCard: 100.040.409

Chemical and physical data
- Formula: C_{17}H_{17}N_{3}O_{6}S_{2}
- Molar mass: 423.46 g·mol^{−1}
- 3D model (JSmol): Interactive image
- SMILES: O=C2N1/C(=C(\CS[C@@H]1[C@@H]2NC(=O)CSc3ccncc3)COC(=O)C)C(=O)O
- InChI: InChI=1S/C17H17N3O6S2/c1-9(21)26-6-10-7-28-16-13(15(23)20(16)14(10)17(24)25)19-12(22)8-27-11-2-4-18-5-3-11/h2-5,13,16H,6-8H2,1H3,(H,19,22)(H,24,25)/t13-,16-/m1/s1; Key:UQLLWWBDSUHNEB-CZUORRHYSA-N

Cefapirin (INN, also spelled cephapirin) is an injectable, first-generation cephalosporin antibiotic. It was marketed in the United States for human use under the trade name Cefadyl, but has since been discontinued in all forms for human use.

== Veterinary Use ==
Although it is no longer used in Humans, Cefapirin remains an important veterinary medication. For cattle, it is sold as ToDAY and ToMORROW by Merial, the prior as a treatment for mammary inflammation, the latter for accute mastitis.

== Synthesis ==
Cephapirin synthesis: U.S. patent 3,422,100 U.S. patent 3,503,967 U.S. patent 3,578,661

In one of the syntheses, 7-aminocephalosporanic acid (7-ACA) is reacted with bromoacetyl chloride to give the amide. The halo group is then displaced by 4-thiopyridine.
