= Antheil =

Antheil is a surname. Notable people with the surname include:

- George Antheil (1900–1959), American composer, pianist, author, and inventor
- Henry W. Antheil Jr. (1912–1940), American diplomat
