= Triple dye =

Triple dye is an antiseptic initially used for the treatment of burn victims during the Second World War. It later came into use in general medicine. A commercial implementation was as a constituent of "over-the-counter" antiseptic soaps and handwashes.

== Compound ==
The active ingredients of the compound, with typical percentages by weight, are:

- brilliant green 0.77%
- proflavine 0.58%
- gentian violet 1.17%

in aqueous solution.

== History ==
The preparation was initially used for the treatment of burn victims during the Second World War. Application was as a 50% mixture with soft soap solution. Later, it was adopted in dentistry for the treatment of severe gum disease. Commercially, it came into use as an ingredient of "over-the-counter" antiseptic handwashes and medicated soap. Today, it remains in widespread use in midwifery, for application to the umbilicus of newborn infants.

In September 2016 the Food and Drug Administration of the United States, while not restricting the product's applications in medicine, ruled that the available data regarding uptake and retention of triple dye in the bodies of long-term users were insufficient to show that it could be "Generally recognized as safe and effective" and its sale as a consumer product was terminated.
