= Inadine =

Surgical dressing

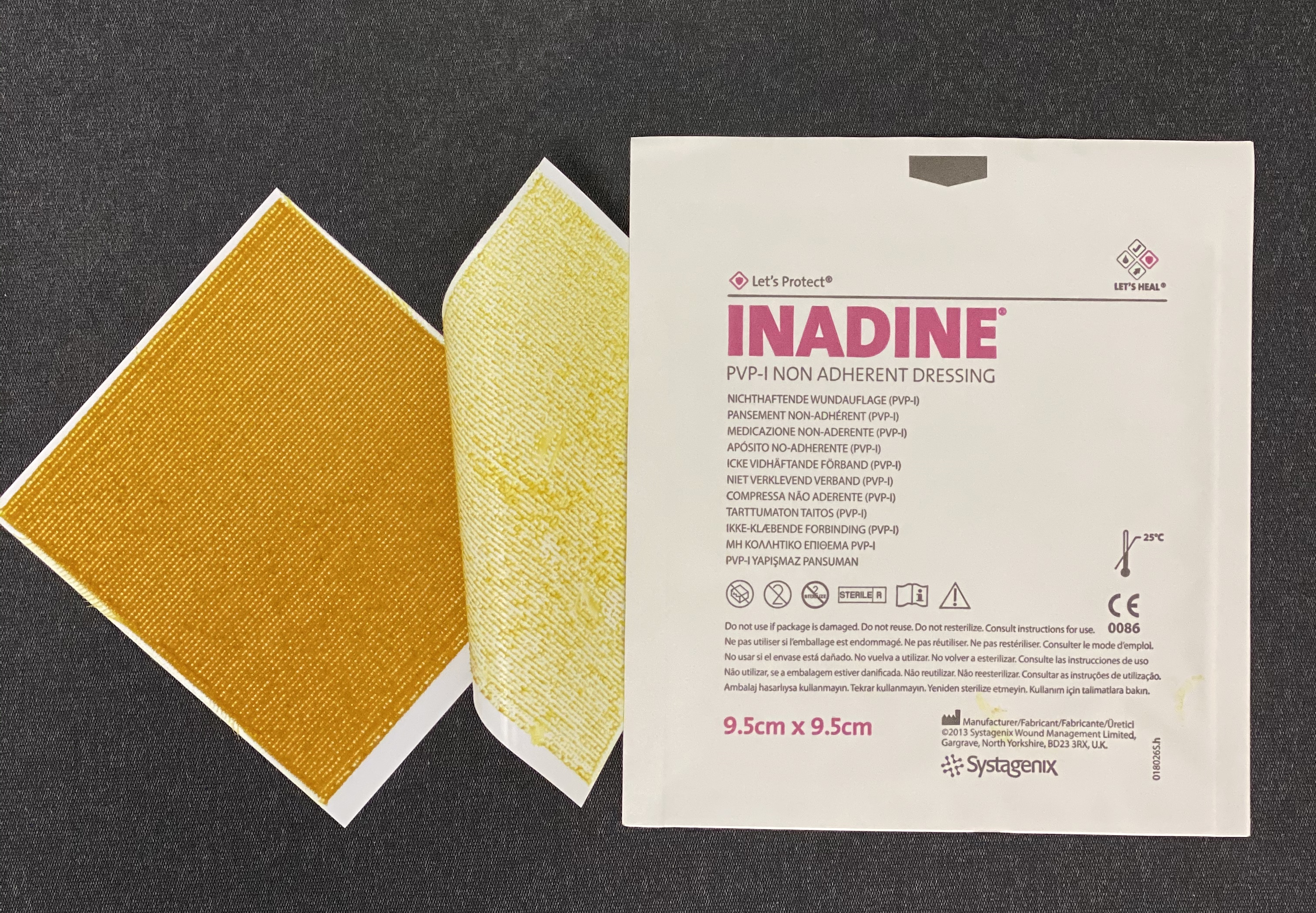
- Product type: dressing

Inadine is an iodine-containing non-sticky surgical dressing consisting of a knitted viscose fabric with a polyethylene glycol base that contains and slowly releases the antiseptic povidone-iodine (PVP-1). It is applied to superficial wounds.

It is a widely available dressing produced by Systagenix.

== Structure and function ==
Inadine is an iodine-containing non-sticky surgical dressing consisting of a knitted viscose fabric with a polyethylene glycol base that contains and slowly releases the antiseptic povidone-iodine (PVP-1). It is a topical wound dressing and is considered suitable for superficial wounds. The rate of release of iodine is dependent on the amount of moisture from the wound.

The dressing is thin, and comes sandwiched between backing papers, from which it is peeled. Once applied directly to a recently cleaned wound it has the ability to absorb some moisture or blood from the wound. As the iodine is used up, the dressing loses colour and becomes white.

It is typically held in place using gauze and then bandage material. The polyethylene glycol provides a moist environment allowing the iodine to reach the wound.

After a few days the dressing has a tendency to dry out, and must be changed often. Left on too long, it can engage with wound tissue and wound secretions when drier, and be more difficult to remove. This tendency to adhere to wounds is usually resolved by soaking the wound for a few minutes with normal saline.

Inadine is inexpensive, well tolerated and is a widely available dressing produced by Systagenix.

== History ==
Iodine was first suggested as a dressing by John Davies in 1839 and had been evaluated by Robert Koch and Louis Pasteur. E. Vallin had proposed the antimicrobial property of iodine in 1882. Until at least the 1950s, it was usual to see tinctures of iodine as an essential component of the medicine cabinet. Local pain, irritation and orange-brown staining of the skin, however, limited its use. Later formulations were developed which were less painful and their use has become widespread. With the exception of the United States, Inadine has been available in several countries since the 1980s. It was previously made by Johnson & Johnson.
