= Clostripain =

Enzyme

Identifiers
- EC no.: 3.4.22.8
- CAS no.: 9028-00-6

Databases
- BRENDA: enzyme data
- ExPASy: NiceZyme view
- KEGG: enzyme entry
- MetaCyc: metabolic pathway
- Rhea: reactions
- PDB structures: RCSB PDB PDBe PDBsum
Search
- PMC: articles
- PubMed: articles
- NCBI: proteins

Clostripain (EC 3.4.22.8, clostridiopeptidase B, clostridium histolyticum proteinase B, alpha-clostridipain, clostridiopeptidase, Endoproteinase Arg-C) is a cysteine protease that cleaves proteins on the carboxyl peptide bond of arginine. It was isolated from Clostridium histolyticum. The isoelectric point of the enzyme is 4.8-4.9 (at 8 °C), and optimum pH is 7.4~7.8 (against α-benzoyl-arginine ethyl ester). The composition of the enzyme is indicated to be of two chains of relative molecular mass 45,000 and 12,500.

== See also ==
- Benzoyl
- Ethyl ester
