= Bandage =

Material used to support a medical dressing or injured body part

Modern individually-packaged small gauze bandage. Thanks to its fine structure, it can be easily torn without the use of tools.

A bandage is a piece of material or a medical device used as support for a wound or injury, or to provide compression. Bandages used in healing protect the area from contamination and further trauma. Tight bandages can be used to slow blood flow to an extremity, such as when a leg or arm is bleeding heavily.

== Types ==
=== Gauze / Roller bandage ===
The most common type of bandage is the gauze bandage, a woven strip of material. A gauze bandage can come in any number of widths and lengths and can be used for almost any bandage application, including holding a dressing in place.

=== Compression bandage ===
Compression bandages, or elastic bandages, refers to a wide variety of bandages with many different applications such as with kinesio tape used in sports medicine.

- Short stretch compression bandages are applied to a limb (usually for treatment of lymphedema or venous ulcers). This type of bandage is capable of shortening around the limb after application and is therefore not exerting ever-increasing pressure during inactivity. This dynamic is called resting pressure and is considered safe and comfortable for long-term treatment. Conversely, the stability of the bandage creates a very high resistance to stretch when pressure is applied through internal muscle contraction and joint movement. This force is called working pressure.
- Long stretch compression bandages have long stretch properties, meaning that their high compressive power can be easily adjusted. However, they also have a very high resting pressure and must be removed at night or if the patient is in a resting position.

=== Triangular bandage ===
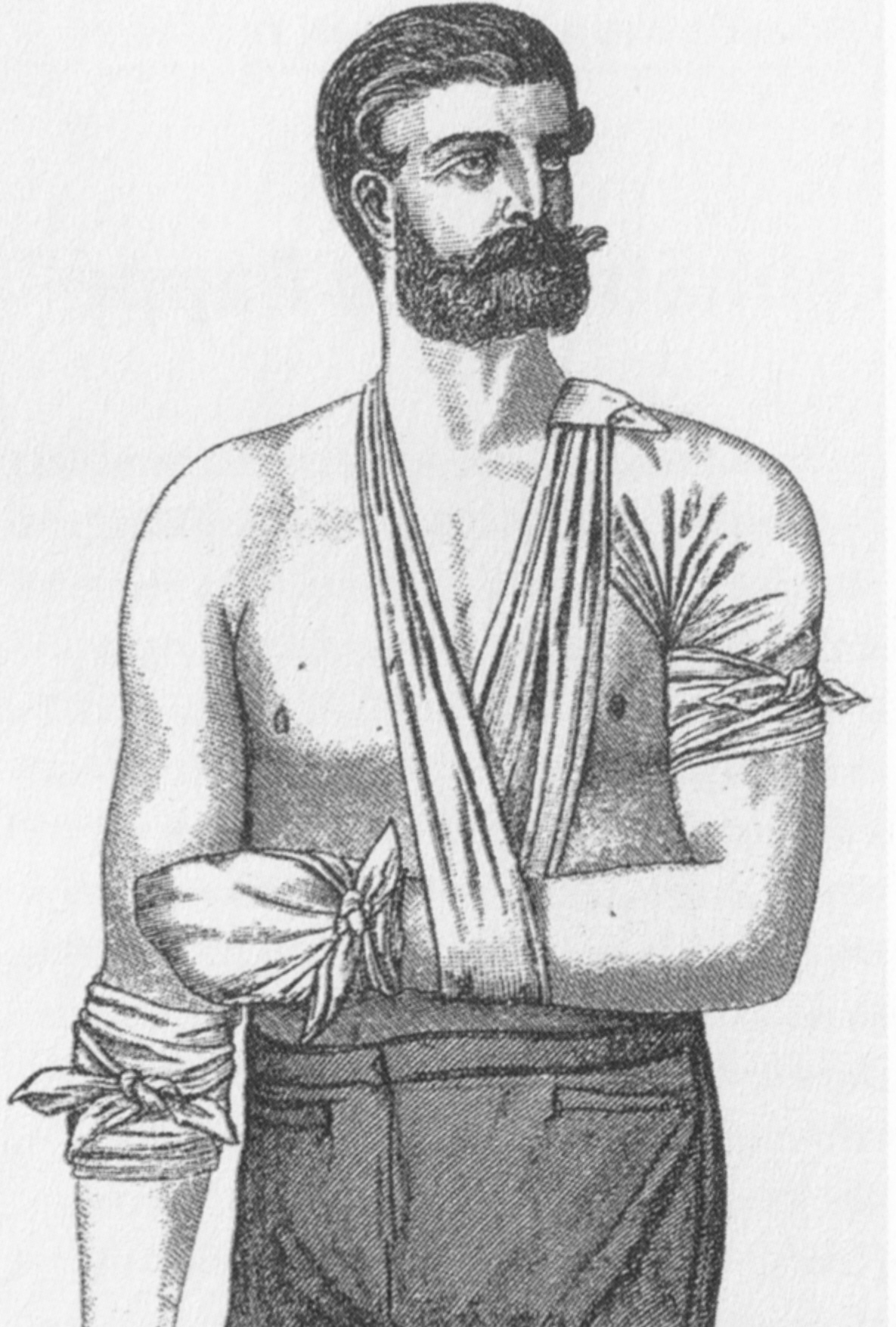
A man with a triangular bandage

Also known as a cravat bandage, a triangular bandage is a piece of cloth put into a right-angled triangle, and often provided with safety pins to secure it in place. It can be used fully unrolled as a sling, folded as a normal bandage, or for specialized applications, such as on the head. The Scouting movement popularized the use of this bandage in many of their first aid lessons, as a part of the uniform is a neckerchief which can easily be folded to form a cravat.

=== Kirigami bandage ===
A new type of bandage was invented in 2016; inspired by the art of kirigami, it uses parallel slits to better fit areas of the body that bend. The bandages have been produced with 3D-printed molds.

== See also ==
- Bandage scissors
- Tulle gras
- Compression stockings
- Field dressing (bandage)
- Dressing (medical)
