= Dantian =

Center of qi (vital energy) in traditional Chinese medicine

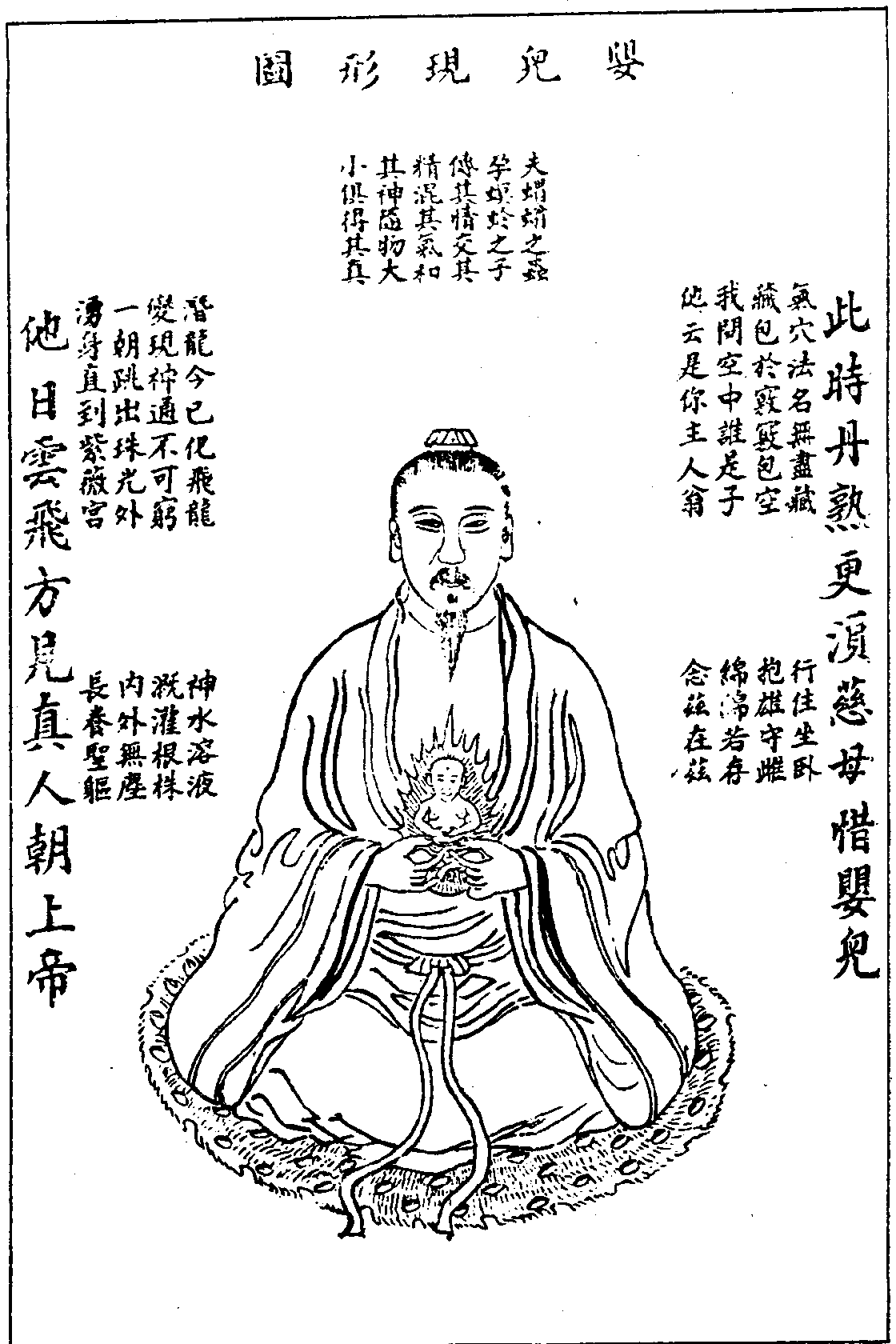
- 1615 illustration of the neidan meditation Ying'er xianxing (嬰兒現形, Generating the [Inner] Infant) in the Lower Dantian

Chinese name
- Chinese: 丹田
- Literal meaning: elixir-of-life field
Transcriptions
Standard Mandarin
- Hanyu Pinyin: dāntián
- Wade–Giles: tan t'ian

Vietnamese name
- Vietnamese: Đan điền
- Chữ Hán: 丹田

Thai name
- Thai: ตันเถียน
- RTGS: dantian

Korean name
- Hangul: 단전
- Hanja: 丹田
Transcriptions
- Revised Romanization: danjeon

Japanese name
- Kanji: 丹田
- Hiragana: たんでん
Transcriptions
- Revised Hepburn: tanden

Dantian in traditional Chinese medicine is a center of qi, the vital life force.

Three main dantian are typically emphasized: the lower dantian, situated at the lower belly, called hara in Japanese; the middle dantian, at the level of the heart; and the upper dantian, at the forehead between the eyebrows or third eye. Jing (essence) is purified into qi (vitality) in the lower dantian; qi is refined into shen or spirit in the middle dantian; and shen is transmuted into wu wei or emptiness in the upper dantian.

The dantian are important focal points in traditional Chinese medicine, for meditative and esoteric practices such as qigong, neidan, neigong, daoyin, Taoist sexual practices, and reiki and for martial arts such as tai chi.

== Etymology ==
Dantian (Ch. 丹田; Jap: tanden), literally "elixir field", is sometimes also referred to as "sea of qi" or "energy center."

The term dantian used by itself usually refers to the lower dantian. In Japanese, the word hara (腹; Chinese: fù), "abdomen," "belly," is often used interchangeably for the lower dantian (下丹田, Xià Dāntián). "Hara" should not be translated as "stomach," to avoid confusing it with the organ. An alternative Japanese reading of the character is Fuku, the Chinese reading is Fu.

== Three dantians and the elixir-of-life ==
Different schools of thought categorize dantian in various manners. Three main dantian are typically emphasized, which are focal points for transmutation of the three treasures, namely jing, qi and shen:

- Lower dantian (下丹田, Xià Dāntián): at the crossing of the horizontal line behind the Ren-6 acupoint and vertical line above the perineum, which is also called "the golden stove" (金炉 pinyin: Jīn lú) or the namesake "elixir-of-life field" proper, where the process of developing the elixir by refining and purifying essence (jing) into vitality (qi) begins.
- Middle dantian (中丹田, Zhōng Dāntián): at the level of the heart, which is also called "the crimson palace", associated with storing spirit (shen) and with respiration and health of the internal organs, in particular the thymus gland. This cauldron is where vitality or qi is refined into shen or spirit.
- Upper dantian (上丹田, Shàng Dāntián): at the forehead between the eyebrows or third eye, which is also called "the muddy pellet", associated with the pineal gland. This cauldron is where shen or spirit is transmuted into wu wei or emptiness.

Qi can be seen as a substance when it is stored in the form of jing, this can be refined by heating in these cauldrons into more rarefied states such as qi which is insubstantial and further still into shen which is more like the Western concept of mind although it is more often translated as "spirit".

== The lower dantian or hara ==
In Chinese, Korean, and Japanese traditions, the lower dantian or hara is considered to be the physical center of gravity of the human body, and the seat of one's internal energy (qi). It is considered to be the foundation of rooted standing, grounding, breathing, and body awareness in Chinese and other martial arts including qigong. The lower dantian has been described to be "like the root of the tree of life."

The lower dantian is particularly important as the focal point of breathing technique as well as the centre of balance and gravity. Taoist and Buddhist teachers often instruct their students to centre the mind in the navel or lower dantian. This is believed to aid and influence the thoughts and emotions. Acting from the dantian is considered to be related to higher states of awareness including sanmei (三昧) or ding (定).

Historically the first detailed description of the lower Dantian is in the Laozi zhongjing from the 3rd century CE, which refers to the elixir-of-life field where "essence" and "spirit" are stored; it is related to regeneration and sexual energy, menstruation and semen.

A master of Japanese acupuncture, calligraphy, swordsmanship, tea ceremony, martial arts, among other arts, is held in the Japanese tradition to be "acting from the hara."

=== Lower dantian in Eastern body-mind therapies ===
The lower dantian in traditional Chinese Medicine is where the primordial essence, Jing (精), is stored. At the same time, the lower dantian is the place for Yuan qi (元氣), the Qi that has not yet been divided into Yin Qi or Yang Qi. This Qi is much less physical and could be seen as the elemental existence of atoms and electrons before there are molecules. In the Ancient Texts of the Book of the Yellow Emperor (Huangdi Neijing ), the lower Dan Tian is referred to as both the seat of Jing (精) and the source of Yuan qi (元氣). Both can also be used side by side as an apparent contradiction. The lower dantian is the basis of all life—of the body (Jing 精), of the mind (shen, 神), of the energy of life (qi, 氣), of self-preservation, of self-healing and the capacity of resilience and determination as it is the seat of the will, when deficiency due to prolonged overworking or excessive emotions the prominent emotion is classified as fear and the person becomes prone to fright or flight as understood through the western medical lense of the central nervous system, as Jing or essence is the foundation of life.

In eastern medicine the Hara is seen as an area that reflects the state of all the organs (physically palpable in the abdomen or not), their formative physical state, and their complex energetic functional relationships with each other. A number of Eastern therapies explicitly focus on the hara in their work, amongst them acupuncture, Anma, Ampuku, Shiatsu and QiGong.

Japanese physicians and medical therapists use abdominal or Hara diagnosis to determine the health, vitality and prognosis of the patient, particularly, but not exclusively, the state of the abdominal organs or tissues and the related energy fields.

In diagnosis and treatment, the hara is partitioned in areas, each of which is considered to represent one of the (ten, eleven or twelve) vital organs and their functional energy fields. The details of this basic model of Hara diagnosis may differ from school to school.

A number of body-mind therapies have been introduced to or developed in the West, which seem to be influenced by concepts directly or indirectly derived from or related to Eastern models of abdominal diagnosis and therapy, some using breathing techniques (Buteyko, Yoga), postural alignment and movement education like Postural Integration, Feldenkrais, Alexander Technique, Qigong and Yoga, or manual manipulation like Osteopathy, Shiatsu and massage. All aim to relax, strengthen and support in their function the internal organs and tissues in, above and below the Hara.

=== Hara in the martial arts ===
The hara or lower dantian is important in the Chinese and Japanese martial arts, which emphasise the importance of "moving from the hara", i.e. moving from the centre of one's very being – body and mind. There are a large number of breathing exercises in traditional Japanese and Chinese martial arts where attention is always kept on the dantian or hara to strengthen the "Sea of Qi".

== See also ==
- Acupuncture
- Dosha -vatta, pitta, Kapha (3 life elements in body)
- Fukushin
- Jing (TCM)
- Kiai
- Kundalini energy
- Meditation
- Mindfulness (Buddhism)
- Misogi
- Pushing hands
- Qigong
- Scientific skepticism
- Secret of the Golden Flower
- Silk reeling
- Tai chi
- Triple burner

== Sources ==
- Chia, Mantak. Cosmic Orbit: Connect to the Universe from Within. Universal Tao Publications, 2005. ISBN 974-85401-4-6
- Cohen, K. S. (1999). The Way of Qigong: The Art and Science of Chinese Energy Healing. Random House of Canada. ISBN 0-345-42109-4.
- Porkert, Manfred. The Theoretical Foundations of Chinese Medicine. MIT Press, 1974. ISBN 0-262-16058-7
- Rouselle, Irwin. ‘Spiritual Guidance in Contemporary Taoism’. In Spiritual Disciplines: Papers from the Eranos Yearbooks. Princeton University Press, 1960. ISBN 0-691-01863-4
- Wang, Mu. Foundations of Internal Alchemy: The Taoist Practice of Neidan. Golden Elixir Press, 2011. ISBN 978-0-9843082-5-5
- Yang, Jwing-Ming. (1989). The root of Chinese Chi kung: the secrets of Chi kung training. Yang's Martial Arts Association. ISBN 0-940871-07-6.
