= Japanese meridian therapy =

Type of traditional medical therapy

Japanese Meridian Therapy (JMT) (Japanese: 経絡治療; Keiraku Chiryō) is a classical style of Japanese treatment including moxibustion, acupuncture, kampo and Traditional manual therapy.

== History ==
Japanese Meridian therapy was developed in Japan in the 1930s that emphasizes palpation observation, pressure point manipulation and gentle needling that is drawing on primarily 2nd century BCE to 2nd century CE. Han Dynasty Chinese medical classics instead of later treatise of Traditional Chinese Medicine (TCM). Its primary goal is to assess and balance the body's innate natural ability to heal and to promote this for health and wellbeing.

Japanese Meridian Therapy draws primarily on three Han Dynasty Chinese medical classics that explicitly revived these ancient texts to ground their tactile somatic, meridian-focused practice and observations instead of just verbal theoretical, academic knowledge.

== The Three Classic ==
=== Huangdi Neijing ===
The Neijing is translated as The Yellow Emperor's Inner Classic, is a fundamental doctrine for Traditional Chinese was divided into two sections.

a) Suwen (Basic Questions) that included the cosmology explanation of yin and yang the Five phases the internal organs and social and natural lifestyle effects

b) Lingshu (Spiritual Pivot). The basis for the practice of acupuncture including the anatomy and physiology of classical treatment including needle techniques and point location.

=== Nan jing ===
The Nan jing, translated as The Classic of Difficulties, is the foundational text for traditional Japanese medicine as it brings clarity and is said to be the answers to the 81 complex chapters of the Huangdi Neijing, it contains an in depth explanation of the traditional treatment style using the five phase system, pulse diagnosis and Fukushin (abdominal (Hara) diagnosis) to address constitutional imbalances.

=== Shanghan Lun ===
The last of the three is the Shanghan Lun that translates as The Treatise on Cold Damage Diseases, is the classification of pathogenesis of exogenous factors and how to mitigate and mediate their outcomes to restore health

== Core Principles and Methods ==
Root and Branch Treatment: As it is understood within this traditionally based theory it operates on two levels. The first being the root application that balances the body’s overall constitution using the principles of Yin and Yang and the Five Phases/Elements system and what is called the branch that addresses the patient's specific symptomatic needs and then addresses the external presentation.

=== Diagnostics ===
Traditionally practitioners rely heavily on tactile palpable feedback and intuitive rational rather than logical verbal theoretical knowledge and confirmation. Diagnosis features palpation of related regions or dermatomes, pulse reading, and abdominal (hara) diagnosis to understand a person's constitution and prognosis.

=== Gentle pressing or Needling ===
Needles are secondary to understanding the construction of the constitution of the presenting patient, when needed the acupuncture needle's are typically very thin and inserted shallowly without deep, heavy stimulation. Practitioners frequently use other Japanese therapy tools that are noninvasive and superficially applied (like rounded metal probes on specific points) or traditional heat therapy (moxibustion) instead of, or alongside, needles.

== Schools of JMT ==
=== Toyohari Style ===
Toyohari is a highly refined form of meridian therapy founded by blind and visually impaired acupuncturists, utilizing specialized pulse diagnosis and ultra-gentle, non-insertive, or very shallow needling techniques.

=== Manaka Style ===
This style was developed by Dr. Yoshio Manaka, this approach focuses on balancing meridian pathways using innovative tools like "ion-pumping cords" alongside needles.

=== Ikeda Style ===
Developed by Ikeda Masakazu Sensei, known for the technique of advanced "Shunting": A method where excess or deficiencies are redirected through secondary pathways (shunted) rather than draining them out of the classical bodily system.

== Journals and Publications ==
The Clinician is the official publication for the Japanese acupuncture and moxibustion association

Introduction to Meridian Therapy

== See Also ==
Kampo

Japanese Medical Therapy tools

Fukushin

Shiatsu

Sugiyama Waichi
