= Japanese Medical Therapy Tools =

Traditional Japanese medicine therapeutic devices

Japanese Medical Therapy tools have an emphasis on a minimal, gentle and a non invasive approach to clinical applications, using wooden or metal instruments, heat therapy and very thin acupuncture needles with guide tubes, that may or may not be inserted into the superficial layer of the skin, It is quite common for practitioners to lightly press or hover over a palpated painful, (ashi)area for treatment.

== History ==
The tradition of Japanese medicine is built on a cultural view or belief system that has been influenced by centuries of Chinese medical and philosophical exchanges that have inevitably blended with indigenous Japanese beliefs, these beliefs are a synthesis of Shintoism, Buddhism and Japanese indigenous medical practices.

Originating in Japan via the Korean Peninsula between the 5th and 6th centuries. Over the centuries Japanese physicians from traditions of Meridian Therapy and Toyohari developed these unique tools designed specifically for the needs of the Japanese refined culture including superficial manipulation and application of therapeutic techniques to be applied to the skin's surface with minimal, or no pain to the patient for a favorable therapeutic result.

== Instruments ==
=== Teishin ===
A Teishin is a blunt, non-invasive probe made from precious metals like silver, gold, copper, or brass that does not puncturing the skin, it is pressed, rubbed, or held against specific therapeutic points. Used with sensitive or emotionally heightened patients.

=== Enshin ===
A small staff like wand with a small, rounded ball on the tip used to course along pathways.

=== Choki-Shin ===
Choki-Shi are a small rake instrument for light scratching and sensory stimulation used on the skin.

=== Zanshin ===
Are a cone-shaped for pressured focused, non-piercing pressure instrument.

=== Shonishin ===
These are specifically Pediatric Tools (Shonishin) Japanese therapy has developed a system for children that uses non-pearcing, small, blunt metal implements to lightly scratch, tap, or brush along implicated superficial areas of influence for the treatment of disease, illness or injury.

=== Shinkan ===
A Shinkan is a metal guide tube pressed on the surface the skin to provide painless and precise acupuncture treatments to patients.

=== Daishin ===
Daishin is a traditional Japanese wooden hammer used to rhythmically tap a blunt teishin or peg made from wooden, gold, or silver down the traditional medical channels, dermatomes or directly on indicated acupuncture points for a non evasive treatment of injury, disease or illness.

=== Ion Pumping Cords ===
Copper and rubber wires that connect two distal points together to naturally drain excess energy build-up from one part of the body to another.

=== Direct Heat ===
The utilisation of Moxa Punk (mugwort herb) & Warmers: High-grade Japanese moxa is rolled into tiny, rice-grain-sized pieces and burned directly over the skin. Tools like the Tiger Warmer hold glowing incense-like moxa sticks to gently roll heat across targeted tight zones in Hara treatment.

=== Ultra-Thin Needles ===
Japanese needles are significantly thinner and sharper than standard Chinese acupuncture needles, these needles are designed for painless insertion with Guide Tubes (Shinkan): Invented in Japan during the 1600s, these clear or metal tubes hold the thin needle steady. The practitioner taps the top of the needle, allowing for shallow superficial location and focussed precise placement, with Japanese needle or friction needle techniques, the needle may be or not inserted into the skin for the desired therapeutic result.

== See Also ==
Kampo

Japanese meridian therapy

Shiatsu

Sugiyama Waichi

Nan Jing (Chinese medicine)

Fukushin (abdominal hara diagnosis)
