= Kampo =

System of traditional medicine in Japan

Japanese name
- Kanji: 漢方医学
Transcriptions
- Romanization: Kanpō igaku

Chinese name
- Traditional Chinese: 日本漢方醫學
- Simplified Chinese: 日本汉方医学
- Literal meaning: "Method from the Han"
Transcriptions
Standard Mandarin
- Hanyu Pinyin: Rìběn Hànfāng yīxué
Yue: Cantonese
- Yale Romanization: Yaht-bún Hon-fōng yī-hohk

Kampo or Kanpō medicine (漢方医学, Kanpō igaku), often known simply as Kanpō (漢方; Herb medicine), is the study of traditional medicine in Japan following its introduction, beginning in the 6th century through cultural exchanges with China. It was adapted and modified to suit the Japanese culture and traditions. The broader category called Traditional Japanese medicine (TJM) includes acupuncture, jiushu (灸術) the heating of herbs, shoyaku (生薬) or herbal medicine and traditional manual therapies called anma (按摩) or sekkotsu (接骨). Kampo medicine in Japan is integrated into the Japanese national health care system and can only be administered to the public by a qualified and registered Western medical practitioner.

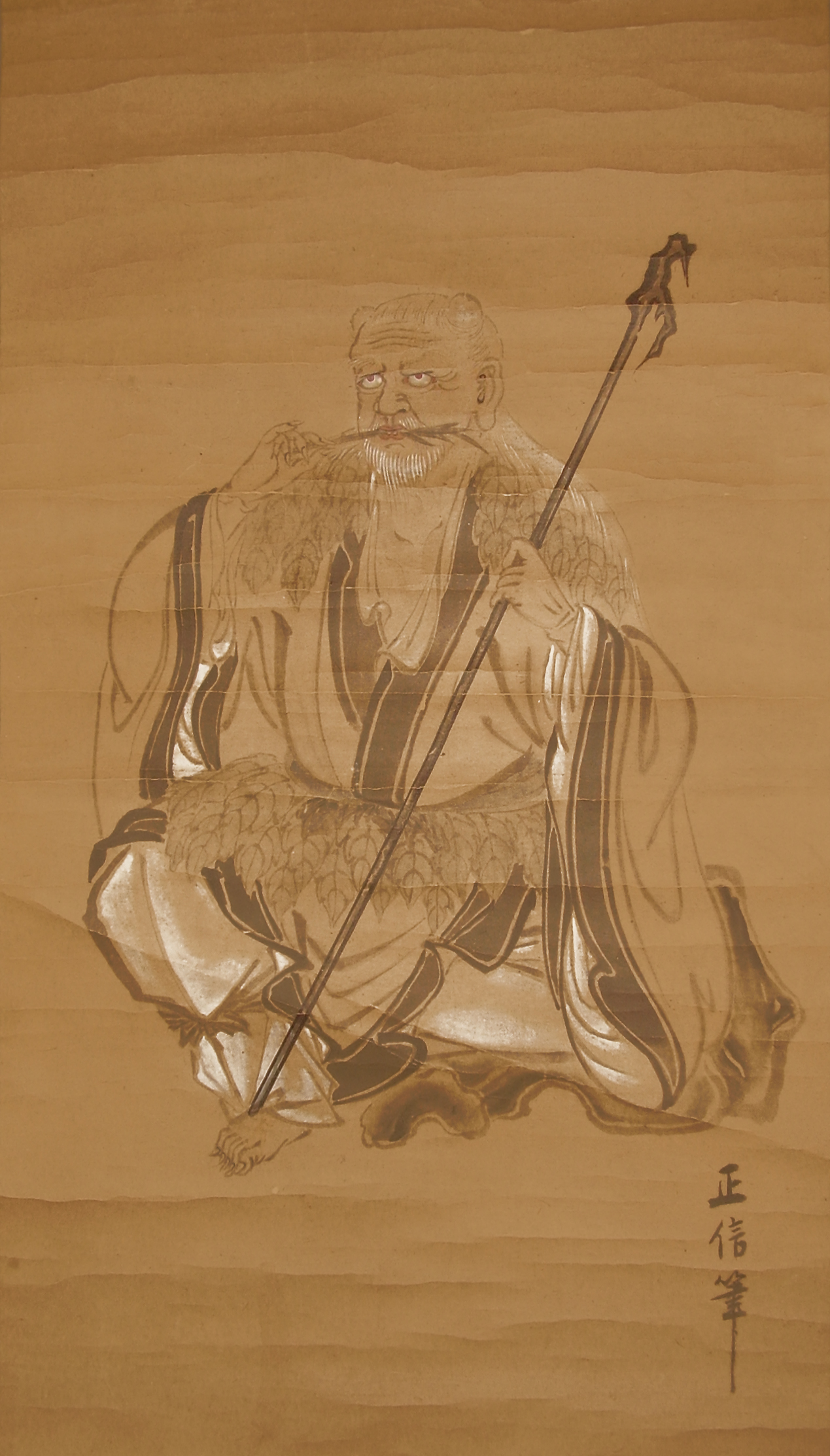
Shennong (Japanese: Shinnō) tasting herbs to ascertain their qualities (19th-century Japanese scroll)

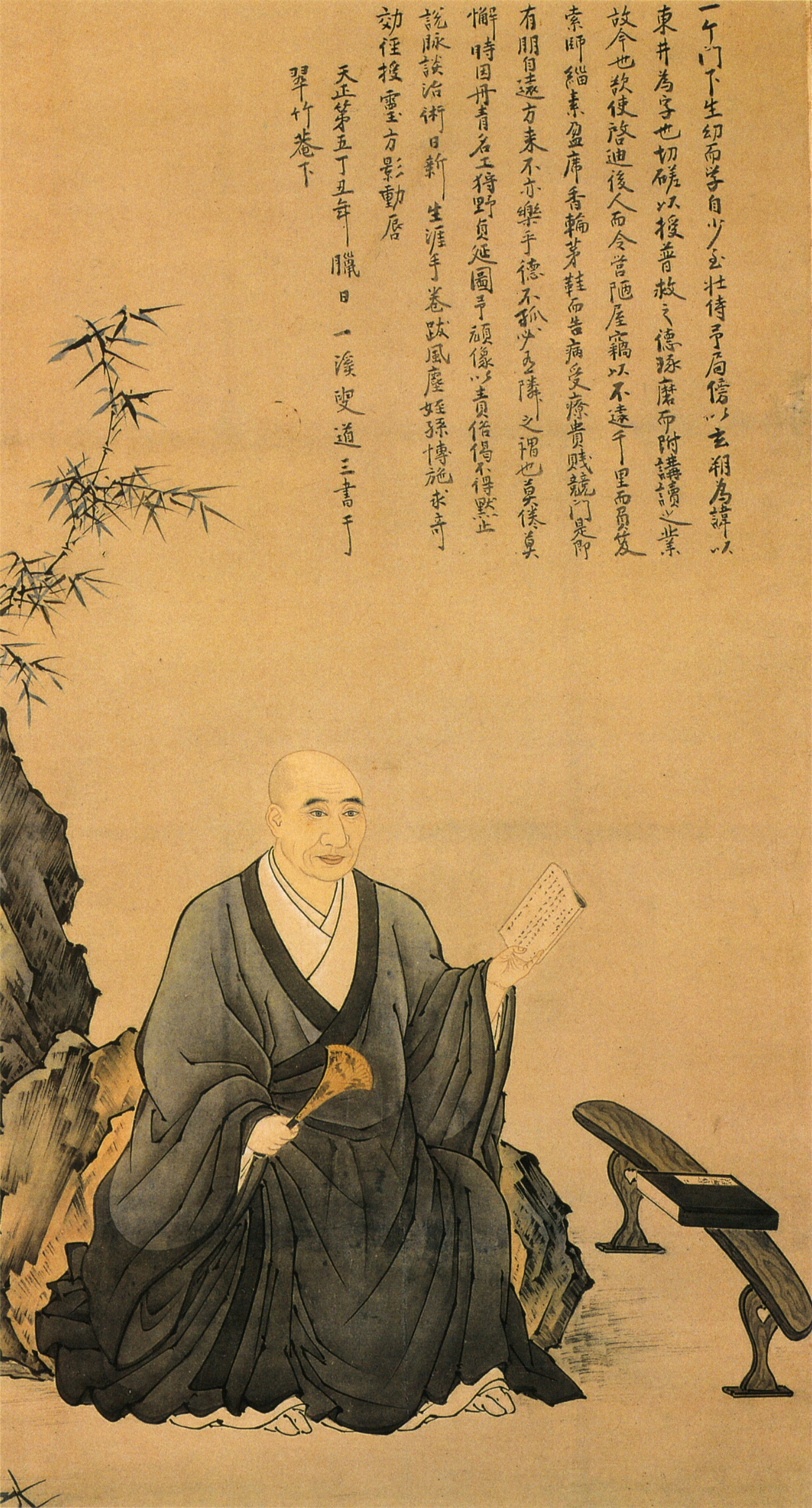
Manase Dōsan (1507–94) who laid the foundations for a more independent Japanese medicine

== History ==
=== Origins ===
According to Chinese mythology, the origins of traditional Chinese medicine are traced back to the three legendary sovereigns Fuxi, Shennong and the Yellow Emperor. Shennong is believed to have tasted hundreds of herbs to ascertain their medicinal value and effects on the human body and help relieve people of their sufferings. The oldest written record focusing solely on the medicinal use of plants was the Shennong Ben Cao Jing which was compiled around the end of the first century B.C. and is said to have classified 365 species of herbs or medicinal plants.

Chinese medical practices were introduced to Japan during the 6th century A.D. In 608, Empress Suiko dispatched E-Nichi, Fuku-In and other young physicians to China. It is said that they studied medicine there for 15 years. Until 838, Japan sent 19 missions to Tang China. While the officials studied Chinese government structures, physicians and many of the Japanese monks absorbed Chinese medical knowledge.

=== Early Japanese adaptation ===
In 702 A.D., the Taihō Code was promulgated as an adaptation of the governmental system of China's Tang dynasty. One section called for the establishment of a university (daigaku) including a medical school with an elaborate training program, but due to incessant civil war this program never became effective. Empress Kōmyō (701–760) established the Hidenin and Seyakuin in the Kōfuku-Temple (Kōfuku-ji) in Nara, being two Buddhist institutions that provided free healthcare and medicine for the needy. For centuries to come Japanese Buddhist monks were essential in conveying Chinese medical know-how to Japan and in providing health care for both the elite and the general population.

In 753 A.D., the Chinese priest Jianzhen (in Japanese Ganjin), who was well-versed in medicine, arrived in Japan after five failed attempts in 12 years to cross the East China Sea. As he was blind, he used his sense of smell to identify herbs. He brought medical texts and a large collection of materia medica to the imperial palace in Nara, which he dedicated to the Emperor Shōmu in 756, 49 days after the emperor's death. They are kept in a log-cabin-style treasure house of the Tōdai-Temple (Tōdai-ji) known as Shōsōin.

In 787 A.D., the "Newly Revised Materia Medica" (Xinxiu Bencao, 659 A.D.), which had been sponsored by the Tang Imperial Court, became an obligatory text in the study of medicine at the Japanese Health Ministry, but many of the 844 medicinal substances described in this book were not available in Japan at the time. Around 918 A.D., a Japanese medical dictionary entitled "Japanese names of (Chinese) Materia Medica" (Honzō-wamyō) was compiled, quoting from 60 Chinese medical works.

During the Heian period, Tanba Yasuyori (912–995) compiled the first Japanese medical book, Ishinpō ("Prescriptions from the Heart of Medicine"), drawing from numerous Chinese texts, some of which have perished later. During the period from 1200 to 1600, medicine in Japan became more practical. Most of the physicians were Buddhist monks who continued to use the formulas, theories and practices that had been introduced by the early envoys from Tang China.

=== Early revision ===
During the 15th and 16th centuries, Japanese physicians began to achieve a more independent view on Chinese medicine. After 12 years of studies in China Tashiro Sanki (1465–1537) became the leading figure of a movement called "Followers of Later Developments in Medicine" (Gosei-ha). This school propagated the Pi-Wei Lun and Zhu Tanxi teachings that gradually superseded the older doctrines from the Song dynasty. Manase Dōsan, one of his disciples, adapted Tashiro's teachings to Japanese conditions. Based on his own observation and experience, he compiled a book on internal medicine in eight volumes (Keiteki-shū) and established an influential private medical school (Keiteki-in) in Kyōto. His son Gensaku wrote a book of case studies (Igaku tenshō-ki) and developed a considerable number of new herb formulas.

From the second half of the 17th century, a new movement, the "Followers of Classic Methods" (Kohō-ha), evolved, which emphasized the teachings and formulas of the Chinese classic "Treatise on Cold Damage Disorders" (Shanghan Lun, in Japanese Shōkan-ron). While the etiological concepts of this school were as speculative as those of the Gosei-ha, the therapeutic approaches were based on empirical observations and practical experience due to another influential medical classic called the Huangdi Bashiyi Nanjing that was the study of difficult questions to the Neijing. This return to "classic methods" was initiated by Nagoya Gen'i (1628–1696), and advocated by influential proponents such as Gotō Gonzan (1659–1733), Yamawaki Tōyō (1705–1762), and Yoshimasu Tōdō (1702–1773). Yoshimasu is considered to be the most influential figure. He accepted any effective technique, regardless of its particular philosophical background. Yoshimasu's Fukushin (腹診) techniques or abdominal diagnostics are commonly credited with differentiating early modern traditional Japanese medicine from traditional Chinese medicine (TCM).

During the later part of the Edo period, many Japanese practitioners began to utilize elements of both schools. Some, such as Ogino Gengai (1737–1806), Ishizaka Sōtetsu (1770–1841), or Honma Sōken (1804–1872), even tried to incorporate allopathic concepts and therapies, which had made their way into the country through the German physicians that attended the Dutch trading-post Dejima (Nagasaki). Although allopathic medicine gained some ground in the field of surgery, there was not much competition between "Eastern" and "Western" schools until the 19th century, because even adherents of "Dutch-Studies" (Rangaku) were very eclectic in their actual practice.

Traditional medicine never lost its popularity throughout the Edo period, but it entered a period of rapid decline shortly after the Meiji Restoration. In 1871, the new government decided to modernize medical education based on the German medical system. Starting in 1875, new medical examinations focused on natural sciences and Western medical disciplines. In October 1883, a law retracted the licenses of any existing traditional practitioner. Despite losing legal standing, a small number of traditional physicians continued to practice privately. Some of them, such as Yamada Gyōkō (1808–1881), Asada Sōhaku (1813–1894), and Mori Risshi (1807–1885), organized an "Association to Preserve [Traditional] Knowledge" (Onchi-sha) and started to set up small hospitals. However, by 1887, the organization was disbanded due to internal policy dissent and the death of leading figures. The "Imperial Medical Association" (Teikoku Ikai), founded in 1894, was short-lived too. In 1895, the 8th National Assembly of the Diet vetoed a request to continue the practice of Kampō. When Azai Kokkan (1848–1903), one of the main activists, died, the Kampō movement was almost stamped out.

=== Era of Western influence ===
Any further attempt to save traditional practices had to take into account Western concepts and therapies. Therefore, it was graduates from medical faculties, trained in Western medicine, who began to set out to revive traditional practices. In 1910, Wada Keijūrō (1872–1916) published "The Iron Hammer of the Medical World" (Ikai no tettsui). Yumoto Kyūshin (1876–1942), a graduate from Kanazawa Medical School, was so impressed by this book that he became a student of Dr. Wada. His "Japanese-Chinese Medicine" (Kōkan igaku), published in 1927, was the first book on Kampō medicine in which Western medical findings were used to interpret classical Chinese texts. In 1927, Nakayama Tadanao (1895–1957) presented his "New Research on Kampō-Medicine" (Kampō-igaku no shin kenkyū). Another "convert" was Ōtsuka Keisetsu (1900–1980), who became one of the most famous Kampō practitioners of the 20th century.

This gradual revival was supported by the modernization of the dosage form of herbal medicine. During the 1920s, the Nagakura Pharmaceutical Company in Osaka began developing dried decoctions in a granular form. At about the same time, Tsumura Juntendō, a company founded by Tsumura Jūsha (1871–1941) in 1893, established a research institute to promote the development of standardized Kampō medicine. Gradually, these "Japanese-Chinese remedies" (wakan-yaku) became a standard method of Kampō medicine administration.

In 1937, new researchers such as Yakazu Dōmei (1905–2002) started to promote Kampō at the so-called "Takushoku University Kampo Seminar". More than 700 people attended these seminars that continued after the war. In 1938, following a proposal of Yakazu, the "Asia Medicine Association" was established. In 1941, Takeyama Shinichirō published his "Theories on the Restoration of Kampō Medicine" (Kampō-ijutsu fukkō no riron, 1941). In that same year, Yakazu, Ōtsuka, Kimura Nagahisa, and Shimizu Fujitarō (1886–1976) completed a book entitled "The Actual Practice of Kampō Medicine" (Kampō shinryō no jissai). By including Western medical disease names he greatly expanded the usage of Kampō formulas. A new version of this influential manual was printed in 1954. This book was also translated into Chinese. A completely revised version was published in 1969 under the title "Medical Dictionary of Kampō Practice" (Kampō Shinryō Iten).

In 1950, Ōtsuka Keisetsu, Yakazu Dōmei, Hosono Shirō (1899–1989), Okuda Kenzō (1884–1961), and other leaders of the pre- and postwar Kampō revival movement established the "Japan Society for Oriental Medicine" (Nippon Tōyō Igakkai) with 89 members (2014: more than 9000 members). In 1960, raw materials for crude drugs listed in the Japanese Pharmacopoeia (Nippon Yakkyoku-hō) received official drug prices under the National Health Insurance (NHI, Kokumin kenkō hoken).

== Approved Kampō medicines ==
Today in Japan, Kampō can only be administered by a licensed allopathic practitioner and is integrated into the Japanese national health care system. In 1967, the Ministry of Health, Labour and Welfare approved four Kampō medicines for reimbursement under the National Health Insurance (NHI) program. In 1976, 82 Kampō medicines were approved by the Ministry of Health, Labour and Welfare. This number has increased to 148 Kampō formulation extracts, 241 crude drugs, and 5 crude drug preparations.

Rather than modifying formulae as in traditional Chinese medicine, the Japanese Kampō tradition uses fixed patent herbal combinations in standardized proportions according to the classical literature of Chinese medicine. Kampō medicines are produced by various manufacturers. However, each medicine is composed of exactly the same ingredients under the Ministry's standardization methodology. The medicines are therefore prepared under strict manufacturing conditions that rival pharmaceutical companies. In October 2000, a nationwide study reported that 72% of registered physicians prescribe Kampō medicines. New Kampō medicines are being evaluated using modern techniques to evaluate their mechanism of action.

== Herbs ==
The 14th edition of the Japanese Pharmacopoeia (JP, Nihon yakkyokuhō) lists 165 herbal ingredients that are used in Kampō medicines. Lots of the Kampō products are routinely tested for heavy metals, purity, and microbial content to eliminate any contamination. Kampō medicines are tested for the levels of key chemical constituents as markers for quality control on every formula. This is carried out from the blending of the raw herbs to the end product according to the ministry's pharmaceutical standards.

Medicinal mushrooms like reishi and shiitake are herbal products with a long history of use. In Japan, the Agaricus blazei mushroom is a highly popular herb, which is used by close to 500,000 people. In Japan, Agaricus blazei is also the most popular herb used by cancer patients. The second most used herb is an isolate from the shiitake mushroom, known as active hexose correlated compound.

== Outside Japan ==
In the United States, Kampō is practiced mostly by acupuncturists, Chinese medicine practitioners, naturopath physicians, and other alternative medicine professionals. Kampō herbal formulae are studied under clinical trials, such as the clinical study of Honso Sho-saiko-to (H09) for treatment of hepatitis C at the New York Memorial Sloan-Kettering Cancer Center, and liver cirrhosis caused by hepatitis C at the UCSD Liver Center. Both clinical trials are sponsored by Honso USA, Inc., a branch of Honso Pharmaceutical Co., Ltd., Nagoya, Japan.

== Gallery ==
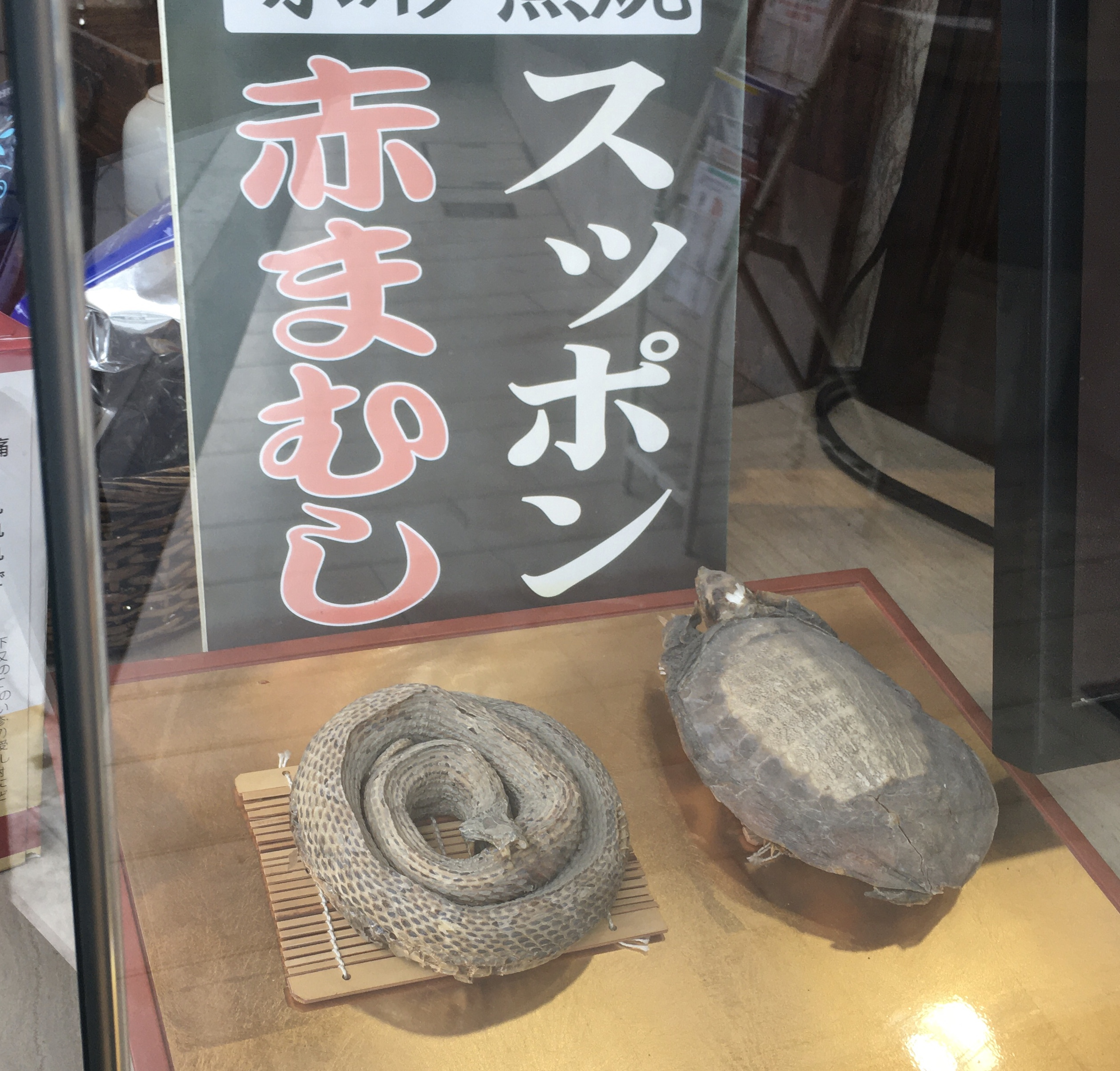
Kampo in Asakusa Tokyo Japan

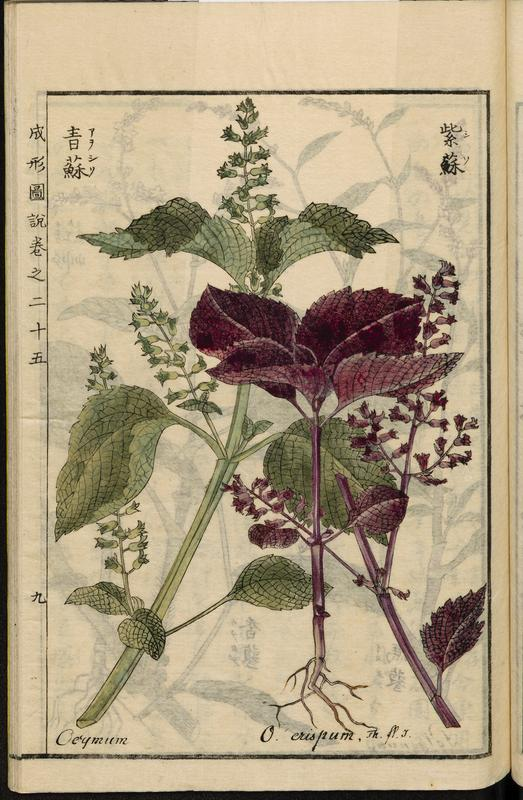
Leiden University Library - Seikei Zusetsu vol. 25, page 009 - 青蘇 - Perilla frutescens (L.) Britton, 1804

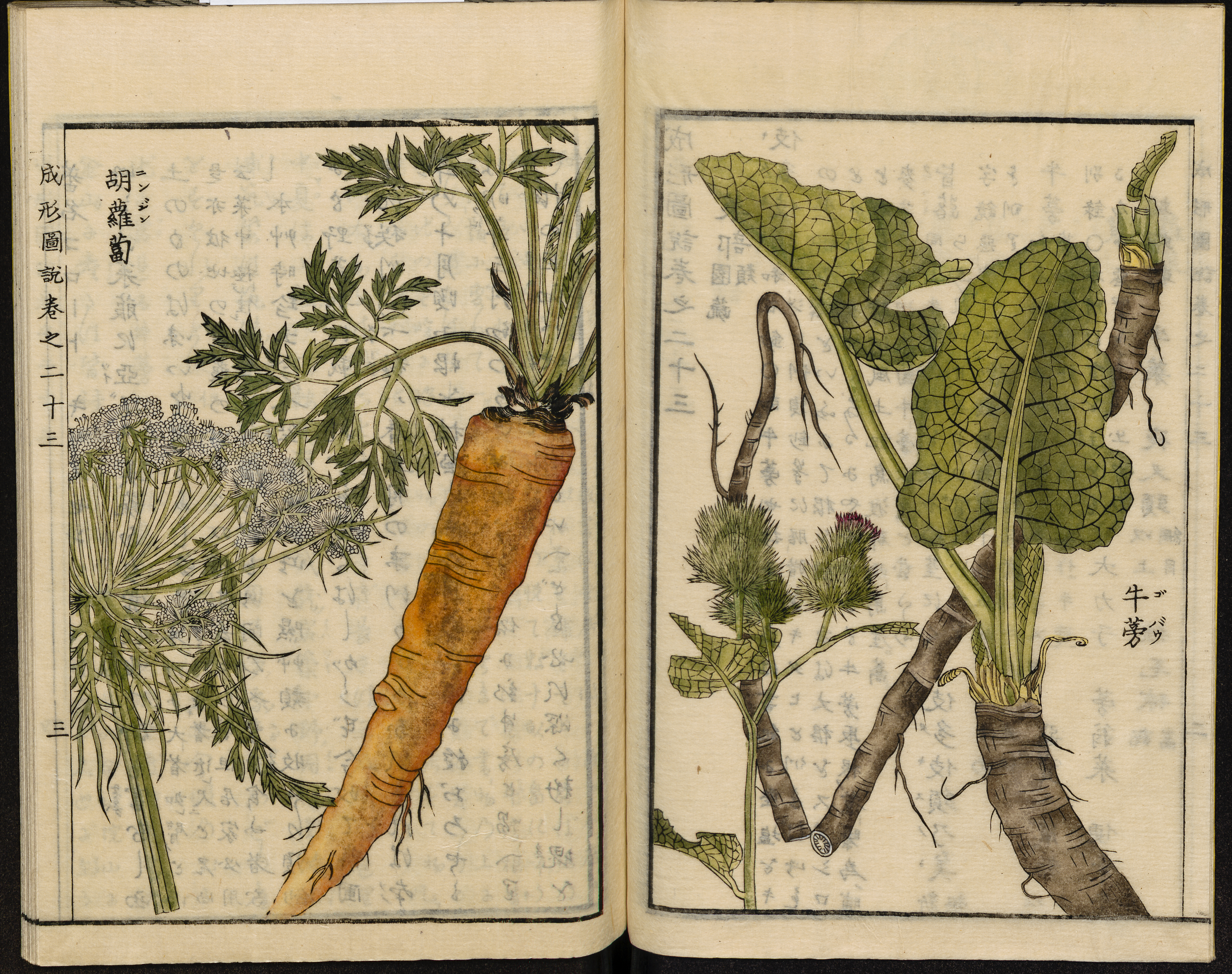
Leiden University Library - Seikei Zusetsu vol. 23, page 003 - 胡蘿蔔 - Daucus carota L. - 牛蒡 - Arctium lappa L., 1804

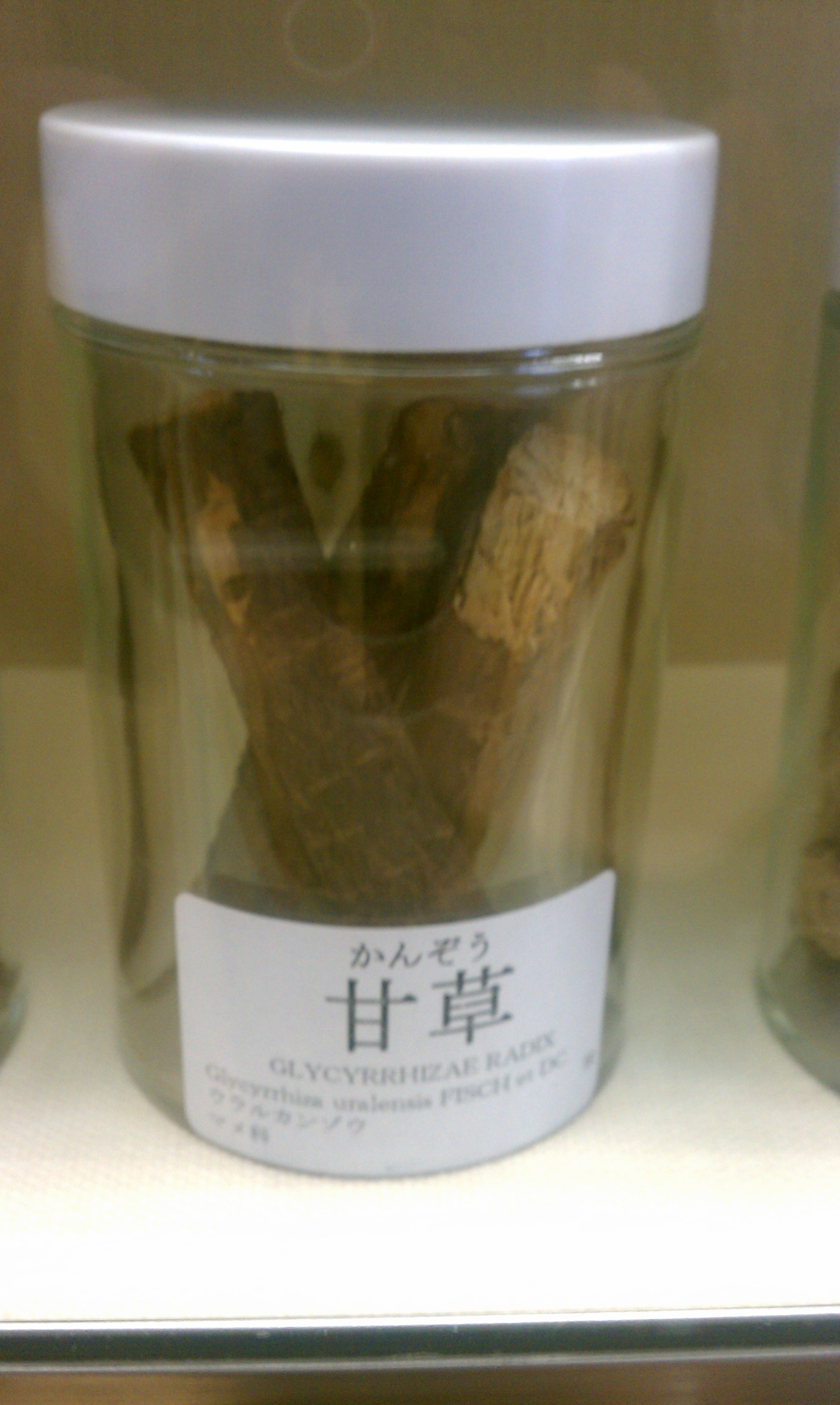
Glycyrrhiza (Licorice)

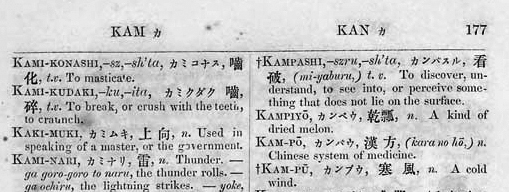
One of the first sources showing the term "Kampō" in its modern sense (James Curtis Hepburn: A Japanese and English Dictionary; with an English and Japanese Index. London: Trübner & Co., 1867, p. 177.)

== See also ==
- Chinese classic herbal formula
- Doumei Yakazu
- List of branches of alternative medicine
- Japanese Medical Therapy tools
- Jintan (Japanese medicine)
- Jin Shin Do
- Johrei
- Kappo
- Macrobiotic diet
- Nan Jing (Chinese medicine)
- Shiatsu
