= Sekkotsu =

Japanese art of bone-setting

Sekkotsu (接骨) or Judo therapy is the traditional Japanese art of bone-setting the application of non-surgical physical manipulation to treat fractures, dislocations, sprains, and bruises.It's origins date back to feudal Japan as a type of battlefield medicine and is used in many Budo(武道), or Japanese martial arts settings and disciplines in Japan today.

A Judo therapist is a Bone and Muscle Injury Specialist. It is the only Japanese national qualified license (国家資格) in the bone-setting area. The license issued under the Japanese Ministry of Health, Labour and Welfare.

== See also ==
- Anma
- Shiatsu
- Dit Da
- Tui na
- Kampo
