= Kiyoshi Ikenaga =

Japanese-Canadian shiatsu master

- Born: 1966 (age 59–60); Tokyo, Japan
- Education: Japan Shiatsu College
- Occupation: Shiatsupractor
- Title: SPR

Kiyoshi Ikenaga (池永清, Ikenaga Kiyoshi; born 1966) is a Shiatsu Master, Shiatsupractor (SPR), Chairperson and CEO of the Canadian College of Shiatsu Therapy, Founder/Director of the Canadian Shiatsu Society of BC, Director of the Canada Branch of the Japan Shiatsu Association, and Registered Instructor of the International Shiatsu Association.

== History ==
Kiyoshi Ikenaga was born in Tokyo in 1966. He studied Shiatsu directly with Tokujiro Namikoshi at the Japan Shiatsu College in Tokyo. After graduation in 1986, he obtained the license of "Anma, Massage, and Shiatsu" granted by the Ministry of Health, Labour and Welfare of Japan. After moving to Canada in 1996, he practiced and taught Shiatsu at the Shiatsu Academy of Tokyo in Toronto.

== Accomplishments ==
He established the Canadian College of Shiatsu Therapy in British Columbia and the Canadian Shiatsu Society of BC. He was appointed as the first Chairperson of the Canadian Branch of the Japan Shiatsu Association by the then Chairperson of the Japan Shiatsu Association, Tokujiro Namikoshi. Since then, he has endeavoured to popularize Shiatsu with Vancouver as his North American centre for the dissemination of Shiatsu. Graduates from the Canadian College of Shiatsu Therapy are participating as Shiatsupractors throughout Canada, the U.S.A., Europe and Australia.

He is a proponent of Tsubo Shiatsu as it elucidates anatomical and physiological references to the Tsubos of Shiatsu. He is the author of the book Tsubo Shiatsu, the monograph Shiatsu and Its Overseas Diffusion and Shin-ryo Performed by a Shiatsupractor. His father, Takuo Ikenaga, is the current Executive Director of the Japan Shiatsu Association.
