= Hiroshi Nozaki =

- Born: January 28, 1926
- Died: October 31, 2006 (aged 80)
- Education: Chuo University
- Children: Elisa Nozaki

Hiroshi Nozaki (1926-2006) was a Shiatsu master and alternative healer well known in Switzerland, France and Italy for his innovative techniques of Shiatsu, Qigong and Yoga and for starting the Ko School of Shiatsu (School of Lightness in Japanese Language 光). He is known for founding Hiron Shiatsu a branch of Shiatsu.

Two books have been written about Nozaki’s life and techniques. The first was published in 2008, Hiroshi’s Rucksack of Wisdom by Maria Eisele and Hirako Toyoko Reymond. The second was in 2009, Hiroshi Nozaki School of Lightness. Swiss TV has made a documentary of his life and teachings. Nozaki treated hundreds of persons during his lifetime including Prince Tomhito Mikasa the first cousin of Emperor Akihito and known as the bearded Prince.

== Biography ==
Nozaki was (aka Hiron) was born 21 January 1929 in Sapporo, Japan. He was the son of a blind shiatsu therapist and naturopathic physician who taught his techniques to his son. After the WWII Nozaki studied law at Chuo University but was attracted to the idea of helping others and left this world to train in the healing arts. He was trained by renowned Japanese masters in Shiatsu, including such Shiastsu masters as Tokujiro Namikoshi, he was also trained in acupuncture, Qigong and Yoga. His blind father always remained, however, his most important teacher, because he showed him the inner spiritual side of Shiatsu and how to use his intuition to understand and treat patients needs.

In 1973 Nozaki left Japan and began teaching in Switzerland founded the Ko School of Shiatsu in 1990 and developed a technique of shiatsu called the Hiron Shiatsu. It is a type of Shiatsu that focuses holistic healing and intuitive interpretation of healing needs of the patient. The technique emphasized the co-relations between the hands, feet, face and entire body. Hiron Shiatsu includes various invigorating and relaxing foot massage techniques that work on the spine and - as a special feature - also the use of one's own feet. Hiroshi Nozaki’s doctrine consisted in large part to identify ways how to take responsibility for a healthy and happy life in your own hands.

Nozaki was famous for his teaching that “By studying natural medicine you are your best doctor to protect your body and mind from disease−−Happiness, and health exists for all. He was known to say as his motto that "Deep truths are always simple". He loved nature and was quoted by an article in Shiatsu Xin magazine as the Master of Nature Healing.

Nozaki died 2006 at the age of 77 years in Switzerland. He had one daughter Elisa Nozaki.
