= Ikenaga =

Ikenaga (written: 池永) is a Japanese surname. Notable people with the surname include:

- Kiyoshi Ikenaga (池永 清, born 1966), shiatsu practitioner
- Masaaki Ikenaga (池永 正明, 1946–2022), Japanese baseball player
- Takashi Ikenaga (池永 天志, born 1993), Japanese shogi player
- Wataru Ikenaga (池永 航, born 1991), Japanese footballer
