= Pi Wei Lun =

Jin-Yuan Chinese medical text

The Pi Wei Lun (Chinese: 脾胃論, Treatise on the Spleen and Stomach) is an influential classical text for practitioners of Traditional Chinese medicine (TCM). Written during the Jin and Yuan dynasties and attributed to the Chinese medical physician Li Dongyuan (李東垣 ,1180–1251).

This text was the foundation for the development of what would come to be known as the Earth School or the Spleen and Stomach School, within this text these Zangfu organs are posited as having a central role in the formation and maintenance of what is called postnatal energy or Jing (精), therefore they are within this theory foremost in the provision of good health, vitality and longevity therefore and in the prevention of illness and disease.

== Theoretical overview ==
In a time that most medical schools were concerned with the treatment of exogenous disease caused by environmental factors most medical frameworks concentrated on primarily on the six external pathogens and not on endogenous disease states that included deficiency, chronicity and over work, overthinking.

== The Root of Disease ==
Within this text the root cause of illness and disease was reported as being due to the dysfunction of the digestive system that traditionally incorporated the Spleen and Stomach. Within this theory these two Zangfu paired organs are at the centre of what also is reported to represent the Earth element in the ancient Wuxing (five phase) theory, these organ relationships are responsible for transportation and transformation of food and fluids into body fluids, bodily energy and blood. It is said that that if there is a disfunction with the digestive system caused through poor diet, physical and or emotional overexertion it can lead to patterns of systemic inflammation, chronic illnesses, deficiency syndromes and what is called internal heat.

== Yin Fire Theory Yin Huo (陰火) ==
When the central Spleens function is disrupted there is what is called in this theory a contravention of energy where the heat rises or flares up to manifest as an excessive heat like febrile disease but actually originate from a deficiency called Yin fire or false heat, changing the clinical observations of the time from symptoms that would have been attributed to an excess heat pattern, to one that has its origin from an internal deficiency.

== See also ==
- Acupuncture
- Chinese herbology
- Fukushin
- Jing (Chinese medicine)
- Kampo
- Traditional Chinese medicine
- Wuxing
