= Dōmei Yakazu =

Japanese physician (1905–2002)

Dōmei Yakazu (矢数 道明, Yakazu Dōmei; December 7, 1905 – October 21, 2002) was a Japanese physician who contributed to the restoration of kampo medicine in Japan. In 1979, he was awarded the lifetime achievement award (最高優功賞, Saikō Yūkō Shō) by the Japanese Medical Association for his contributions to oriental medicine.

== Life ==
Yakazu was born in 1905 as Shirō, the fourth son of Tatsunosuke Yakazu and Sute Yakazu, in Omiya (currently Hitachiōmiya, Ibaraki Prefecture). He graduated from Mito Commercial School and entered Tokyo Medical University majoring in traditional Chinese medicine under Professor Mori Dohaku along with his elder brother Kaku. He graduated in 1930, and less than a year later, he adopted the art-name Dōmei Yakazu. In 1933, he started his own clinic, Onchido Iin, in Tokyo, with his younger brother Yudo.

== Restoration Movement of Chinese Medicine ==
In 1933, Yakazu's younger brother Yudo was diagnosed with typhoid fever. Western medicine seemed to do little for his health so he sought the help of Keisetsu Ohtsuka, another kampo physician. Yudo recovered, which Dōmei considered a miracle. This became an important meeting of the two schools of kampo medicine. Yakazu belonged to the new school, while Ohtsuka belonged to the more classical one. After this meeting the two schools were united, which marked the beginning of the restoration of kampo medicine. Yakazu, Ohtsuka and the physician Totaro Shimizu formed a Japanese Kampo Medicine Association in 1934.a They began the publication of a monthly journal titled Kampo and Kampo Drugs.

Other important members included Kyushin Yumoto and Kenzo Okuda of the classical school; Chokyu Kimura, Anshu Anzai, Yasuaki Nakano, and Kōmon Morita of the intermediate school; Kōzō Kurihara and Yūshiro Kimura in pharmacology; Sorei Yanagiya in acupuncture; and Yasuhide Ishihara in medical history. However, the promotion of kampo medicine as a branch of medicine was prohibited by the Interior ministry, which corresponds to the present Ministry of Health, Labour and Welfare (Japan). Although kampo medicine was not popular at that time, more than 1000 people joined the association.

=== Lectures in Kampo Medicine at Takushoku University ===
In 1936, Dōmei, Ohtsuka and others began lecturing at Takushoku University. The calligraphy for the opening ceremony was written by Tōyama Mitsuru (1855–1944), who was a political leader in early 20th century Japan. A total of 61 people attended the first lectures. The president of Takushoku University formally accepted the lectures in 1937 as the aptly named Takushoku University Kampo Medicine Lectures. These lectures were followed by the Kampo Medicine Lectures of Kampo Tomonokai, with the assistance of President Tsumura Juntendo. These were replaced by the present Institute of Kampo Medicine.

=== Traditional Medicine, Asia and Manchuria ===
In 1938, following a proposal by Dōmei, the Asia Medicine Association was established. It began publishing the journal Toa Igaku (Asian Medicine) in 1939. According to policy at the time, it was classified as Kampo and kampo drugs. Later, in 1954, Domei restarted Toa Igaku and became its chairman of directors. He also published the monthly Kanpo no rinsho (Clinics of Kanpo). In 1940, he attended a conference on traditional medicine in Manchurian medical universities, and proposed the continuation of traditional medicine there. His proposal was subsequently accepted.

== The Practice of Kampo Medicine ==
In 1941, Dōmei of the post-classical school, Keisetsu Ohtsuka of the classical school, Nagahisa Kimura of the intermediate school, and Fujitaro Shimizu of pharmacology completed a book entitled Practice of Kampo Medicine, published by Nanzando after 3 years of preparation. This was a revolutionary textbook because it was written so that those who had studied Western medicine could learn kampo medicine on their own. This book has also been translated into Chinese. The second edition was published in 1954.

== Imperial Japanese Army ==
In October 1941, Dōmei was drafted and became a doctor of the Imperial Japanese Army. He was sent to Rabaul and Bougainville Island in the Philippines. There, he learned the local method of kampo, in which a local plant, sago, is eaten. This is reported to have saved the lives of many soldiers.

He returned to Japan in March 1946. In 1973, Dōmei revisited the island and presented an organ to the local village. He wrote a book, The records of Bougainville Island Army Hospital, in 1976.

== Postwar Years ==
After returning to Japan, he worked at his office in Ibaraki Prefecture. In 1949, he became a member of the Japan Oriental Medicine Association preparatory committee. In 1951, he established the Onchido Yakazu doctor's office in Ogawacho, Shinjuku, Tokyo. In 1950, he assumed a post as one of the directors of the Japan Oriental Medicine Association, and between 1959 and 1962 he was the chairman of its board of directors. The Japan Oriental Medicine Association was allowed to join the Japan Medical Association later in 1991. At long last, kampo medicine was accepted in 2008 as one recognized branch of medicine. This also included kampo internal medicine, kampo surgery and kampo allergy medicine.

== University education, Ph.D. and Awards ==
In 1953, Yakazu lectured on oriental medicine at Tokyo Medical University. The following year he started his Ph.D. studies under the guidance of professor Saburō Hara (pharmacology). He completed his studies on the pharmacological uses of Aconitum.

In 1960, he joined the board of trustee of the Japanese Society for the History of Medicine (Nihon Ishi Gakkai). In 1988, he established the "Yakazu Medical History Award" using his retirement grant.

In November 1979, he received the Career Excellence Award (Saikō Yūkoshō, 最高優功賞 (Saikō Yūkō Shō) by the Japan Medical Association for his contributions to oriental medicine.

In 1980, he assumed the top post of the Kitasato University Oriental Medicine Research Center, and in 1982, he became a member of the communications committee of eight oriental medicine centers.

In 1981, he received a Doctor of Letters by Keio University for his studies on medical history, especially Manase Dōsan (1507-1594) and his school. Yakazu is known to have inspired many physicians to study the history Japanese medicine.

On October 21, 2002, he died of natural causes.

== Publications ==
- Explanations of Kampo Prescriptions Nihon Kanpo Igakkai, 1940
- Keisetsu Ohtsuka, etc., Practice of Kampo Medicine, 1941, Nanzando, revised in 1954
- Kampo Kosei Yoho Prescriptions Explained 1959, Idono Nihonsha
- 100 Stories of Kanpo in 8 series, 1960–1995, Idono Nihonsha
- Kampo Prescriptions, Clinical Applications, 1966, Sogensha
- A Chronological Table of Kampo 1968, Onchikai
- Keisetsu Otsuka et al., Kampo Medicine Textbook, 1969, Nanzando
- The Records of Bougainvillea Island Army Hospital, 1976, Idono Nihonsha.
- Ohtsuka Keisetsu, Dōmei Yakazu, Modern Kanmo Books Collected 1–116, 1979–1984, Meicho Shuppan
- Dōmei Yakazu, Keido Yakazu, Kampo Prescriptions according to Symptoms and Disease, by Kakazu Dōmei and Yakazu Keido 1979, Shufuno Tomosha*Dōmei Yakazu,110 Years of Kampo and Future 1979, Shunyodo
- Katsu Inaba et al., Fukusho Kiran 1981, Idono Nihon
- Dōmei Yakazu, Kampo Questions and Answers 1991, Nihon Ijishinposha
- Dōmei Yakazu, Kosan Sakaguchi, Kampo Mugen, the Origin of Modern Kanpo 1992, Modori Shobo
- Ippō Okamoto, Dōmei Yakazu et al. Hōi Bengi 2003, Meicho Shuppan
