= Fukushin =

Abdominal Hara diagnosis in traditional Japanese medicine

In traditional Japanese medicine (TJM), Fukushin (腹診) translated as Hara diagnosis or abdominal diagnosis in English, this diagnostic tool was developed in mediaeval Japan, it is one of the central diagnostic methods involving the palpation of the whole abdomen or belly to evaluate a patient's overall constitutional health and vitality. TJM includes the modalities of Japanese acupuncture and Meridian therapy, Anma and Kampo herbal medicine.

Fukushin, image from clinical notes for Japanese Hara Diagnosis.

The tradition of Japanese medicine is built on a cultural view or belief system that has been influenced by centuries of Chinese medical and philosophical exchanges that have enevitably blended with indigenous Japanese beliefs, these beliefs are a synthesis of Shintoism, Buddhism and Japanese indigenous medical practices. In this cultural view the Hara occupies a central role in one's health as it is viewed as central to ones health and wellbeing.

Within the TJM framework, as a medical diagnostic tool for the physician this practice fundamentally holds a different conceptual position than in allopathic evidence based biomedicine as it is based on objective observations of a qualitative nature rather than subjective structural investigation for pathological manifestations.

== Hara in Japanese Culture ==
While the idea of dantian is used in many Chinese philosophical and religious fields, including Taoism, medicine, meditation, alchemy, the traditional Japanese medical interpretation is much broader in its meaning. The classical Chinese definition of the lower dantian is it that it is located around two to three finger breaths below the umbilicus and anterior to the spine between the left and right kidneys and within this theory are reported to be the primordial yin and yang of the body connected with the ancient concept of Jing (essence). Where as the Japanese interpretation is that Hara is the whole of the abdomen, ranging anatomically from the bottom of the sternum to the top of the pelvic bone. Diagnosis is superior, inferior and lateral to and including the umbilicus. Furthermore the Tanden (丹田) (Chinese, dantian) is a specific theoretical anatomical consideration in diagnosis and overall prognosis of health, vitality, disease or illness.

== History ==
The history of this theory has its roots in ancient Chinese medical text from the Han dynasty of China, but one should add that the technique of abdominal diagnosis was largely underutilized or overlooked by traditional Chinese practitioners and schools, and not until the Japanese with a system that is built inherently on a pragmatic tactical feedback loop, that this theory was developed through clinical palatable observations and treatment outcomes.

=== The Han Dynasty (206 BCE to 220 CE) ===
Abdominal examination is outlined in ancient traditional Chinese medical text three of the most prominent and poignant to the context of this subject were the Kotei Naikyo (The Yellow Emperors Inner Classic), Nan gyo (The classic of Difficulties) and the Shokanron (Treatise on Cold Damage), these two latter classic were to be the foundation to the explorative nature of the early frontier of Japanese medical physicians interpretation of the former Classic. While all of these classics have discourse on abdominal diagnosis and treatment through the front Mu points, the Chinese medical culture of the time was to concentrate on tongue, pulse and theoretical pattern diagnosis rather than the abdomen being a primary diagnostic tool.

=== The Edo Period (1603 CE–1867 CE) ===
Due to Japan closing its boarders to foreign influence during the Edo period this could be seen as the driving force for Japanese physicians to rely on clinical observations for building and verification of therapeutic results, rather than relying on theoretical philosophical Chinese text.

== Two Schools of Influence ==
The first was to be called the Goseiha School (後世派), that took its influence from what is known as The Earth School or in Chinese Pi Wei Lun (Treatise on the Spleen and Stomach), this School was founded by Li Dongguan in 13th-century. The core philosophy was based on that the abdomen was the microcosm of the Gogyo, five phases and that the earth element and it's corresponding organ relationships the Spleen and stomach are at the centre of all physiological and psychological health or disease within all human life. Palpation indicators related to the internal organs of the Zungfu theory and were aimed at treatment of the organs

The second was the Kohoha School(古方派), know as the Ancient Methods, this school rejected theoretical abstract celestial theories on the Gogyo five phases and Zangfu and primarily focused on the yin,yang theory of the six divisions of exogenous and endogenous disease outlined within the text of the Shokanron (Treatise on"Cold Damage)". Disorders for this school were observed as directly palpable abdominal observations, of temperature, quality, quantity, texture and turgaue that could be classified as syndromes to be treated by a specific Kampo herbal formula.

== Hara Diagnostic Theory ==
In this theory it is understood that the abdomen as it is the centre of the body reflects the state of constitutional health of the entire body of the patient for the practitioner. The regions of the abdomen correspond to specific organs and gogyo elements and always looking at the state of the bodily energy (Ki,気), blood (Ketsu, 血) and fluids (Sui,水) .This palpation technique differs from allopathic medical examination in the way that it is light in touch and looking for qualitative imbalances like temperature, tightness, weakness or tenderness rather than to press deeply to find physical pathologies.

=== Kohoha School Corisdances ===
Shin-ka hi-kō (心下痞硬), Tension, or hardness below the heart, epigastrium.

Kyōkyō-ku-man (胸脇苦満), Fullness, or resistance beneath the ribs.

Fuku-choku-kin kyū (腹直筋拘急), Rectus muscle involvment with tension, spasm.

Shō-fuku-kō-man (少腹硬満), Lower abdominal hardness and fullness.

Shō-fuku-kyū-ketsu (少腹急結), Localised lower abdominal acute pain on palpation, firmness tightness or knotting

Shō-fuku-fu-jin (少腹不仁), Lower abdominal numbness or insensitivity.

Fuku-hyō-kō-kyū (腹皮拘急),Abdominal wall tightness and or constriction

Shin-ka-shin-sui (心下振水音), Epigastric sloshing or fluid like sound.

=== Goseiha School Corisdances ===
In classical text the Hara was divided into its Gogyo, five phase correspondences reflecting the pre heaven arrangement of Shen, Qi, Jing within the Hara arrangement.

Ka,火(Fire), Is at the top of the abdomen directly below the sternum and anterior to the umbilicus, as it is related to fire it is common to observe heat symptoms and syndromes, including tension, anxiety and restlessness, and vitality Shen based symptomology.

Moku,木(Wood), To the right side of the umbilicus, as the liver is prone to stagnation, there could be muscular guarding, twitching and frustration

Kin,金(Metal), It's location is to the left of the umbilicus, this section is associated with the lung, assessment of bodily fluids and overall immunity, there is an associated grief.

Do,土(Earth), Located directly in the dead center around the umbilicus. This zone judges the Spleen and Stomach systems, tracking digestive transformations and fundamental metabolic "grounding."

Sui,水(Water), Inferior to the umbilicus, and superior to the pubic bone is associated to the kidney bladder and Tanden with the stamina and Jing based symptomology.

== See also ==
Kampo

Japanese Acupuncture

Japanese Meridian therapy

Japanese medical therapy tools

Japanese Buddhism
