= Tashiro Sanki =

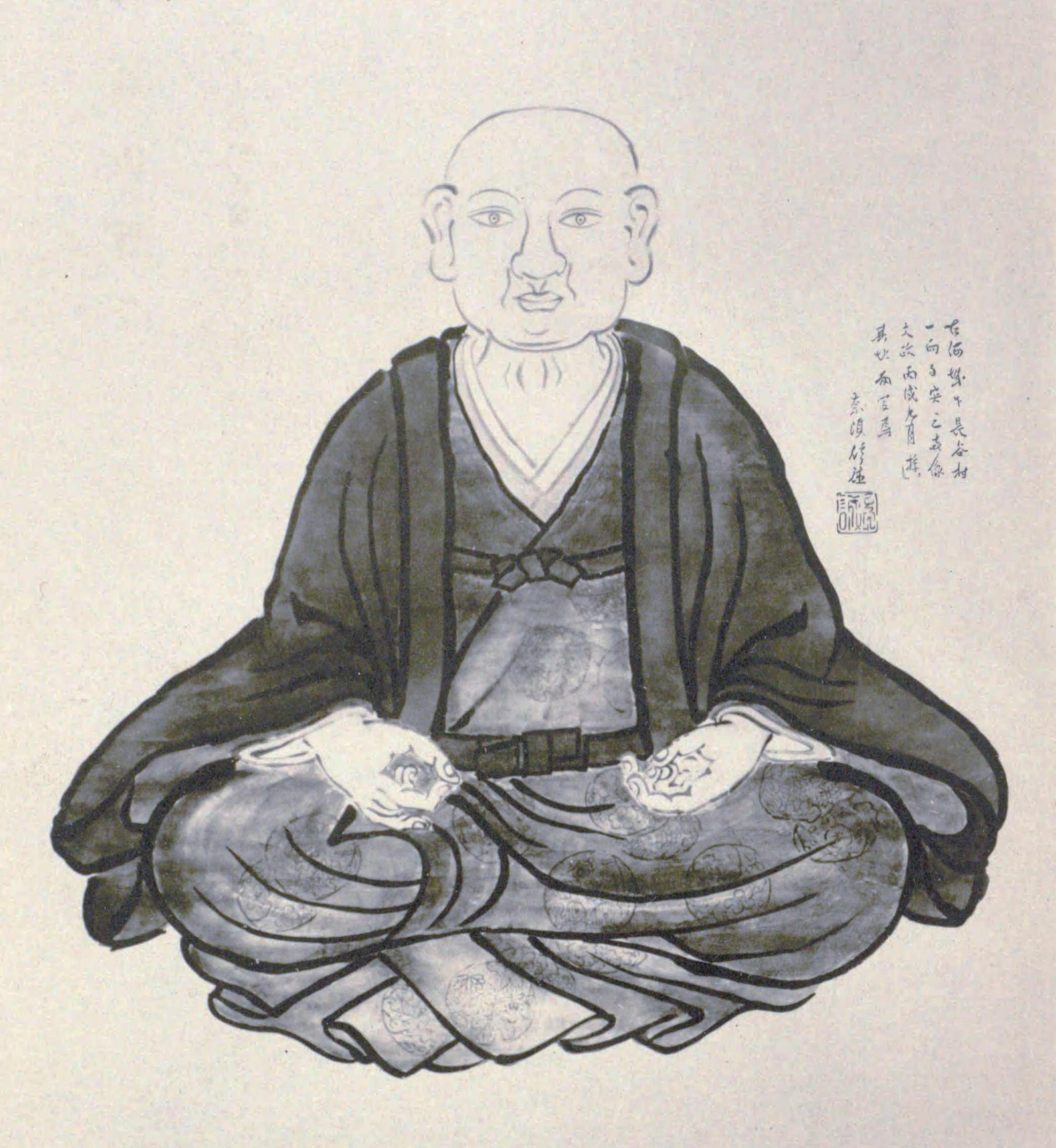

Tashiro Sanki (田代 三喜; 1465–1537) was a Japanese doctor of kampo and the founder of the Gosei-ha school of medicine. He was a teacher of Manase Dōsan.

Tashiro studied abroad in China between 1487 and 1498, and returned to Japan with new ideas regarding medicine. He promulgated the use of medicine for emotional disorders.

Tashiro's workbooks were written in a cryptic style, using uncommon characters and terminology, in order to preserve the secrets of his school for initiates only.
