= Bone-setting =

Practitioner of joint manipulation

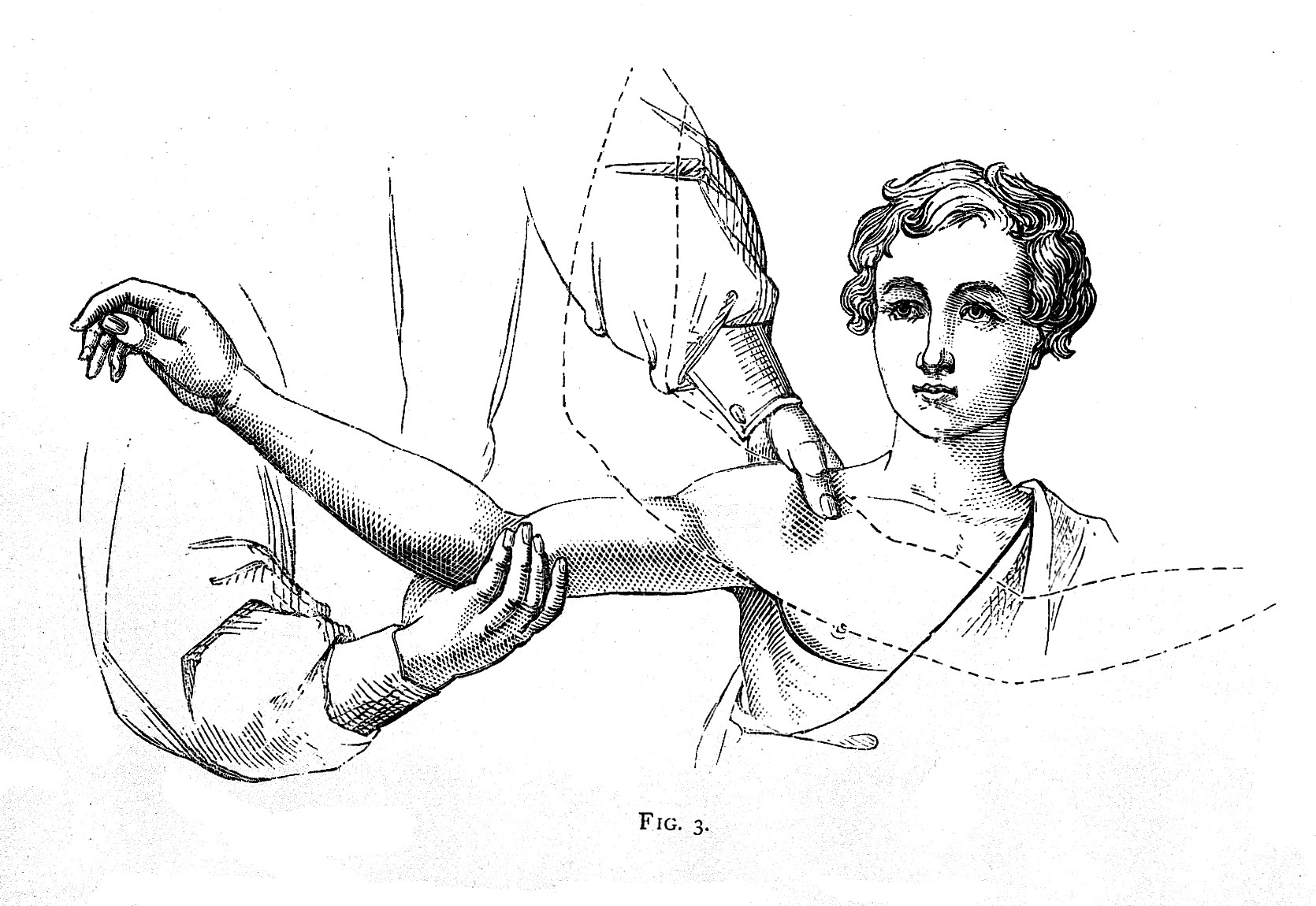
An example of On-bone setting by W.P. Hood

Bone-setting is a type of a folk medicine in which practitioners engage in joint manipulation, such as reducing joint dislocations and resetting bone fractures. The practice dates back thousands of years, has appeared throughout the world, and predates formal training in accepted modern medical procedures. Before the advent of chiropractors, osteopaths, and physical therapists, bone-setters were the main providers of this type of treatment.

== History ==
The practice of joint manipulation and treating fractures dates back to ancient times and has roots in most countries. The earliest known medical text, the Edwin Smith papyrus of 1552 BC, describes the Ancient Egyptian treatment of bone-related injuries. These early bone-setters would treat fractures with wooden splints wrapped in bandages or make a cast around the injury out of a plaster-like mixture. It is unknown whether they performed amputations.

In the 16th century, monks and nuns with some knowledge of medicine became healers and bone-setters after the dissolution of monasteries in the British Isles. However, many bone-setters were non-religious, and most were self-taught. Their skills were then passed on from generation to generation, creating families of bone-setters. Notable families include the Taylor family of Whitworth, the Thomas family of Anglesey and the Matthew family of the Midlands, which practiced for more than 200 years.

With the advancement of modern medicine beginning in the 18th century, bone-setters began to be recognised for their efficiency in treatment, but did not receive the praise or status that physicians did. Some of these self-taught healers were considered legitimate, while others were perceived as "charlatans" or "quacks". In Great Britain, one of the most famous was the bone-setter Sally Mapp (d. 1737). Known as "Crazy Sally", she learned her skill from her father and was known for her arm strength and ability to reset almost any bone. Though she lacked the medical education of physicians, she successfully treated dislocated shoulders and knees, among other treatments, at the Grecian Coffee House in London and in the town of Epsom. In the United States, the "Bone-setter" Sweet family carried the skill for generations, with Charles Sweet being one of the most famous bone-setters in all of New England. In Italy, Regina Dal Cin, a bone-setter who learned the skill from her mother, is considered to be an expert in the reconstruction of the congenital and antiquated dislocations of the femur.

Bone-setters treated most of the population, including Royal families when court physicians were inadequate or inefficient.

The Apothecaries Act 1815 in Great Britain called for surgeons to take courses similar to physicians, a move that would raise the status of surgeons to be more in line with that of the elite physician. This allowed some bone-setters to transition into the medical profession and encouraged interest in bone and joint surgery. As a result, surgical instruments and tools for bone-related injuries were developed.

== 21st century ==
In some developing countries, traditional bone-setters are popular and can be the only address for treatment of bone-related injuries. Most often, it will be the case that there is a shortage of orthopedic doctors and surgeons in the country, and so the two practitioners coexist in the same setting. In parts of South America, Asia and Africa, traditional bone-setters treat musculoskeletal injuries in general, not just fractures and dislocations. Traditional bone-setters are also known to offer cheaper services and prompt treatment.

In Japan, bone-setting is known as sekkotsu. In India, practitioners are known as haad vaidyas. In China, it is known as die-da, and is practiced by martial artists. In Bulgaria, they are called Chakrukchia or Чакръкчия in Cyrillic. In Portugal it is known as endireita.

== Manipulative surgery ==
In a 1932 book on the subject, A. S. Blundell Bankart defined manipulative surgery as "the art and practice of moving joints for therapeutic purposes". In an address delivered to the Royal Society of Medicine in 1923, R. C. Elmslie described the "use of manipulative methods in surgery" as having grown in recent years. He said that "formerly such practitioners were called 'bone-setters'". A book review in Nature in 1934 said that manipulative surgery was "almost a monopoly of the bone-setter".

== See also ==
- Chiropractic, a form of alternative medicine which treats mechanical disorders of the musculoskeletal system
- Osteopathy, a system of alternative medicine that emphasizes physical manipulation of the body's muscle tissue and bones
- Sekkotsu, a traditional medical form of manual therapy and manipulation that was developed from the feudal era of Japan.
