= Regina Dal Cin =

Italian osteopath (1819–1897)

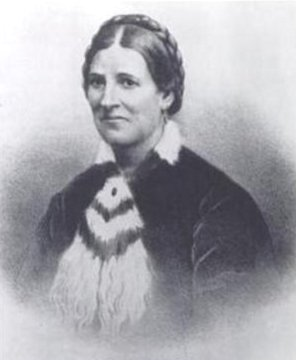
Regina Dal Cin

Regina Dal Cin (4 April 1819 – 15 August 1897) was an Italian osteopath, who practiced the recomposition of femoral dislocations. She is considered to be an expert in the reconstruction of the congenital and antiquated dislocations of the femur.

== Biography ==
Born as Regina Marchesini on 4 April 1819 in San Vendemiano, in the province of Treviso, northern Italy, Regina Dal Cin was the daughter of Lorenzo Marchesini and his wife Adriana Zandonella, a skilled "bone-dresser". Regina never went to school and devoted much of her time to improving her bone-setting techniques, learned from her mother.

At the age of 9, she started her career as a bone-setter by replacing her mother, who had broken her leg in a buggy accident.

At the invitation, she visited Venice, Vienna and Turin where she reconstructed the dislocated femurs, and treated even more serious cases at the local civic hospitals. Some of her bone-setting practices were witnessed by the illustrious surgeons at the time.

She faced four trials on the ground of not having the legal authorization to practice bone-setting, but she emerged victorious.

At the age of 18, she married Lorenzo Dal Cin. She was widowed early with a daughter.

A street in front of Palazzo Regina Dal Cin and a primary school were named after her by the municipality of Cappella Maggiore.

She died on 15 August 1897 in Cappella Maggiore.
