= Cappella Maggiore =

- Comune
- Comune di Cappella Maggiore
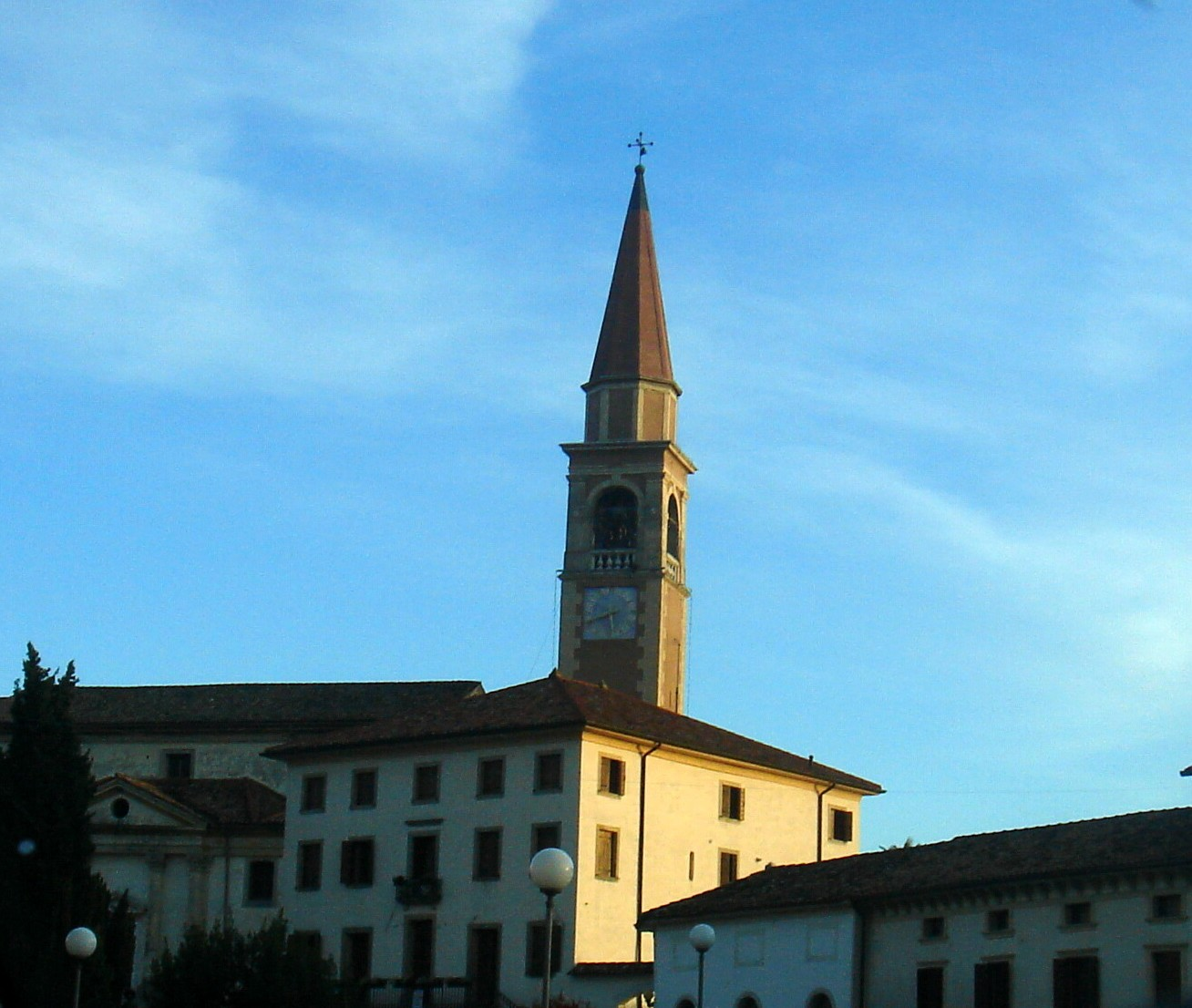
- Parish church.

- Location within Italy Location within Veneto
- Coordinates: 45°58′N 12°22′E
- Country: Italy
- Region: Veneto
- Province: Treviso (TV)
- Frazioni: Anzano

Government
  - Mayor: Vincenzo Traetta

Area
  - Total: 11.13 km^{2} (4.30 sq mi)
- Elevation: 115 m (377 ft)

Population (31 March 2017)
  - Total: 4,710
  - Density: 423/km^{2} (1,100/sq mi)
- Demonym: Cappellesi
- Time zone: UTC+1 (CET)
  - Summer (DST): UTC+2 (CEST)
- Postal code: 31012
- Dialing code: 0438
- Patron saint: Mary of Magdalene
- Saint day: 22 July
- Website: Official website

Cappella Maggiore is a comune in the province of Treviso, Veneto, northern-eastern Italy.

== Twinning ==
- (Scotland) Earlston, United Kingdom, since 2004

== Notable people ==
- Regina Dal Cin (1819–1897), osteopath and bone-setter
- Mario Dal Fabbro (1913–1990), furniture designer, sculptor, and author
