= Shizuto Masunaga =

Shizuto Masunaga (増永 静人, Masunaga Shizuto; 1925–1981) was a Japanese Shiatsu practitioner and author of books on Shiatsu.

== Biography ==
He was born in June 1925 in Kure, Hiroshima and graduated in psychology from Kyoto University in 1949. In 1959, he graduated from the Japan Shiatsu College and went on to teach psychology and shiatsu at the college. At the same time, he was professor of psychology at Tokyo University. Masunaga grew up in a family of shiatsu practitioners, with his mother having studied with Tamai Tempaku, originator of the term shiatsu and author of "Shiatsu Ho" ("finger pressure method"). He founded Zen Shiatsu and the Iokai Shiatsu Center school in Taitō. Masunaga is the author of Shiatsu (Japanese title), which became Zen Shiatsu when translated into English by Wataru Ohashi and published in North America and Europe in 1977. He also wrote several other Shiatsu books. He died at the age of 57 on July 7, 1981 of colorectal cancer.

== Selected works ==
- Shiatsu Therapy (指圧療法, 1970)
- Shiatsu (指圧, 1974)
- Health Method of Streaks and Key Points (スジとツボの健康法, 1975, second version published in 2010)
- ZEN SHIATSU (1977)
- Meridians and Shiatsu (経絡と指圧, 1983)
- Tales of 100 treatments: Stories of Zen Shiatsu (2021)
