= Mario Dal Fabbro =

Italian American sculptor, furniture designer, and author (1913–1990)

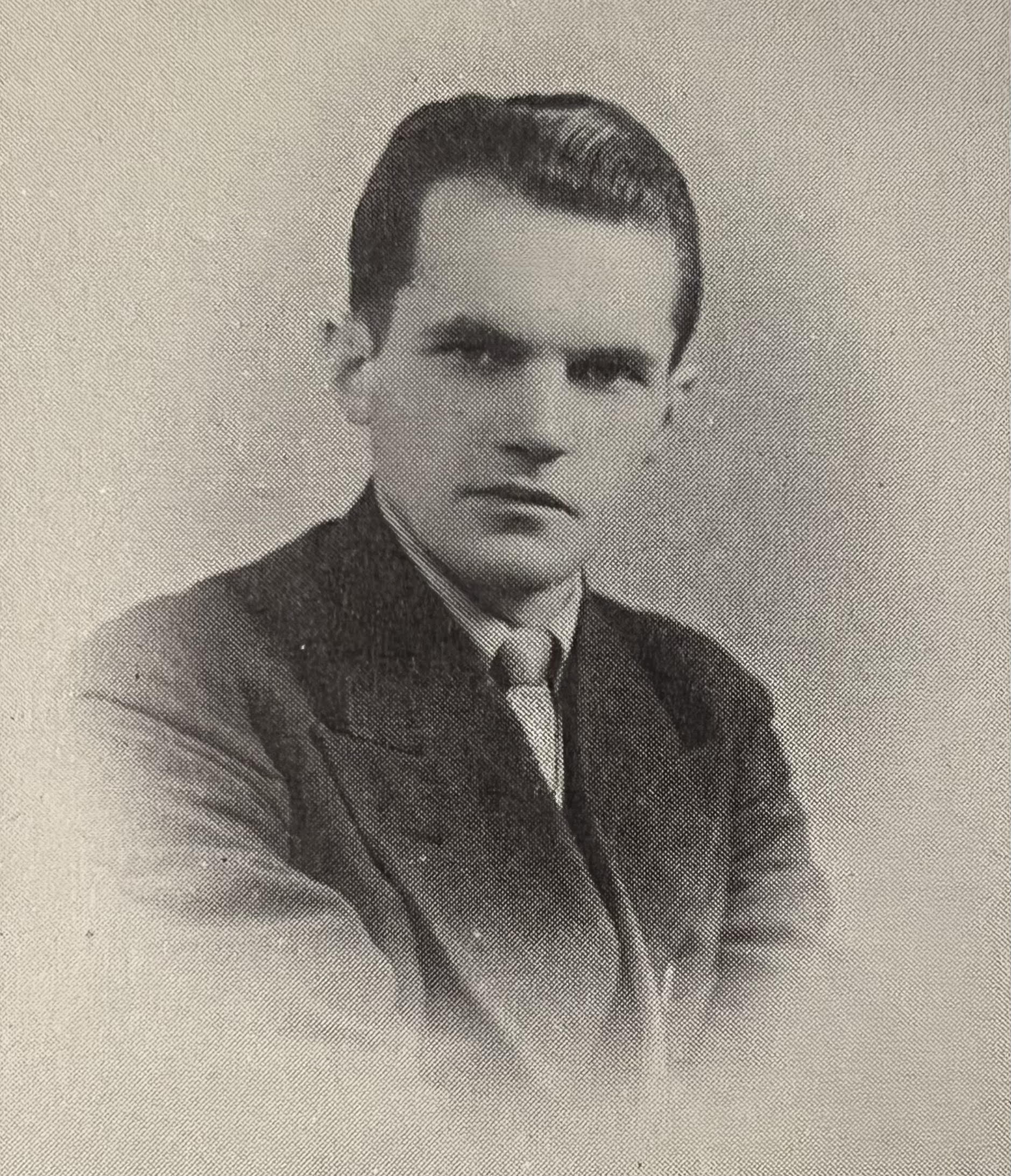
- Dal Fabbro in 1949
- Born: October 6, 1913; Cappella Maggiore, Veneto, Kingdom of Italy
- Died: June 20, 1990 (aged 76); Bridgeport, Connecticut, U.S.
- Education: Regio Magistero Artistico (Milan)
- Known for: Biokinetic wood sculptures, modernist furniture designs
- Movement: Modernism

Signature
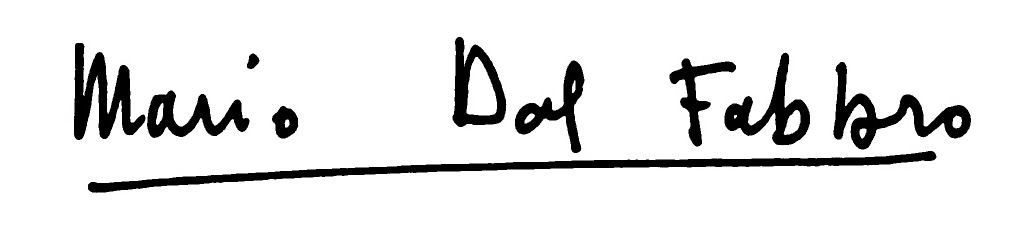

Mario Dal Fabbro (October 6, 1913 – June 20, 1990) was an Italian American modernist sculptor, furniture designer, and author of illustrated how-to books on furniture design and construction.

== Early life and education ==
Dal Fabbro was born in Cappella Maggiore in the Veneto region of Italy on October 6, 1913. His parents were Pietro and Luigia Fiorina (Gava) Dal Fabbro. In his youth, he worked in the family furniture shop. He studied art and design at the Royal Superior Institute for Industrial Arts in Venice and the Regio Magistero Artistico in Milan and graduated with high honors from the Institute in 1935 and Regio in 1937.

== Career ==
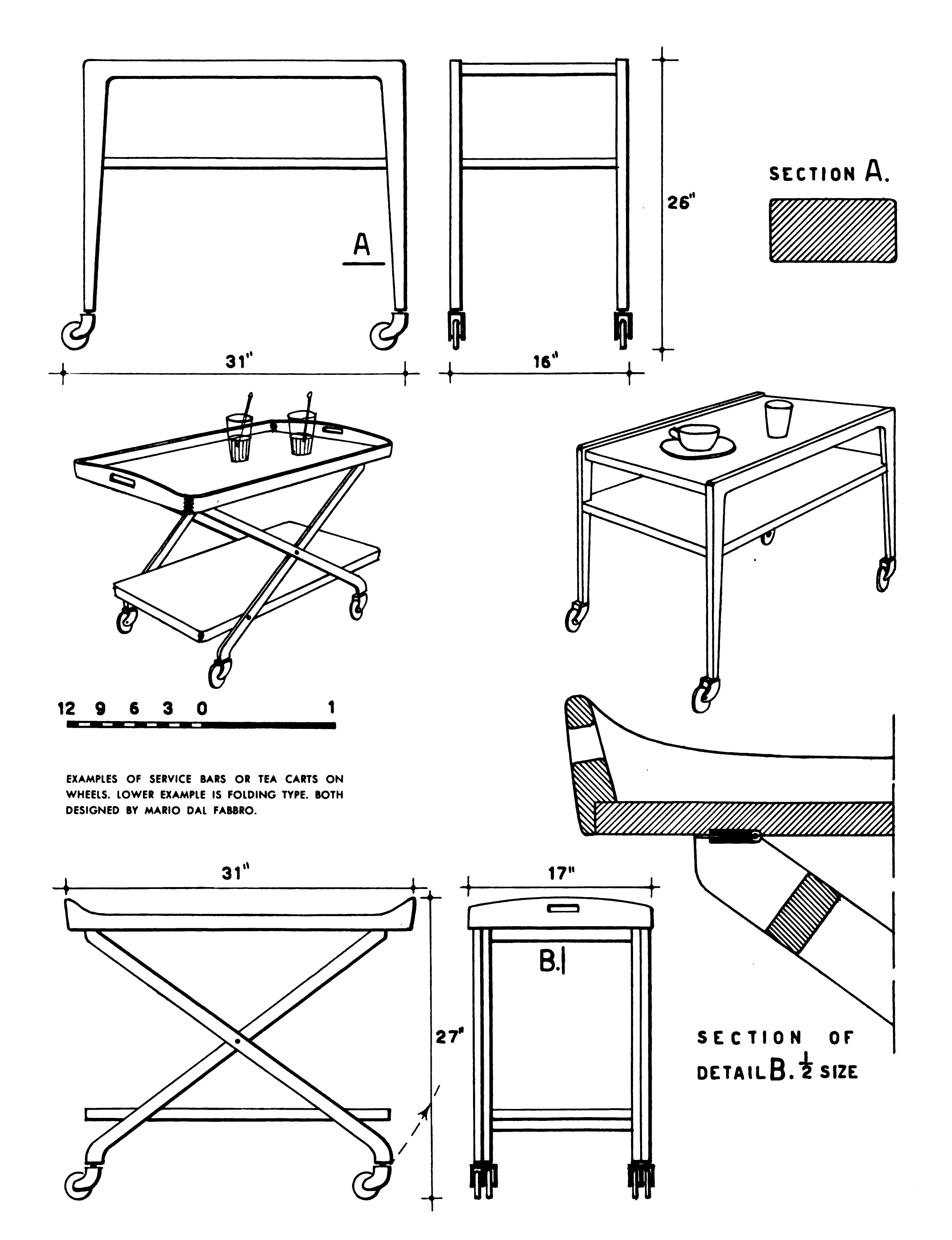
Diagrams of service bars or tea carts on wheels, designed by Mario Dal Fabbro (published in 1949)

Between 1938 and 1948, Dal Fabbro achieved recognition in Italy as an exponent of creative contemporary furniture design, designing pieces for private individuals and Milan furniture houses. He participated in the Triennale di Milano competition in 1939 and 1947 and won the Garzanti competition for the standardization of furniture. He contributed to the Italian design magazines Domus and Stile and the French architecture magazine L'Architecture d'Aujourd'hui. He also served in the Italian Army during World War II.

In 1948, Dal Fabbro immigrated to the United States, where he became an American citizen in 1951 and worked for 20 years as an industrial designer of furniture for Knoll and Paul McCobb and as a department head at JG Furniture in New York City and Allentown, Pennsylvania, where he resided from 1948 into the 1970s. His modernist designs were simple and practical with clean lines. In 1968, he retired from industry to become an independent sculptor, carving abstract organic forms and kinetic structures in wood. He exhibited his works at museums and galleries but never permitted them to be sold during his lifetime.

The Allentown Art Museum featured thirty of Dal Fabbro's works at a 1972 solo exhibition and added several to its permanent collections. The Kemerer Museum of Decorative Arts exhibited his work in 1976. His sculptures also have been exhibited at the Museum of Art, Science, and Industry in Bridgeport, Connecticut. In 2012, the New York gallery Maison Gerard exhibited works by Dal Fabbro and other artists "little known outside the collector's market but whose work is important and noteworthy today." Sotheby's, Christie's, Wright, and other prominent auction houses in New York and Chicago have sold his works.

In 1984, Dal Fabbro co-founded the Fairfield County Art Association in Fairfield, Connecticut. In 1986, Fairfield University honored him as Fairfield Artist of the Year. Established in 1976, this award has gone to artists and performers like Willem de Kooning, Gabor Peterdi, Brian Torff, Nicholas Rinaldi, and Tina Weymouth.

== Publications ==
After publishing several books on furniture design in Italy, Dal Fabbro published his first English-language book, Modern Furniture: Its Design and Construction with McGraw Hill in 1949. The title went through four printings and sold 15,000 copies within three years of publication. During the 1950s and 1960s, he published another dozen books, including How to Build Modern Furniture (1951), Furniture for Modern Interiors (1952), How to Make Built-in Furniture (1955), How to Make Children's Furniture and Play Equipment (1963), and Upholstered Furniture: Design and Construction (1969). McGraw Hill, John Murray, F. W. Dodge, Reinhold, Gorlich, and other presses published his books, which were released in Italy, Spain and England as well as the United States. He regularly contributed to The New York Times and House & Garden and wrote for Popular Science, McCall's, Mechanix Illustrated, and the Encyclopædia Britannica, coauthoring the section on furniture-making in a 1950s revision of the encyclopedia.

Aimed at hobbyists as well as professional designers, Dal Fabbro's books received praise in the popular press. Library Journal described his two-volume How to Build Modern Furniture as "invaluable reference material" with "easy to follow instructions." The New York Public Library included the title on a list of "one hundred best technical books." A 1950 review in American Artist said of Modern Furniture that "the hobbyist, or architect on a busman's holiday, will find many hours of diversion in the section on furniture he can build. It is also a serious reference book for the architect interested in modern design in furniture." A 1969 review in The Morning Call noted that Upholstered Furniture "meets needs of both the professional and the serious home craftsman." A 1954 review in the San Francisco Examiner praised Furniture for Modern Interiors for providing "a general, but inclusive view of what is northworthy among all the furniture produced in this country as well as elsewhere in the world. It avoids monotonous documentation, however." Dal Fabbro's book Furniture for Modern Interiors (1954) also received coverage in the Journal of the Royal Society of Arts and Design Quarterly.

== Personal life ==
Dal Fabbro married Allentown native Helen Rose (Dell Antonia) Dal Fabbro in Italy on May 9, 1944. The couple had one daughter.

He retired to Fairfield, Connecticut, and died in Bridgeport Hospital in Bridgeport, Connecticut, on June 20, 1990, at the age of 76. He was interred at the historic Oak Lawn Cemetery in Fairfield. Helen Dal Fabbro, who had died in July 1989, shared a burial plot with her husband.
