= Buteyko =

Buteyko or Buteiko (Cyrillic: Бутейко) is a gender-neutral Ukrainian surname that may refer to the following notable people:

- Anton Buteyko (1947–2019), Ukrainian diplomat
- Konstantin Buteyko (1923–2003), Ukrainian pulmonologist and creator of the Buteyko method for treatment of breathing disorders
