= Tokujiro Namikoshi =

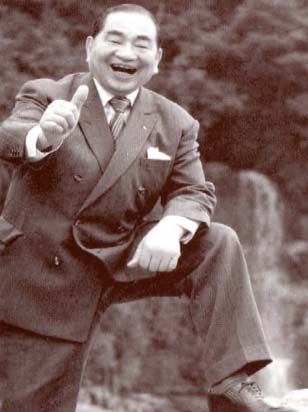
Tokujiro Namikoshi

Tokujiro Namikoshi (Japanese: 浪越 徳治郎, Hepburn: Namikoshi Tokujirō, 3 November 1905, Tadotsu, Kagawa Prefecture – 25 September 2000, Bunkyō, Tokyo) is the founder of Shiatsu therapy.
