= Shiatsu =

Type of Japanese pressure massage

- "Shiatsu" in new-style (shinjitai) kanji

Japanese name
- Shinjitai: 指圧
Transcriptions
- Romanization: Shiatsu

Shiatsu (/ʃiˈæts-, -ˈɑːtsuː/ shee-AT-, -AHT-soo; 指圧) is a form of Japanese bodywork based on concepts in traditional Chinese medicine such as qi meridians. Having been popularized in the twentieth century by Tokujiro Namikoshi (1905–2000), shiatsu derives from the older Japanese massage modality called anma.

There is no scientific evidence that shiatsu will prevent or cure any disease. Although it is considered a generally safe treatment — if sometimes painful — there have been reports of adverse health effects arising from its use, a few of them serious.

== Description ==
In the Japanese language, shiatsu means "finger pressure". Shiatsu techniques include massages with fingers, thumbs, elbows, knuckles, feet and palms, acupressure, assisted stretching, and joint manipulation and mobilization. To examine a patient, a shiatsu practitioner uses palpation, abdominal or Hara diagnosis and, sometimes, pulse diagnosis.

The Japanese Ministry of Health defines shiatsu as "a form of manipulation by thumbs, fingers and palms without the use of instruments, mechanical or otherwise, to apply pressure to the human skin to correct internal malfunctions, promote and maintain health, and treat specific diseases. The techniques used in shiatsu include stretching, holding, and most commonly, leaning body weight into various points along key channels."

The practice of shiatsu is based on the traditional Chinese concept of qi, which is sometimes described as an "energy flow". Qi is supposedly channeled through certain pathways in the human body, known as meridians, causing a variety of effects. Despite the fact that many practitioners use these ideas in explaining shiatsu, neither qi nor meridians exist as observable phenomena.

== Efficacy ==
There is no evidence that shiatsu is of any benefit in treating cancer or any other disease, though some evidence suggests it might help people feel more relaxed. In 2015, the Australian Government's Department of Health published the results of a review of alternative therapies that sought to determine if any were suitable for being covered by health insurance; shiatsu was one of 17 therapies evaluated for which no clear evidence of effectiveness was found. Accordingly, in 2017, the Australian government named shiatsu as a practice that would not qualify for insurance subsidy, to ensure the best use of insurance funds.

Shiatsu's claims of having a positive impact on a recipient's sense of vitality and well-being have to some extent been supported by studies where recipients reported improved relaxation, sleep, and lessened symptom severity. However, the state of the evidence on its efficacy for treating any malady is poor, and one recent systematic review did not find shiatsu to be effective for any particular health condition. It is generally considered safe, though some studies have reported negative effects after a treatment with shiatsu, and examples of serious health complications exist including one case of thrombosis, one embolism, and a documented injury from a "shiatsu-type massaging machine".

== History ==
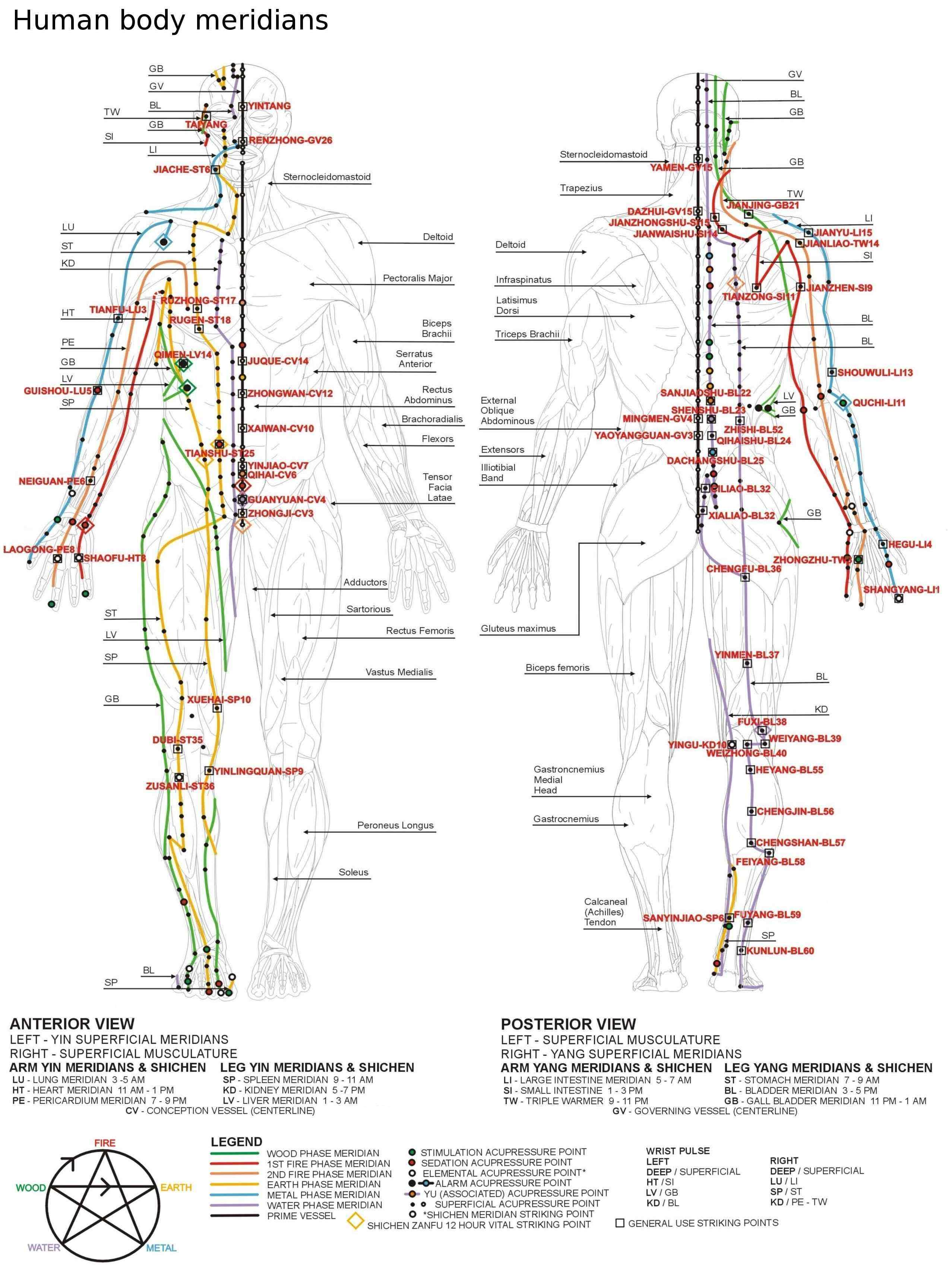
Shiatsu practitioners believe that an energy called ki flows through a network of meridians in the body.

Shiatsu evolved from anma, a Japanese style of massage developed in 1320 by Akashi Kan Ichi. Anma was popularised in the seventeenth century by acupuncturist Sugiyama Waichi, and around the same time the first books on the subject, including Fujibayashi Ryōhaku's (藤林良伯) Anma Tebiki (按摩手引 "Manual of Anma"), appeared.

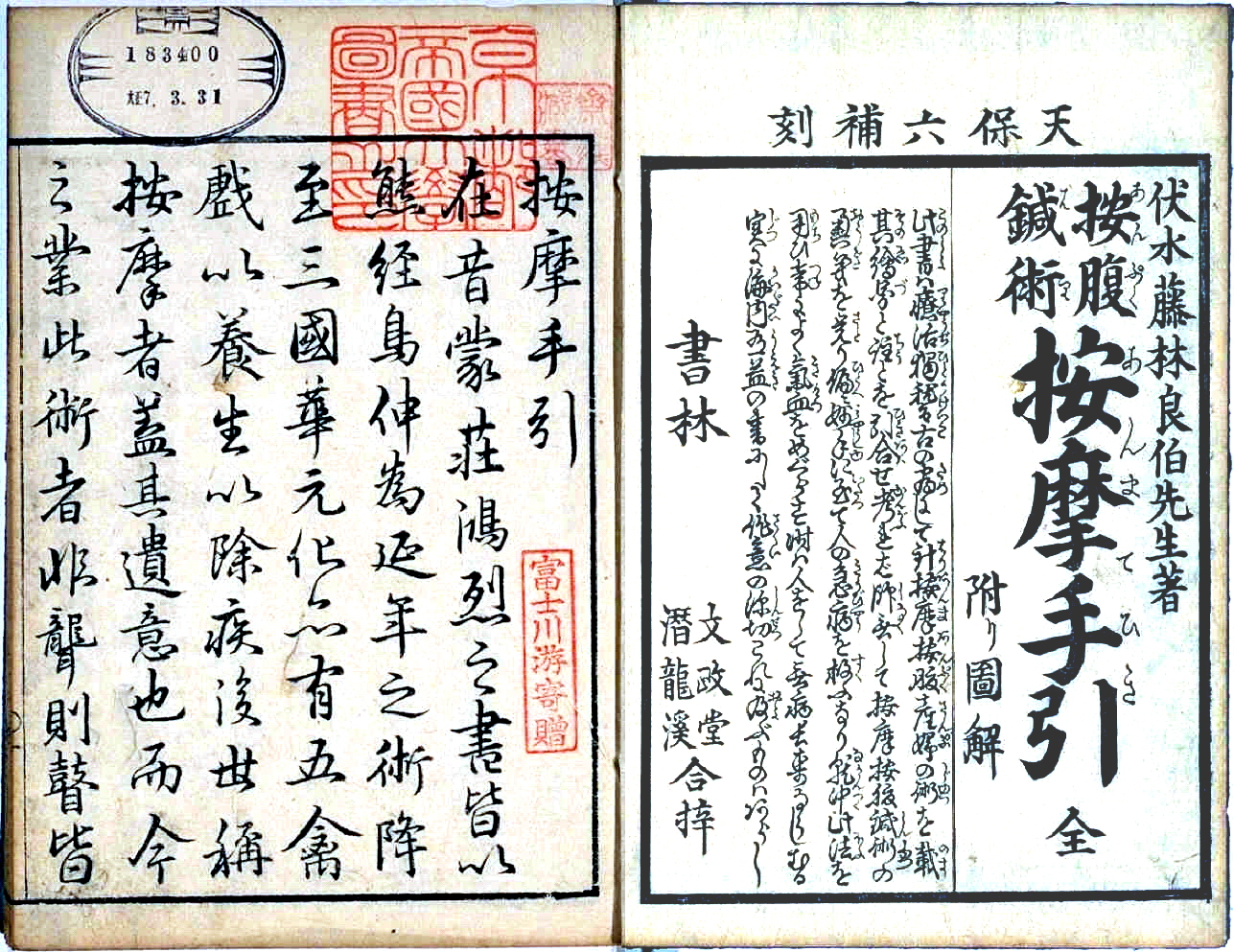
Introduction page, Anma Tebiki

The Fujibayashi school carried anma into the modern age. Prior to the emergence of shiatsu in Japan, masseurs were often nomadic, earning their keep in mobile massage capacities, and paying commissions to their referrers.

Since Sugiyama's time, massage in Japan had been strongly associated with the blind. Sugiyama, blind himself, established a number of medical schools for the blind which taught this practice. During the Tokugawa period, edicts were passed which made the practice of anma solely the preserve of the blind – sighted people were prohibited from practicing the art. As a result, the "blind anma" has become a popular trope in Japanese culture. This has continued into the modern era, with a large proportion of the Japanese blind community continuing to work in the profession.

Abdominal palpation as a Japanese diagnostic technique was developed by Shinsai Ota in the 17th century.

During the Occupation of Japan by the Allies after World War II, traditional medicine practices were banned (along with other aspects of traditional Japanese culture) by General MacArthur. The ban prevented a large proportion of Japan's blind community from earning a living. Many Japanese entreated for this ban to be rescinded. Additionally, writer and advocate for blind rights Helen Keller, on being made aware of the prohibition, interceded with the United States government; at her urging, the ban was rescinded.

Tokujiro Namikoshi (1905–2000) founded his shiatsu college in the 1940s and his legacy was the state recognition of shiatsu as an independent method of treatment in Japan. He is often credited with inventing modern shiatsu. However, the term shiatsu was already in use in 1919, when a book called Shiatsu Ho ("finger pressure method") was published by Tamai Tempaku. Also prior to Namikoshi's system, in 1925 the Shiatsu Therapists Association was founded, with the purpose of distancing shiatsu from anma massage.

Namikoshi's school taught shiatsu within a framework of western medical science. A student and teacher of Namikoshi's school, Shizuto Masunaga, brought to shiatsu a traditional eastern medicine and philosophic framework. Masunaga grew up in a family of shiatsu practitioners, with his mother having studied with Tamai Tempaku. He founded Zen Shiatsu and the Iokai Shiatsu Center school. Another student of Namikoshi, Hiroshi Nozaki founded the Hiron Shiatsu, a holistic technique of shiatsu that uses intuitive techniques and a spiritual approach to healing which identifies ways how to take responsibility for a healthy and happy life in the practitioner's own hands. It is practiced mainly in Switzerland, France and Italy, where its founder opened several schools.

== See also ==
- Acupressure
- Alternative cancer treatments
- Jin Shin Do
- Johrei
- Kampo
- Kappo
- Kiyoshi Ikenaga
- Macrobiotic diet
- Massage chair
- Onsen
- Reflexology
- Reiki
