= Six levels =

Theory in traditional Chinese medicine

In Traditional Chinese medicine, the Six Levels, Six Stages or Six divisions is a theory used to understand the pathogenesis of a illness through the critical thinking processes of inductive and deductive logic utilising the model of Yin and Yang. This theory originated from Shang Han Lun (translated into "On Cold Damage") by Zhang Zhongjing in 220 CE or about 1800 years ago.

== The Six Stages ==
The six stages are

- Tai Yang or Greater Yang
- Yang Ming or Bright Yang
- Shao Yang or Lesser Yang
- Tai Yin or Greater Yin
- Shao Yin or Lesser Yin
- Jue Yin or Terminal Yin

As can be seen the names of the levels are the same as the names of the head and foot pairs of acupuncture meridians. The order is roughly the order that a disease takes as you go from health to death. In some disease levels are skipped or the order can change.

=== Tai Yang stage ===
(related to Urinary bladder/Small intestine channels) is started when a person is exposed to an exterior cold pathogen through deficiency of way qi. The symptoms are Fever and maybe small chills, aversion to cold, pain in the back of the neck and head, Tongue has not yet changed, Pulse is floating. This stage has two sub stages.

1. Attack by wind.

2. Attack by cold.

3. Water Amassment

4. Blood amassment

Treatment in this stage to release the exterior (sweating)

=== Yang Ming stage ===
(related to the stomach and large intestine channels) has high fever, profuse sweating, aversion to heat, thirst, red face, restlessness. The tongue has a red body and dry coating. Pulse Rapid, flooding (until the fluids are injured, then it becomes xi (deficient) and rapid. This stage is called the 4 greats (great pulse, fever, great thirst, great sweat)

Treatment-clearing, draining

=== Shao Yang stage ===
(related to the San Jiao and Gallbladder channels) channel symptoms- loss of hearing, red eyes, dizziness, visual distortion, headaches and hypochondriac pain, alternating cold and hot. bowel symptoms-bitter taste, nausea or retching, irritability, anxiety Tongue-Thin, thin coat (that could be white or yellow) pulse-wiry

Treatment-Harmonize

=== Tai Yin ===
(related to Lung and Spleen) chronic watery diarrhea, vomiting, loss of appetite, no thirst, abdominal pain Tongue-white coating Pulse-xu (deficient) unless severe pain, then xu and wiry

Treatment-warm

=== Shao Yin ===
(related to the Heart and Kidneys) 2 subsections—constant fatigue in either situation Hot- fever, irritability, insomnia, dry mouth and throat, scanty and dark urine. This is a xu (deficient) heat, meaning the treatment is nourishing yin and not clearing heat

Cold-frequent urination with clear urine, cold extremities, aversion to cold, perhaps the body has aching joints and diarrhea. treatment method is warming and supportive.

Tongue-Red if hot pattern, pale if cold pattern Pulse-faint and weak -rapid with heat

=== Jue Yin ===
(related to the liver and pericardium channels)Primary symptoms-thirst, qi surging into chest with burning pain, hunger with no desire to eat, cold extremities. heat patterns-diarrhea with burning sensation, rectal heaviness, abdominal cramps, thirst or cold extremities with interior heat cold patterns- cold limbs, diarrhea with undigested food, vomiting, headaches on vertex, spasm Upper heat, lower cold-severe vomiting-case relates to roundworms

=== Traditional observations ===
In the ancient Chinese text called the Shang Han Lun (Cold Damage) theory, a traditional practitioner's goal was to guide the disease or ailment from one of Yin in the interior to Yang in the exterior. It was seen as long as the symptoms were moving toward the surface layers of Tai Yang, Shao Yang or Yang Ming the patient was on the path to recovery and that the illness was leaving the body. The term traditionally is called "Yin disease turning into Yang. (Chinese;Yīn Bìng Zhuǎn Yáng, 阴病转阳), an example of this within this traditional theory was as a cold pathogen was pushed from the deep interior (Yin) back out to the active, warm exterior (Yang), it was observed to frequently transforms into heat. The patient might briefly experience high fever or intense thirst (a Yang Ming presentation) right before the illness leaves the body entirely.
