= Sugiyama Waichi =

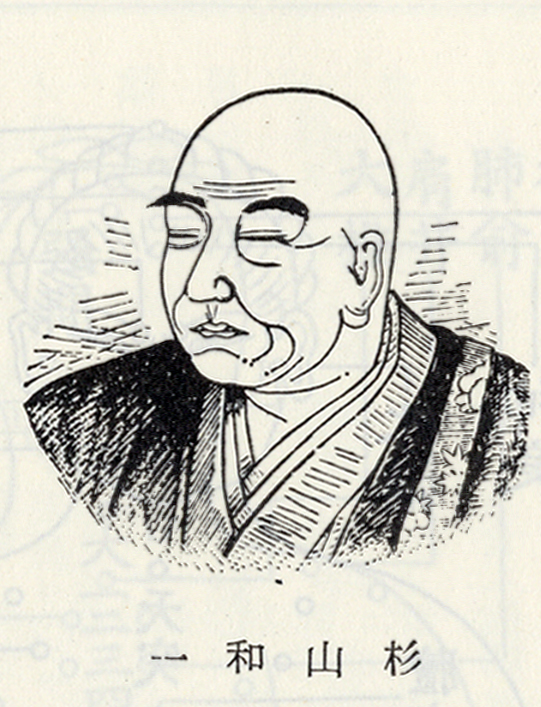
Sugiyama Waichi

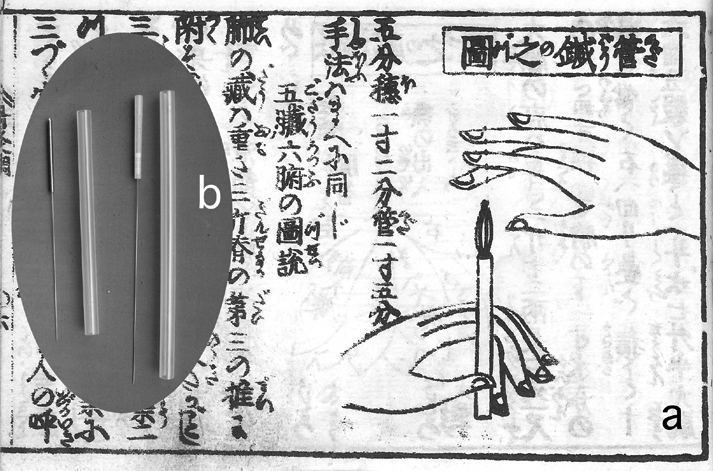
Traditional and modern Japanese guiding tube needles

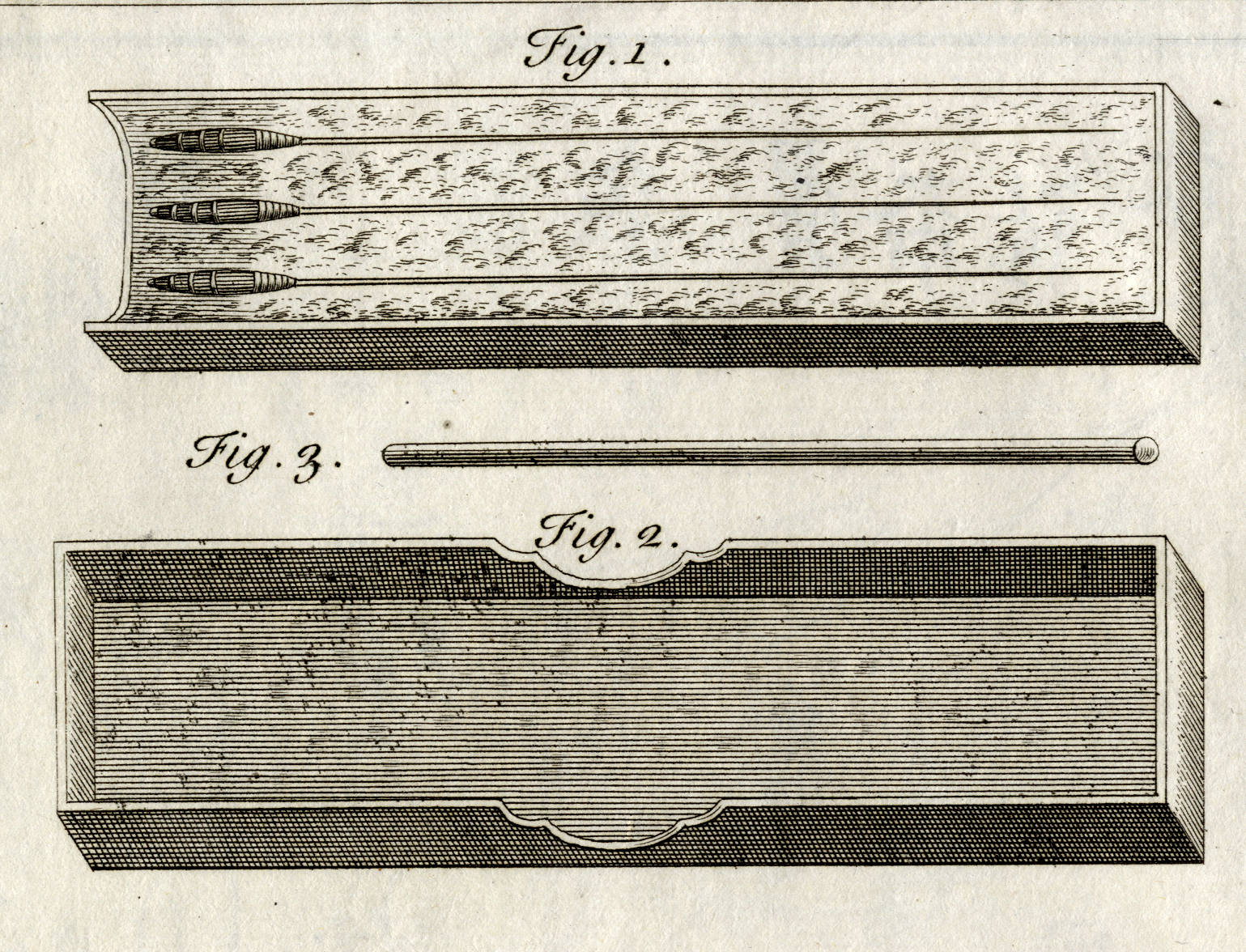
Sugiyama-style guiding tube (shinkan) and needles in Engelbert Kaempfer "The History of Japan" (London, 1727).

Sugiyama Waichi (1614–1694) was a Japanese acupuncturist, widely regarded as the "Father of Japanese Acupuncture".

An eye-disease in infancy blinded Sugiyama from a very early age. At the age of ten he moved from Kyoto to Edo (Tokyo) to study massage and other therapeutic techniques under Ryomei Irie, one of the most famous medical practitioners of the era. His apprenticeship was short; Irie quickly dismissing him as "dull". On his way back to Kyoto, Sugiyama fasted and prayed for 100 days in a Cave, where he reputedly discovered the secret of the shinkan ("insertion tube") after pricking himself on a needle wrapped in a leaf.

His development of the shinkan, combined with his use of extremely fine gold and silver needles, allowed for comparatively painless acupuncture, and resulted in considerable expansion of the art; for this reason he is often referred to as the "father of Japanese acupuncture". He started around forty-five schools teaching massage and acupuncture to other blind people, resulting in the prevalent association in Japan between blindness and physical therapy. After Sugiyama effected a cure for a neurotic disease afflicting shōgun Tokugawa Tsunayoshi his work received official state endorsement, which greatly increased the popularity of his schools.

Sugiyama's grave can be found in the graveyard of the Miroku-Temple in Tokyo (Sumida-ku).

Sugiyama's teachings were recorded by his disciples and printed for the first time in 1880: Ryōji no taigaishū, Senshin no yōshū, and Igaku setsuyōshū.

Much of Japanese acupuncture has been influenced by the Chinese medical Classics called the Nan Jing (Eighty-One Difficult Issues) and the Shanghan Lun (Treatise on Cold Damage Diseases) These two classics lay the foundation for the development of Fukushin or Hara diagnosis that has become the main differentiationonal diagnostic tool between Chinese and Japanese medicine.
