= Manase Dōsan =

Japanese physician and anatomist (1507–1594)

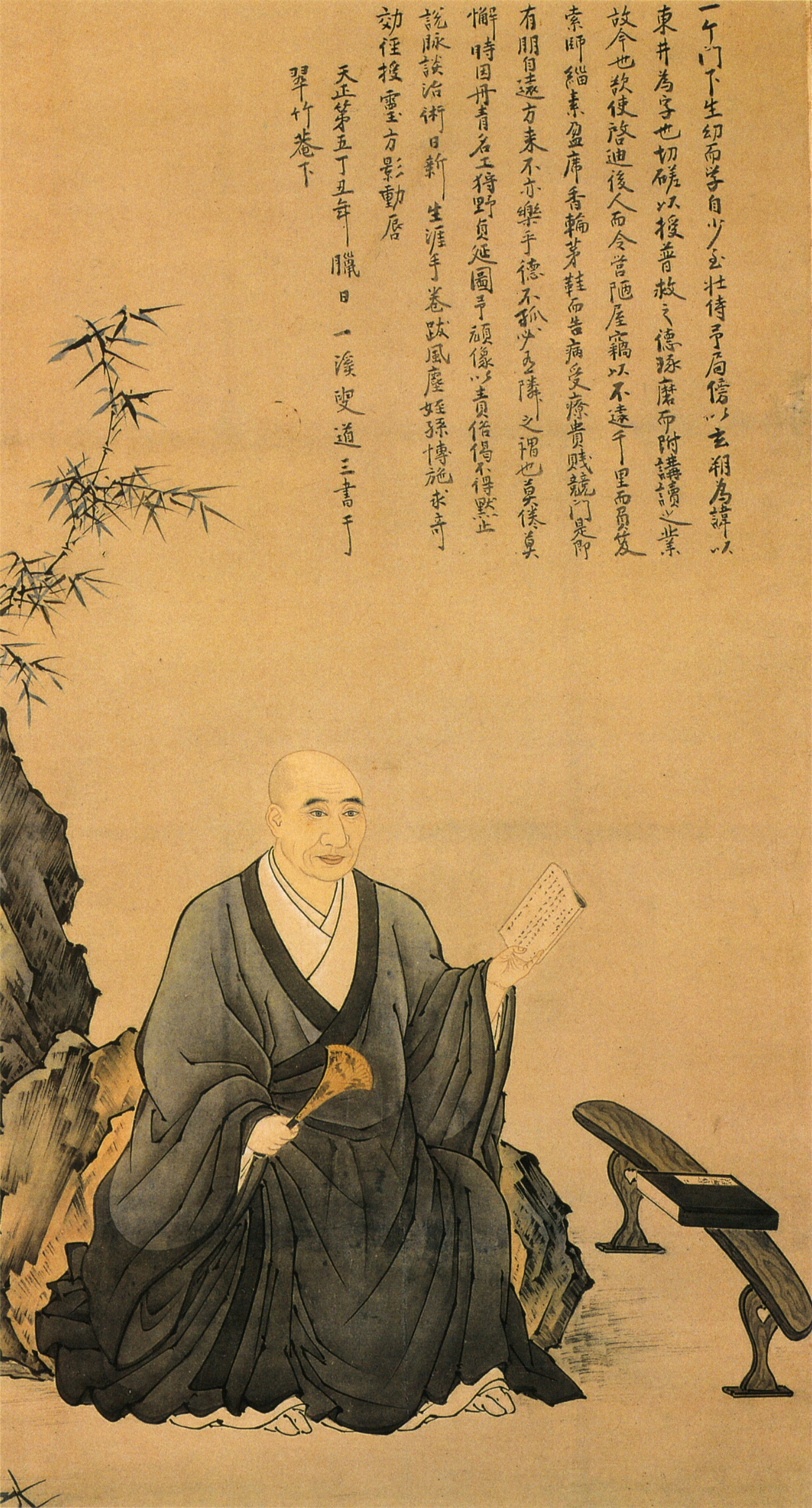

Manase Dōsan (曲直瀬 道三; 1507–1594) was a Japanese physician and anatomist.

== Early life and education ==
Dōsan was born in Kyoto and initially trained to become a monk. However, in his early twenties he began studying medicine under Tashiro Sanki. He enrolled at the Ashikaga School of Medicine, and continued his studies for 17 years.

== Career ==
He published a medical textbook, the Keitekishū (啓迪集), in 1571, and worked as a doctor for many daimyō of the time. He was employed by the shōgun Ashikaga Yoshiteru and treated the Emperor Ōgimachi. The daimyō Dōsan treated included Mōri Motonari, whom Dōsan attended in 1566 during his siege of Toda Castle. When Monotari visited him the following year, Dōsan presented him with nine rules for health, known as the Kyuki. These were:

- Do not be lazy or negligent
- Drink, live and eat modestly
- Enjoy poetry and dancing in moderation
- Rule virtuously
- Be mindful of war, but do not love it
- Listen to all viewpoints
- Note the difference between the lax and the industrious
- Court wise men and eschew extravagance
- Moderation in rule is reflected by moderation in the ruled

That same year, he also visited Matsunaga Danjō Hisahide, where he lectured on Chinese texts on sex and the nurturing of life.

Dōsan taught over 3,000 students in what became known as Dōsan-ryu or the Dōsan School. He and his heirs (both natural and adopted) were instrumental in the spread of the Goseihō school of medical thought in Japan, which stemmed from Chinese systems of medicine.

== In popular culture ==
In the light novel Honnōji kara Hajimeru Nobunaga to no Tenka Tōitsu series, when Makoto suddenly developed a high fever from excessive exhaustion, Manase Dosan was immediately summoned by Oda Nobunaga to treat him and saved his life.
