= Nan Jing (Chinese medicine) =

The Huangdi Bashiyi Nanjing (Chinese: 黃帝八十一難經; lit. 'The Yellow Emperor's Canon of Eighty-One Difficult Issues'), often referred to simply as the Nan jing, is one of the classics of traditional Chinese medicine (TCM).

Compiled in China during the first century C.E., the Nan jing is so named because its 81 chapters seek to clarify enigmatic statements made in the Huangdi Neijing. Along with being a foundational text in traditional Chinese medicine, it is used extensively for study and reference in Japanese acupuncture and traditional Japanese medicine (TJM).
