= Anma =

Japanese massage

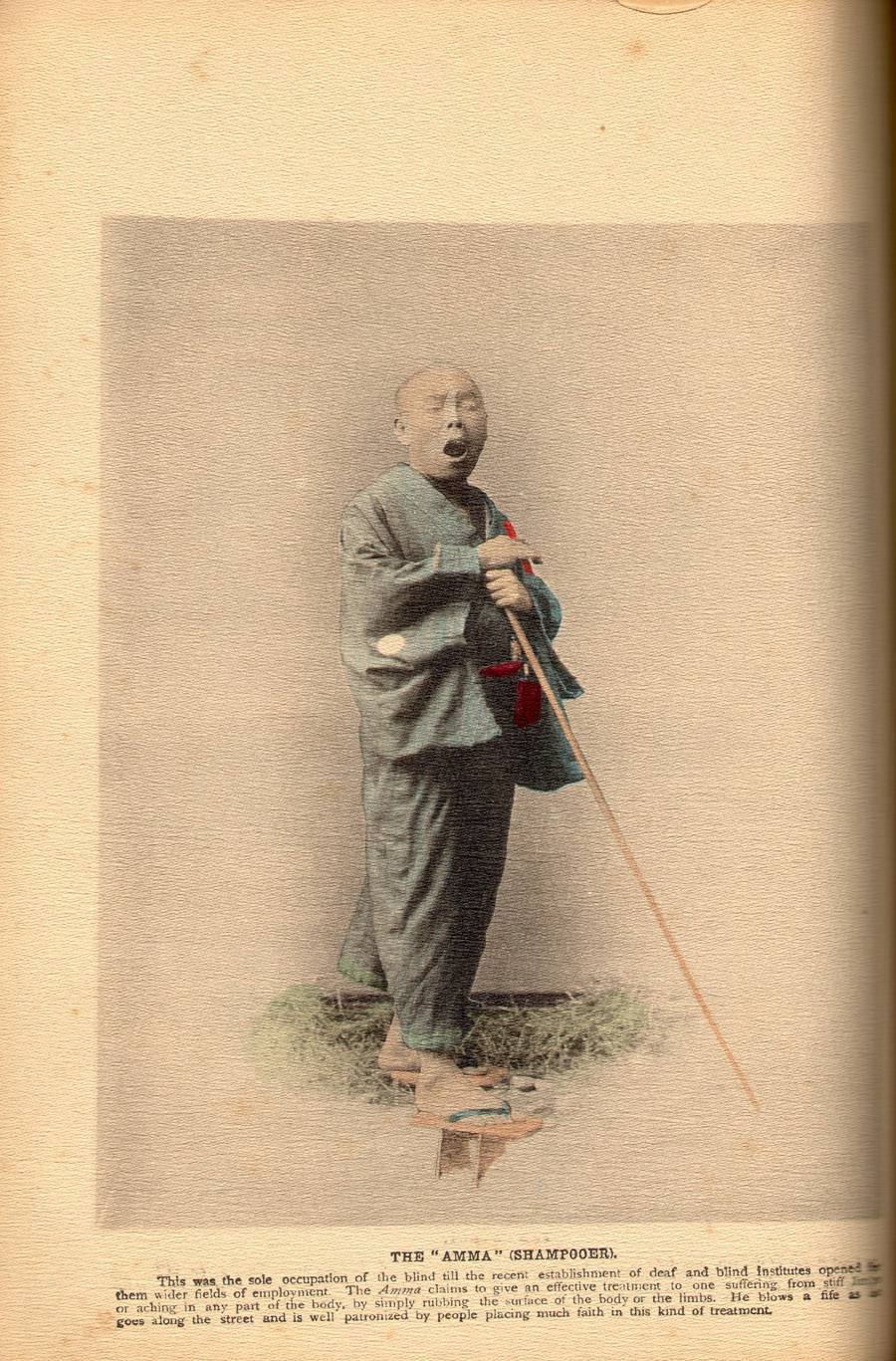
A photograph of a typical Meiji-era anma

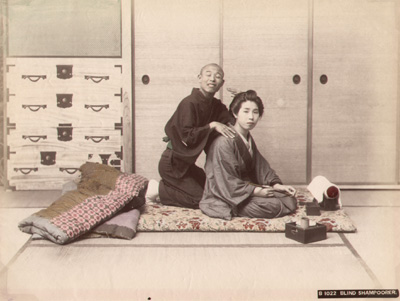
A blind practitioner and a woman. As well as musicians, the anma practitioners were the popular occupation of the blind till the establishment of deaf and blind institutes opened in the 1870s, which granted them wider fields of employment.

Anma (Japanese: 按摩) is a practice of traditional Japanese massage; the word also refers to practitioners of that art. Modern shiatsu is largely derived from anma.

== History ==
Anma is thought to be of Chinese origin, developing from Tui Na. Tui Na techniques arrived in Japan during the Nara period (710–793 CE), along with other techniques of traditional Chinese medicine, and were practiced in government-sponsored hospitals. Anma as a unique system was founded in 1320 by Akashi Kan Ichi.

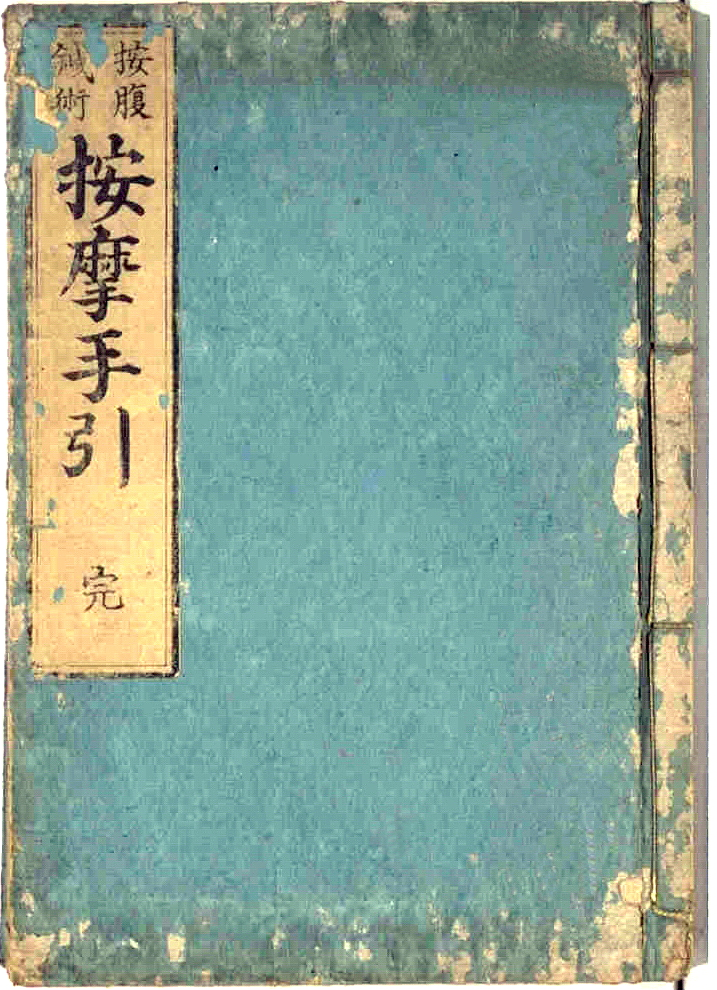
The cover of Anma Tebiki

Anma was popularised in the seventeenth century by acupuncturist Sugiyama Waichi, and around the same time the first books on the subject, including Fujibayashi Ryōhaku's (藤林良伯) Anma Tebiki (按摩手引 "Manual of Anma"), appeared. The Fujibayashi school is the foundation of modern anma. Anma (masseurs) were often nomadic, earning their keep in mobile massage capacities, and paying commissions to their referrers. In the nineteenth century, the image of anma suffered somewhat from an association with the ukiyo lifestyle of urban Japan, and it was subsequently less well-regarded as a therapy.

During the Meiji period, the appearance of Western medicine reduced anma's prominence still further. Many of its techniques were subsumed into shiatsu and Western massage practices, although research into anma for medical purposes continues at Tokyo Kyoiku University. Anma is still practiced independently of shiatsu in Japan, with practitioners being certified by the health board of their local prefecture.

== Blind practitioners ==
Since Sugiyama's time, anma has been strongly associated with the blind. Sugiyama, blind himself, established a number of medical schools for the blind which taught this practice. During the Tokugawa period, edicts were passed which made the practice of anma solely the preserve of the blind – sighted people were prohibited from practicing the art. As a result, the "blind anma" has become a popular trope in Japanese culture. This has continued into the modern era, with a large proportion of the Japanese blind community continuing to work in the profession.

During the occupation of Japan by the Allies after World War II, the practice of anma was banned (along with other aspects of traditional Japanese culture) by General MacArthur. The ban prevented a large proportion of Japan's blind community from earning a living. Writer and advocate for blind rights Helen Keller, on being made aware of the prohibition, interceded with the United States government; at her urging, the ban was rescinded.

In recent years the fictional character of Zatoichi, the blind swordsman, has brought the concept of the "blind anma" into the public eye in the West. Blind anma are also commonly used to comedic effect in Japanese cinema.

== Techniques ==
Anma practices uses common massage techniques such as kneading, rubbing, tapping and shaking. These activities are directed at specific vital points and meridians on the body. The seven traditional techniques are: pressing/stroking, grasping/kneading, strengthening, compressing, vibrating, tapping and "hand music". In addition, methods of abdominal palpitation (按腹 anpuku), developed by Shinsai Ota in the seventeenth century, are used. It is considered quite a vigorous form of massage, with gripping movements intended to increase blood flow to the muscles and deep tissues, and forceful acupressure techniques applied with the knuckles. The treatment is usually performed through the clothing, rather than directly on the skin.
