= Laurence Andrewe =

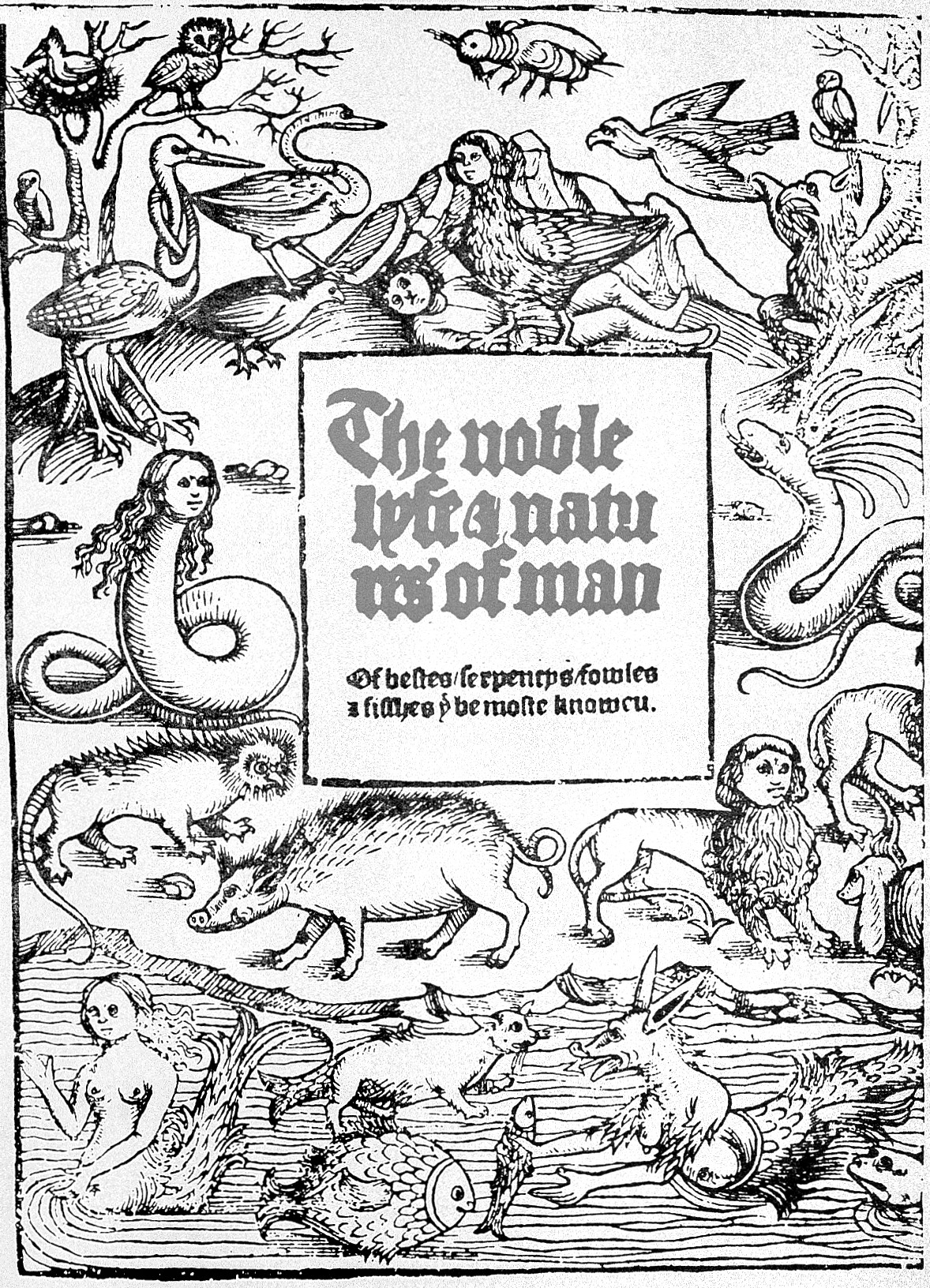
Noble Lyfe and Nature of man

Laurence Andrewe (fl. 1510–1537), was a translator and printer. He was from Calais, then controlled by the English. He translated parts of a Dutch edition of the anonymous work Hortus Sanitatis in 1510 as ‘The noble life and natures of man, of besets, serpent's, fowles & fishes, yt be made known [col.] Translated be me Laurens Andrewe of the towne of Calis, in the famous cite of Andwarpe. Emprented be me John of Doesborowe [n.d.]’ folio (Hazlitt's Coll. and Notes, 1876, p. 474). He probably learned the art of printing from Jan van Doesborch or Peter Treveris (Ames's Typ. Ant. ed. Herbert, i.412), and practised for some time in London in Fleet Street, at the Golden Cross by Fleet Bridge (now Ludgate Circus).

There, in 1527, he printed his own translation of ‘The vertuose boke of Distyllacion of the waters of all maner of Herbes by Jherom Bruynswyke, and now newly translate out of Duyche,’ sm. folio. He appears to have translated other minor works which have not come down to us, as in the Prologue he observes: ‘After dyvers and sondry small volumes and tryfeles of myrth and pastaunce some newly composed, some translated and of late finished, [I am] now mynded to exercise my pene in mater to the reader some what more profitable.’ The book contains many woodcut illustrations of distilling apparatus with interesting figures and descriptions of plants.

It is this work which has given Andrewe the credit of producing an edition of the Grete Herball in 1527. He also printed, without a date, ‘The myrrour & dyscrypcion of the World,’ folio, a reproduction of the 1481 text of Caxton, with some of the original wood blocks. Herbert (Typ. Ant. iii.1786) says: ‘I have a fragment of Æsop's Fables, bound with his Myrrour, which seems to have been also printed by him.’ Another undated production of his press was ‘The Directory of Conscience,’ 4to. A work entitled ‘The Valuacion of Golde and Siluer. Made in the famous city of Antwarpe and newly translated into Englishe by me Laurens Andrewe … Emprentyd in the famous city of Andwarpe,’ without date or printer, is placed by Ames (Herbert's edition, i.412), who does not, however, appear to have seen it, at 1537, with the remark: ‘Mr. Oldis supposed as he was a printer it might be printed by him, but then he must have been at Antwerp at that time.’ Another edition of a similar work is given by Herbert (p. 1529) as of 1499, and described precisely. Although not an original author, Andrewe deserves consideration as one of the earliest of those who translated into English works on scientific subjects.
