= Jan van Doesborch =

Dutch printer, illustrator, and author (1470/1480–1536)

- Occupation(s): Engraver, author, printer, publisher, bookseller

Jan van Doesborch (c. 1470/80 – Utrecht, 1536), also known as Jan van Doesborgh, John of Doesborch or John of Doesborowe, was a Dutch author, bookseller, printer, engraver, publisher and translator. During the course of his career as a printer and bookseller during the period roughly between 1502 and 1532, he published at least sixty books in various genres, including works of prose fiction, jest books, medieval legend, practical handbooks, and colonial travelogues. These books were mainly printed in either Dutch or English.

Jan van Doesborch's life is poorly documented. No archives have been preserved from the fifteenth century, with the result that we do not know when or where he was born, from what class or milieu he came, what his marital status was, or what education he received. Presumably he learned the printing profession from the Antwerp printer Roland vanden Dorpe, whose company and inventory he took over from his widow around 1501 or 1502 after his death. Traditionally, his year of birth is estimated circa 1470, but around 1480 is equally possible. In any case, he mastered English and French well enough to be able to translate into and out of those languages. He likely had some knowledge of Latin and possibly Greek. The first recorded appearance of his name is in 1508, in the archive of the Antwerp Guild of Saint Luke, in which he was registered as an illuminator and engraver.

In 1523 Doesborch was apparently in England, as his name can be found as "Johanne van Dwysborow" in the Tax Records of the parish church of St Martin-in-the-Fields in London. That Doesborch had some ties to the English printing and bookselling trades is also evidenced by his printing of a handful of books in English and by his apparent ties to the London bookseller Laurence Andrewe. Scholars of the history of printing have also suggested that Doesborch's publications exerted a considerable influence on the English book market. R. Maslen for instance posits that: "If William Caxton and Wynkyn de Worde had a more obvious influence on a wider range of literary genres, van Doesborch and his translators—who included the Englishman Laurence Andrewe—may be said to have shaped the entire course of English prose fiction in the sixteenth century." Ben Parsons has likewise stated: "Van Doesborch may even be termed a literary dictator, as his publications set the tone of the English book market for a number of years."

It is clear that Jan van Doesborch tried to print books for a contemporary market of interested readers. In numerous instances he compiled thematic books, in which he incorporated fragments of texts he had previously published: the books The nine drunkards, Der nine quaetsten, and That bedroch der vrouwen include overlapping materials, for instance. In the last two titles, he mixed stories from the Bible and the classical world with new translations from the famous Burgundian collection of short stories Les cent nouvelles nouvelles (ca. 1464 – 1467). Similarly, his books Of the newe landes, Die reyse van Lissebone, Van der nieuwer werelt, and the broadside De novo mondo incorporate the source material of Balthasar Sprenger's account of his participation in the Seventh Portuguese India Armada of 1505–06, a mercantile expedition from Lisbon to the eastern coast of Africa and India.

Another notable aspect of the books printed by Doesborch is the abundance of woodcut illustrations that appear in them. For this reason, Doesborch's books are of some art-historical interest today.

The primary typeface used by Doesborch for printing his books is similar or identical to that used by Jacobus de Breda, Henrik de Lettersnider, R. van den Dorpe, and Henrik Eckert in the fifteenth, and by almost every printer in the Netherlands in the sixteenth century.

The Utrecht Buurkerk records state that he died (and was buried) there in 1536.

== Works published by Van Doesborch ==
The following bibliography of books printed by Van Doesborch has been established by Piet Franssen. Most of the titles are also recorded by Proctor in his 1894 monograph Jan van Doesborgh, printer at Antwerp. An essay in bibliography. This list may not be exhaustive. Titles of which no surviving copies are believed to be extant are in brackets.

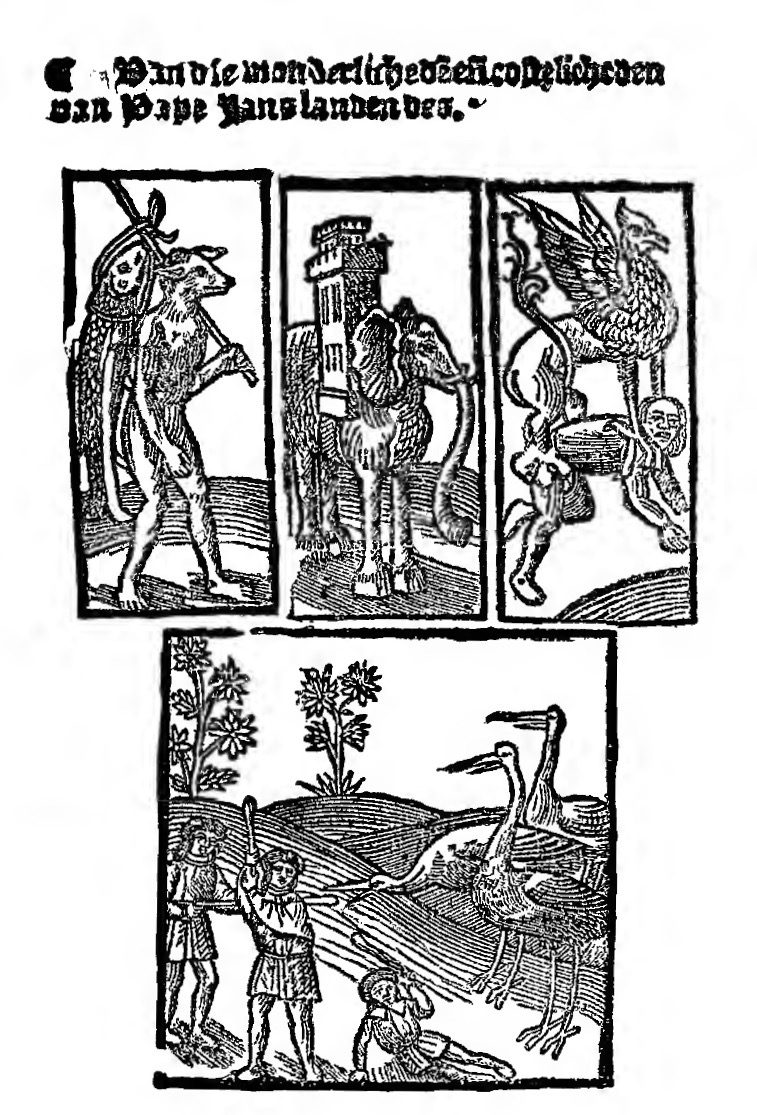
Title page for Van Pape Jans Landen (c. 1506), printed and published in Antwerp by Jan van Doesborch.

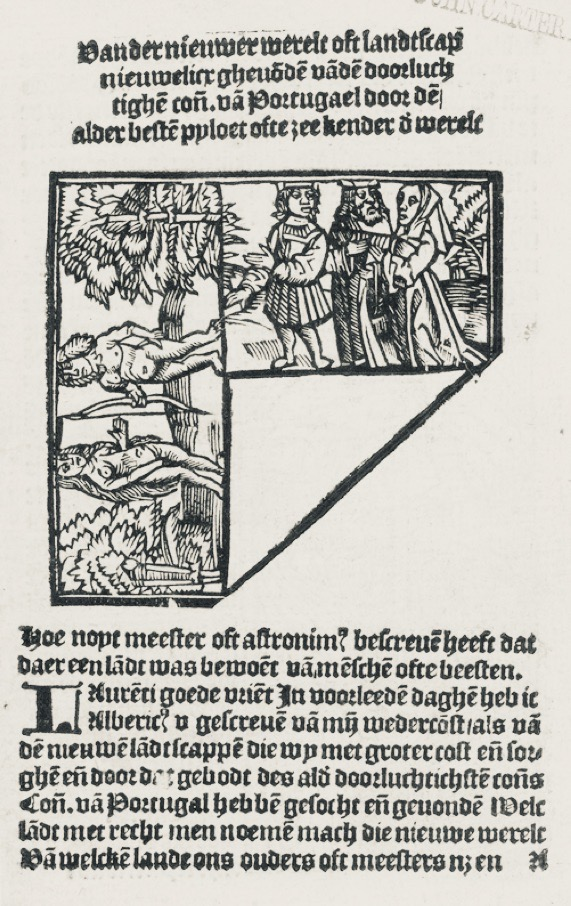
Title page of Van der nieuwer werelt (ca. 1507)

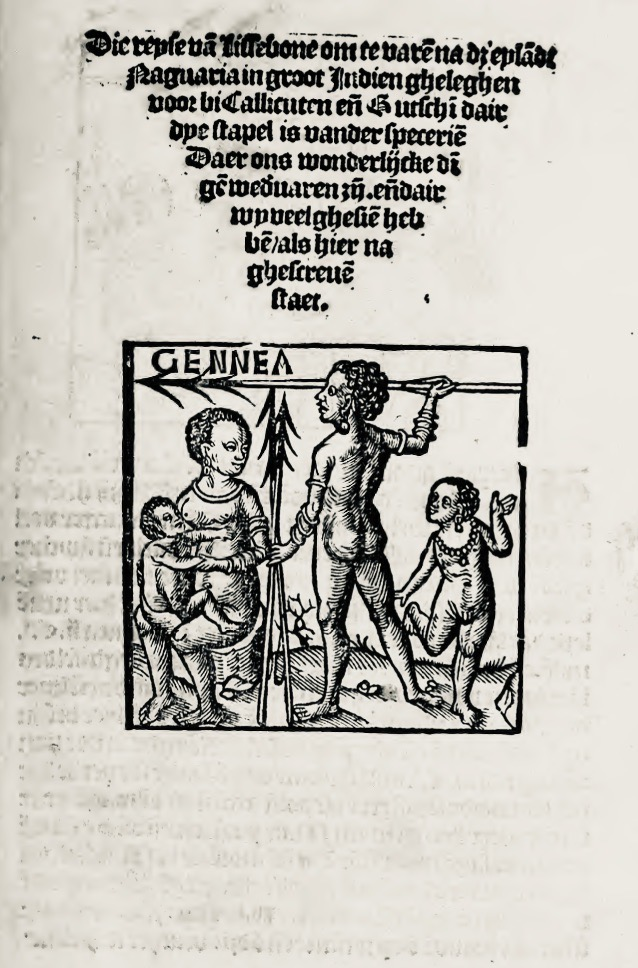
Title page of Die reyse van Lissebone (1508)

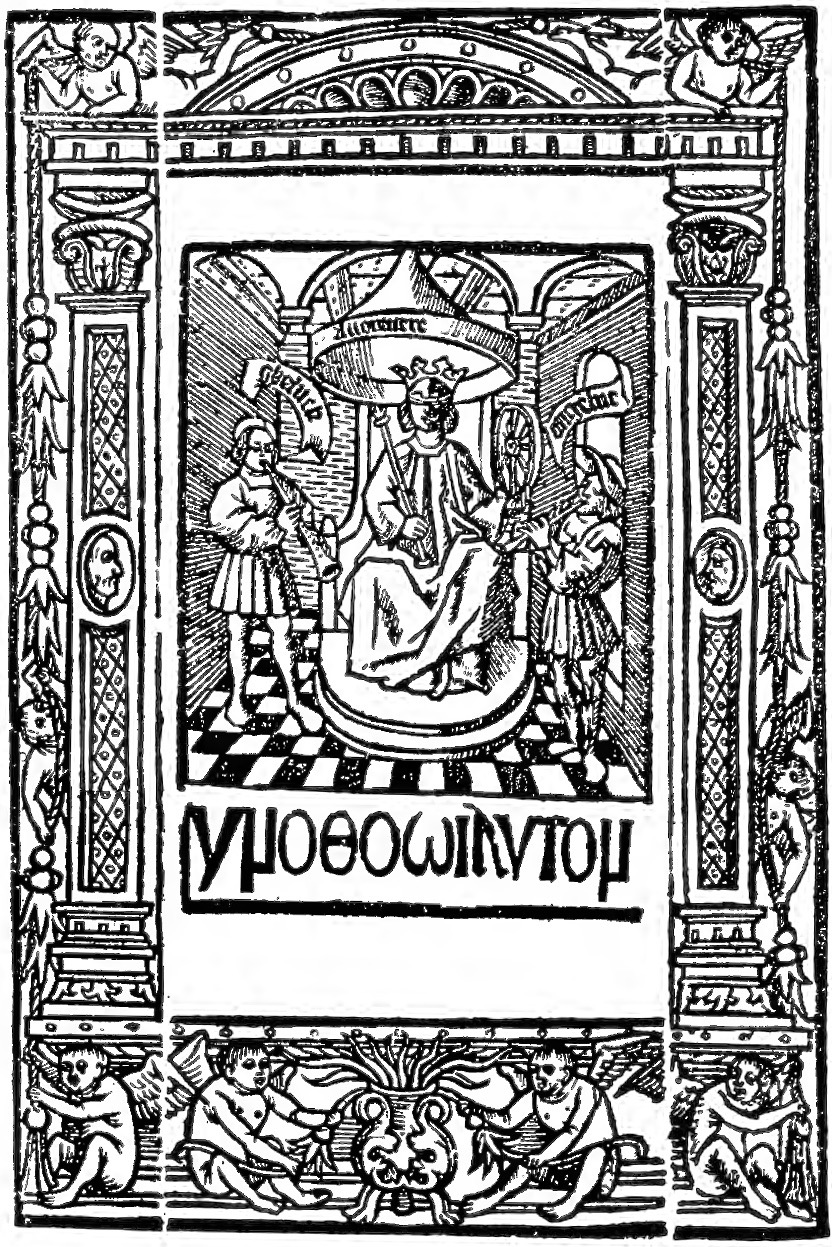
Printer's device from the Oorspronck (c. 1517) of Jan van Doesborch, depicting a throne room with sovereign, attendants, enclosed by an elaborate ornamental border

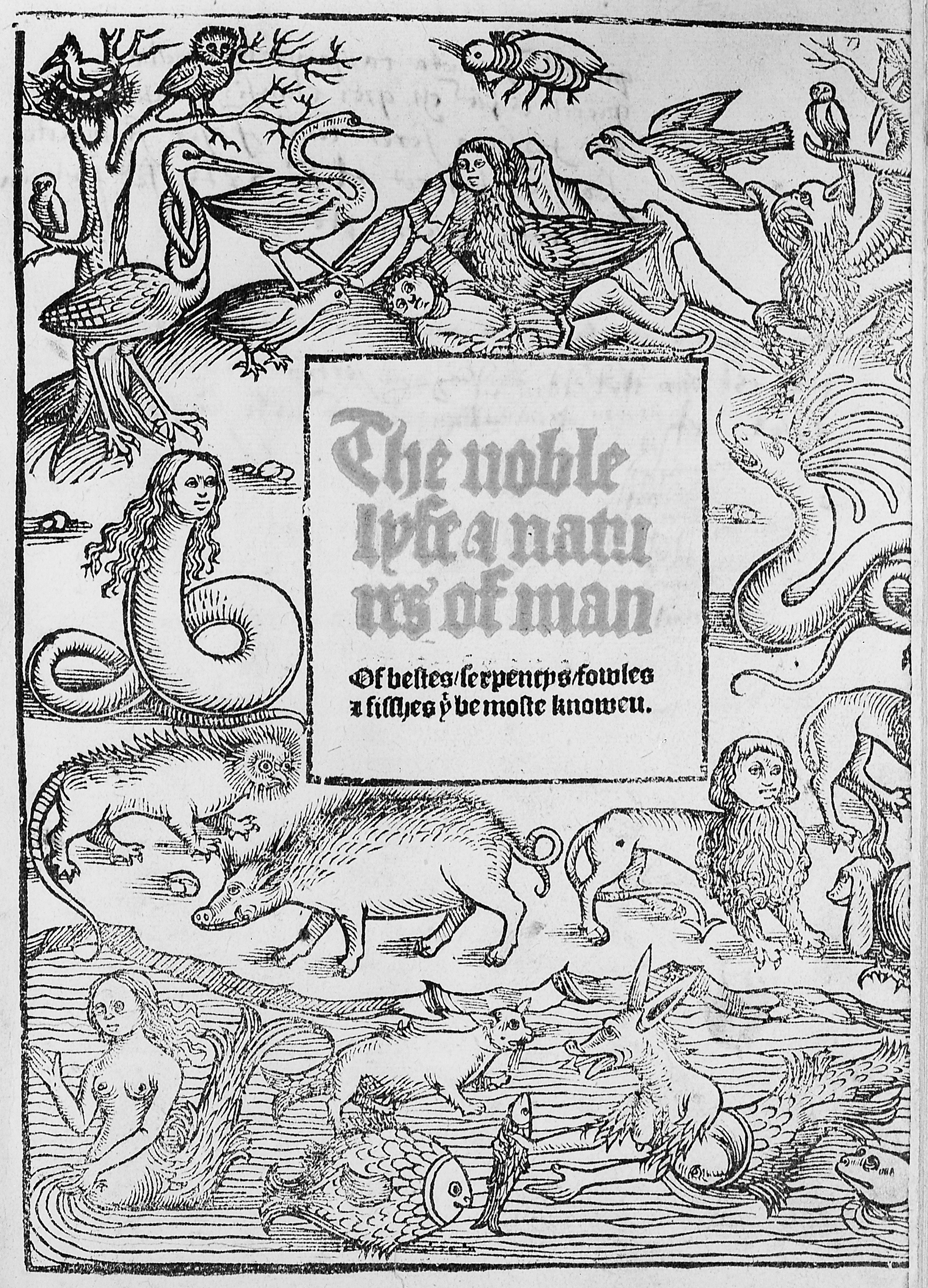
Title page of The noble lyfe & natures of man, circa 1521

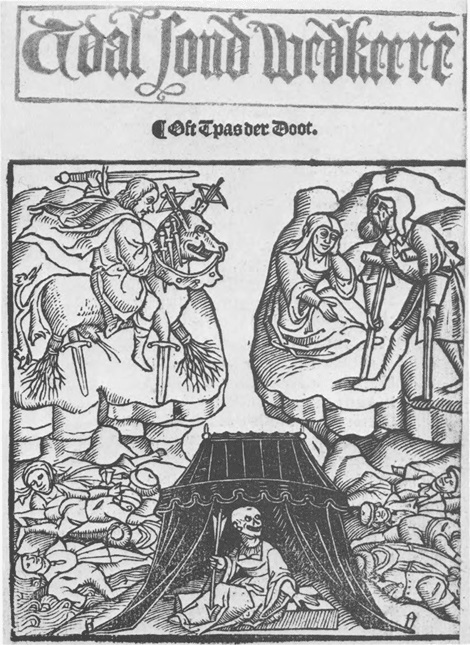
Title page of Tdal sonder wederkeeren, 1528

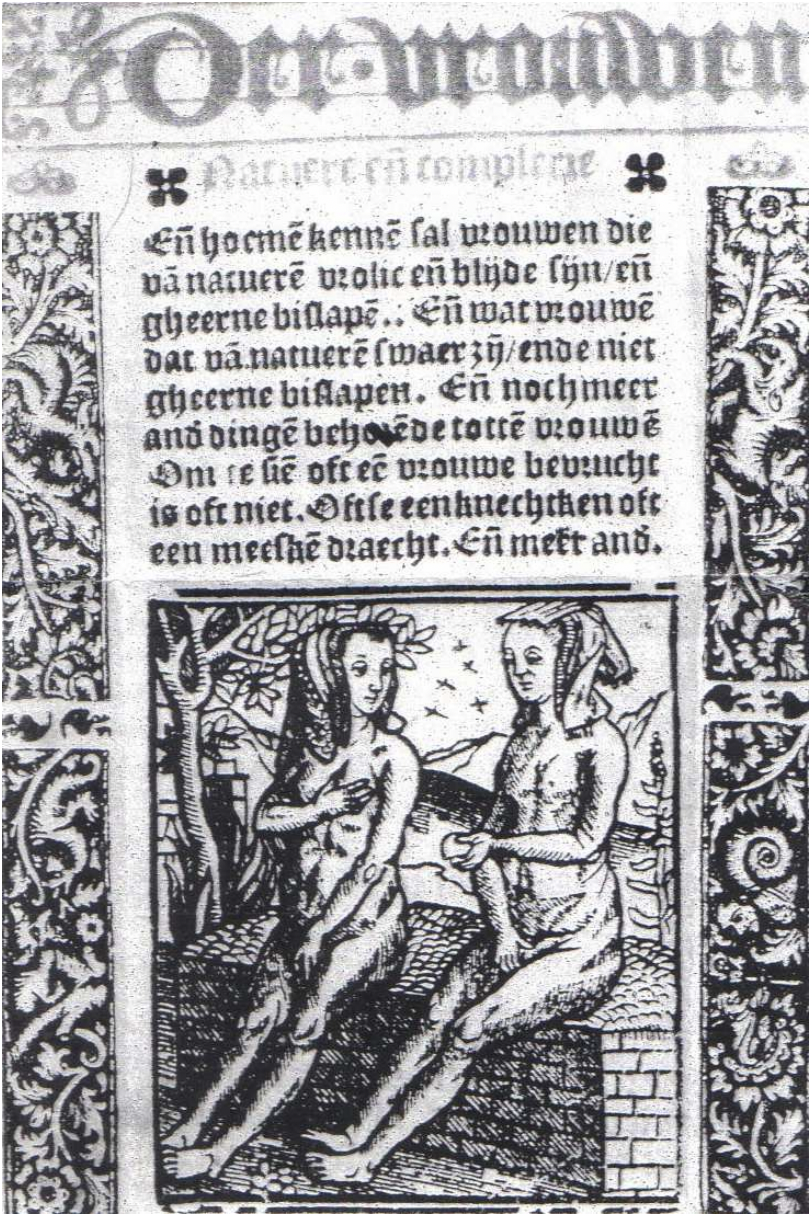
Title page of Der vrouwen natuere ende complexie, 1531

Published in Antwerp:

- Vijfthien vreesselijke teekenen (ca. 1502)
- Valuacyon of golde and sylver of 1499 (ca. 1503)
- The fifteen tokens (ca. 1503) | EEBO-TCP transcription
- [Van den leven ende voerganc des [...] Antekerst (ca. 1504)]
- Die historie van Buevijne van Austoen (1504)
- Van pape Jans landen (ca. 1506) | Digital copy at Google Books
- Van den ghedinghe tusschen eenen coopman ende eenen jode (ca. 1505 - 1510)
- Van der nieuwer werelt (ca. 1507) | Digital copy at Wikimedia
- Distructie van Troyen (before dec. 1508)
- Die reyse van Lissebone (1508) | Digital copy at Archive.org
- Long accidence (Latin grammar book, ca. 1509)
- [De novo mondo (broadsheet, ca. 1510) | Digital copy of 1927 edition at Delpher
- Of the newe landes (ca. 1510 - 1511) | EEBO-TCP transcription
- Dat regiment der ghesontheyt (ca. 1510)
- Die [...] cronijke van Brabant, Hollant, Seelant, Vlaenderen (oct. 1512)
- [Ulenspiegel (1511–1516)]
- [Howleglas (1511–1518)]
- [Merlijn (1511–1515)]
- Historie van den ridder metter swane (ca. 1512 – 1515)
- [Historie van Mariken van Nieumeghen (before 1515)]
- Pronosticacion of the yere 1516 (1515)
- Short accidence (Latin grammar book, ca. 1515)
- [Broeder Russche (ca. 1516)]
- [Friar Rusch (ca. 1516)]
- [Alexander van Mets (ca. 1516)]
- Tghevecht van minnen (1516) | Digital copy at Dutch Library
- Den oorspronck onser salicheyt (1517) | Digital copy at Google Books
- Causes that be proponed in a consultacyon of a journey to be made agaynst the Turkes (1517)
- [Van Floris ende Blancefloer] (ca. 1517)
- [De negen dronkaards (1517–1523)]
- Thuys der fortunen ende dat huys der doot (1518)
- Die [...] cronike van Brabant, Vlaenderen, Hollant, Zeelant (1518)
- [Frederick van Jenuen (1518)]
- Story of Lorde Frederycke of Jennen (1518)
- Copy of the letter etc. (1518)
- [Een nyeu seer schoon ende profitelijck plantboecxken (ca. 1518)]
- [Virgilius, Van zijn leven ende doot (ca. 1518)]
- Virgilius. Of the lyfe of Virgilius and of his deth (ca. 1518)
- Story of Mary of Nemmegen (ca. 1518)
- Die bibele int corte (ca. 1518 – 1519)
- [Den groten herbarius (ca. 1518 – 1520)]
- Der dieren palleys (1520) | Digital copy at Google Books
- The noble lyfe and natures of man (ca. 1521) | Digital copy at the Wellcome Library
- [De pastoor van Kalenberg (ca. 1521)]
- The parson of Kalenborowe (ca. 1521)
- [Profetie sibille van Tiburtina (ca. 1521 – 1522)]
- Van Jason ende Hercules (1521)
- Die historie van den stercken Hercules (1521)
- Warachtighe prognosticatie... totten jare 1524 (1522)
- [Dat hantwerck der cirurgien (before 1525)]
- [Die distellacien ende virtuyten der wateren (before 1527)
- Der .ix. quaesten (1528)
- Tdal sonder wederkeeren (1528) van Colijn Caillieu
- [Dat bedroch der vrouwen] (ca. 1528 – 1530)]
- [The deceyte of women (ca. 1528 – 1530)]
- [Het bedrog der mannen (na 1528)]
- Refreynen (ca. 1529) | Digital copy of 1939 reprint at Delpher
- Van Brabant die excellente cronike (1530) | Digital copy at the Wellcome Library
- Cronycke van Hollandt, Zeeland, ende Vrieslant (1530)

Published in Utrecht:

- [Van den .x. esels (ca. 1531)]
- Der vrouwen natuere ende complexie (1531) | Digital edition at Utrecht University (2009 thesis)
- Den groten herbarlus (1532)
- Int paradijs van Venus (ca. 1532)
