= Grete Herball =

Early Modern encyclopedia

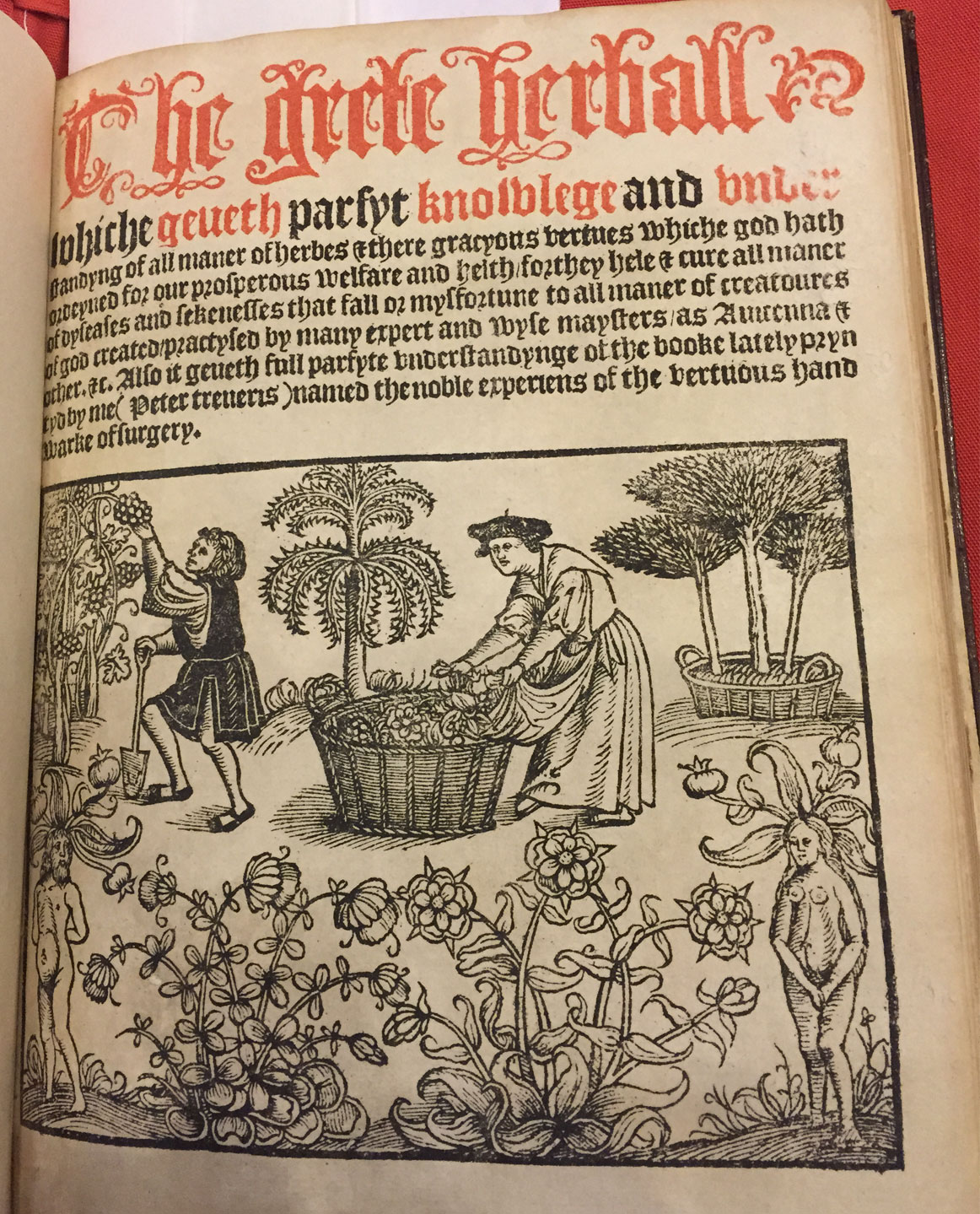
Title page with frontispiece of garden scene, from 1526 edition printed by Peter Treveris

The Grete Herball (The Great Herbal) is an Early Modern encyclopedia and the first illustrated herbal produced in English. It is preceded by Richard Banckes's unillustrated Herball (1525), which was the first printed English herbal ever produced. The Grete Herball is a single volume compendium which details the medicinal properties (or virtues) of plants and some non-botanical items according to the system of humoralism. Confirmed editions were printed between 1526 and 1561, with many still in existence today. Its full title is "The grete herball: whiche geueth parfyt knowlege and under standyng of all maner of herbes & there gracyous vertues whiche god hath ordeyned for our prosperous welfare and helth: for they hele & cure all maner of dyseases and sekenesses that fall or mysfortune to all maner of creatoures of god created: practysed by many expert and wyse maysters, as Aucienna & other &c."

== Origins ==
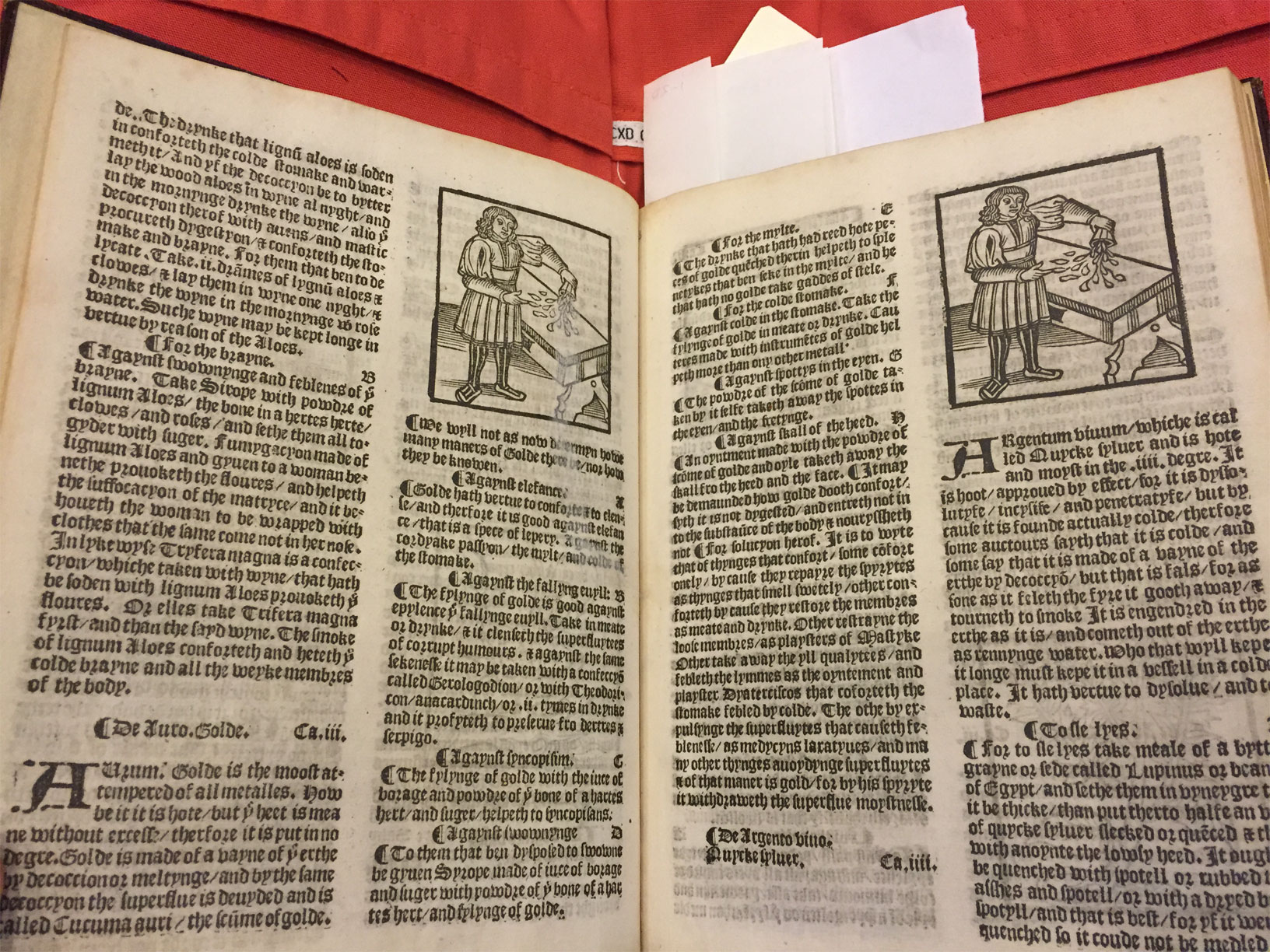
Pages showing multiple use of the same woodcut and repairs, Grete Herball, 1526

=== Text ===
Like most medieval and early modern herbals, the Grete Herball is made up of information taken from earlier works. This literary tradition can be traced back to the second millennium b.c.e., but the number of herbals grew most in the thirteenth century. De Materia Medica (Περὶ ὕλης ἰατρικῆς) of the 1st century Pedanius Dioscorides is considered one of the most important encyclopedias of plant knowledge from the time, but herbals became numerous and wholesale lifting of information common and expected. Authors and printers borrowed freely, often without the addition of any original content. Instead, the Grete Herball is considered the only known translation from French of Le Grant Herbier (1498). Like contemporary herbals, Le Grant Herbier exhibits heavy borrowing. Over half of its chapters are lifted from Circa instans, a Salernitan work created between approximately 1130 and 1150. Later botanists, such as William Turner and Nicholas Culpeper, would begin to break this tradition and put their own observations, research, and theories into their herbals alongside older knowledge. Turner was disdainful of previous efforts, it is believed he is referring to the Grete Herball when he states "...as yet there was no English Herbal but one, all full of unlearned cacographees (bad spelling) and falsely naming of herbs..." in the preface to his own Herbal (1568).

=== Images ===
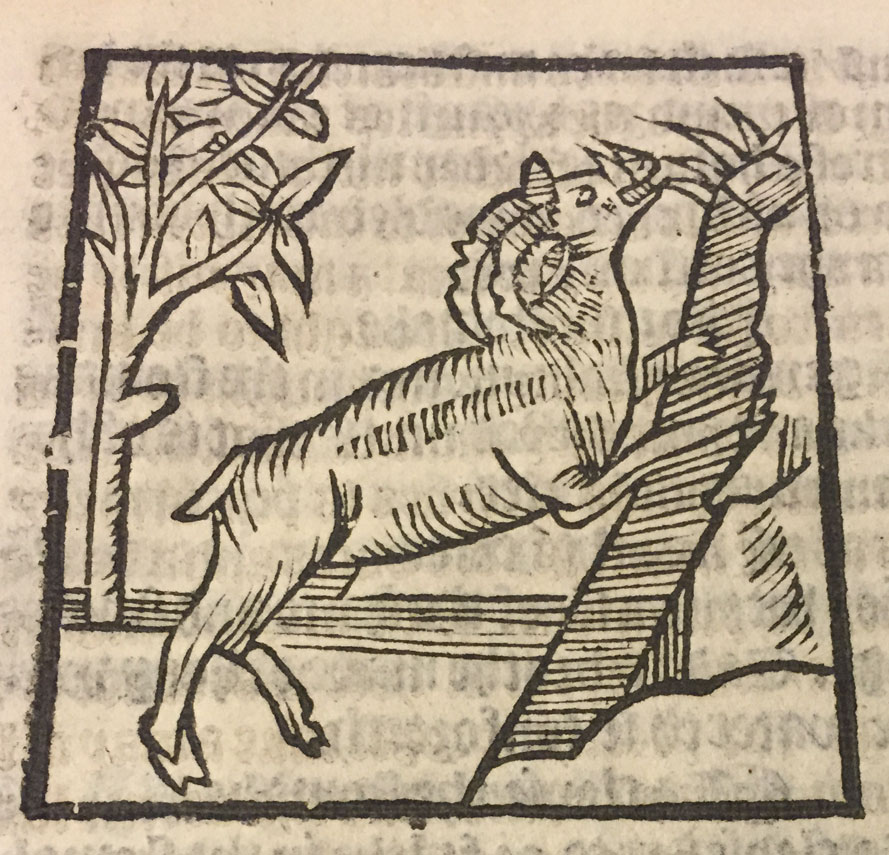
Woodcut image, Grete Herball, 1526

Similarly, the Grete Herball's numerous woodcuts are taken from Le Grant Herbier, but like the text these images are not original to the French Herbier. They are in fact copies of a series of woodcuts which first appeared in the German Herbarius zu Teutsch (also known as Der Gart). In the Grete Herball the same woodcut image is often reused for multiple entries. By most accounts, these images became much degraded between their original use in Herbarius and their subsequent recycling in the Grete Herball. Woodcuts were expensive to acquire, and like other printers of his time Peter Treveris would reuse them in later books. One such book is "The vertuose boke of Distillacyon of the waters of all maner of Herbes (1527), translated by Laurence Andrew from the Liber de arte distillandi by Hieronymus Braunschweig, [which] is illustrated with cuts from the same wood-blocks as the Grete Herball."

== Print history ==
=== Format ===
The book is printed in a double column format with black letter typeface and contains a variety of woodcuts depicting plants, animals, people, and garden scenes. Though the order varies by edition, many feature a list of chapters at the beginning and an index at the end. The Grete Herball contains extensive information on plant life as well as entries on animals, comestibles, and minerals. Each entry features an image of the plant or item, its Latin name, any known alternate names, its humoral categorization, any associated folklore, a list of its medical and practical applications, and instructions for use. Editions and surviving copies vary in length. Botanist Richard Pulteney's description of a 1526 copy states that "...if printed with numbered pages, [it] would make three hundred and fifty, exclusive of the Preface and Index."

=== Printers ===
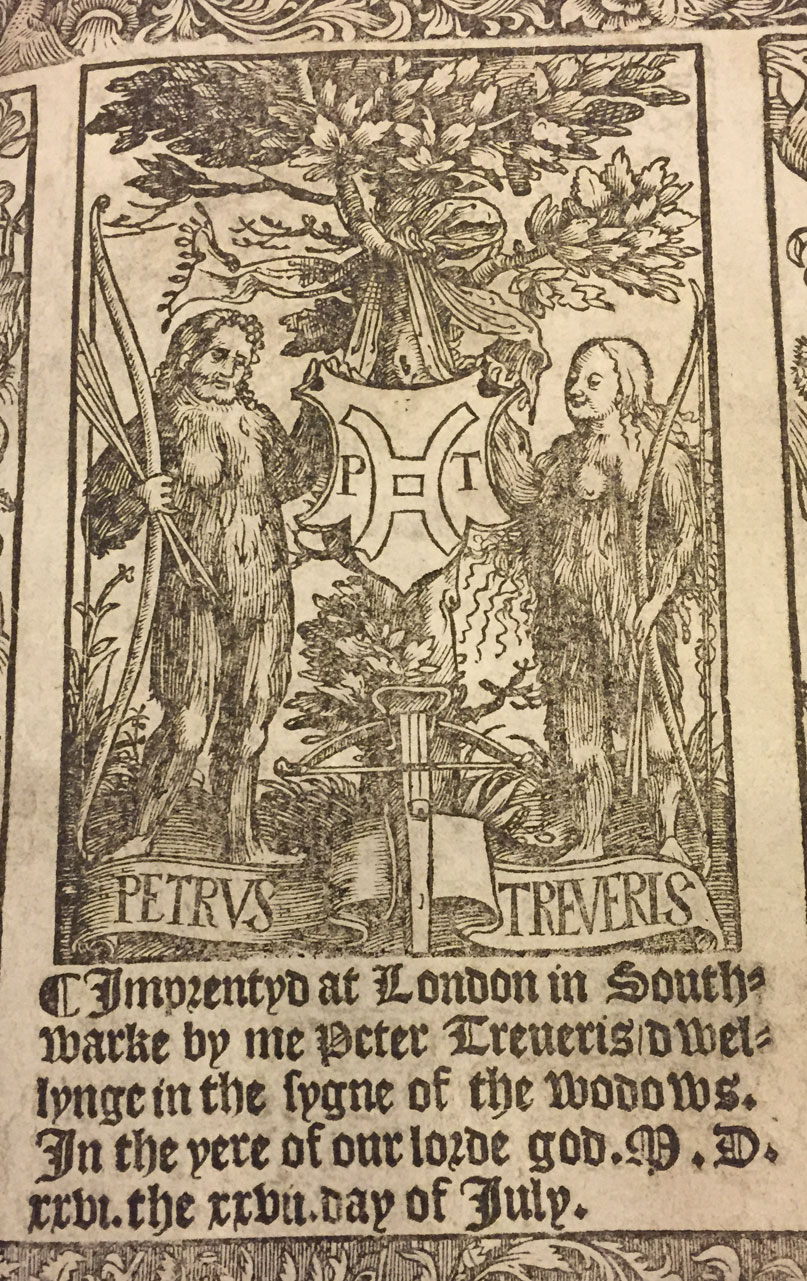
Peter Treveris's personal device of a wild man and wild woman, Grete Herball, 1526

Peter Treveris, printer, is widely believed to be responsible for the first productions of the Grete Herball. His dates of birth and death are unknown, but it is estimated that he died in the mid-1530s. Though there is some evidence suggesting Treveris first printed the Grete Herball in 1516, the earliest verifiable edition dates to July 27, 1526. This edition was printed at Southwark, as was the second edition in 1529. Treveris was active as a printer between approximately 1525 and 1532, during which time he printed such works as Hieronymus Braunschweig's Noble Handiwork of Surgery (1525), the Grete Herball (1526, 1529), and the Polychronicon (1527). The Grete Herball's translation from French may have been performed by his associate Lawrence Andrewe, a fellow printer and bookseller, but this is as yet unconfirmed. Some copies of the Herball contain an image of Treveris's personal device, a shield bearing his initials held up by a wild man and woman. Some copies also contain Andrewe's device, confirming their collaboration.

The Grete Herball proved popular enough to be reprinted several times after Treveris's death. Thome Gybson printed an updated edition "The grete herbal newly corrected" in 1539, and printer John Kyng produced the final Early Modern edition in 1561. Both Gybson and Kyng use fewer images and different frontispieces than Treveris's editions.

=== Editions ===
- 1516 - unconfirmed, P. Treveris, referred to by Joseph Ames
- 1525 - unconfirmed, P. Treveris, referred to by Hazlitt
- 1526 - printed by Peter Treveris, a copy can be found in the Honnold-Mudd Library Special collections in Claremont, CA
- 1527 - unconfirmed, P. Treveris for Lawrence Andrewe, referred to by Joseph Ames
- 1529 - printed by Peter Treveris, a copy can be found in Cambridge University's Rare Books Department.
- 1539 - printed by Thome Gybson, "The great herball newly corrected"
- 1550 - unconfirmed, referred to by Richard Pulteney
- 1561 - printed by John Kyng, an unillustrated copy exists at the Arnold Arboretum at Harvard University
- 1936 - Facsimile of the Peter Treveris 1526 edition, printed by Edward's Brothers
- 1995 - Facsimile of the Peter Treveris 1529 edition, then held by the Cetus Library, published privately by Abel & Mackinley and printed by E. & E. Plumbridge of Linton, Cambridgeshire. The book was reproduced in its original format, on mould made paper, prepared at the St. Cuthbert's paper mill, Somerset. It was printed in black letters on 346 pages (unnumbered) in two columns with 477 woodcuts. The print-run was limited to 207 unnumbered copies, never to be reissued. Each copy was presented with a marble paper binding, backed with green leather, in a sleeve box. This edition was never offered commercially for sale. Most copies remain with the heirs to the Cetus estate with a small number held in private collections.

=== Rarity ===
The first and second editions of the Grete Herball are extremely rare. Only three "complete and perfect" copies of the 1529 edition are known to exist, though fragments of other copies have been found. Those that do exist usually show signs of repair, such as being rebound or having replaced spines and added pages. One such copy, a 1529 edition transferred to Cambridge University in 2013, exhibits repair work done over many centuries. Christie's auction listing of a 1526 Grete Herball claims there are only three complete copies of the first edition as well, with incomplete copies held by Yale and in the Marshall Collection. Provenance of these books can be difficult to trace, and records of ownership often reach only to the eighteenth or nineteenth centuries.

Given their scarcity, copies of the Grete Herball are of interest to rare book collectors. Early editions have been valued in the thousands at auction. Sotheby's auction house valued one 1526 copy (bound together with Treveris's printing of the Noble Handiwork of Surgery (1525)) between £50,000 and £70,000 GBP. The 1526 copy sold by Christie's fetched US$5,625 on June 24, 2009, and was valued between $4000 – US$6000.

== Content ==
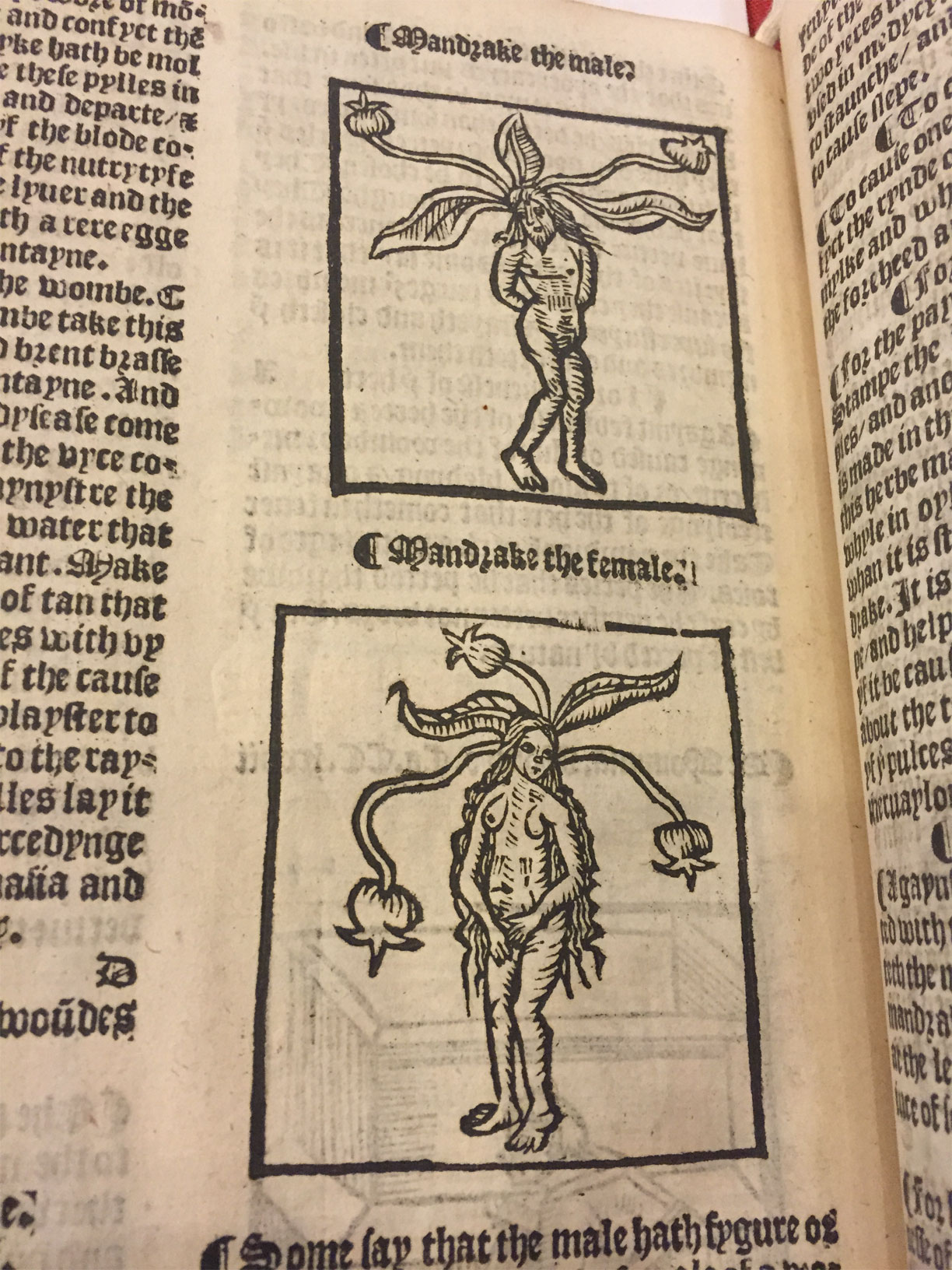
Human formed mandrake roots, Grete Herball, 1526

As a herbal text, the book's content is primarily on the medicinal uses and properties of the materials described. Exceptions to this rule are suggestions for cosmetic use or folklore associated with the item. One well-known entry concerns the Mandrake, a herb with the mythical human form of a man and a woman. Accompanying woodcuts demonstrate this belief, but the Grete Herball's entry text dismisses the myth outright: "Some say that the male hath figure or shape of a man. And the female of a woman, but that is false. For nature never gave forme or shape of mankynde to a herbe. But it is of trough (truth) that some hath shaped such figures by craft." Entries can also hold warnings for those seeking to use the items, such as the entry for Spodium (elephant ivory), which describes dog bones sometimes being passed off as ipodium (elephant bones) by unscrupulous physicians. Each plant and non-botanical is also described as being either hot or cold, dry or wet, and the "degree" of each. This categorization allowed doctors to prescribe a corresponding medicine for diseases, which were defined by the same system in a separate section of the book.

Copies of this herbal are not consistent in their current form, many having been rebound or bound with other books. The following arrangement is taken from the 1526 edition of the Grete Herball at Special Collections, The Claremont Colleges Library, Claremont, California.

=== Title page and frontispiece ===
The title page is dominated by the printed full title of the Grete Herball, with a large frontispiece depicting a man and woman working in a garden. In each corner a mandrake root of each gender is depicted. The title is printed in both red and black ink.

=== Anatomical chart ===
This full-page image is a frontal view of a human skeleton, with labels describing the major bones of the body.

=== Main text ===
There are approximately 400 entries for plants and non-botanical items. Of these, 150 plants are English natives. Some plant entries are mugwort, cypress, mandrake root, grapes, chamomile, muscat, and marrubium (horehound). Animals recommended for their medicinal value include hare, fox (fox grease is recommended for muscle cramps), goat, ox, elephant ivory, and beaver. Some of the minerals and liquids listed are lyme, glass, magnets, pearls, amber, sulfur, water, and vinegar. Foods that double as remedies are also present, with cheese prescribed for purgation, butter, honey, and zipules (a type of heavy fritter) recommended for toothaches. Some of the entries feature truly unusual remedies, such as a lengthy section on the use of mummy (spelled as mommie), the powdered version of which is described as a remedy for stopping nosebleeds. Besides medical uses, these entries also provide information on cosmetic applications of items, such as the bones of sepia (cuttlefish) for whitening the teeth and complexion.

=== Additional chapters ===
An addendum to the previous section, with the same style and format.

=== Diagnosis guide ===
This section contains information on physician's classifications of the humors and types of illness. This is according to the Galenic system of humors, with the four temperaments described according to the state of their "bryne" or humors. This is followed by instructions for diagnosis of illnesses, again by referencing the state of a person's "bryne".

=== Catalogue of ailments ===
A catalogue of illnesses and their symptoms. Some examples are alopecia, asthma, worms, cramps, flesh wounds, fluxes, and gout.

=== Index ===
The final index is an alphabetically organized list of various maladies, with reference to the entry number and first letter of appropriate medicines for each. The headings are often specific, such as "For wormes in the bely of chyldren" or "For broken synews."

== Scholarship ==
Usually, the Grete Herball is not the sole focus of scholarly work itself, but is mentioned in larger examinations of the history of herbals and botany. One exception is The English Plant Names in The Grete Herball (1526) A contribution to the Historical Study of English Plant-Name Usage by Swedish author Mats Rydén. It is a philological study focused on the herbal's English plant names, "...their frequency of use, provenance, typology, and synonymy (i.e. identity)...and changes in groups of names." It has been praised as filling a "shocking gap in English-language scholarship", but its potential use as a historical work has been questioned.
