= Richard Pulteney =

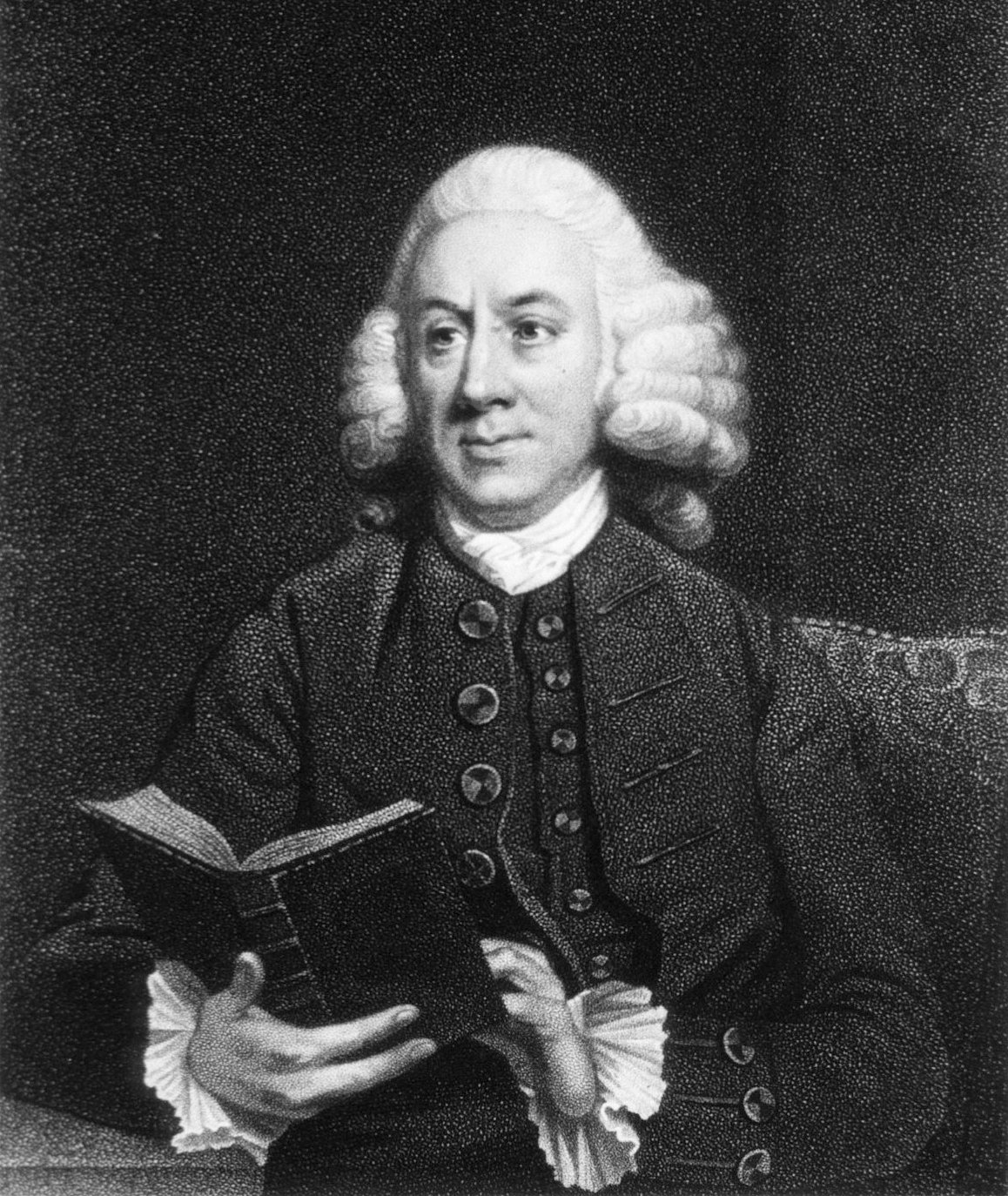
Richard Pulteney by P. Roberts, published 1805 (after Thomas Beach, 1788).

Richard Pulteney FRS FRSE FLS (17 February 1730 – 13 October 1801) was an English physician and botanist. He was a promoter of Linnaean taxonomy, and authored the first English language biography of Carl Linnaeus, entitled A General View of the Writings of Linnaeus.

== Life ==
He was born in Loughborough on 17 February 1730, the sole surviving child of thirteen children to Samuel Pulteney (1674–1754), a tailor, and his wife, Mary Tomlinson (1692–1759) from neighbouring Hathern. The family were Calvinists.

His maternal uncle, George Tomlinson of Hathern, instilled in him an early love of Natural History.

He was educated at Loughborough Grammar School, and a school house was later named after him. After being apprenticed as an apothecary in Loughborough he was then sent to Scotland to study medicine at Edinburgh University where he gained a doctorate (MD) in 1764. He served as an apothecary and physician in Leicestershire for some years before obtaining a position as personal physician to the elderly William Pulteney, 1st Earl of Bath, a very distant cousin, at his London address. In 1762 he was elected a Fellow of the Royal Society of London.

When the Earl died in 1764 he moved to Blandford in Dorset and remained there for the rest of his life. He formalised his role as doctor of the village in 1767. In this small rural community he had ample free time to devote himself to the study of nature.

In 1779 aged 49, he married Elizabeth Galton (d.1820), daughter of John Galton of Shapwick. They had no children but cared for one of Elizabeth's nieces as a daughter.

In 1793 he was elected a Fellow of the Royal Society of Edinburgh. His proposers were Daniel Rutherford, Dr Alexander Monro, and William Wright.

He died at Blandford in Dorset on 13 October 1801. He is buried in Langton Herring churchyard in Dorset. A memorial table to his memory was erected in Blandford church. He bequeathed his Hortus Siccus and collection of botanical books to the Linnaean Society.

== Publications ==
- Historical and Biographical Sketches of the Progress of Botany (1790)
- A General View of the Writings of Linnaeus (1781)

== Artistic recognition ==
His portrait by Thomas Beach is held by the Leicestershire County Council Museum.

His etched portrait by James Basire is held by the Scottish National Portrait Gallery.
