= Science and technology of the Han dynasty =

A gilded bronze oil lamp in the shape of a female servant, dated 2nd century BCE, found in the tomb of Dou Wan, wife to the Han prince Liu Sheng (d. 113 BCE); its sliding shutter allows for adjustments in the direction and brightness of light while it also traps smoke within the body, an anti-pollutant design.

Many significant developments in the history of science and technology in China took place during the Han dynasty (202 BCE – 220 CE). The Han period saw great innovations in metallurgy. Following the inventions of the blast furnace and cupola furnace during the Zhou dynasty (c. 1046 – 256 BCE) to make pig iron and cast iron respectively, the Han period saw the development of steel and wrought iron by use of the finery forge and puddling process. With the drilling of deep boreholes into the earth, the Chinese used not only derricks to lift brine up to the surface to be boiled into salt, but also set up bamboo-crafted pipeline transport systems which brought natural gas as fuel to the furnaces.

Smelting techniques were enhanced with inventions such as the waterwheel-powered bellows; the resulting widespread distribution of iron tools facilitated the growth of agriculture. For tilling the soil and planting straight rows of crops, the improved heavy-moldboard plough with three iron plowshares and sturdy multiple-tube iron seed drill were invented in the Han, which greatly enhanced production yields and thus sustained population growth. The method of supplying irrigation ditches with water was improved with the invention of the mechanical chain pump powered by the rotation of a waterwheel or draft animals, which could transport irrigation water up elevated terrains. The waterwheel was also used for operating trip hammers in pounding grain and in rotating the metal rings of the mechanical-driven astronomical armillary sphere representing the celestial sphere around the Earth.

People of the Han Empire initially wrote on hemp-bound bamboo scrolls; by the 2nd century CE, they had invented the papermaking process which created a writing medium that was both cheap and easy to produce. The invention of the wheelbarrow aided in the hauling of heavy loads. The maritime junk ship and stern-mounted steering rudder enabled the Chinese to venture out of calmer waters of interior lakes and rivers and into the open sea. The invention of the grid reference for maps and raised-relief map allowed for better navigation. In medicine, they used new herbal remedies to cure illnesses, calisthenics to keep physically fit, and regulated diets to avoid diseases. Authorities in the capital were warned ahead of time of the direction of sudden earthquakes with the invention of the seismometer that was tripped by a vibration-sensitive pendulum device.

To mark the passing of the seasons and special occasions, the Han used two variations of the lunisolar calendar, which were established due to efforts in astronomy and mathematics. Han-era Chinese advancements in mathematics include the discovery of square roots, cube roots, the Pythagorean theorem, Gaussian elimination, the Horner scheme, improved calculations of pi, and negative numbers. Hundreds of new roads and canals were built to facilitate transport, commerce, tax collection, communication, and movement of military troops. The Han-era Chinese also employed several types of bridges to cross waterways and deep gorges, such as beam bridges, arch bridges, simple suspension bridges, and pontoon bridges. Han ruins of defensive city walls made of brick or rammed earth still stand.

== Modern perspectives ==
Jin Guantao, a professor at the Chinese University of Hong Kong, Fan Hongye, a research fellow with the Chinese Academy of Sciences, and Liu Qingfeng, a professor at the Chinese University of Hong Kong, assert that the latter part of the Han dynasty was a unique period in the history of premodern Chinese science and technology. They compare it to the incredible pace of scientific and technological growth during the Song dynasty (960–1279). However, they also argue that without the influence of proto-scientific precepts in the ancient philosophy of Mohism, Chinese science continued to lack a definitive structure:

From the middle and late Eastern Han to the early Wei and Jin dynasties, the net growth of ancient Chinese science and technology experienced a peak (second only to that of the Northern Song dynasty) ...Han studies of the Confucian classics, which for a long time had hindered the socialization of science, were declining. If Mohism, rich in scientific thought, had rapidly grown and strengthened, the situation might have been very favorable to the development of a scientific structure. However, this did not happen because the seeds of the primitive structure of science were never formed. During the late Eastern Han, disastrous upheavals again occurred in the process of social transformation, leading to the greatest social disorder in Chinese history. One can imagine the effect of this calamity on science.

Joseph Needham, a professor from the University of Cambridge and author of the Science and Civilisation in China series, stated that the "Han time (especially the Later Han) was one of the relatively important periods as regards the history of science in China." He noted the advancements during Han of astronomy and calendrical sciences, the "beginnings of systematic botany and zoology", as well as the philosophical skepticism and rationalist thought embodied in Han works such as the Lunheng by the philosopher Wang Chong.

== Writing materials ==
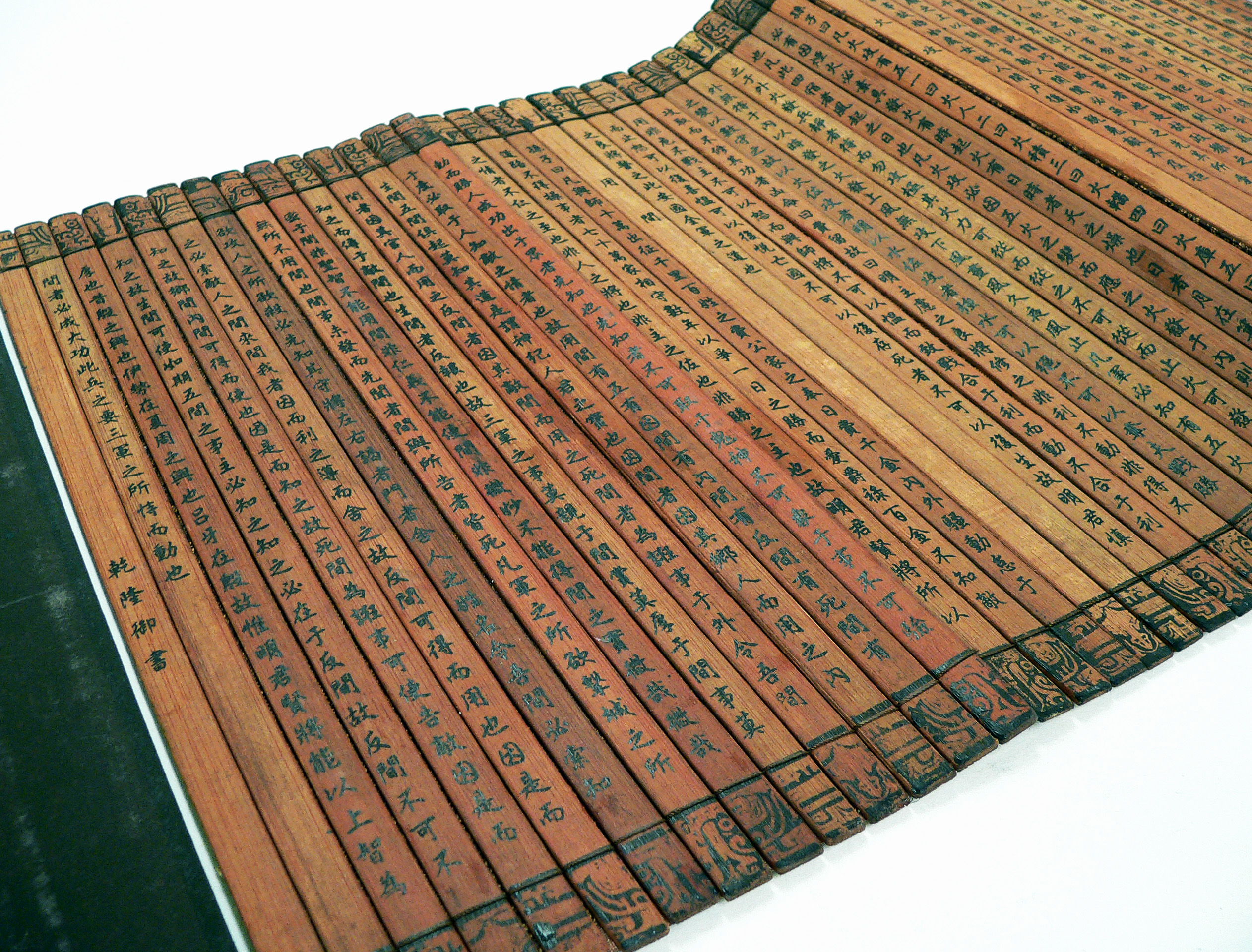
An unfolded traditional bamboo scroll book (Chinese: 册) of Sunzi's (fl. 6th century BCE) The Art of War, a Qing dynasty copy from the reign of the Qianlong Emperor (r. 1736–1795)

The most common writing mediums found in archaeological digs from ancient sites predating the Han period are shells and bones as well as bronzewares. In the beginning of the Han period, the chief writing mediums were bamboo (Chinese: 竹簡) and clay tablets, silk cloth, strips of soft wood, and rolled scrolls made of strips of bamboo sewn together with hempen string passed through drilled holes (册) and secured with clay stamps. The written characters on these narrow flat strips of bamboo were arranged into vertical columns.

While maps drawn in ink on flat silk cloths have been found in the tomb of the Marquess of Dai (interred in 168 BCE), the earliest known paper map found in China, dated 179–141 BCE and located at Fangmatan, is incidentally the oldest known piece of paper. Chinese hempen paper of the Western Han and early Eastern Han eras was of a coarse quality and used primarily as wrapping paper. The papermaking process was not formally introduced until the Eastern Han court eunuch Cai Lun created a process in 105 where mulberry tree bark, hemp, old linens, and fish nets were boiled together to make paper pulp. The oldest known piece of paper with writing on it comes from the ruins of a Chinese watchtower at Tsakhortei, Alxa League, Inner Mongolia, dated to 110 CE when the Han garrison abandoned the area following a nomadic Xiongnu attack. By the 3rd century, paper became one of China's chief writing mediums.

== Ceramics ==
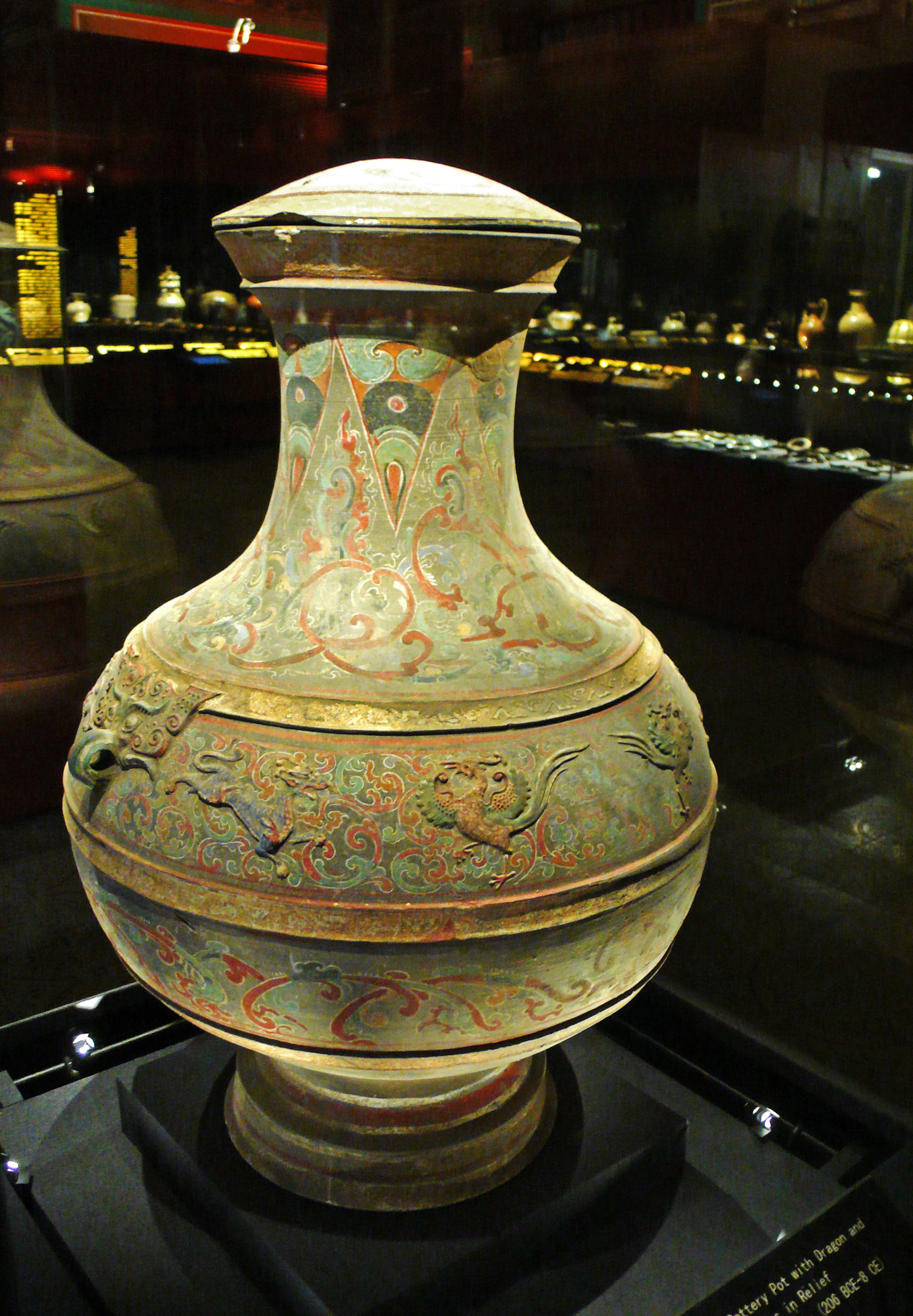
A painted pottery jar from the Western Han period, decorated with raised reliefs of dragons and phoenixes

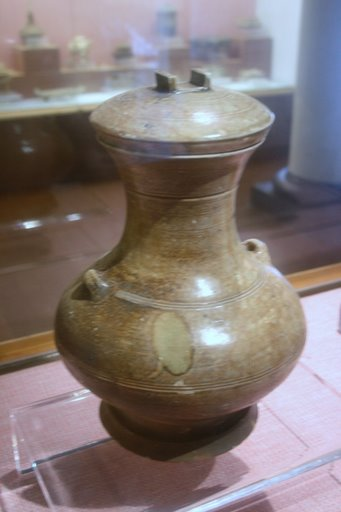
An Eastern-Han celadon ceramic bottle with a lid and lug handles

The Han ceramics industry was upheld by private businesses as well as local government agencies. Ceramics were used in domestic wares and utensils as well as construction materials for roof tiles and bricks.

Han dynasty grey pottery—its color derived from the clay that was used—was superior to earlier Chinese grey pottery due to the Han people's use of larger kiln chambers, longer firing tunnels, and improved chimney designs. Kilns of the Han dynasty making grey pottery were able to reach firing temperatures above 1,000 °C (1,830 °F). However, hard southern Chinese pottery made from a dense adhesive clay native only in the south was fired at even higher temperatures during the Han. Glazed pottery of the Shang (c. 1600 – c. 1050 BCE) and Zhou (c. 1050 – 256 BCE) dynasties were fired at high temperatures, but by the mid Western Han (206 BCE – 9 CE), a brown-glazed ceramic was made which was fired at 800 °C (1,470 °F), followed by a green-glazed ceramic which became popular in the Eastern Han (25–220 CE).

Wang Zhongshu states that the light-green stoneware known as celadon was thought to exist only since the Three Kingdoms period (220–265 CE), but argues that ceramic shards found at Eastern Han (25–220 CE) sites of Zhejiang province can be classified as celadon. However, Richard Dewar argues that true celadon was not created in China until the early Song dynasty (960–1279) when Chinese kilns were able to reach a minimum furnace temperature of 1,260 °C (2,300 °F), with a preferred range of 1,285 to 1,305 °C (2,345 to 2,381 °F) for celadon.

== Metallurgy ==
=== Furnaces and smelting techniques ===
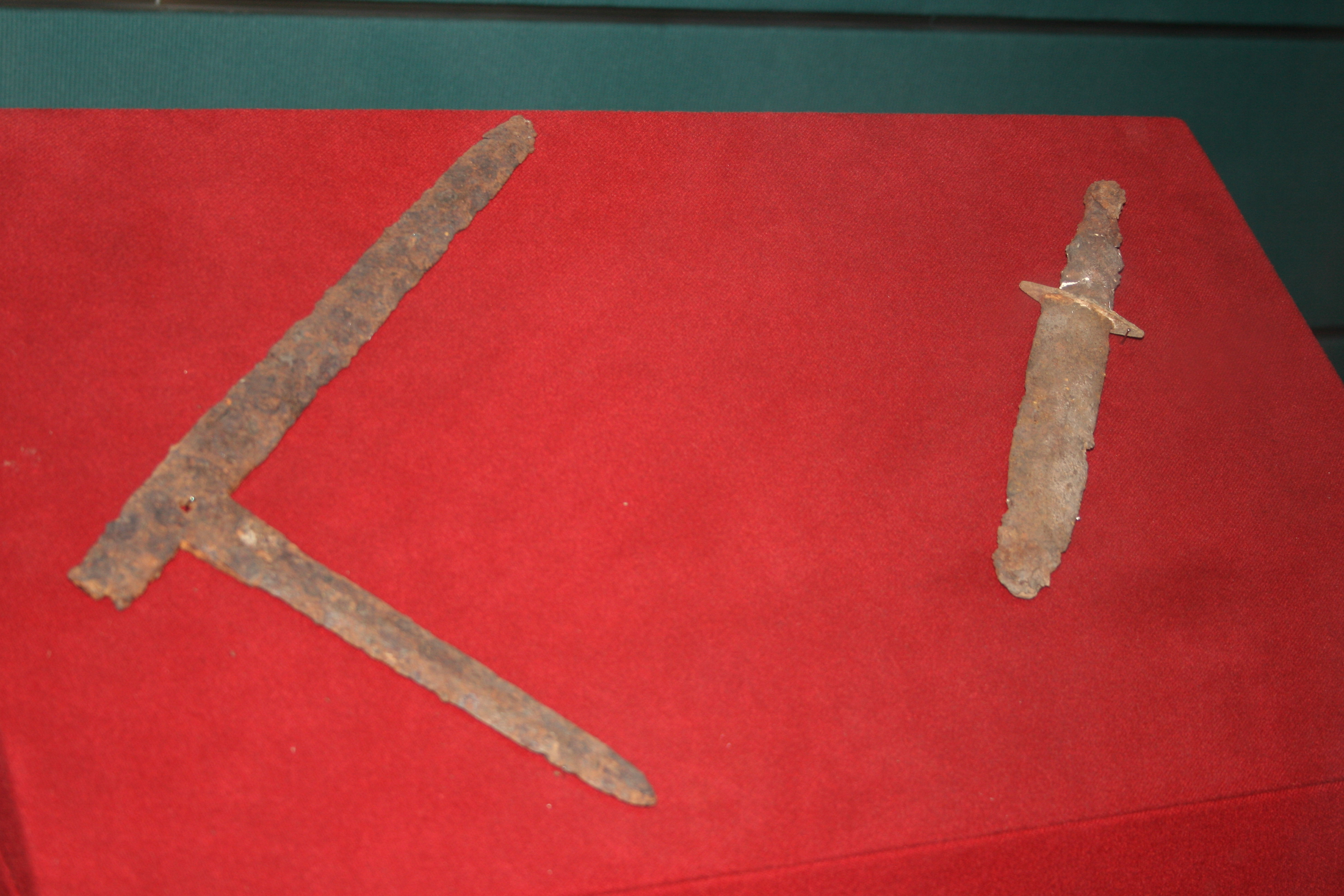
An iron chicken sickle and an iron dagger from the Han period

A blast furnace converts raw iron oxide into iron, which can be remelted in a cupola furnace to produce cast iron. The earliest specimens of cast iron found in China date to the 5th century BCE during the late Spring and Autumn period, yet the oldest discovered blast furnaces date to the 3rd century BCE and the majority date to the period after Emperor Wu of Han (r. 141–87 BCE) established a government monopoly over the iron industry in 117 BCE (most of the discovered iron works sites built before this date were merely foundries which recast iron that had been smelted elsewhere). Iron ore smelted in blast furnaces during the Han was rarely if ever cast directly into permanent molds; instead, the pig iron scraps were remelted in the cupola furnace to make cast iron. Cupola furnaces utilized a cold blast traveling through tuyere pipes from the bottom and over the top where the charge of charcoal and pig iron was introduced. The air traveling through the tuyere pipes thus became a hot blast once it reached the bottom of the furnace.

It was initially believed that Chinese civilization lacked the bloomery, however, bloomeries were discovered in large quantities in regions such as Southwestern China, and bloomery iron actually predominated over blast furnace iron in some places in China.

The Han Chinese were able to make wrought iron when they injected too much oxygen into the cupola furnace, causing decarburization. The Han-era Chinese were also able to convert cast iron and pig iron into wrought iron and steel by using the finery forge and puddling process, the earliest specimens of such dating to the 2nd century BCE. The semisubterranean walls of these furnaces were lined with refractory bricks and had bottoms made of refractory clay. Besides charcoal made of wood, Wang Zhongshu states that another furnace fuel used during the Han were "coal cakes", a mixture of coal powder, clay, and quartz.

=== Use of steel, iron, and bronze ===
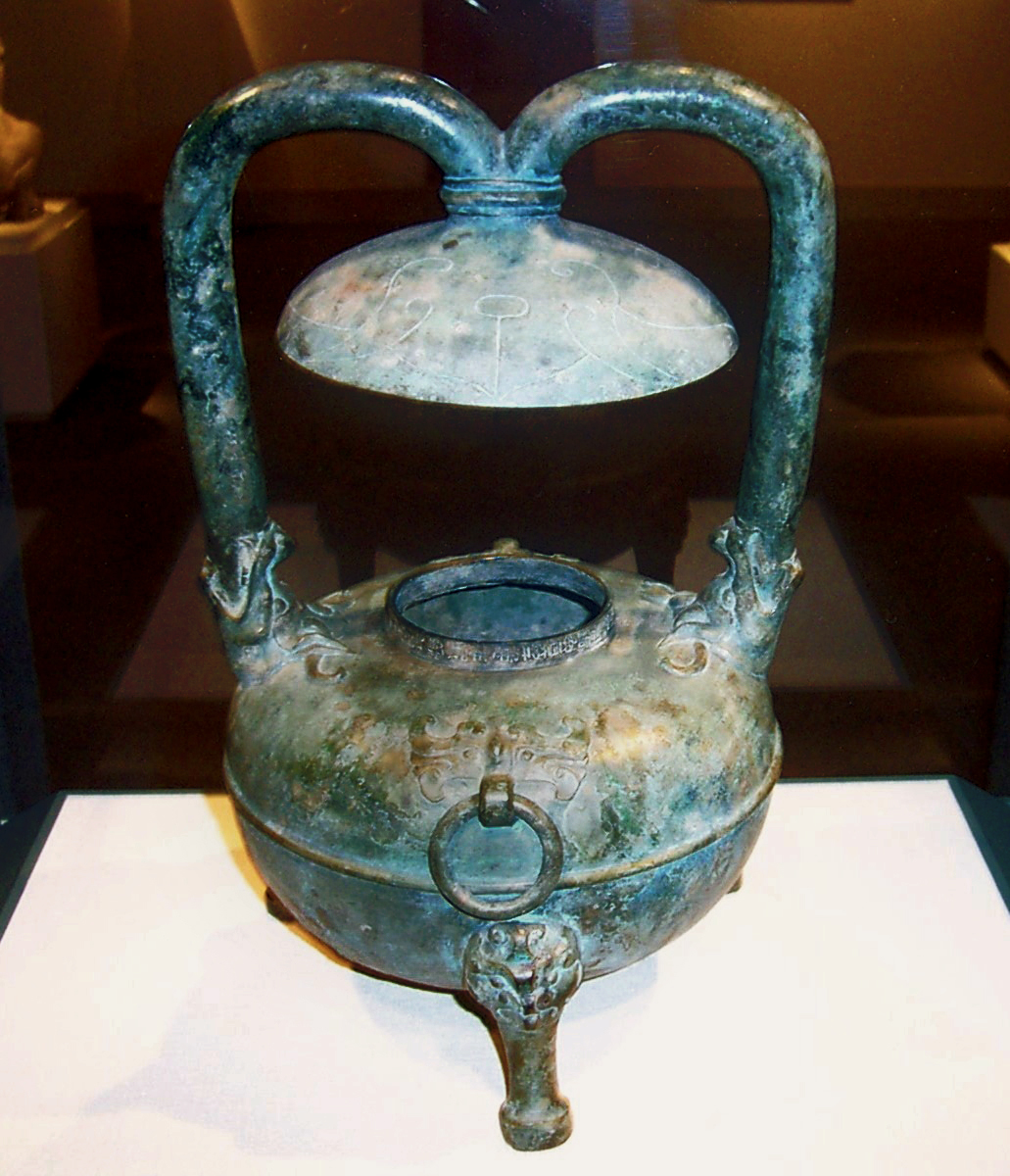
A Western-Han bronze tripod oil lamp, 1st century BCE

Donald B. Wagner writes that most domestic iron tools and implements produced during the Han were made of cheaper and more brittle cast iron, whereas the military preferred to use wrought iron and steel weaponry due to their more durable qualities. During the Han dynasty, the typical 0.5 m (1.6 ft) bronze sword of the Warring States period was gradually replaced with an iron sword measuring roughly 1 m (3.3 ft) in length. The ancient dagger-axe (ge) made of bronze was still used by Han soldiers, although it was gradually phased out by iron spears and iron ji halberds. Even arrowheads, which were traditionally made of bronze, gradually only had a bronze tip and iron shaft, until the end of the Han when the entire arrowhead was made solely of iron. Farmers, carpenters, craftsmen, stonemasons, and rammed earth builders had at their disposal iron tools such as the plowshare, pickaxe, spade, shovel, hoe, sickle, axe, adze, hammer, chisel, knife, saw, scratch awl, and nails. Common iron commodities found in Han dynasty homes included tripods, stoves, cooking pots, belt buckles, tweezers, fire tongs, scissors, kitchen knives, fish hooks, and needles. Mirrors and oil lamps were often made of either bronze or iron. Coin money minted during the Han was made of either copper or both copper and tin smelted together to make the bronze alloy.

== Agriculture ==
=== Tools and methods ===
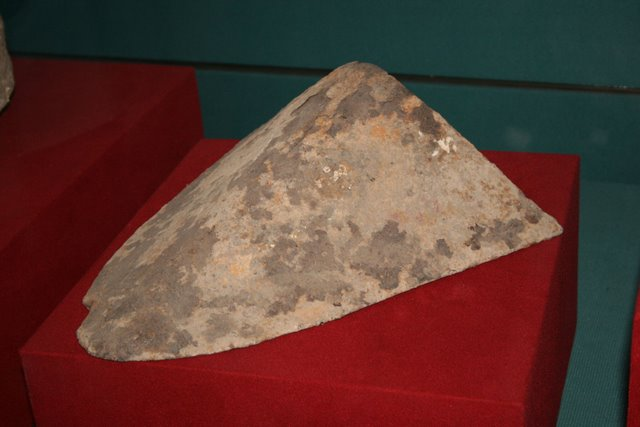
A Han-dynasty iron plowshare

Modern archaeologists have unearthed Han iron farming tools throughout China, from Inner Mongolia in the north to Yunnan in the south. The spade, shovel, pick, and plow were used for tillage, the hoe for weeding, the rake for loosening the soil, and the sickle for harvesting crops. Depending on their size, Han plows were driven by one to two oxen. Oxen were also used to pull the three-legged iron seed drill (invented in Han China by the 2nd century BCE), which enabled farmers to plant seeds in precise rows instead of casting them out by hand. While artwork of the Wei (220–266 CE) and Jin (266–420) periods show use of the harrow for breaking up chunks of soil after plowing, it perhaps first appeared in China during the Eastern Han (25–220 CE). Irrigation works for agriculture included the use of water wells, artificial ponds and embankments, dams, canals, and sluice gates.

=== Alternating fields ===
During Emperor Wu's (r. 141–87 BCE) reign, the Grain Intendant Zhao Guo (Chinese: 趙過) invented the alternating fields system (daitianfa 代田法). For every mou of land—a thin strip of land measuring 1.38 m (4.5 ft) wide and 331 m (1,086 ft) long, or an area of roughly 457 m^{2} (0.113 acres)—three low-lying furrows (quan 甽) that were each 0.23 m (0.75 ft) wide were sowed in straight lines with crop seed. While weeding in the summer, the loose soil of the ridges (long 壟) on either side of the furrows would gradually fall into the furrows, covering the sprouting crops and protecting them from wind and drought. Since the position of the furrows and ridges were reversed by the next year, this process was called the alternating fields system.

This system allowed crops to grow in straight lines from sowing to harvest, conserved moisture in the soil, and provided a stable annual yield. Zhao Guo first experimented with this system right outside the capital Chang'an, and once it proved successful, he sent out instructions for it to every commandery administrator, who were then responsible for disseminating these to the heads of every county, district, and hamlet in their commanderies.

Rich families who owned oxen and large heavy moldboard iron plows greatly benefited from this new system. However, poorer farmers who did not own oxen resorted to using teams of men to move a single plow, which was exhausting work. The author Cui Shi (Chinese: 催寔) (d. 170 CE) wrote in his Simin yueling (Chinese: 四民月令) that by the Eastern Han Era (25–220 CE) an improved plow was invented which needed only one man to control it, two oxen to pull it, had three plowshares, a seed box for the drills, a tool which turned down the soil, and could sow roughly 45,730 m^{2} (11.30 acres) of land in a single day.

=== Pit fields ===
During the reign of Emperor Cheng of Han (r. 33–37 BCE), Fan Shengzhi wrote a manual (the Fan Shengzhi shu) which described the pit field system (aotian 凹田). In this system, every mou of farmland was divided into 3,840 grids which each had a small pit that was dug 13.8 cm (5.4 in) deep and 13.8 cm (5.4 in) wide and had good quality manure mixed into the soil. Twenty seeds were sowed into each pit, which allegedly produced 0.6 L (20 oz) of harvested grain per pit, or roughly 2,000 L (67,630 oz) per mou. This system did not require oxen-driven plows or the most fertile land, since it could be employed even on sloping terrains where supplying water was difficult. Although this farming method was favored by the poor, it did require intensive labor, so only large families could maintain such a system.

=== Rice paddies ===
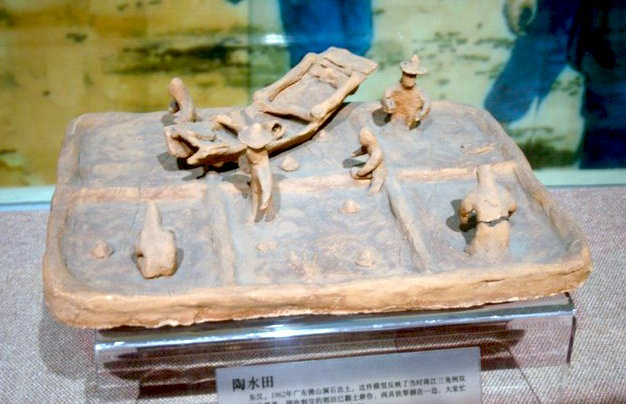
An Eastern-Han pottery model of a rice paddy field with farmers

Han farmers in the Yangzi River region of southern China often maintained paddy fields for growing rice. Every year, they would burn the weeds in the paddy field, drench it in water, sow rice by hand, and around harvest time cut the surviving weeds and drown them a second time. In this system, the field lays fallow for much of the year and thus did not remain very fertile. However, Han rice farmers to the north around the Huai River practiced the more advanced system of transplantation. In this system, individual plants were given intensive care (perhaps in the same location as the paddy field), their offshoots separated so that more water could be conserved, and the field could be heavily fertilized since winter crops were grown while the rice seedlings were situated nearby in a plant nursery.

== Mechanical and hydraulic engineering ==
=== Literary sources and archaeological evidence ===
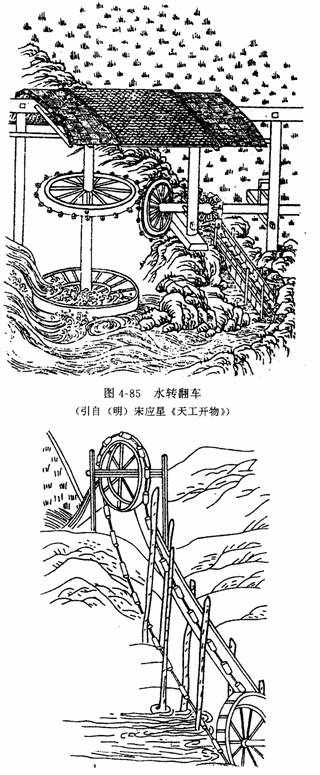
Two types of hydraulic-powered chain pumps from an encyclopedia written in 1637 by Song Yingxing

Evidence of Han-era mechanical engineering comes largely from the choice observational writings of sometimes disinterested Confucian scholars. Professional artisan-engineers (jiang Chinese: 匠) did not leave behind detailed records of their work. Han scholars, who often had little or no expertise in mechanical engineering, sometimes provided insufficient information on the various technologies they described.

Nevertheless, some Han literary sources provide crucial information. As written by Yang Xiong in 15 BCE, the belt drive was first used for a quilling device which wound silk fibers onto the bobbins of weaver shuttles. The invention of the belt drive was a crucial first step in the development of later technologies during the Song dynasty, such as the chain drive and spinning wheel.

The inventions of the artisan and mechanical engineer Ding Huan (Chinese: 丁緩) are mentioned in the Miscellaneous Notes on the Western Capital. The official and poet Sima Xiangru hinted in his writings that the Chinese used a censer in the form of a gimbal, a pivot support made of concentric rings which allow the central gimbal to rotate on an axis while remaining vertically positioned. However, the first explicit mention of the gimbal used as an incense burner occurred around 180 CE when the artisan Ding Huan created his 'Perfume Burner for use among Cushions' which allowed burning incense placed within the central gimbal to remain constantly level even when moved. Ding had other inventions as well. For the purpose of indoor air conditioning, he set up a large manually operated rotary fan which had rotating wheels that were 3 m (9.8 ft) in diameter. He also invented a lamp which he called the 'nine-storied hill-censer', since it was shaped as a hillside. When the cylindrical lamp was lit, the convection of rising hot air currents caused vanes placed on the top to spin, which in turn rotated painted paper figures of birds and other animals around the lamp.

When Emperor Gaozu of Han (r. 202–195 BCE) came upon the treasury of Qin Shi Huang (r. 221–210) following the downfall of the Qin dynasty (221–206), he found an entire miniature musical orchestra of puppets 1 m (3.3 ft) tall who played mouth organs if one pulled on ropes and blew into tubes to control them. Zhang Heng wrote in the 2nd century CE that people could be entertained by theatrical plays of artificial fish and dragons. Later, the inventor Ma Jun (fl. 220–265) invented a theater of moving mechanical puppets powered by the rotation of a hidden waterwheel.

From literary sources it is known that the collapsible umbrella was invented during Wang Mang's reign, although the simple parasol existed beforehand. This employed sliding levers and bendable joints that could be protracted and retracted.

Modern archaeology has led to the discovery of Han artwork portraying inventions which were otherwise absent in Han literary sources. This includes the crank handle. Han pottery tomb models of farmyards and gristmills possess the first known depictions of crank handles, which were used to operate the fans of winnowing machines. The machine was used to separate chaff from grain, but the Chinese of later dynasties also employed the crank handle for silk-reeling, hemp-spinning, flour-sifting, and drawing water from a well using the windlass. To measure distance traveled, the Han-era Chinese also created the odometer cart. This invention is depicted in Han artwork by the 2nd century CE, yet detailed written descriptions were not offered until the 3rd century. The wheels of this device rotated a set of gears which in turn forced mechanical figures to bang gongs and drums that alerted the travelers of the distance traveled (measured in li). From existing specimens found at archaeological sites, it is known that Han-era craftsmen made use of the sliding metal caliper to make minute measurements. Although Han-era calipers bear incised inscriptions of the exact day of the year they were manufactured, they are not mentioned in any Han literary sources.

=== Uses of the waterwheel and water clock ===
By the Han dynasty, the Chinese developed various uses for the waterwheel. An improvement of the simple lever-and-fulcrum tilt hammer device operated by one's foot, the hydraulic-powered trip hammer used for pounding, decorticating, and polishing grain was first mentioned in the Han dictionary Jijiupian of 40 BCE. It was also mentioned in the Regional Speech (Fangyan) dictionary written by Yang Xiong (53 BCE – 18 CE) in 15 BCE, the philosophical Xinlun 新論 written by Huan Tan (43 BCE – 28 CE) in 20 CE, the poetry of Ma Rong (79–166 CE), and the writings of Kong Rong (153–208 CE).

In his Balanced Discourse (Lunheng), the philosopher Wang Chong was the first in China to describe the square-pallet chain pump used to lift water (and other substances). Although some models were operated manually by foot pedals, some chain pumps were powered by a horizontal waterwheel which rotated large toothed gears and a horizontal axis beam. Their primary use was for lifting water into irrigation ditches, but chain pumps were also used in public works programs, such as when Zhang Rang (d. 189) had an engineer build several of them to lift water into pipes that provided the capital Luoyang and its palaces with clean water.

While acting as administrator of Nanyang in 31 CE, Du Shi invented a water-powered reciprocator which worked the bellows of the blast furnace and cupola furnace in smelting iron; before this invention, intensive manual labor was required to work the bellows.

Although the astronomical armillary sphere (representing the celestial sphere) had existed in China since the 1st century BCE, the mathematician and court astronomer Zhang Heng provided it with motive power by using the constant pressure head of an inflow water clock to rotate a waterwheel that acted on a set of gears. Zhang Heng was also the first to address the problem of the falling pressure head in the inflow water clock (which gradually slowed the timekeeping) by setting up an additional tank between the reservoir and inflow vessel.

=== Seismometer ===
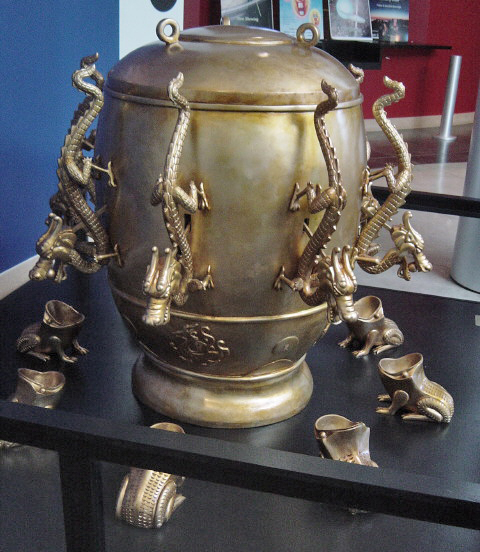
A modern replica of Zhang Heng's seismometer of 132

The Han court was responsible for the major efforts of disaster relief when natural disasters such as earthquakes devastated the lives of commoners. To better prepare for calamities, Zhang Heng invented a seismometer in 132 CE, which provided instant alert to authorities in the capital Luoyang that an earthquake had occurred in a location indicated by a specific cardinal or ordinal direction. Although no tremors could be felt in the capital when Zhang told the court that an earthquake had just occurred in the northwest, a message came soon afterwards that an earthquake had indeed struck 400 to 500 km (250 to 310 mi) northwest of Luoyang (in what is now modern Gansu). Zhang called his device the 'instrument for measuring the seasonal winds and the movements of the Earth' (Houfeng didong yi 候风地动仪), so-named because he and others thought that earthquakes were most likely caused by the enormous compression of trapped air.

As described in the Book of the Later Han, the frame of the seismometer was a domed bronze vessel in the shape of a wine jar, although it was 1.8 m (5.9 ft) in diameter and decorated with scenes of mountains and animals. The trigger mechanism was an inverted pendulum (which the Book of the Later Han calls the "central column") that, if disturbed by the ground tremors of earthquakes located near or far away, would swing and strike one of eight mobile arms (representing the eight directions), each with a crank and catch mechanism. The crank and a right angle lever would raise one of eight metal dragon heads located on the exterior, dislodging a metal ball from its mouth that dropped into the mouth of one of eight metal toads below arranged like the points on a compass rose, thus indicating the direction of the earthquake. The Book of the Later Han states that when the ball fell into any one of eight toad mouths, it produced a loud noise which gained the attention of those observing the device. While Wang Zhenduo (Chinese: 王振铎) accepted the idea that Zhang's seismometer had cranks and levers which were disturbed by the inverted pendulum, his contemporary Akitsune Imamura argued that the inverted pendulum could have had a pin at the top which, upon moving by force of the ground vibrations, would enter one of eight slots and expel the ball by pushing a slider. Since the Book of the Later Han states that the other seven dragon heads would not subsequently release the balls lodged up into their jaws after the first one had dropped, Imamura asserted that the pin of the pendulum would have been locked into the slot it had entered and thus immobilized the instrument until it was reset.

== Mathematics and astronomy ==
=== Mathematical treatises ===
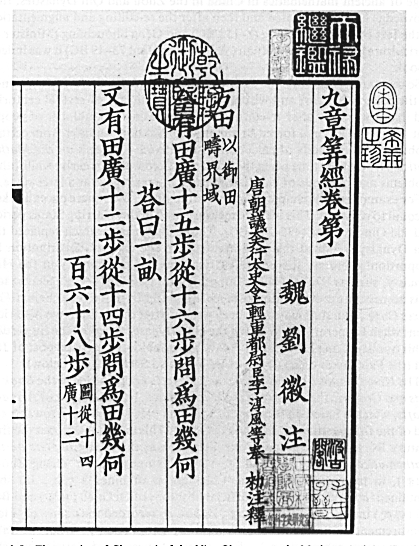
A page of the Nine Chapters on the Mathematical Art

One of the earliest surviving mathematical treatises of ancient China is the Book on Numbers and Computation (Suan shu shu), part of the Zhangjiashan Han bamboo texts dated 202 to 186 BCE and found in Jiangling County, Hubei. Another mathematical text compiled during the Han was The Arithmetical Classic of the Gnomon and the Circular Paths of Heaven (Zhoubi Suanjing), dated no earlier than the 1st century BCE (from perhaps multiple authors) and contained materials similar to those described by Yang Xiong in 15 BCE, yet the zhoubi school of mathematics was not explicitly mentioned until Cai Yong's commentary of 180. A preface was added to the text by Zhao Shuang (Chinese: 趙爽) in the 3rd century. There was also the Nine Chapters on the Mathematical Art (Jiuzhang Suanshu); its full title was found on two bronze standard measurers dated 179 CE (with speculation that its material existed in earlier books under different titles) and was provided with detailed commentary by Liu Hui (fl. 3rd century) in 263. It is worth noting in this context that many of the documents excavated from Qin and Han sites contain evidence of the practical mathematics used by administrators for inventories and taxes, as well as for calculating labor needed for public works projects, just as described in the mathematical treatises.

=== Innovations in the treatises ===
The Suan shu shu presents basic mathematics problems and solutions. It was most likely a handbook for day-to-day business transactions or affairs of government administration. It contains problems and solutions for field measurements of area, proportional exchange rates for agricultural millet and rice, distribution by proportion, short width division, and excess and deficiency. Some of the problems found in the Suan shu shu appear in the later text Jiuzhang suanshu; in five cases, the titles are exact matches. However, unlike the Jiuzhang suanshu, the Suan shu shu does not deal with problems involving right-angle triangles, square roots, cube roots, and matrix methods, which demonstrates the significant advancements made in Chinese mathematics between the writings of these two texts.

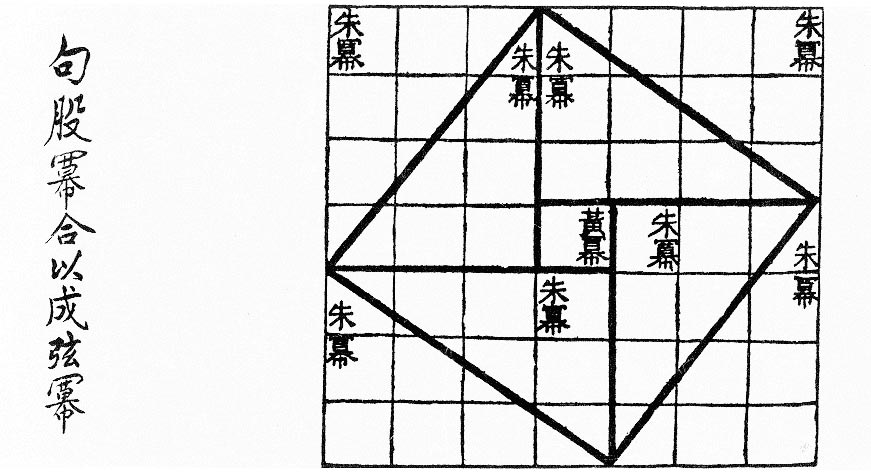
Mathematical proof for the Pythagorean theorem (Chinese: 勾股定理) as seen in the treatise Zhoubi Suanjing compiled during the Han dynasty

The Zhoubi suanjing is concerned with the application of mathematics to astronomy. In one problem which sought to determine the height of the Sun from the Earth and the diameter of the Sun, Chen Zi (Chinese: 陳子) instructs Rong Fang (Chinese: 榮方) to wait until the shadow cast by the 8 chi tall gnomon is 6 chi (one chi during the Han was 33 cm), so that a 3-4-5 right-angle triangle can be constructed where the base is 60,000 li (one li during the Han was the equivalent of 415 m or 1362 ft), the hypotenuse leading towards the sun is 100,000 li, and the height of the sun is 80,000 li. Like the Jiuzhang suanshu, the Zhoubi suanjing also gives mathematical proof for the "Gougu Theorem" (Chinese: 勾股定理; i.e. where c is the length of the hypotenuse and a and b are the lengths of the other two sides, respectively, a^{2} + b^{2} = c^{2}), which is known as the Pythagorean theorem in the West after the Greek mathematician Pythagoras (fl. 6th century BCE).

The Jiuzhang suanshu was perhaps the most groundbreaking of the three surviving Han treatises. It is the first known book to feature negative numbers, along with the Bakhshali manuscript (200? – 600? CE) of India and the book of the Greek mathematician Diophantus written in about 275 CE. Negative numbers appeared as black counting rods, while positive numbers appeared as red counting rods. Although the decimal system existed in China since the Shang dynasty (c. 1600 – c. 1050 BCE), the earliest evidence of a decimal fraction (i.e. the denominator is a power of ten) is an inscription on a standard volume-measuring vessel dated 5 CE and used by the mathematician and astronomer Liu Xin (46 BCE – 23 CE). Yet the first book to feature decimal fractions was the Jiuzhang suanshu, as a means to solve equations and represent measurements. Gaussian elimination, an algorithm used to solve linear equations, was known as the Array Rule in the Jiuzhang suanshu. While the book used continued fractions to find the roots of equations, Liu Hui built on this idea in the 3rd century when he increased the decimals to find the cube root of 1,860,867 (yielding the answer 123), the same method used in the Horner scheme named after William George Horner (1786–1837).

=== Approximations of pi ===
For centuries, the Chinese had simply approximated the value of pi as 3, until Liu Xin approximated it at 3.154 sometime between 1–5 CE, although the method he used to reach this value is unknown. Standard measuring vessels dating to the reign of Wang Mang (9–23 CE) also showed approximations for pi at 3.1590, 3.1497, and 3.167. Zhang Heng is the next known Han mathematician to have made an approximation for pi. Han mathematicians understood that the area of a square versus the area of its inscribed circle had an approximate ratio of 4:3, and also understood that the volume of a cube and the volume of its inscribed sphere would be 4^{2}:3^{2}. With D as diameter and V as volume, D^{3}:V = 16:9 or V=^{9}/_{16}D^{3}, a formula Zhang found fault with since he realized the value for diameter was inaccurate, the discrepancy being the value taken for the ratio. To fix this, Zhang added ^{1}/_{16}D^{3} to the formula, thus V = ^{9}/_{16}D^{3} + ^{1}/_{16}D^{3} = ^{5}/_{8}D^{3}. Since he found the ratio of the volume of the cube to the inscribed sphere at 8:5, the ratio of the area of a square to the inscribed circle is √8:√5. With this formula, Zhang was able to approximate pi as the square root of 10, or 3.162. After the Han, Liu Hui approximated pi as 3.14159, while the mathematician Zu Chongzhi (429–500) approximated pi at 3.141592 (or ^{355}/_{113}), the most accurate approximation the ancient Chinese would achieve.

=== Musical tuning and theory ===
Mathematics were also used in musical tuning and music theory. The 2nd-century BCE Huainanzi, compiled by eight scholars under the patronage of King Liu An (179–122 BCE), outlined the use of twelve tones on a musical scale. Jing Fang (78–37 BCE), a mathematician and music theorist, expanded these to create a scale of 60 tones. While doing so, Jing Fang realized that 53 just fifths is approximate to 31 octaves. By calculating the difference at 177147/176776, Jing reached the same value of 53 equal temperament duly discovered by the German mathematician Nicholas Mercator (1620–1687) (i.e. 3^{53}/2^{84} 3^{53} / 2^{84}, known as Mercator's comma). Later, the prince Zhu Zaiyu (1536–1611) in Ming China and Simon Stevin (1548–1620) of the Flemish Region in Europe would simultaneously (but separately) discover the mathematical formula for equal temperament.

=== Astronomical observations ===
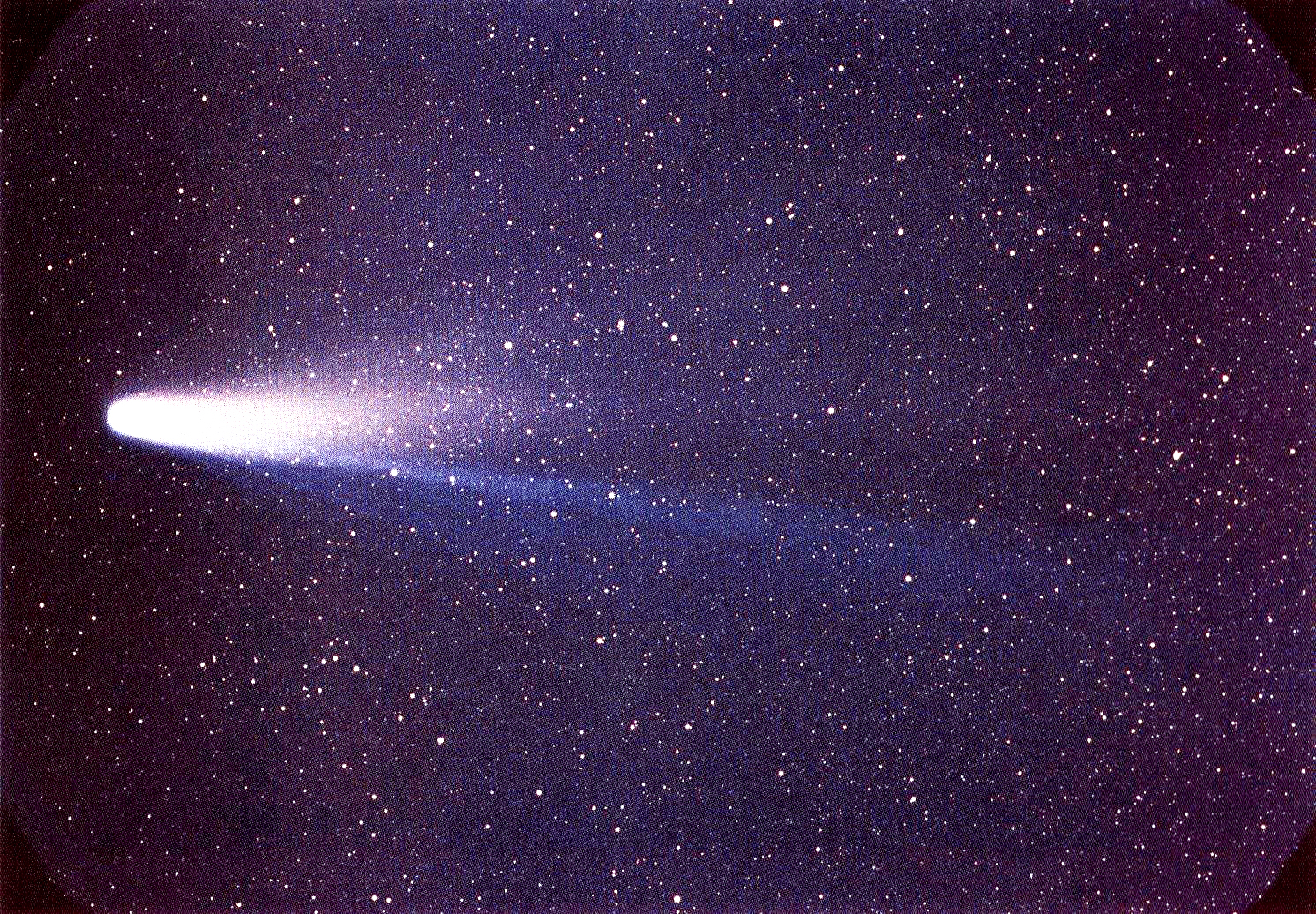
The Han-era Chinese observed and tracked the movements of Halley's Comet in 12 BCE, seen here in its 1986 reappearance.

The ancient Chinese made careful observations of heavenly bodies and phenomena since observations of the cosmos were used for astrology and prognostication. The astronomer Gan De (fl. 4th century BCE) from the State of Qi was the first in history to acknowledge sunspots as genuine solar phenomena (and not obstructing natural satellites as thought in the West after Einhard's observation in 807 CE), while the first precisely dated sunspot observation in China occurred on May 10, 28 BCE, during the reign of Emperor Cheng of Han (r. 33–7 BCE). Among the Mawangdui Silk Texts dated no later than 168 BCE (when they were sealed in a tomb at Mawangdui Han tombs site, Changsha, Hunan province), the Miscellaneous Readings of Cosmic Patterns and Pneuma Images (Tianwen qixiang zazhan 天文氣象雜占) manuscript illustrates in writings and ink drawings roughly 300 different climatic and astronomical features, including clouds, mirages, rainbows, stars, constellations, and comets. Another silk text from the same site reports the times and locations of the rising and setting of planets in the night sky from the years 246–177 BCE.

The Han-era Chinese noted the passage of the same comet seen in Persia for the birth of Mithridates II of Parthia in 135 BCE, the same comet the Romans observed close to the assassination of Julius Caesar in 44 BCE, Halley's Comet in 12 BCE, the same comet noted by Roman historian Cassius Dio (c. 155 – c. 229 CE) for 13 CE, and (what is now known to have been) a supernova in AD 185. For various comets discussed in the Han-era history books Records of the Grand Historian and Book of Han, details are given for their position in the sky and direction they were moving, the length of time they were visible, their color, and their size.

The Han-era Chinese also made star catalogues, such as historian Sima Qian's (145–86 BCE) A Monograph on Celestial Officials (Tianguanshu 天官書) and Zhang Heng's 2nd-century-CE star catalogue which featured roughly 2,500 stars and 124 constellations. To create a three-dimensional representation of such observations, Astronomer Geng Shouchang (Chinese: 耿壽昌) provided his armillary sphere with an equatorial ring in 52 BCE. By 84 CE, the elliptical ring was added to the armillary sphere, while Zhang Heng's model of 125 added the celestial horizon ring and meridian ring.

=== Han calendars ===
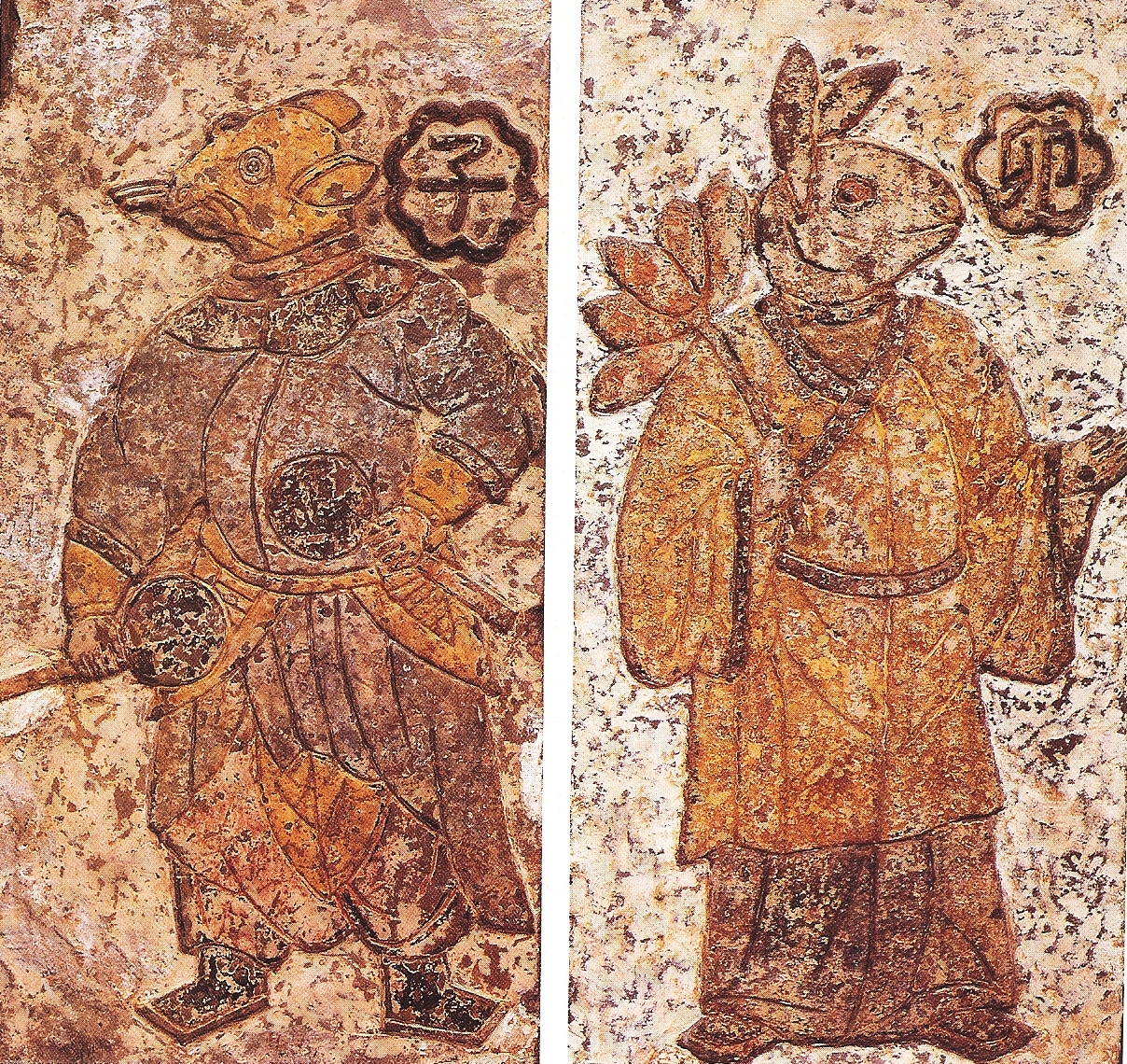
Han-dynasty paintings on tile; being conscious of time, the Chinese believed in guardian spirits for the divisions of day and night, such as these two guardians here representing 11 pm to 1 am (left) and 5 am to 7 am (right).

The Han Chinese used astronomical studies mainly to construct and revise their calendar. In contrast to the Julian calendar (46 BCE) and Gregorian calendar (1582) of the West (but like the Hellenic calendars of Classical Greece), the Chinese calendar is a lunisolar calendar, meaning that it uses the precise movements of the Sun and Moon as time-markers throughout the year. During the spring and autumn periods of the 5th century BCE, the Chinese established the Sifen calendar (古四分历), which measured the tropical year at 365^{1}/_{4} days (like the Julian calendar of Rome). Emperor Wu replaced this with the new Taichu calendar (Chinese: 太初历) in 104 BCE, which measured the tropical year at 365^{385}/_{1539} days and the lunar month at 29^{43}/_{81} days. Since the Taichu calendar had become inaccurate over two centuries, Emperor Zhang of Han (r. 75–88 CE) halted its use and revived use of the Sifen calendar. It was more than a millennium later that astronomer Guo Shoujing (1233–1316) would set the tropical year at 365.2425 days for his Shoushi calendar (Chinese: 授時曆), the same value used in the Gregorian calendar. Besides the use of the calendar for regulating agricultural practices throughout the seasons, it was also used to mark important dates in the Sexagenary cycle—constructed by celestial stems (gan 干) and Earthly Branches (zhi 支), each of the latter associated with an animal of the Chinese zodiac.

=== Astronomical theory ===
The Han-era Chinese discussed the illumination and shapes of heavenly bodies: were they flat and circular, or were they rounded and spherical? Jing Fang wrote in the 1st century BCE that Han astronomers believed the Sun, Moon, and planets were spherical like balls or crossbow bullets. He also wrote that the Moon and planets produce no light of their own, are viewable to people on Earth only because they are illuminated by the Sun, and those parts not illuminated by the Sun would be dark on the other side.

In his Balanced Discourse (Lunheng), Wang Chong wrote that some Han thinkers believed that rain fell from the Heavens (i.e. where the stars were located). Wang argued that, although rain fell from above, this common theory was false. He agreed with another theory that stated clouds were formed by the evaporation of water on Earth, and that since clouds disperse rain, clouds and rain are in fact one and the same; in essence, he accurately described the water cycle.

In the 2nd century CE, Zhang Heng drew a similar comparison to Jing's by stating that the Sun is like fire and the Moon and planets are like water, since fire produces light and water reflects it. He also repeated Jing's comment that the side of the Moon not illuminated by the Sun was left in darkness. However, Zhang noted that sunlight did not always reach the Moon since the Earth obstructs the rays during a lunar eclipse. He also noted that a solar eclipse occurred when the Moon and Sun crossed paths to block sunlight from reaching earth.

Zhao Shaung's 3rd-century commentary in the Zhoubi suanjing describes two astronomical theories: in one, the heavens are shaped as a hemi-spherical dome extending over the Earth, while the other compares the Earth to the central yolk of an egg, where the heavens are shaped as a celestial sphere around the earth. The latter astronomical theory was mentioned by Yang Xiong in his Model Sayings (Fayan 法言) and expounded on by Zhang Heng in his Spiritual Constitution of the Universe (Lingxian 靈憲) of 120 CE.

== Structural engineering and public works ==
=== Materials and construction ===
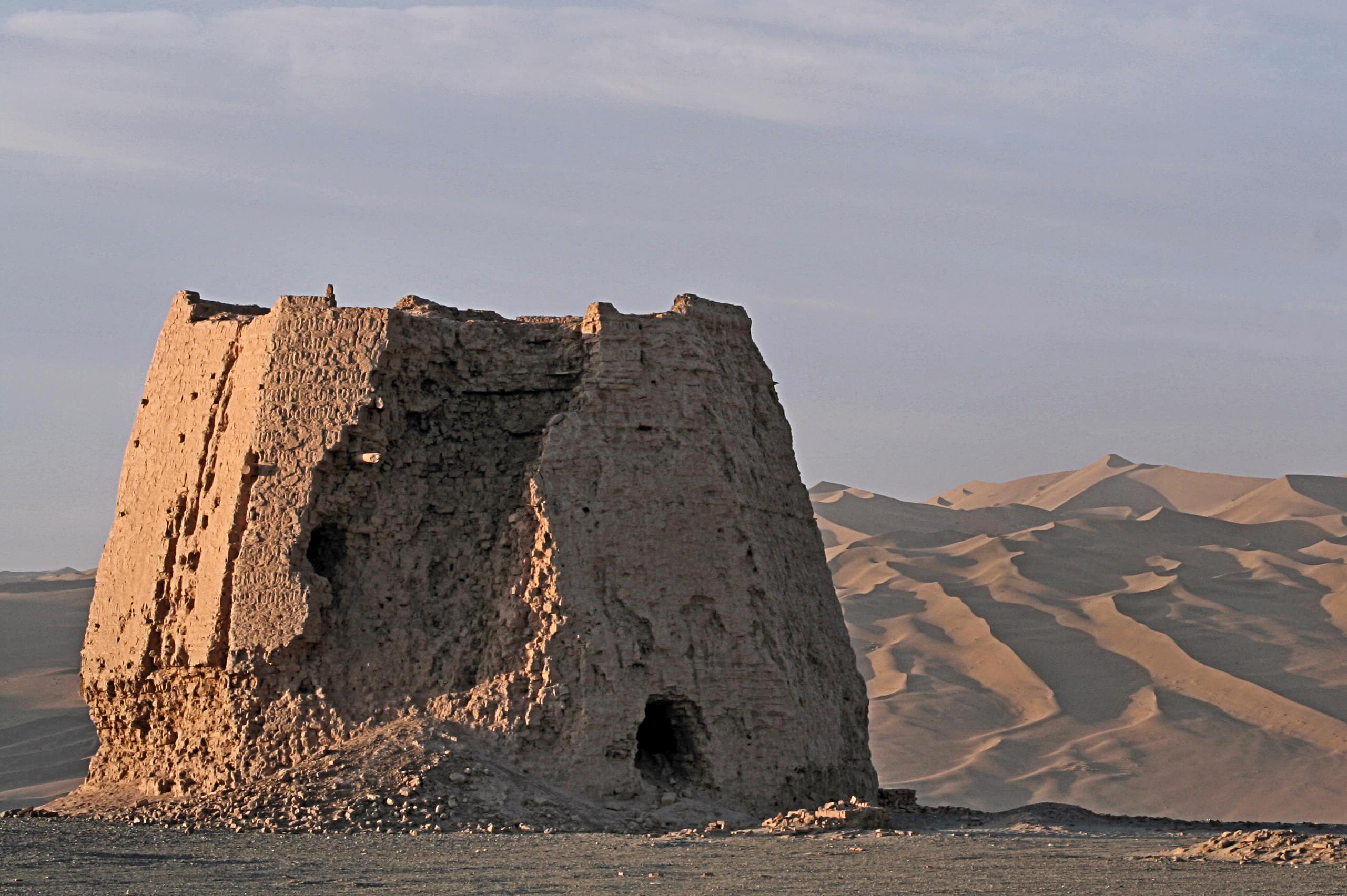
The ruins of a Han-dynasty watchtower made of rammed earth at Dunhuang, Gansu province, the eastern end of the Silk Road

Timber was the chief building material in Han architecture. It was used for grand palace halls, multi-story towers, multi-story residential halls, and humble abodes. However, due to wood's decay over time and susceptibility to fire, the oldest wooden buildings found in China (i.e. several temple halls of Mount Wutai) date no earlier than the Tang dynasty (618–907). Architectural historian Robert L. Thorp describes the scarcity of Han-era archaeological remains, as well as the often unreliable Han-era literary and artistic sources used by historians for clues about non-existent Han architecture. What remains of Han-dynasty architecture are ruins of brick and rammed earth walls (including aboveground city walls and underground tomb walls), rammed earth platforms for terraced altars and halls, funerary stone or brick pillar-gates, and scattered ceramic roof tiles that once adorned timber halls. Sections of the Han-era rammed earth Great Wall still exist in Gansu province, along with the Han frontier ruins of thirty beacon towers and two fortified castles with crenellations. Han walls of frontier towns and forts in Inner Mongolia were typically constructed with stamped clay bricks instead of rammed earth.

Thatched or tiled roofs were supported by wooden pillars, since the addition of brick, rammed earth, or mud walls of these halls did not actually support the roof. Stone and plaster were also used for domestic architecture. Tiled eaves projecting outward were built to distance falling rainwater from the walls; they were supported by dougong brackets that were sometimes elaborately decorated. Molded designs usually decorated the ends of roof tiles, as seen in artistic models of buildings and in surviving tile pieces.

=== Courtyard homes ===
Valuable clues about Han architecture can be found in Han artwork of ceramic models, paintings, and carved or stamped bricks discovered in tombs and other sites. The layout of Han tombs were also built like underground houses, comparable to the scenes of courtyard houses found on tomb bricks and in three-dimensional models. Han homes had a courtyard area (and some had multiple courtyards) with halls that were slightly elevated above it and connected by stairways. Multi-story buildings included the main colonnaded residence halls built around the courtyards as well as watchtowers. The halls were built with intersecting crossbeams and rafters that were usually carved with decorations; stairways and walls were usually plastered over to produce a smooth surface and then painted.

=== Chang'an and Luoyang, the Han capitals ===
The ruins of the walls of Han's first capital Chang'an still stand today at 12 m (39 ft) in height with a base width of 12 to 16 m (39 to 52 ft). Modern archaeological surveys have proven that the eastern wall was 6,000 m (20,000 ft) long, the southern wall was 7,600 m (24,900 ft) long, the western wall was 4,900 m (16,100 ft) long, and the northern wall was 7,200 (23,622 ft) long. Overall the total length of walls equalled 25,700 m (84,300 ft), and formed a roughly square layout (although the southern and northern walls had sections which zigzagged due to topographical concerns: rough terrain existed along the southern wall and the course of the Wei River obstructed the straight path of the northern wall). The city's moat was 8 m (26 ft) wide and 3 m (9.8 ft) deep; the remains of what were wooden bridges have been discovered along the moat. Chang'an had twelve gatehouses leading into the city, three for each side of the wall, and acted as terminus points for the main avenues. Every gatehouse had three gateway entrances that were each 6 m (20 ft) wide; Han-era writers claimed that each gateway could accommodate the traffic of four horse-drawn carriages at once. The drainage system included many drainholes that were dug under these gates and lined with bricks that form arches, where ceramic water pipes have been found that once connected to the ditches built alongside the major streets. Only some wall sections and platform foundations of the city's once lavish imperial palaces remain. Likewise, the stone foundations of the armory were also discovered, but its wooden architecture had long since disappeared.

Some sections of the wall ruins of Han's second capital Luoyang still stand at 10 m (33 ft) in height and 25 m (82 ft) in width at the base. The eastern wall was 3,900 m (12,800 ft) long, the western wall was 3,400 m (11,200 ft) long, and the northern wall was 2,700 m (8,900 ft) long, yet the southern wall was washed away when the Luo River changed its course centuries ago; by using the terminus points of the eastern and western walls, historians estimate that the southern wall was 2,460 m (8,070 ft) long. The overall walled enclosure formed a rectangular shape, yet with some disruptive curves due to topographical obstructions. Like Chang'an, Luoyang had twelve gatehouses, three for each side of the wall, while each gatehouse had three gateway entrances which led to major avenues within the city. The rammed earth foundational platforms of religious altars and terraces still stand today outside of the walled perimeter of Luoyang, dedicated to the worship of deities and where state sacrifices were conducted. They were approached by long ramps and once had timber halls built on top with verandas on the lower levels.

=== Underground tombs ===
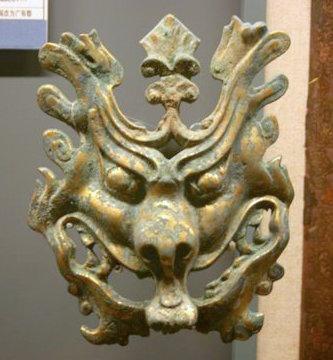
A Western-Han bronze door knocker in the shape of an animalistic head; door knockers have also been found in Han artwork, such as on ceramic models of gates leading to lower-level courtyards of multi-story towers and on underground stone tomb doors.

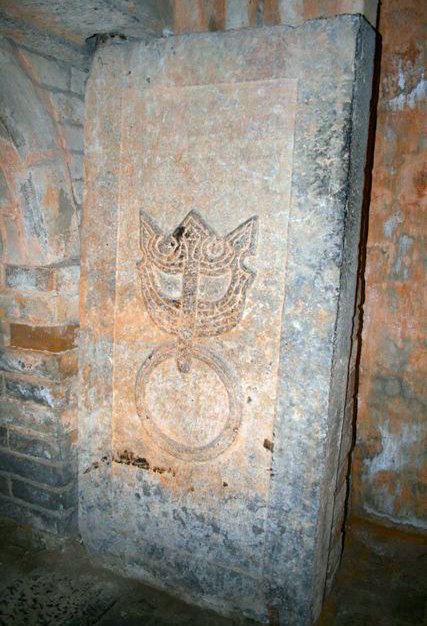
An Eastern-Han stone-carved tomb door decorated with a ringed door knocker, from a tomb in Luoyang

By the 1980s, over ten thousand brick-and-stone underground Han tombs had been discovered throughout China. Earlier Chinese tombs dating to the Warring States were often vertically dug pits lined with wooden walls. In digging the tomb sites, Han workers would first build vertical pits and then dig laterally, hence the name "horizontal pits" for Han tombs; this method was also used for tomb sites dug into the sides of mountains. The walls of most Western Han tombs were built of large hollow bricks while the smaller, non-hollow brick type that dominated Eastern Han tomb architecture (with some made out of stone) appeared in the late Western Han. The smaller brick type was better-suited for Han tomb archways at entrances, vaulted chambers, and domed roofs. Underground vaults and domes did not require buttress supports since they were held in place by earthen pits. The use of brick vaults and domes in aboveground Han structures is unknown.

The layout of tombs dug into the sides of mountains typically had a front chamber, side chambers, and a rear chambers designed to imitate a complex of aboveground halls. The tomb of King Liu Sheng (d. 113 BCE) in Hebei province not only had a front hall with window drapes and grave goods, carriages and horses in the southern separate side chamber, and storage goods in the northern side chamber, but also the remains of real timber houses with tiled roofs erected within (along with a house made of stone slabs and two stone doors in the rear chamber). Doors made completely out of stone were found in many Han tombs as well as tombs in later dynasties.

A total of twenty-nine monumental brick or stone-carved pillar-gates (que) from the Han dynasty have survived and can be found in the aboveground areas around Han tomb and shrine sites. They often formed part of outer walls, usually flanking an entry but sometimes at the corners of walled enclosures. Although they lack wooden and ceramic components, they feature imitation roof tiles, eaves, porches, and balustrades.

=== Boreholes and mining shafts ===
On Han tomb brick reliefs of Sichuan province, scenes of borehole drilling for mining projects are shown. They show towering derricks lifting liquid brine through bamboo pipes to the surface so that the brine could be distilled in evaporation pans over the heat of furnaces and produce salt. The furnaces were heated by natural gas brought by bamboo pipes, with gas brought up from 610 m (2,000 ft) below the surface. The drill bit for digging boreholes was operated by a team of men jumping on and off a beam while the boring tool was rotated by a draft animal, usually oxen or water buffaloes. Han boreholes dug for collecting brine could reach hundreds of meters (feet) beneath the Earth's surface. Mining shafts dating to the Han dynasty have been found which reach depths of hundreds of meters (feet) beneath the earth, complete with spacious underground rooms structured by timber frames along with ladders and iron tools left behind.

=== Ceramic model buildings ===
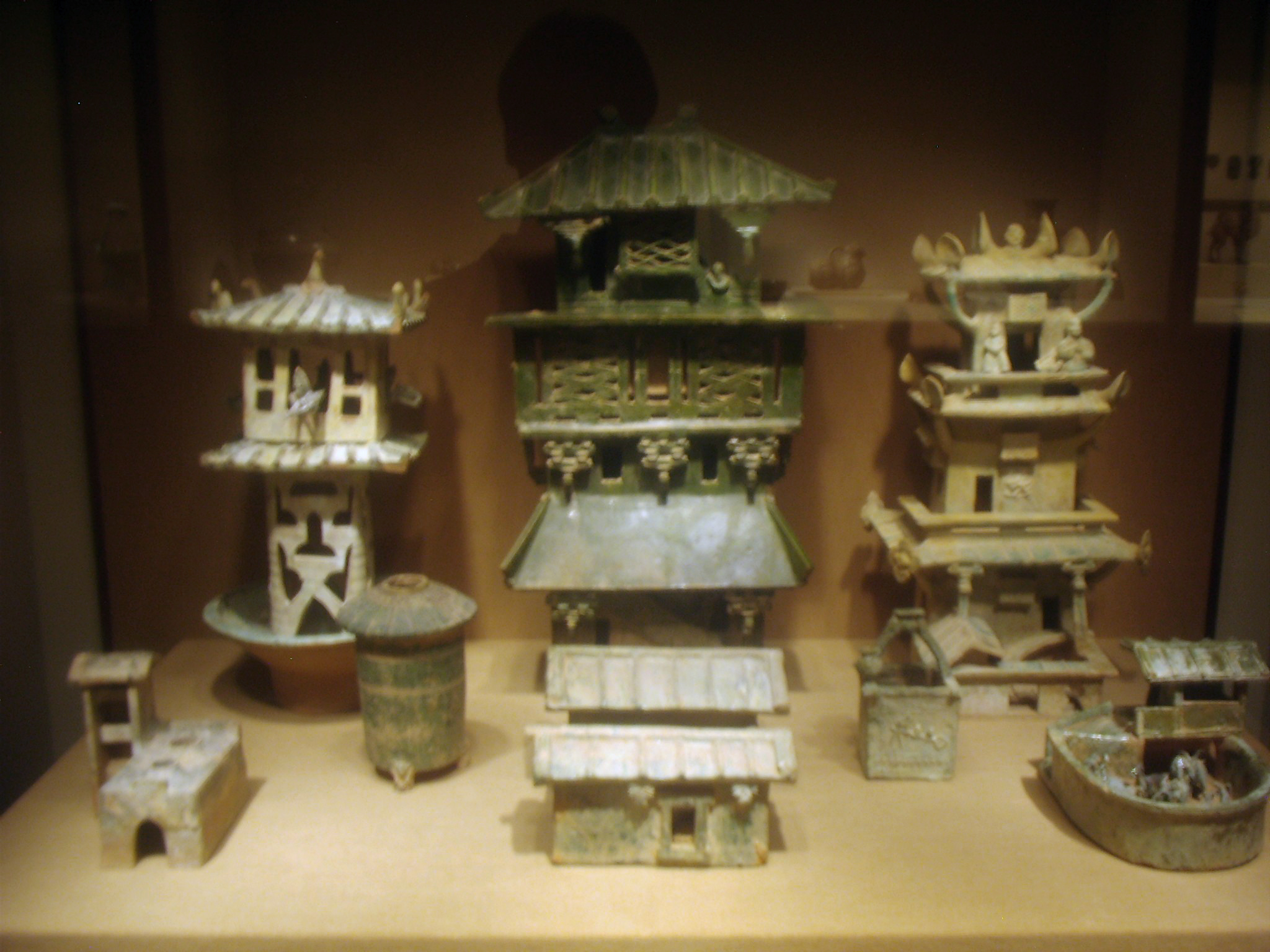
Ceramic models of a watchtower with crossbowmen (left), two residential towers (center and right), one with a first-floor courtyard and human figures on the top-floor balcony, along with other buildings

There are Han-era literary references to tall towers found in the capital cities; they often served as watchtowers, astronomical observatories, and religious establishments meant to attract the favor of immortals. The court eunuchs Zhao Zhong and Zhang Rang discouraged the aloof Emperor Ling of Han (r. 168–189 CE) from ascending to the top floors of tall towers (claiming it would cause bad luck), in order to conceal from him the enormous palatial mansions the eunuchs built for themselves in Luoyang. It is not known for certain whether or not miniature ceramic models of residential towers and watchtowers found in Han-dynasty tombs are completely faithful representations of such timber towers, yet they reveal vital clues about lost timber architecture.

There are only a handful of existing ceramic models of multi-story towers from pre-Han and Western Han eras; the bulk of the hundreds of towers found so far were made during the Eastern Han period. Model towers could be fired as one piece in the kiln or assembled from several different ceramic pieces to create the whole. No one tower is a duplicate of the other, yet they share common features. They often had a walled courtyard at the bottom, a balcony with balustrades and windows for every floor, roof tiles capping and concealing the ceiling rafters, human figures peering out the windows or standing on the balconies, door knockers, and pets such as dogs in the bottom courtyard. Perhaps the most direct pieces of evidence to suggest that miniature ceramic tower models are faithful representations of real-life Han timber towers are tile patterns. Artistic patterns found on the circular tiles that cap the eave-ends on the miniature models are exact matches of patterns found on real-life Han roof tiles excavated at sites such as the royal palaces in Chang'an and Luoyang, and even the tiles of the original White Horse Temple.

Besides towers, other ceramic models from the Han reveal a variety of building types. This includes multi-story storehouses such as granaries, courtyard houses with multi-story halls, kiosks, walled gate towers, mills, manufactories and workshops, animal pens, outhouses, and water wells. Even models of single-story farmhouses show a great amount of detail, including tiled roofs, courtyards, steps leading to walkways, farmyards with troughs and basins, parapets, and privies. Models of granaries and storehouses had tiled rooftops, dougong brackets, windows, and stilt supports raising them above ground level. Han models of water wells sometimes feature tiny tiled roofs supported by beams that house the rope pulley used for lifting the bucket.

=== Roads, bridges, and canals ===
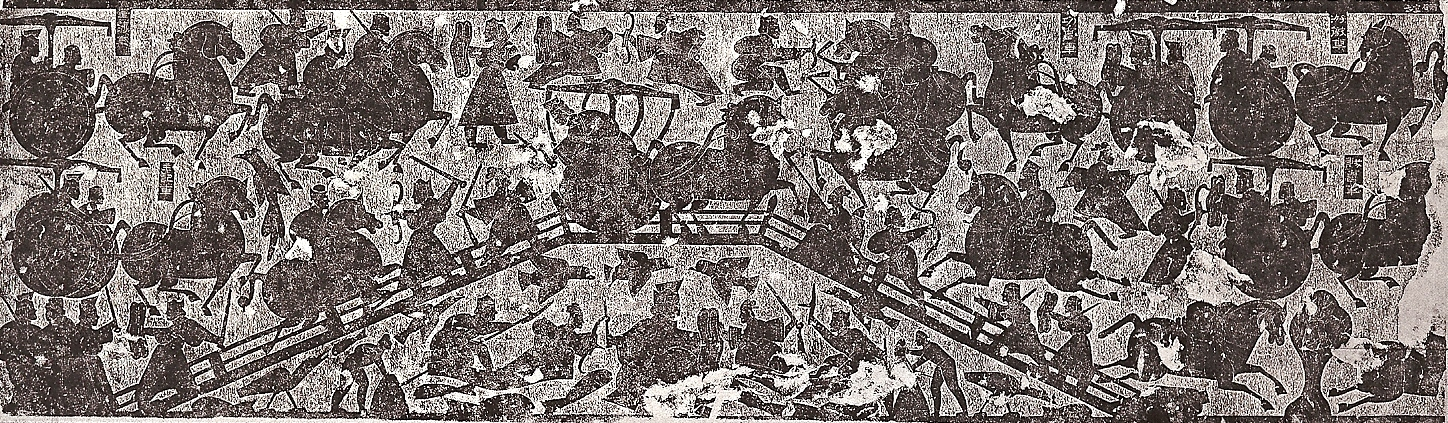
Rubbing detail from Stone Chamber 1 on the West Wall of the Wu family shrines in Shandong Province, China, showing a battle fought at a bridge crossing, dated 2nd century CE

In order to facilitate commerce and communication as well as speed the process of tax collection and movement of military troops, the Han government sponsored the building of new roads, bridges, and canal waterways. These include repairs and renovation work on the Dujiangyan Irrigation System of Sichuan and Zhengguo Canal of Shaanxi, both of which were built by the previous State of Qin. Accepting the proposal of Ni Kuan, in 111 BCE Emperor Wu commissioned Er to lead the project of creating extensions to the Zhengguo Canal that could irrigate nearby terrain elevated above the main canal. Since a large amount of silt had built up over time at the bottom of the Zhengguo Canal (causing flooding), in 95 BCE another project was initiated to tap irrigation waters from further up the Jing River, requiring the dredging of a new 100 km (62 mi) long canal following a contour line above the Zhengguo. The Han state also maintained a system of dikes to protect farmland from seasonal floods.

Roadways, wooden bridges, postal stations, and relay stations were occasionally repaired, while many new facilities such as these were established. As written by Han authors, roads built during the Han were tamped down with metal rammers, yet there is uncertainty over the materials used; Joseph Needham speculates that they were rubble and gravel. The widths of roads ranged from narrow footpaths where only a single horse or oxen could pass at once to large highways that could accommodate the simultaneous passage of nine horse-drawn chariots abreast. Fortified Han roadways were built as far west as Shanshan (Loulan) near the Lop Desert, while Han forces utilized routes that traversed north of the Taklamakan Desert towards Kashgar. A vast network of roads, fortified passes, and wooden bridges built over rushing torrents in steep gorges of the Qin Mountains was consolidated during the Han, known as the gallery roads. During the reign of Emperor Wu, roads were built to connect newly conquered territories in what is now Yunnan in the far southwest as well as the Korean Peninsula in the far northeast.

One of the most common bridge-types built during the Han was the wooden-trestle beam bridge, described by literary sources and seen in reliefs carved on tomb bricks. Evidence for arch bridges is elusive: one outside of Chengdu's south gate is claimed to date to the Han period, while that built by Ma Xian (Chinese: 馬賢) (fl. 135 CE) was certainly a beam bridge. A relief sculpture from a Han tomb in Sichuan province shows an arch bridge with a gradual curve, suggesting that it is segmental, although the use of such bridges are not entirely confirmed. Although there are rare references to simple suspension bridges in Han sources, these are only mentioned in connection with travels to foreign countries in the Himalaya, Hindukush and Afghanistan, demonstrating the antiquity of the invention there. Floating pontoon bridges made of boats secured by iron chains were built during the Han (some even spanning the Yellow River and Yangzi River) and were most often employed for military purposes since they could be easily assembled and then disassembled.

== Medicine ==
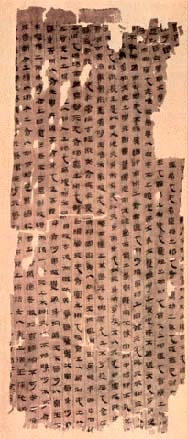
The Mawangdui Silk Texts, found in the Mawangdui, Changsha, Hunan province, provide information not only on astronomy and mythology, but also on Han-era medicine.

Much of the beliefs held by Han-era physicians are known to modern historians through such texts as the Yellow Emperor's Inner Canon (Huangdi neijing) medical corpus, which was compiled from the 3rd to 2nd century BCE and was mentioned in the Book of Later Han. It is clear from this text and others that their metaphysical beliefs in the five phases and yin and yang dictated their medical decisions and assumptions. The Han-era Chinese believed that each organ in the body was associated with one of the five phases (metal 金, wood 木, water 水, fire 火, earth 土) and had two circulatory qi channels (Chinese: 任督二脉). If these channels were disrupted, Han medical texts suggest that one should consume an edible material associated with one of these phases that would counteract the organ's prescribed phase and thus restore one's health. For example, the Chinese believed that when the heart—associated with the fire phase—caused one to become sluggish, then one should eat sour food because it was associated with the wood phase (which promoted fire). The Han Chinese also believed that by using pulse diagnosis, a physician could determine which organ of the body emitted "vital energy" (qi) and what qualities the latter had, in order to figure out the exact disorder the patient was suffering. Despite the influence of metaphysical theory on medicine, Han texts also give practical advice, such as the proper way to perform clinical lancing to remove an abscess. The Huangdi neijing noted the symptoms of people with various diseases of the liver, heart, spleen, lung, or kidneys in a 24-hour period, which was a recognition of circadian rhythm, although explained in terms of the five phases.

In his Essential Medical Treasures of the Golden Chamber (Jinkui yaolue), Zhang Zhongjing (c. 150 – c. 219 CE) was the first to suggest a regulated diet rich in certain vitamins could prevent different types of disease, an idea which led Hu Sihui (fl. 1314–1330) to prescribe a diet rich in Vitamin B_{1} as a treatment for beriberi. Zhang's major work was the Treatise on Cold Injury and Miscellaneous Disorders (Shanghan zabing lun). Hua Tuo (d. 208 CE) was a physician who had studied the Huangdi neijing and became knowledgeable in Chinese herbology. Hua Tuo used anesthesia on patients during surgery and created an ointment that was meant to fully heal surgery wounds within a month. In one diagnosis of an ill woman, he deciphered that she bore a dead fetus within her womb which he then removed, curing her of her ailments.

Historical sources say that Hua Tuo rarely practiced moxibustion and acupuncture. The first mentioning of acupuncture in Chinese literature appeared in the Huangdi neijing. Acupuncture needles made of gold were found in the tomb of the Han King Liu Sheng (d. 113 BCE). Some stone-carved depictions of acupuncture date to the Eastern Han Era (25–220 CE). Hua Tuo also wrote about the allegedly life-prolonging exercises of calisthenics. In the 2nd-century-BCE medical texts excavated from the Mawangdui, illustrated diagrams of calisthenic positions are accompanied by descriptive titles and captions. Vivienne Lo writes that the modern physical exercises of tai chi and qigong are derived from Han-era calisthenics.

== Cartography ==
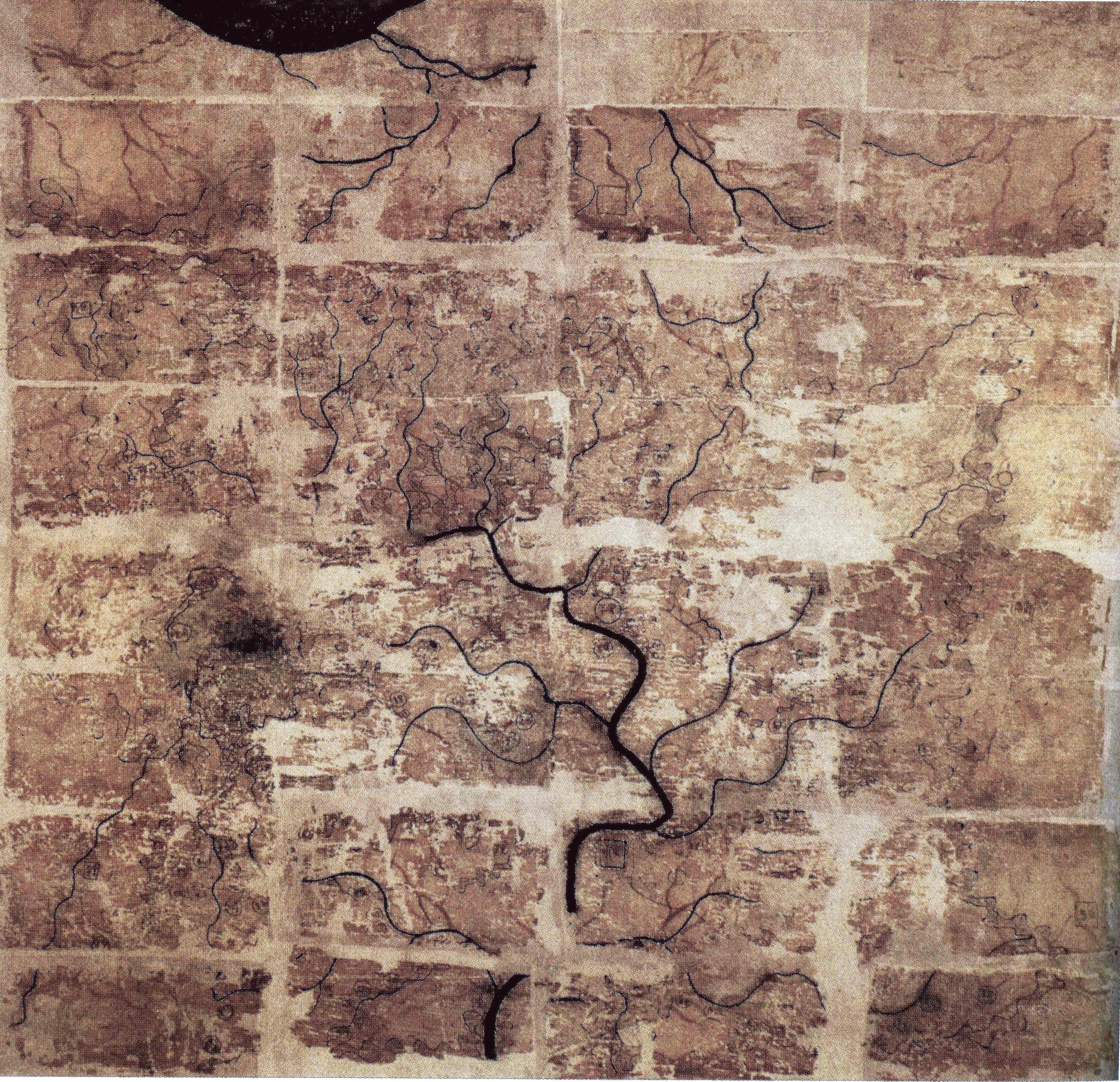
An early Western-Han silk map found in tomb 3 of Mawangdui Han tombs site, depicting the Kingdom of Changsha and Kingdom of Nanyue in southern China (note: the south direction is oriented at the top).

Map-making in China preceded the Han dynasty. Since two 4th-century-BCE silk maps from the State of Qin (found in Gansu, displaying the region about the Jialing River) show the measured distance between timber-gathering sites, Mei-ling Hsu argues that these are to be considered the first known economic maps (as they predate the maps of the Roman geographer Strabo, c. 64 BCE – 24 CE). Maps from the Han period have also been uncovered by modern archaeologists, such as those found with 2nd-century-BCE silk texts at Mawangdui. In contrast to the Qin maps, the Han maps found at Mawangdui employ a more diverse use of map symbols, cover a larger terrain, and display information on local populations and even pinpoint locations of military camps. One of the maps discovered at Mawangdui shows positions of Han military garrisons which were to attack Nanyue in 181 BCE.

In Chinese literature, the oldest reference to a map comes from 227 BCE. The Rites of Zhou (Zhouli), compiled during the Han and commented by Liu Xin in the 1st century CE, mentioned the use of maps for governmental provinces and districts, principalities, frontier boundaries, and locations of ores and minerals for mining facilities. The first Chinese gazetteer was written in 52 CE and included information on territorial divisions, the founding of cities, and local products and customs. Pei Xiu (224–271 CE) was the first to describe in detail the use of a graduated scale and geometrically plotted reference grid. However, historians Howard Nelson, Robert Temple, and Rafe de Crespigny argue that there is enough literary evidence that Zhang Heng's now lost work of 116 CE established the geometric reference grid in Chinese cartography (including a line from the Book of Later Han: "[Zhang Heng] cast a network of coordinates about heaven and earth, and reckoned on the basis of it"). Although there is speculation fueled by the report in Sima's Records of the Grand Historian that a gigantic raised-relief map representing the Qin Empire is located within the tomb of Qin Shi Huang, it is known that small raised-relief maps were created during the Han dynasty, such as one made out of rice by the military officer Ma Yuan (14 BCE – 49 CE).

== Nautics and vehicles ==
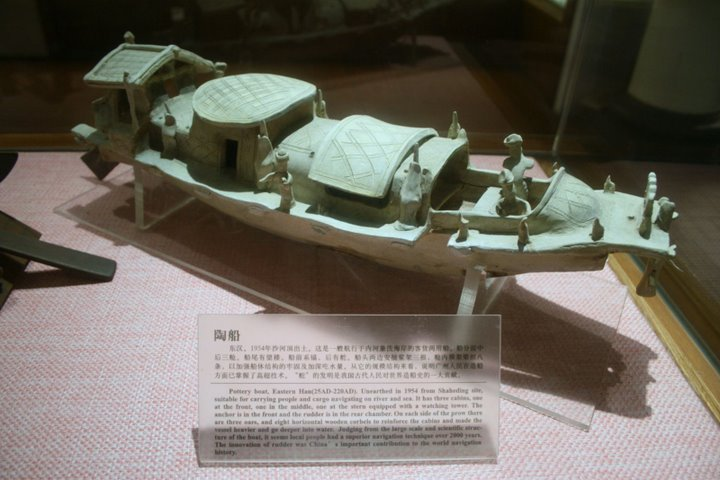
An Eastern-Han pottery ship model with a steering rudder at the stern and anchor at the bow

In 1975, an ancient shipyard discovered in Guangzhou is now dated to the late 3rd century BCE, made during either the Qin dynasty (221–206 BCE) or early Western Han dynasty. It had three large platforms capable of building wooden ships that were 30 m (98 ft) long, 8 m (26 ft) wide, and had a weight capacity of 60 metric tons. Another Han shipyard in what is now Anhui province had a government-operated maritime workshop where battle ships were assembled. The widespread use of iron tools during the Han dynasty was essential for crafting such vessels.

The southward expansion of the Han dynasty led to new trade routes and diplomatic contact with foreign kingdoms. In 111 BCE, Emperor Wu conquered the Kingdom of Nanyue in what is now modern northern Vietnam and Guangdong, Guangxi, Yunnan; thereafter he opened up maritime trade to both Southeast Asia and the Indian Ocean, as foreign merchants brought lapis lazuli, pearls, jade, and glasswares to the Han Empire. When a group of travelers from the Roman Empire (allegedly diplomats of Marcus Aurelius but most likely Roman merchants) came to the Han court in 166 CE, they allegedly came from this southern trade route. By at least the 1st century CE—as proven by Eastern Han ceramic miniature models of ships found in various tombs—the Chinese would have been able to brave distant waters with the new steering invention of the stern-mounted rudder. This came to replace the less efficient steering oar. While ancient China was home to various ship designs, including the layered and fortified tower ship meant for calm waters of lakes and river, the junk design (jun 船) created by the 1st century was China's first seaworthy sailing ship. The typical junk has a square-ended bow and stern, a flat-bottomed hull or carvel-shaped hull with no keel or sternpost, and solid transverse bulkheads in the place of structural ribs found in Western seacrafts. Since the Chinese junk lacked a sternpost, the rudder was attached to the back of the ship by use of either socket-and-jaw or block and tackle (which differed from the later European pintle and gudgeon design of the 12th century). According to a 3rd-century author, junks had for-and-aft rigs and lug sails.

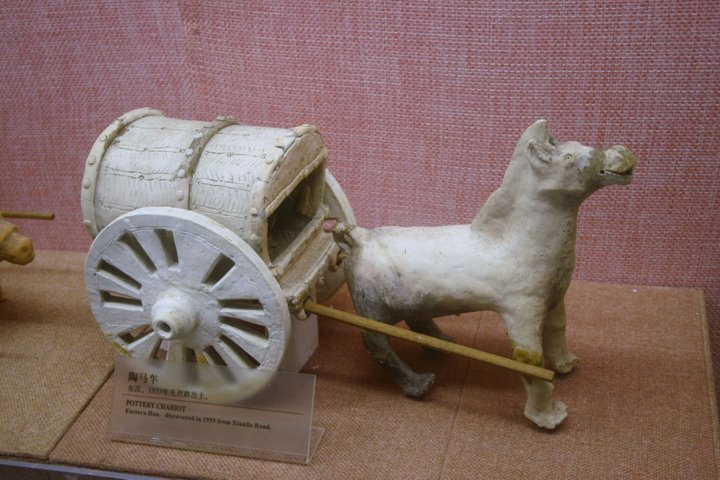
A pottery model of a horse-drawn, roofed chariot from the Eastern Han period

Although horse and ox-drawn carts and spoke-wheeled chariots had existed in China long before the Han dynasty, it was not until the 1st century BCE that literary evidence pointed to the invention of the wheelbarrow, while painted murals on Han tomb walls of the 2nd century CE show the wheelbarrow in use for hauling goods. While the 'throat-and-girth' harness was still in use throughout much of the ancient world (placing an excessive amount of pressure on horses' necks), the Chinese were placing a wooden yoke across their horses' chests with traces to the chariot shaft by the 4th century BCE in the State of Chu (as seen on a Chu lacquerware). By Han times, the Chinese replaced this heavy yoke with a softer breast strap. In the final stage of evolution, the modern horse collar was invented in China by the 5th century, during the Northern Wei period.

== Weaponry and war machines ==
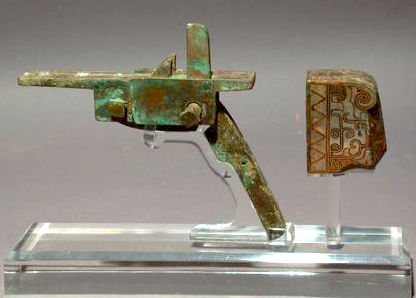
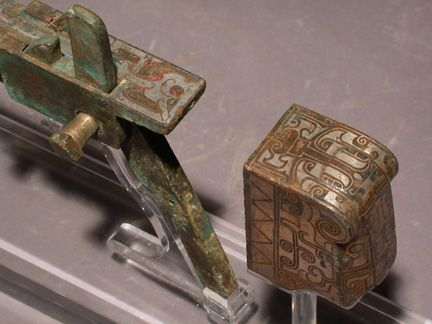
A Chinese crossbow trigger mechanism with a buttplate from either the late Warring States period or the early Han dynasty; made of bronze and inlaid with silver

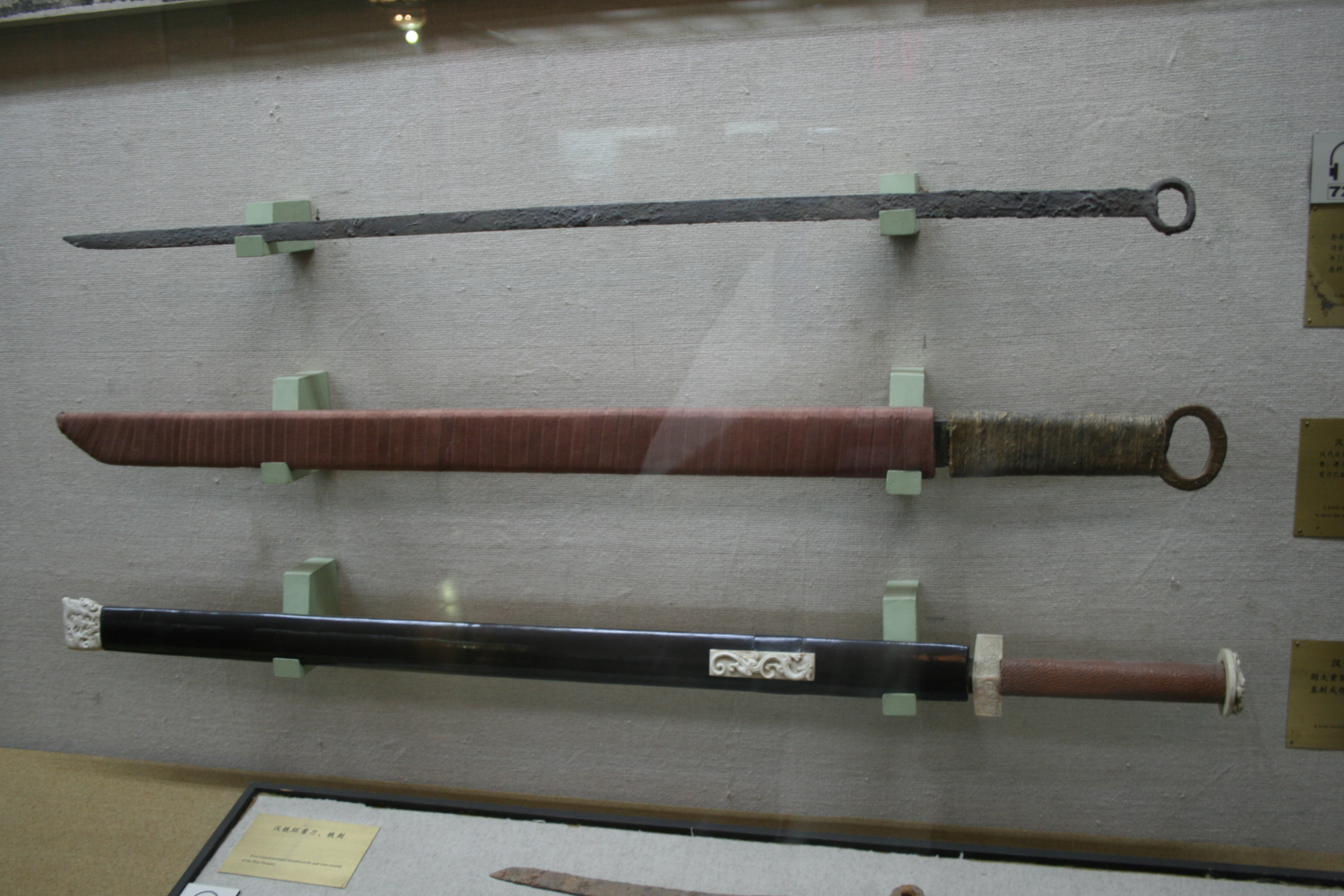
Han dynasty iron sword and replicas

The pivot catapult, known as the traction trebuchet, had existed in China since the Warring States period (as evidenced by the Mozi). It was regularly used during the Han dynasty by both besiegers and the besieged. The most common projectile weapon used during the Han dynasty was the small handheld, trigger-activated crossbow (and to a lesser extent, the repeating crossbow), invented in China during the 6th or 5th century BCE.

The Han Chinese also employed chemical warfare. In quelling a peasant revolt near Guiyang in 178 CE, the imperial Han forces had horse-drawn chariots carrying bellows that were used to pump powdered lime (calcium oxide) at the rebels. They also lit incendiary rags tied to the tails of horses, so that the frightened horses would rush through the enemy lines and disrupt their formations.

To deter pursuits of marching infantry or riding cavalry, the Han Chinese made caltrops (barbed iron balls with sharp spikes sticking out in all directions) that could be scattered on the ground and pierce the feet or hooves of those who were unaware of them.

== See also ==
- Chinese characters#Han dynasty
- List of Chinese discoveries
- List of Chinese inventions
- List of inventions and discoveries of Neolithic China
- History of science and technology in China
- Science and technology
