= Shennong Bencaojing =

3rd-century Chinese medical text

- Traditional Chinese: 神農本草經
- Simplified Chinese: 神农本草经
- Literal meaning: Shennong's Plant-Root Classic
Transcriptions
Standard Mandarin
- Hanyu Pinyin: Shénnóng Běncǎo Jīng
- Wade–Giles: Shen^{2}-nung^{2} Pen^{3}-ts'ao^{3} Ching^{1}
- IPA: [ʂə̌n.nʊ̌ŋ pə̀n.tsʰàʊ tɕíŋ]

Shennong Bencaojing (also Classic of the Materia Medica or Shen-nong's Herbal Classics and Shen-nung Pen-tsao Ching; Chinese: 神農本草經) is a Chinese book on agriculture and medicinal plants, traditionally attributed to Shennong. Researchers believe the text is a compilation of oral traditions, written between the first and second centuries AD. The original text no longer exists, but is said to have been composed of three volumes containing 365 entries on medicaments and their description.

== Content ==
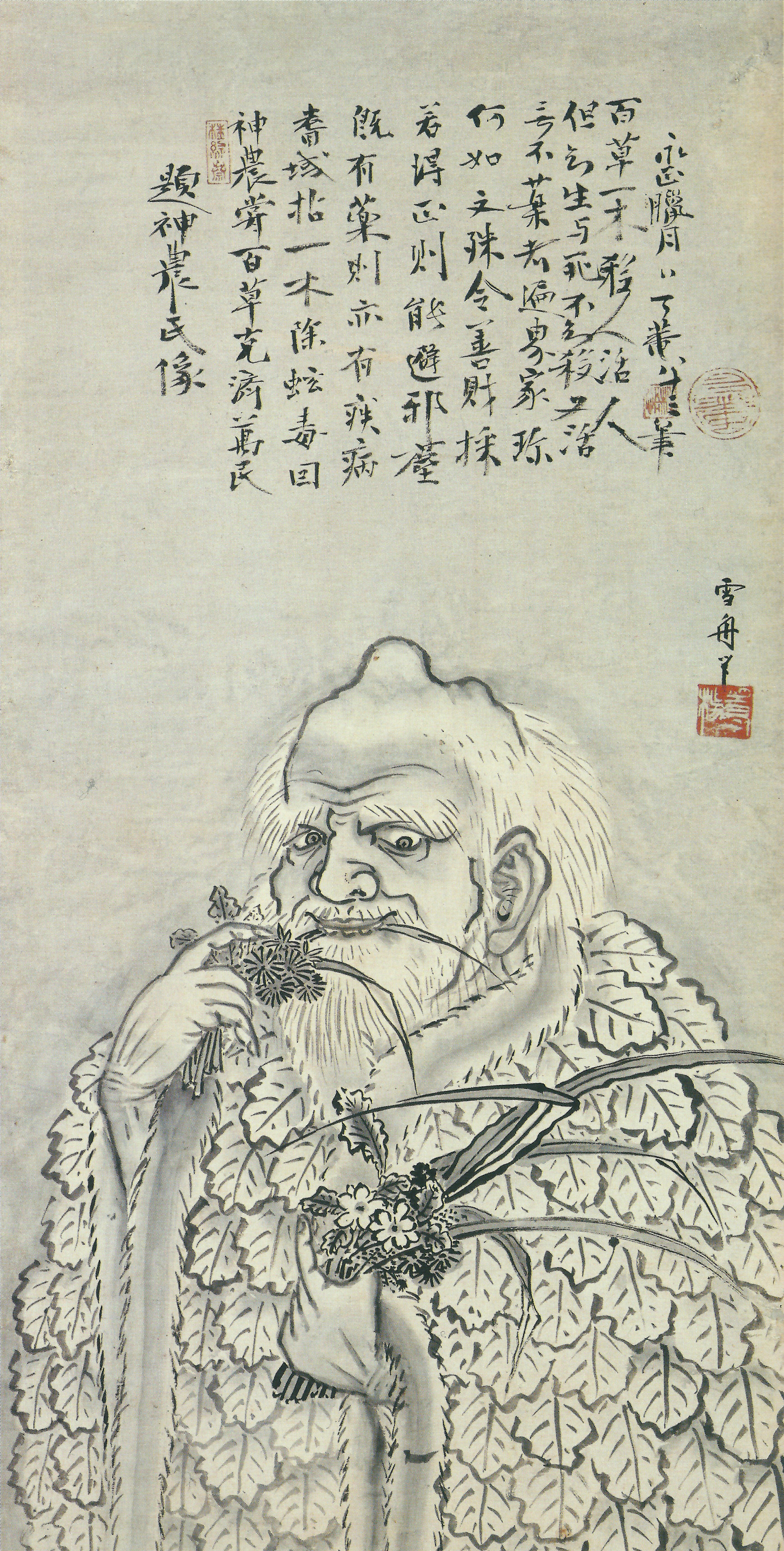
The farmer-god Shennong in a Japanese painting, chewing on herbs

The first volume of the treatise included 120 drugs harmless to humans, the "stimulating properties": lingzhi, ginseng, jujube, the orange, Chinese cinnamon, Eucommia bark, cannabis, or the root of liquorice (Glycyrrhiza uralensis). These herbs are described as "noble" or "upper herbs" (上品).

The second volume is devoted to 120 therapeutic substances intended to treat the sick, but have toxic, or potentially toxic properties of varying degrees. In this category are ginger, peonies and cucumber. The substances of this group are described as "human", "commoner", or "middle herbs" (中品).

In the last volume there are 125 entries corresponding to substances which have a strong or violent action on physiological functions and are often poisonous. Rhubarb root, and the kernel of apricot (xing ren) and kernel of peach (tao ren) are among those featured. These herbs are referred to as "low herbs" (下品).

== See also ==
- Shanghan lun, a forerunner text to the Ben Cao Jing composed by Zhang Zhongjing
- Chinese herbology

== Bibliography ==
- Jean-Baptiste Du Halde SJ (1735). "Description Géographique, Historique, Chronologique, Politique et Physique de l'Empire de la Chine et de la Tartarie chinoise" (in French).
- Unschuld, Paul U. (1986). Medicine in China: A history of Pharmaceutics. Berkeley: Univ. of California Pr. ISBN 9780520050259.
- Yang, Shou-zhong (1998). The Divine Farmer's Materia Medica: A Translation of the Shen Nong Ben Cao Jing. Boulder, CO: Blue Poppy Press. ISBN 9780936185965.
