= Taiyang =

Taiyang (Mandarin Chinese for "sun"), may refer to:

- Tai Yang, the initial and most external stage of disease progression in the Six Stages theory
- Taiyang Gold Mine Office, a former office building in Taiwan
- Taiyang River, a river in China
- Taiyang Subdistrict, a subdistrict of China
- Taiyang Xiao Long, Yang and Ruby's widowed father, see List of RWBY characters

== See also ==
- 太陽 (disambiguation)
