= Jue yin =

Concept in Traditional Chinese Medicine

Jue Yin Syndrome
- Other names: Reverting Yin, Absolute Yin
- Specialty: Traditional Chinese Medicine
- Symptoms: Alternating cold and heat, thirst with difficulty drinking, hunger without ability to eat, frequent or difficult urination, physical collapse, red tongue with slippery white coat, deep wiry pulse
- Causes: Deep penetration of pathogenic cold, yin deficiency
- Diagnostic method: Clinical evaluation based on TCM principles
- Treatment: Warming with supplementing, herbal formulas (e.g., Wu Mei Wan), acupuncture, moxibustion

Jue Yin, 厥陰 (Jué Yīn) translated as "Reverting Yin" or "Absolute Yin," is a critical concept in Traditional Chinese Medicine (TCM), representing the deepest stage of disease progression within the Six Channels theory. As outlined in the ancient text Shang Han Lun (Treatise on Cold Damage), Jue Yin signifies a severe imbalance of yin and yang, where vital energies are nearly depleted. This stage primarily affects the liver and pericardium meridians and is associated with advanced febrile diseases or profound exhaustion.

== Historical context ==
The Six Channels theory, introduced by Zhang Zhongjing in the Shang Han Lun during the Eastern Han Dynasty (circa 25–220 CE), categorizes disease progression through six stages: Taiyang, Yangming, Shaoyang, Taiyin, Shaoyin, and Jueyin. Jueyin, the final yin stage, indicates that pathogenic factors, often cold, have penetrated deeply, disrupting core regulatory systems. The concept is also referenced in the Huangdi Nei Jing (Yellow Emperor's Inner Classic), which emphasizes the balance of yin and yang for health.

== Symptoms ==
Jue Yin syndrome presents a distinct set of symptoms reflecting a critical yin-yang disharmony, as described in Traditional Chinese Medicine (TCM) texts:

- Alternating sensations of cold and heat: Indicates impaired temperature regulation due to disrupted yin-yang balance.
- Thirst with difficulty drinking: Patients experience thirst but may vomit after fluid intake, showing disrupted fluid metabolism.
- Hunger without ability to eat: Hunger is present, but eating causes discomfort or vomiting, signaling digestive collapse.
- Frequent or difficult urination: Reflects dysfunction in kidney and bladder fluid regulation.
- Physical weakness or collapse: Suggests severe depletion of vital qi (energy).
- Diagnostic signs: A red tongue with a slippery, white coat and a deep, wiry pulse are typical in TCM diagnostics.

These symptoms align with descriptions in classical TCM texts, indicating a body in crisis with faltering vital functions.

== Pathophysiology ==
In TCM, Jue Yin syndrome occurs when pathogenic cold or other external factors deeply infiltrate the body, overwhelming its defenses. This leads to a collapse of yang energy due to profound yin deficiency. The liver meridian, which stores blood, and the pericardium meridian, which protects the heart, are primarily affected. This disruption impairs the body’s ability to regulate temperature, fluids, and energy, resulting in the characteristic symptoms.

== Treatment ==
The primary treatment principle for Jue Yin syndrome in Traditional Chinese Medicine (TCM) is warming with supplementing, aimed at addressing the deep-seated cold and profound yin-yang imbalance characteristic of this stage. This approach involves:

- Warming the interior: Applying heat-inducing therapies to expel pathogenic cold that has penetrated the yin organs, particularly the liver and pericardium.
- Supplementing qi and yin: Restoring the body’s vital energy (qi) and yin fluids to counteract depletion and prevent collapse.
- Regulating meridians: Promoting the smooth flow of qi through the meridians to restore systemic balance, often using acupuncture or herbal interventions.

== Herbal formulas ==
The primary herbal formula for treating Jue Yin syndrome is Wu Mei Wan (Mume Pill), a classical prescription from the Shang Han Lun by Zhang Zhongjing. It is designed to warm the interior, expel cold, and address symptoms such as chronic diarrhea and physical collapse. Key ingredients include:

- Wu Mei (Prunus mume, Mume Fruit): Warms the intestines, astringes diarrhea, and addresses parasitic infections, a common concern in Jue Yin syndrome.
- Chuan Jiao (Zanthoxylum bungeanum, Sichuan Pepper): Warms the middle burner (digestive system) and disperses cold, supporting digestion.
- Xi Xin (Asarum sieboldii, Asarum): Relieves pain and expels cold, aiding in the restoration of yang energy.
- Gui Zhi (Cinnamomum cassia, Cinnamon Twig): Warms the channels, promotes qi circulation, and supports yang restoration.

Additional formulas may be prescribed based on individual symptom patterns. For example, Si Wu Tang (Four Substances Decoction) is used for blood deficiency, often seen in Jue Yin syndrome with signs like pallor or fatigue, while Gui Pi Tang (Restore the Spleen Decoction) addresses spleen and heart deficiencies, such as insomnia or palpitations. These formulas are tailored to the patient’s specific presentation, adhering to TCM’s individualized diagnostic approach.

=== Other modalities ===
- Acupuncture: Points like PC-6 (Neiguan) and LR-3 (Taichong) harmonize the pericardium and liver meridians.
- Moxibustion: Applies heat to stimulate qi flow and warm the body.

== Modern relevance ==
Jue Yin remains relevant in modern TCM, applied to severe or chronic conditions with compromised immune and regulatory systems. The World Health Organization’s 2007 International Standard Terminologies on Traditional Medicine standardized Jue Yin-related terms, aiding global integration. While TCM faces scrutiny in Western medicine for its empirical basis, its widespread use in East Asia and growing interest in integrative medicine highlight its clinical value.
