= Gao Ruona =

Song Chinese civil servant and physician

Gao Ruona (Chinese: 高若訥; pinyin: Gāo Ruònà; 997–1055) was a Song dynasty civil servant and physician.

== Early life ==
Gao was born in 997 in Yuci (榆次), Bingzhou (present-day Shanxi). His father died when he was ten years old. While having to look after his ailing mother, Gao managed to finish in the top three of his class for his jinshi examination in 1024.

== Career ==
After becoming a jinshi, Gao rose through the ranks in the civil service, holding positions such as canzhi zhengshi (參知政事; literally "Participant in Determining Government Affairs"), fu zaixiang (副宰相; "Vice Grand Councilor"), and shumi shi (樞密使; Military Affairs Commissioner). He aligned himself with Grand Councilor Lü Yijian, who had served for many years under Emperor Renzong of Song. Ouyang Xiu, who was Gao's colleague in the Song court, viewed Lü Yijian as a "careerist hack" and therefore "savagely lambasted" him for aligning himself with Lü. Ouyang himself was an ally of Fan Zhongyan, another high-ranking bureaucrat. Lü countered that Fan and his allies were "sowing discord between the ruler and his officials". Soon after, Fan, Ouyang, and several others were demoted and sent to the provinces. To commemorate this instance of palace intrigue, Cai Xiang later wrote the poem "Sixian yibuxiao" (四賢一不肖) or "Four Worthies and One Unworthy", with the "One Unworthy" referring to Gao.

Gao also studied and practised medicine. He had a particular interest in epidemics, which were referred to by Chinese medical officials as shanghan (傷寒) or "Cold Damage Disorders". At some point he read the Shanghan lun (傷寒論) or Treatise of Cold Damage Disorders, and wrote his own treatise modelled on it, titled Shanghan leiyao (傷寒類要) or Categorised Essentials of Cold Damage Disorders. However, it had a limited circulation because it was not printed.

In any case, Gao likely exerted significant influence on the agenda of the Song government's Jiaozheng yishu ju (校正醫書局) or Bureau for Editing Medical Texts, which oversaw the publication of numerous works related to Cold Damage Disorders. Gao was the father-in-law of the Bureau's chief editor. Gao's second son also became part of the editorial team, as did one of Gao's students.

Additionally, Gao was an antiquarian who had an interest in metrology. With the Song court's backing, he reconstructed many of the devices that Li Chunfeng had used to define the value of a chi.
