= Tai Yang =

Concept in Traditional Chinese Medicine

Tai Yang Syndrome
- Other names: Greater Yang
- Specialty: Traditional Chinese Medicine
- Symptoms: Chills, fevers, stiffness, headache, aversion to cold, no sweat (cold invasion) or perspiration (wind invasion)
- Types: Cold invasion, Wind invasion
- Causes: External pathogenic invasion (wind or cold)
- Diagnostic method: Clinical evaluation based on TCM principles
- Treatment: Inducing sweating, releasing exterior pathogens, herbal formulas (e.g., Ma Huang Tang, Gui Zhi Tang), acupuncture

Tai Yang syndrome, also known as "Greater Yang" (Chinese: 太陽), is the initial and most external stage of disease progression in the Six Stages theory of Traditional Chinese Medicine (TCM). As described in the Shang Han Lun (Treatise on Cold Damage) by Zhang Zhongjing, Tai Yang syndrome represents the body’s response to external pathogenic factors, such as wind or cold, affecting the Urinary Bladder and Small Intestine meridians. It is characterized by mild symptoms and is treated by inducing sweating to expel pathogens.

== Historical Context ==
Tai Yang syndrome is rooted in the Six Stages theory, introduced in the Shang Han Lun during the Eastern Han Dynasty (circa 25–220 CE). This framework categorizes disease progression through six meridians, with Tai Yang being the first and most superficial, reflecting an external invasion. The theory, also referenced in the Huangdi Nei Jing, emphasizes the balance of yin and yang to maintain health, with Tai Yang addressing early-stage imbalances.

== Symptoms ==
Tai Yang syndrome manifests through symptoms indicating an external pathogenic invasion:

- Chills and fevers: Reflecting the body’s defensive response to cold or wind.
- Stiffness and headache: Particularly in the neck and occiput, due to blocked qi in the Urinary Bladder meridian.
- Aversion to cold: A hallmark of exterior cold invasion.
- No sweat (cold invasion) or perspiration (wind invasion): Distinguishing between cold and wind patterns.
- Diagnostic signs: A thin, white tongue coat and a floating, tight pulse (cold) or floating, moderate pulse (wind) are typical in TCM diagnostics.

These symptoms align with descriptions in TCM texts, marking Tai Yang as a milder, early-stage condition.

== Pathophysiology ==
In TCM, Tai Yang syndrome occurs when external pathogens, typically wind or cold, invade the body’s surface, obstructing the flow of defensive qi (wei qi) in the Urinary Bladder and Small Intestine meridians. This leads to symptoms like chills and stiffness, as the body attempts to repel the pathogen. The cold invasion pattern is marked by a lack of sweating, while the wind invasion pattern involves perspiration due to weakened defensive qi.

== Treatment ==
The primary treatment principle for Tai Yang syndrome is inducing sweating to release exterior pathogens and restore qi flow:

- Releasing the exterior: Promoting sweating to expel wind or cold.
- Harmonizing nutritive and defensive qi: Restoring balance between internal and external energies.
- Warming the channels: Supporting qi circulation, particularly in cold invasion cases.

== Herbal Formulas ==
Herbal formulas for Tai Yang syndrome are selected based on the specific pattern of pathogenic invasion, as described in the Shang Han Lun. For cold invasion, Ma Huang Tang (Ephedra Decoction) is prescribed to induce sweating and release exterior cold. This formula includes Ma Huang (Ephedra sinica), which promotes sweating and disperses exterior cold, Gui Zhi (Cinnamomum cassia), which warms channels and supports yang energy, Xing Ren (Prunus armeniaca), which facilitates lung qi dispersion to relieve respiratory symptoms, and Gan Cao (Glycyrrhiza uralensis), which harmonizes the formula and mitigates harsh effects.<ref>{{cite journal |last=Chen |first=J. |title=Herbal Pharmacology in Traditional Chinese Medicine |journal=Journal of Ethnopharmacology |volume=140 |issue=3 |year=2012 |pages=489–497 |doi=10.

=== Other Modalities ===
- Acupuncture: Points such as LU-7 (Lieque) and LI-4 (Hegu) release the exterior and promote sweating.
- Cupping or Gua Sha: Used to relieve exterior stagnation and promote qi flow.

== Modern Relevance ==
Tai Yang syndrome remains a key diagnostic category in modern TCM, applied to early-stage conditions like the common cold or influenza. The World Health Organization’s 2007 International Standard Terminologies on Traditional Medicine has standardized related terms, facilitating global practice. While TCM faces challenges in Western validation due to its empirical basis, its practical application in integrative medicine underscores its value.
