= Jingui Yaolüe =

Jingui Yaolüe (simplified Chinese: 金匮要略; traditional Chinese: 金匱要略; pinyin: Jīnguì Yàolüè), Essential Prescriptions from the Golden Cabinet is a classic clinical book of traditional Chinese medicine written by Zhang Zhongjing (150-219) at the end of the Eastern Han dynasty and was first published in the Northern Song dynasty. It is one of the two standardized books extracted from the Shanghan Zabing Lun by later editors, the other being Shanghan Lun. The oldest known extant copy, believed to be bibliographically closest to the original, dates to 1340 and was printed with woodcuts in the early Ming dynasty.

There is an annotated English translation by Luo Xiwen, with three hundred modern case histories titled: Synopsis of Prescriptions of the Golden Chamber with 300 Cases. First published in 1995 by New World Press.
