= Taiyang River =

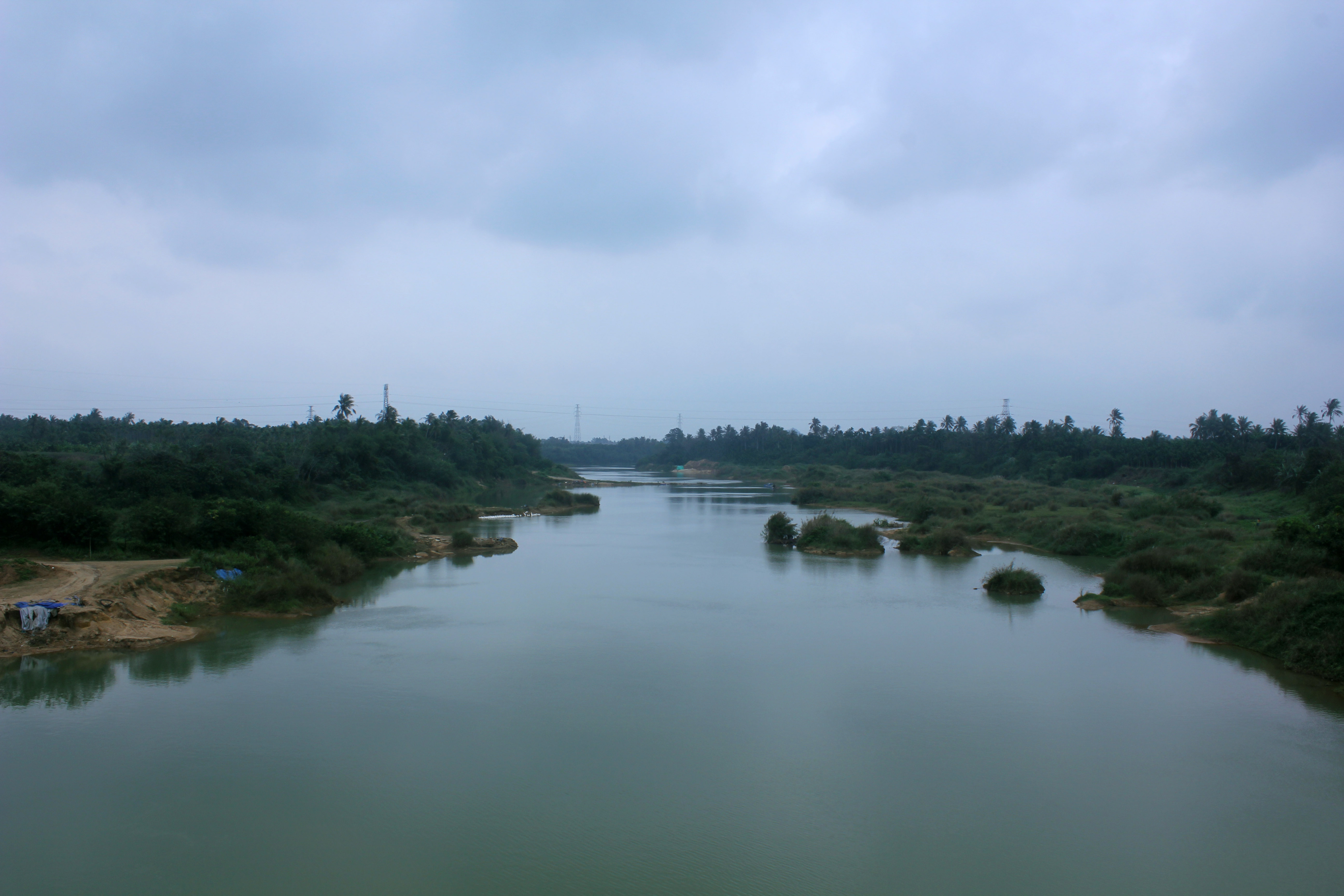
- Taiyang River in Wanning City.

Location
- Country: People's Republic of China

Physical characteristics
- Source
  - location: Hongding Mountain, Qiongzhong County, Hainan Province
  - elevation: 875 m (2,871 ft)
- Mouth
  - location: South China Sea
  - coordinates: 18°44′31″N 110°27′05″E
  - elevation: 0 m (0 ft)
- Length: 75.7 km (47.0 mi)
- Basin size: 592.51 km^{2} (228.77 sq mi)
- Discharge
  - average: 20.6 m^{3}/s (730 cu ft/s)

The Taiyang River (Chinese: 太阳河; pinyin: Tàiyáng Hé) is a river in Hainan Island, China. It rises in Hongding Mountain of southeastern Qiongzhong County and flows eastward across the Wanning City to empty into the South China Sea. The river has a length of 75.7 km and drains an area of 592.51 square km.
