= Shanghan Lun =

3rd century medical textbook by Zhang Zhongjing

A page from a printed edition of Shanghan Lun

The Shanghan Lun (traditional Chinese: 傷寒論; simplified Chinese: 伤寒论; pinyin: Shānghán Lùn), variously known in English as the Treatise on Cold Damage Diseases, Treatise on Cold Damage Disorders or the Treatise on Cold Injury is a part of Shanghan Zabing Lun (traditional Chinese: 傷寒雜病論; simplified Chinese: 伤寒杂病论; pinyin: Shānghán Zábìng Lùn). It is a Traditional Chinese medicine treatise that was compiled by Zhang Zhongjing sometime before 220 AD, at the end of the Han dynasty. It is amongst the oldest complete clinical textbooks in the world (cf. Carakasaṃhitā and the Hippocratic Corpus). It is considered one of the four canonical works of Traditional Chinese and Japanese medicine, along with Huang Di Nei Jing, Jin Gui Yao Lue, and Wen Bing Xue.

== Surviving editions ==
1. Song dynasty edition. Collated by scholastic ministers Gao Baohen, Lin Yi, and Sun Qi under the order of the emperor and published in 1065 AD. Reprinted in the Ming dynasty.
2. Cheng Wuji's Annotated Treatise on Cold Damage. Extensively read in Japan and China, was widely circulated in Cheng's time. However, many transcriptions and re-transcriptions have stirred up disagreement as to whether it is true to the original.
3. Classic of the Golden Chamber and Jade Sheath. This book has the same content as the Song edition with other minor variations in context.
4. Kang Ping edition. Kang Ping is the name of the period from 1058 to 1068 AD in the Kōhei era in Japan. It is indispensable for study because it retained the ancient style of typesetting dated back to the era at the end of the Han dynasty.

The Song edition is organized into ten volumes including the first two chapters on pulse diagnosis; Cheng's edition is also organized into ten volumes but simplified; Classic of the Golden Chamber and Jade Sheath is organized into eight volumes.

== Contents ==
The Shanghan Lun has 398 sections with 113 herbal prescriptions, organised into the Six Divisions corresponding to the six stages or pathogenesis of disease, according to the endogenous or exogenous relationships of Yin and Yang:

- Tai Yang (太陽, greater yang): a milder stage with external symptoms of chills, fevers, stiffness, and headache. Therapy/Treatment principle: sweating.
- Yang ming (陽明, yang brightness): a more severe internal excess yang condition with fever without chills, distended abdomen, and constipation. Therapy/Treatment Principle: cooling and eliminating.
- Shao yang (少陽, lesser yang): half exterior, half interior half excess and half deficiency with chest discomfort, alternating chills, and fever. Therapy/ Treatment Principle: harmonizing.
- Tai yin (太陰, greater yin): chills, distended abdomen with occasional pain. Therapy/Treatment Principle: warming with supplementing.
- Shao yin (少陰, lesser yin): weak pulse, anxiety, drowsiness, diarrhoea, chills, cold extremities. Therapy/Treatment Principle: warming with supplementing.
- Jue yin (厥陰, reverting yin/absolute yin): thirst, difficult urination, physical collapse. Therapy/Treatment Principle: warming with supplementing.

== See also ==
- Chinese herbology
- Chinese patent medicine
- Six levels
- Traditional Chinese Medicine
- Jingui Yaolüe, another surviving part of Shanghan Zabing Lun
