= Zhang Zhongjing =

Chinese physician and pharmacologist (150–219)

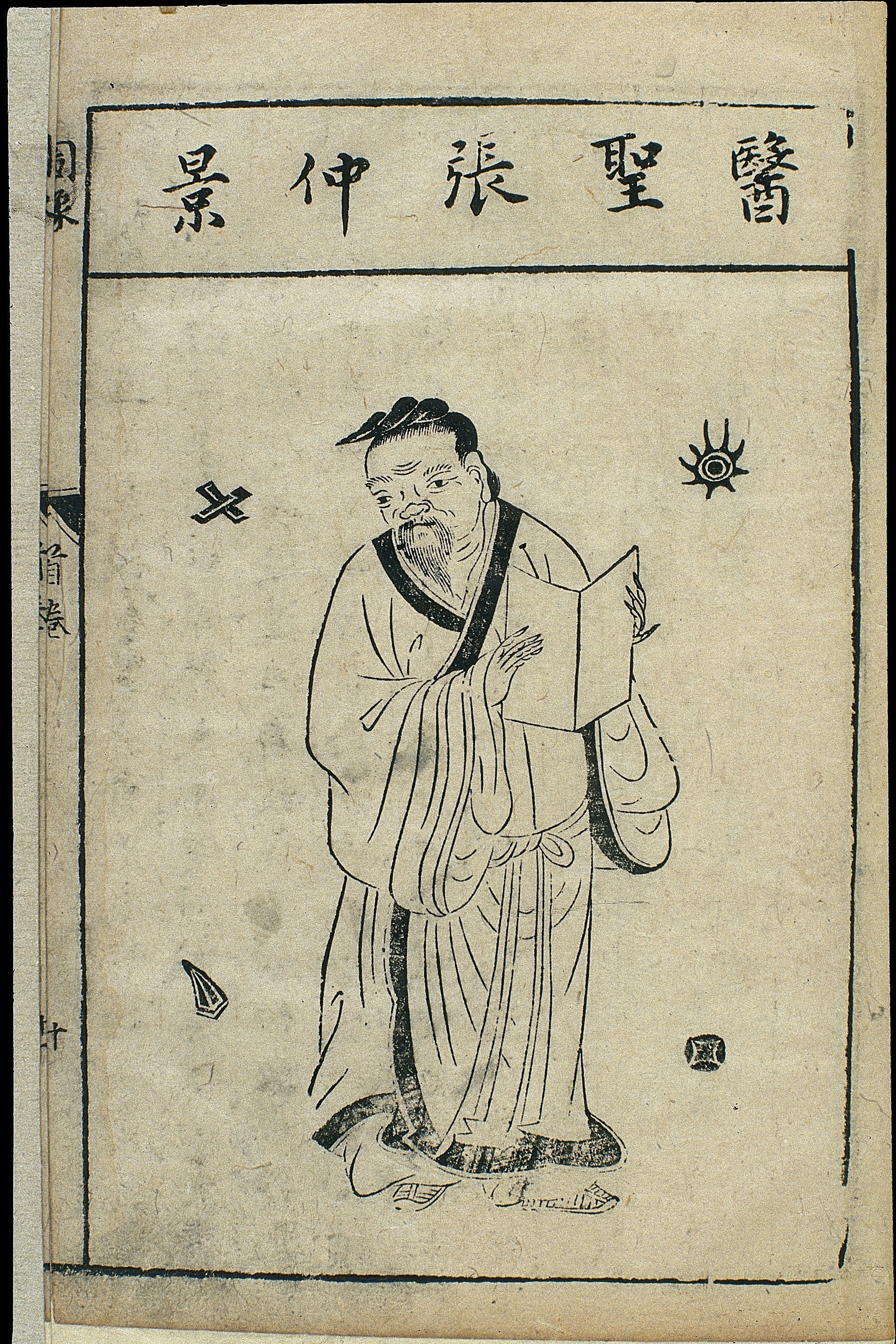
- Zhang Zhongjing
- Born: 150 CE (approx.)
- Died: 219 (aged 68–69)
- Occupations: Physician, pharmacologist, inventor, writer

Zhang Zhongjing
- Traditional Chinese: 張仲景
- Simplified Chinese: 张仲景
Transcriptions
Standard Mandarin
- Hanyu Pinyin: Zhāng Zhòngjǐng
- Wade–Giles: Chang^{1} Chung^{4}-ching^{3}
- IPA: [ʈʂáŋ ʈʂʊ̂ŋ.tɕìŋ]

Zhang Ji
- Traditional Chinese: 張機
- Simplified Chinese: 张机
Transcriptions
Standard Mandarin
- Hanyu Pinyin: Zhāng Jī

Zhang Zhongjing (Chinese: 張仲景; 150–219), formal name Zhang Ji (張機), was a Chinese pharmacologist, physician, inventor, and writer of the Eastern Han dynasty and one of the most eminent Chinese physicians during the later years of the Han dynasty. He established medication principles and summed up the medicinal experience until that time, thus making a considerable contribution to the development of Traditional Chinese Medicine.

== Biography ==
Though well known in modern Chinese medicine and considered one of the finest Chinese physicians in history, very little is known about his life. According to later sources, he was born in Nanyang, held an official position in Changsha and lived from approximately 150 to 219 AD. Exact dates regarding his birth, death and works vary, but an upper limit of 220 AD is generally accepted.

It is also speculated that he created jiaozi (餃子 - gyoza / dumplings / guōtiē; potstickers) to help people with frostbitten ears.

During his time, with warlords fighting for their own territories, many people fell victim to infectious diseases. Zhang's family was no exception. He learned medicine by studying from his towns fellow and later teacher Zhang Bozu, assimilating from previous medicinal literature such as Yellow Emperor's Inner Classic Huangdi Neijing (黄帝内經), and collecting many prescriptions elsewhere, finally writing the medical masterpiece Shanghan Zabing Lun (Chinese: 傷寒雜病論; pinyin: Shānghán Zábìng Lùn, lit. "Treatise on Cold Pathogenic and Miscellaneous Diseases"). Zhang Zhongjing systematically documented 113 herbal formulae and 397 therapeutic strategies in the Treatise.Shortly after its publication, the book was lost during the wars that ravaged China during the period of the Three Kingdoms. Because of Zhang's contribution to traditional Chinese medicine, he is often regarded as the sage of Chinese medicine.

Zhang's masterpiece, Shanghan Zabing Lun, was collected and organised later by physicians, notably Wang Shuhe (王叔和) from the Jin (晋) Dynasty and various court physicians during the Song dynasty (宋) into two books, namely for the former, the Shang Han Lun (傷寒論, lit. "On Cold Damage"), which was mainly on a discourse on how to treat epidemic infectious diseases causing fevers prevalent during his era, and the latter, the Jingui Yaolüe (金櫃要略, lit. "Essential Prescriptions of the Golden Coffer"), a compendium of various clinical experiences which was regarded as a main discourse on internal diseases. These two texts have been heavily reconstructed several times up to the modern era. Revered for authoring the Shāng Hán Zá Bìng Lùn, Zhang Zhongjing is considered to have founded the Cold Damage or "Cold Disease" school of Chinese medicine and is widely considered the seminal expert to this day.

== Influence ==
Zhang Zhongjing left behind Zhang Zhongjing Liu Wei Di Huang Wan. There is also the Medical Sage Temple (医圣祠) in Nanyang, which is a place to commemorate Zhang Zhongjing. Zhang Zhongjing's treatment of diseases has unique effects. The key points of his medication are to be precise, concise, and straight to the condition. Unlike modern Chinese medicine, which uses Western medicine's way of thinking and logic to treat diseases. Zhang Zhongjing is a role model and model of learning for later generations of Chinese medicine.

== See also ==
- Chinese herbology
- Traditional Chinese medicine
