= History of herbalism =

The history of herbalism is closely tied with the history of medicine from prehistoric times up until the development of the germ theory of disease in the 19th century. Modern medicine from the 19th century to today has been based on evidence gathered using the scientific method. Evidence-based use of pharmaceutical drugs, often derived from medicinal plants, has largely replaced herbal treatments in modern health care. However, many people continue to employ various forms of traditional or alternative medicine. These systems often have a significant herbal component. The history of herbalism also overlaps with food history, as many of the herbs and spices historically used by humans to season food yield useful medicinal compounds, and use of spices with antimicrobial activity in cooking is part of an ancient response to the threat of food-borne pathogens.

== Prehistory ==
The use of plants as medicines far predates written human history. Hominids other than Homo, including orangutans, have been known to treat illness or injury with medicinal plants.

Archaeological plant samples gathered from prehistoric burial sites indicate that Neanderthals were using medicinal plants during the Paleolithic, approximately 60,000 years ago. Analysis of the burial site Shanidar IV, in northern Iraq has yielded large amounts of pollen from 8 plant species, 7 of which are used now as herbal remedies. Paul B. Pettitt has argued that "the pollen was deposited by the burrowing rodent Meriones tersicus, which is common in the Shanidar microfauna and whose burrowing activity can be observed today". Evidence has also been found at El Sidrón of Neanderthals self-medicating over 48,000 years ago with poplar as an anti-inflammatory, and Penicillium rubens was also found in their microbiome.

Medicinal herbs were found in the personal effects of Ötzi the Iceman, whose body was frozen in the Ötztal Alps for more than 5,000 years. These herbs appear to have been used to treat the parasites found in his intestines.

== Ancient history ==
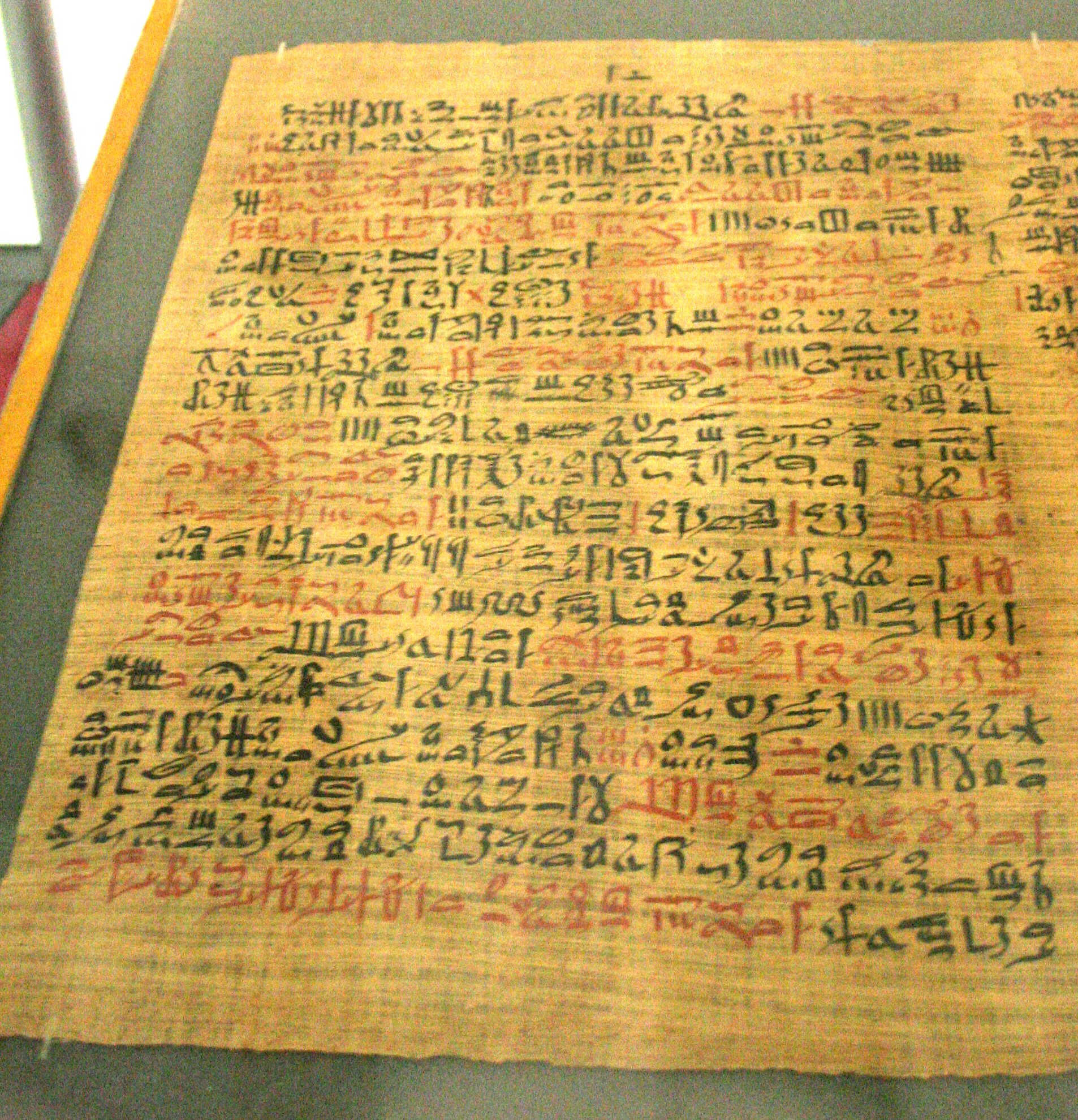
The Ebers Papyrus (c. 1550 BCE) from ancient Egypt has a prescription for Cannabis sativa (marijuana) applied topically for inflammation.

=== Mesopotamia ===
In Mesopotamia, the written study of herbs dates back over 5,000 years to the Sumerians, who created clay tablets with lists of hundreds of medicinal plants (such as myrrh and opium).

=== Ancient Egypt ===
Ancient Egyptian texts are of particular interest due to the language and translation controversies that accompany texts from this era and region. These differences in conclusions stem from the lack of complete knowledge of the Egyptian language: many translations are composed of mere approximations between Egyptian and modern ideas, and there can never be complete certainty of meaning or context. While physical documents are scarce, texts such as the Papyrus Ebers serve to illuminate and relieve some of the conjecture surrounding ancient herbal practices. The Papyrus consists of lists of ailments and their treatments, ranging from "disease of the limbs" to "diseases of the skin" and has information on over 850 plant medicines, including garlic, juniper, cannabis, castor bean, aloe, and mandrake. Treatments were mainly aimed at ridding the patient of the most prevalent symptoms because the symptoms were largely regarded as the disease itself. Knowledge of the collection and preparation of such remedies are mostly unknown, as many of the texts available for translation assume the physician already has some knowledge of how treatments are conducted and therefore such techniques would not need restating. Though modern understanding of Egyptian herbals stem from the translation of ancient texts, there is no doubt that trade and politics carried the Egyptian tradition to regions across the world, influencing and evolving many cultures medical practices and allowing for a glimpse into the world of ancient Egyptian medicine. Herbs used by Egyptian healers were mostly indigenous in origin, although some were imported from other regions like Lebanon. Other than papyri, evidence of herbal medicine has also been found in tomb illustrations or jars containing traces of herbs.

=== India ===
In India, Ayurveda medicine has used many herbs such as turmeric possibly as early as 1,000 BC. Earliest Sanskrit writings such as the Rig Veda, and Atharva Veda are some of the earliest available documents detailing the medical knowledge that formed the basis of the Ayurveda system. Many other herbs and minerals used in Ayurveda were later described by ancient Indian herbalists such as Charaka and Sushruta during the 1st millennium BC. The Sushruta Samhita attributed to Sushruta in the 6th century BC describes 700 medicinal plants, 64 preparations from mineral sources, and 57 preparations based on animal sources.

=== China ===
In China, seeds likely used for herbalism have been found in the archaeological sites of Bronze Age China dating from the Shang dynasty. The mythological Chinese emperor Shennong is said to have written the first Chinese pharmacopoeia, the "Shennong Ben Cao Jing". The "Shennong Ben Cao Jing" lists 365 medicinal plants and their uses—including Ephedra (the shrub that introduced the drug ephedrine to modern medicine), hemp, and chaulmoogra (one of the first effective treatments for leprosy). Succeeding generations augmented on the Shennong Bencao Jing, as in the Yaoxing Lun (Treatise on the Nature of Medicinal Herbs), a 7th-century Tang dynasty treatise on herbal medicine.

=== Ancient Greece and Rome ===
==== Hippocrates ====
The Hippocratic Corpus serves as a collection of texts that are associated with the 'Father of Western Medicine', Hippocrates of Kos. Though the actual authorship of some of these texts is disputed, each reflects the general ideals put forth by Hippocrates and his followers. The recipes and remedies included in parts of the Corpus no doubt reveal popular and prevalent treatments of the early ancient Greek period.

Though any of the herbals included in the Corpus are similar to those practiced in the religious sectors of healing, they differ strikingly in the lack of rites, prayers, or chants used in the application of remedies. This distinction is truly indicative of the Hippocratic preference for logic and reason within the practices of medicine.

The ingredients mentioned in the Corpus consist of a myriad of herbs, both local to Greece and imported from exotic locales such as Arabia. While many imported goods would have been too expensive for common household use, some of the suggested ingredients include the more common and cheaper elderberries and St. John's Wort.

==== Galen ====
Galen of Pergamon, a Greek physician practicing in Rome, was certainly prolific in his attempt to write down his knowledge on all things medical—and in his pursuit, he wrote many texts regarding herbs and their properties, most notably his Works of Therapeutics. In this text, Galen outlines the merging of each discipline within medicine that combine to restore health and prevent disease. While the subject of therapeutics encompasses a wide array of topics, Galen's extensive work in the humors and four basic qualities helped pharmacists to better calibrate their remedies for the individual person and their unique symptoms.

==== Diocles of Carystus ====
The writings of Diocles of Carystus were also extensive and prolific in nature. With enough prestige to be referred to as "the second Hippocrates", his advice in herbalism and treatment was to be taken seriously. Though the original texts no longer exist, many medical scholars throughout the ages have quoted Diocles rather extensively, and it is in these fragments that we gain knowledge of his writings. It is purported that Diocles actually wrote the first comprehensive herbal- this work then cited numerous times by contemporaries such as Galen, Celsus, and Soranus.

==== Pliny ====
In what is one of the first encyclopedic texts, Pliny the Elder's Natural History serves as a comprehensive guide to nature and also presents an extensive catalog of herbs valuable in medicine. With over 900 drugs and plants listed, Pliny's writings provide a very large knowledge base upon which we may learn more about ancient herbalism and medical practices. Pliny himself referred to ailments as "the greatest of all the operations of nature," and the act of treatment via drugs as impacting the "state of peace or of war which exists between the various departments of nature".

==== Dioscorides ====
Much like Pliny, Pedanius Dioscorides constructed a pharmacopeia, De Materia Medica, consisting of over 1000 medicines produced form herbs, minerals, and animals. The remedies that comprise this work were widely utilized throughout the ancient period and Dioscorides remained the greatest expert on drugs for over 1,600 years.

Similarly important for herbalists and botanists of later centuries was Theophrastus' Historia Plantarum, written in the 4th century BC, which was the first systematization of the botanical world.

== Middle Ages ==
While there are certainly texts from the medieval period that denote the uses of herbs, there has been a long-standing debate between scholars as to the actual motivations and understandings that underline the creation of herbal documents during the medieval period. The first point of view dictates that the information presented in these medieval texts were merely copied from their classical equivalents without much thought or understanding. The second viewpoint, which is gaining traction among modern scholars, states that herbals were copied for actual use and backed by genuine understanding.

Medical writers and students of medicine in the 5th century based their knowledge of herbalism on the classical text and practices shared among scholars their majority of knowledge of plants, plant names, and plant lore. Most botanical classical texts were shared by the Greek or Latin language. Eventually, when herbalism became a subtopic of modern medicine the Greeks and Romans studied herbalism. They had to transition their knowledge of these important medicinal herbs to not only document but they had to understand the process of herbalism that happened over many centuries. This was not without its challenges because herbalists in the 5th–10th century found difficulties due to the lack of knowledge of herbalism that had not been discovered and studied thoroughly. The earliest record of herbalism first was recorded in the first-century BC in western Europe. The importance of herbalism in the Middle Ages was not only crucial to survival without prescription drugs such as those used today but was the learning base of natural remedies we still use in modern times. Knowledge of the practice of Herbalism has been around since the Stone Age. Plant medicine plays an important role in how medicine was also developed throughout history.

Some evidence for the suggestion that herbals were utilized with knowledgeable intent, was the addition of several chapters of plants, lists of symptoms, habitat information, and plant synonyms added to texts such as the Herbarium. Notable texts utilized in this time period include Bald's Leechbook, the Lacnunga, the peri didaxeon, Herbarium Apulei, De Taxone, and Medicina de Quadrupedibus, while the most popular during this time period were the Ex Herbis Femininis, the Herbarius, and works by Dioscorides. Dioscorides was a Greek physician and botanist in 50 AD who devoted his life's work to understanding plants and the use of their properties in medicine. In the Middle Ages, Dioscoride's work was the primary resource about plants and the use of their properties. Dioscorides was privileged enough to have writing skills and he is an important figure in herbalism because he traveled, studied, and wrote his knowledge about herbalism. Originally these texts were five volumes written in Greek, but then later Dioscorides transcribed them in Latin, and they are called "De materia medica". These texts written by Dioscorides are important because they are the first physical text about herbalism in the 5th-century and this text would be the base of knowledge about herbalism in western Europe at that time. The Herbal medical documents provided sufficient information about herbs, their colors, and their uses.

Most knowledge about herbalism comes from the Middle East and Asia, where Discordies traveled back and forth for research to conduct new studies on herbalism. During his research, he wrote about many other foreign herbs and plants that came from Asia. This was an important contribution not only to the growing knowledge of herbalism but to trade throughout Europe from the early 5th century to the 10th century. Dioscorides found these different herbs fascinating for their healing powers because he had never seen them before, and it sparked an idea of how these herbs could make a new impact on natural medicine. When he traveled to the West he learned about dried portions of herbs, better known as the spice trade. Dioscorides wrote these medical documents, and this brought herbalists together comprehensively during the Middle Ages. The plants grew primarily in the southern part of Europe, such as Italy and Greece. A unique property is that these herbs were not only grown on land but a new variety of herbs could be found closer to the sea.

In the early 5th century without documentation, it was difficult to have concrete information about these herbs and their useful properties that were not documented by historians. Discordies volumes provided information about the useful properties and warnings about poisonous plants and their geographical extent. Many herbalists did not know how crucial it was to note that certain herbs could only grow in certain areas. This is why the spice trade played a major role in the medical development during medieval times because certain herbs that had healing properties had to be traded due to the lack of socioeconomic or climatic factors in that region. This would significantly expand the knowledge of scholars unfamiliar with plants that grew in other regions. The writing and knowledge of Dioscorides volumes helped identify each plant and described its properties, use, and color.

A few examples of foreign herbs/plants that were unfamiliar in the west are citrus, ginger, echinacea, and goldenseal. These examples were not native to places like Britain and only grew in Asia. Nevertheless, these herbs/plants were grown and native to Asia, but the spice led to many herbs and plants being important from the East, and that expanded new knowledge to herbalists. The most essential herbs that were used in the Middle Ages are elderberry, wild sage, rosehips, plantain, calendula, comfrey, yarrow, nettle, and many more. Each of these herbs has specific properties that herbalists used to cure their patients, not unlike natural remedies such as healing teas and ointments used in today's age to treat common colds and minor injuries. The ingredients may be altered but the origin is from herbalists in the Middle Ages.

The majority of the herbs that were gathered and used in the Middle Ages were wild-grown, wild-grown means herbs that were not processed and cultivated straight from the earth. Those that were studied would be somewhat processed to see the results of their beneficial properties. Herbs that typically grew in the wild were accessible to the local population therefore, herbalism was a field not only dominated by scholars. Not only did Herbalists find the use of wild-grown herbs, but they also found the use of natural herbs that acted as drugs for major surgeries or for psychoactive use. Cannabis was first sold in Egypt and then imported to countries such as Great Britain, France, and Italy. The use of cannabis became larger when they found its healing properties for anxiety, pain, etc. Herbalists also used opioids for pain remedies. Not only did herbalists use herbs for minor illnesses and injuries, they also used herbs for drugs, major surgery, and psychoactive use. The late Middle Ages in the 10th century showed an increase in herbs being used in different forms. Interest in herbalism only increased after the 10th century, all examples are in use today: essential oils, ointments, etc. These new forms of medicines were both used for treating illness and for daily use.

Benedictine monasteries were the primary source of medical knowledge in Europe and England during the Early Middle Ages. However, most of these monastic scholars' efforts were focused on translating and copying ancient Greco-Roman and Arabic works, rather than creating substantial new information and practices. Many Greek and Roman writings on medicine, as on other subjects, were preserved by hand copying of manuscripts in monasteries. The monasteries thus tended to become local centers of medical knowledge, and their herb gardens provided the raw materials for simple treatment of common disorders.One of the most famous women in the herbal tradition was Hildegard of Bingen. A 12th-century Benedictine nun, she wrote a medical text called Causae et Curae. During this time, herbalism was mainly practiced by women, particularly among Germanic tribes. At the same time, folk medicine in the home and village continued uninterrupted, supporting numerous wandering and settled herbalists. Among these were the "wise-women" and "wise men", who prescribed herbal remedies often along with spells, enchantments, divination and advice.

There were three major sources of information on healing at the time including the Arabian School, Anglo-Saxon leechcraft, and Salerno. A great scholar of the Arabian School was Avicenna, who wrote The Canon of Medicine which became the standard medical reference work of the Arab world. "The Canon of Medicine is known for its introduction of systematic experimentation and the study of physiology, the discovery of contagious diseases and sexually transmitted diseases, the introduction of quarantine to limit the spread of infectious diseases, the introduction of experimental medicine, clinical trials, and the idea of a syndrome in the diagnosis of specific diseases. ...The Canon includes a description of some 760 medicinal plants and the medicine that could be derived from them." With Leechcraft, though bringing to mind part of their treatments, leech was the English term for medical practitioner. Salerno was a famous school in Italy centered around health and medicine. A student of the school was Constantine the African, credited with bringing Arab medicine to Europe.

== Translation of herbals ==
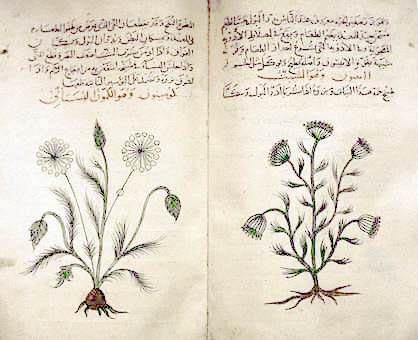
Dioscorides’ Materia Medica, c. 1334 copy in Arabic, describes medicinal features of cumin and dill.

During the Middle Ages, the study of plants began to be based on critical observations. "In the 16th and 17th century an interest in botany revived in Europe and spread to America by way of European conquest and colonization." Philosophers started to act as herbalists and academic professors studied plants with great depth. Herbalists began to explore the use of plants for both medicinal purposes and agricultural uses. Botanists in the Middle Ages were known as herbalists; they collected, grew, dried, stored, and sketched plants. Many became experts in identifying and describing plants according to their morphology and habitats, as well as their usefulness. These books, called herbals included beautiful drawings and paintings of plants as well as their uses.

At that time both botany and the art of gardening stressed the utility of plants for man; the popular herbal, described the medical uses of plants. During the Middle Ages, there was an expansion of book culture that spread through the medieval world. The phenomenon of translation is well-documented, from its beginnings as a scholarly endeavor in Baghdad as early as the eighth century to its expansion throughout European Mediterranean centers of scholarship by the eleventh and twelfth centuries. The process of translation is collaborative effort, requiring a variety of people to translate and add to them. However, how the Middle Ages viewed nature seems to be a mystery.

Translation of text and image has provided numerous versions and compilations of individual manuscripts from diverse sources, old and new. Translation is a dynamic process as well as a scholarly endeavor that significantly contributed to science in the Middle Ages; the process naturally entailed continuous revisions and additions.

Knowledge of medieval botanicals was closely related to medicine because the plant's principal use was for remedies. Herbals were structured by the names of the plants, identifying features, medicinal parts of plant, therapeutic properties, and some included instructions on how to prepare and use them. For medical use of herbals to be effective, a manual was developed. Dioscorides' De material medica was a significant herbal designed for practical purposes.

Theophrastus wrote more than 200 papers describing the characteristics of over 500 plants. He developed a classification system for plants based on their morphology such as their form and structure. He described in detail pepper, cinnamon, bananas, asparagus, and cotton. Two of his best-known works, Enquiry into Plants and The Causes of Plants, have survived for many centuries and were translated into Latin. He has been referred to as the "grandfather of botany". Crateuas was the first to produce a pharmacological book for medicinal plants, and his book influenced medicine for many centuries. A Greek physician, Pedanius Dioscorides described over 600 different kinds of plants and describes their useful qualities for herbal medicine, and his illustrations were used for pharmacology and medicine as late as the Renaissance years.

Monasteries established themselves as centers for medical care. Information on these herbals and how to use them was passed on from monks to monks, as well as their patients. These illustrations were of no use to everyday individuals; they were intended to be complex and for people with prior knowledge and understanding of herbal. The usefulness of these herbals have been questioned because they appear to be unrealistic and several plants are depicted claiming to cure the same condition, as “the modern world does not like such impression." When used by experienced healers, these plants can provide their many uses. For these medieval healers, no direction was needed their background allowed them to choose proper plants to use for a variety of medical conditions. The monk's purpose was to collect and organize text to make them useful in their monasteries. Medieval monks took many remedies from classical works and adapted them to their own needs as well as local needs. This may be why none of the collections of remedies we have presently agrees fully with another.

Another form of translation was oral transmission; this was used to pass medical knowledge from generation to generation. A common misconception is that one can know early medieval medicine simply by identifying texts, but it is difficult to compose a clear understanding of herbals without prior knowledge. There are many factors that played in influenced in the translation of these herbals, the act of writing or illustrating was just a small piece of the puzzle, these remedies stems from many previous translations the incorporated knowledge from a variety of influences.

== Early modern era ==
The second millennium saw the beginning of a slow erosion of the pre-eminent position held by plants as sources of therapeutic effects. This began with the Black Death, which the then dominant Four Element medical system proved powerless to stop. A century later, Paracelsus introduced the use of active chemical drugs (like arsenic, copper sulfate, iron, mercury, and sulfur).

The 16th and 17th centuries were the great age of herbals, many of them available for the first time in English and other languages rather than Latin or Greek. The 18th and 19th centuries saw more incorporation of plants found in the Americas, but also the advance of modern medicine.

=== 16th and 17th centuries ===
It was common tradition that plants had physical representations of the maladies they were cures for. Individual plants, called "Simples", were used as a fix for maladies became the created generational wives' tales. These beliefs worked their way into the herbals to come. The first illustrated English herbal to be published was the anonymous Grete Herball of 1526. The two best-known herbals in English were The Herball or General History of Plants (1597) by John Gerard and The English Physician Enlarged (1653) by Nicholas Culpeper. Gerard's text was a heavily plagiarized variation of a book by the Belgian herbalist Rembert Dodoens, and his illustrations came from a German botanical work. The original edition contained many errors due to faulty matching of the two parts. The Family Physician and House Apothecary (1676) by Gideon Harvey, and other books of the kind, often faced public backlash. Culpeper's blend of traditional medicine with astrology, magic, and folklore was ridiculed by the physicians of his day. However, his book—like Gerard's and other herbals—enjoyed phenomenal popularity with continued printing of publications for years to come. The Age of Exploration and the Columbian Exchange introduced new medicinal plants to Europe. The Badianus Manuscript was an illustrated Mexican herbal written in Nahuatl and Latin in the 16th century. Upon the establishment of Colonial New England in the 17th century, more herbals on the native plants and indigenous practices of the region were produced and shared amongst Europeans, with one such example being New England's Rarities by John Josselyn.

=== 18th century ===
In the Americas, herbals were relied upon for most medical knowledge with physicians being few and far between. These books included almanacs, Dodoens' New Herbal, Edinburgh New Dispensatory, Buchan's Domestic Medicine, and other works. Aside from European knowledge on American plants, Native Americans shared some of their knowledge with colonists, but most of these records were not written and compiled until the 19th century. John Bartram was a botanist that studied the remedies that Native Americans would share and often included bits of knowledge of these plants in printed almanacs.

=== 19th century ===
==== Thomsonianism in the United States ====
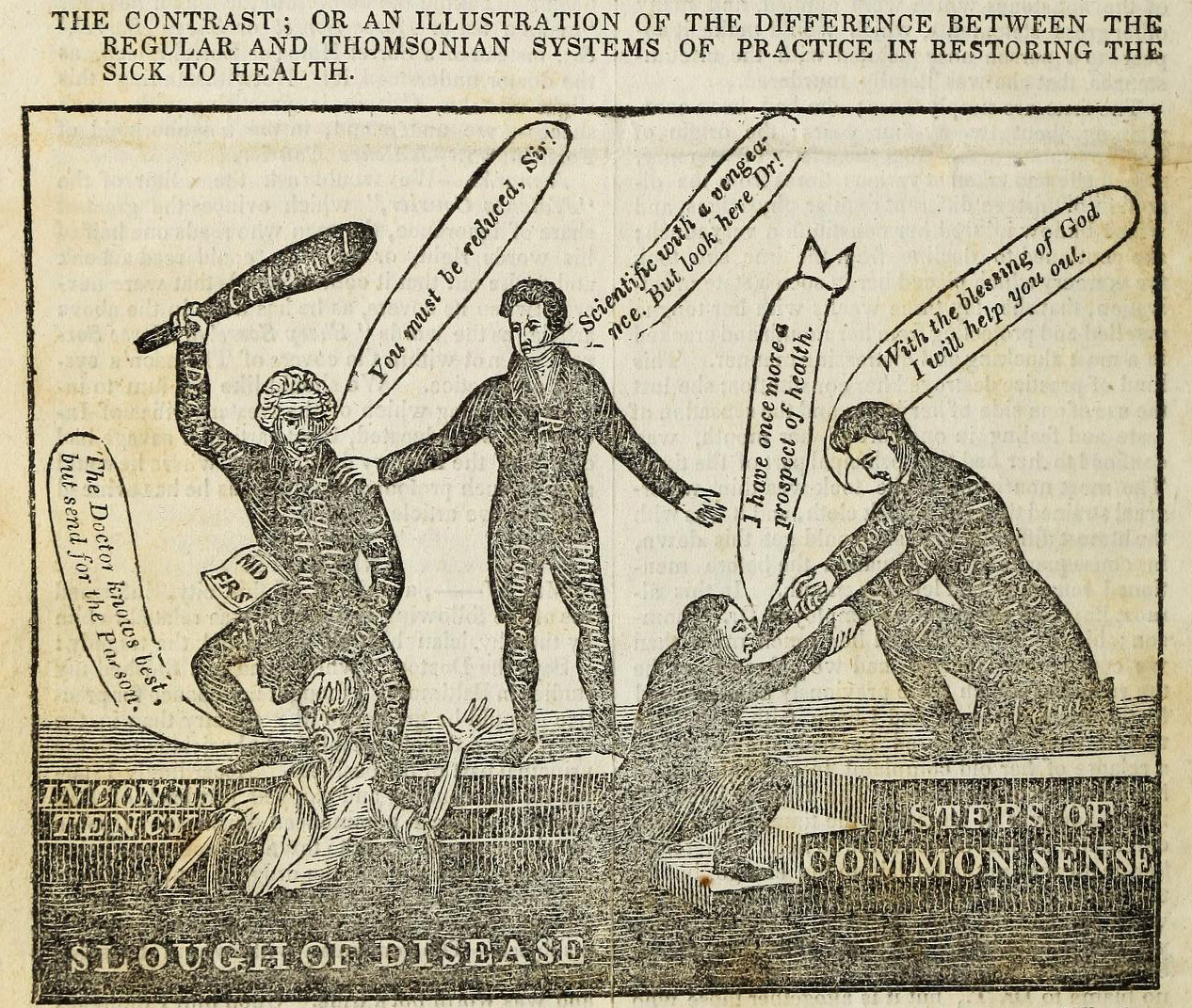
An 1834 cartoon depicting Thomson (on the right) saving a patient from brutal medical practices by the MD on the left.

In the early 19th century the United States was flooded with medical sects promoting a wide range of alternative treatments for all ailments. The medical societies tried to impose licensing requirements in state law, but the eclectics undid their efforts. At that time, Samuel Thomson was an uneducated but well respected herbalist who influenced professional opinions so much that doctors and herbalists would refer to themselves as Thomsonians. They distinguished themselves from "regular" doctors of the time who used calomel and bloodletting, and led to a brief renewal of the empirical method in herbal medicine.

Samuel Thomson (1769-1843) was a self educated New England farm boy who developed a very popular herbal medical system. He founded the Friendly Botanic Societies in 1813 and wrote a manual detailing his new methods. He promised that even the worst ailments could be cured without any harsh treatments. There would be no surgery, no deliberate bleeding, no powerful drugs. Disease was a matter of maladjustment in the body's internal heat, and could be cured by applying certain herbs and medicinal plants, coupled with vomiting, enemas, and steam baths. Thomson's approach resonated with workers and farmers who distrusted the bloody hands of traditional physicians. President Andrew Jackson endorsed the new fad, and Brigham Young promoted it to the new Mormon movement.

Thomson was a master promoter. He patented his system and sold licenses to hundreds of field agents who gained patients during the cholera outbreaks of 1832 and 1834. By 1839, the movement claimed three million followers and was strongest in New England.

However, in the 1840s it all fell apart. Thomson died in 1843, many patients grew worse after the treatment, while a bitter schism emerged among the Thomsonian agents. The result the sect's sharp decline by 1860. Nevertheless, Thomson's influence still can be seen among people suspicious of modern medicine. Many herbs he popularized, such as cayenne pepper, lobelia, and goldenseal, remain widely used to this day in herbal healing routines. The Thomsonians had been briefly successful in blocking state laws limited medical practice to licensed physicians. After the collapse the MDs made a comeback and reimposed strict licensing laws on the practice of medicine. The formalization of pharmacology in the late 19th century led to greater understanding of the specific actions drugs have on the body.

== Modern era ==
Traditional herbalism has been regarded as a method of alternative medicine in the United States since the Flexner Report of 1910 led to the closing of the eclectic medical schools where botanical medicine was exclusively practiced. In China, Mao Zedong reintroduced traditional Chinese medicine, which relied heavily on herbalism, into the health care system in 1949. Since then, schools have been training thousands of practitioners in the basics of Chinese medicines to be used in hospitals. While Britain in the 1930s was experiencing turbulence over the practice of herbalism, in the United States, government regulation began to prohibit the practice.

"The World Health Organization estimated that 80% of people worldwide rely on herbal medicines for some part of their primary health care. In Germany, about 600 to 700 plant based medicines are available and are prescribed by some 70% of German physicians."

The practice of prescribing treatments and cures to patients requires a legal medical license in the United States, and the licensing of these professions occurs on a state level. "There is currently no licensing or certification for herbalists in any state that precludes the rights of anyone to use, dispense, or recommend herbs."

"Traditional medicine is a complex network of interaction of both ideas and practices, the study of which requires a multidisciplinary approach." Many alternative physicians in the 21st century incorporate herbalism in traditional medicine due to the diverse abilities plants have and their low number of side effects.

== See also ==
- Ethnobotany
- History of pharmacy
- Medieval medicine of Western Europe
- Physic garden
- Traditional African medicine
- Traditional ecological knowledge
