= Hulunber Grassland Ecosystem Observation and Research Station =

Agricultural research station in Inner Mongolia, China

Coordinates: 49°19′N 119°55′E

Hulunber Grassland Ecosystem Observation and Research Station in Inner Mongolia, China, is managed by the Institute of Agricultural Resources and Regional Planning (IARRP) of the Chinese Academy of Agricultural Sciences (CAAS). It was established in 1997 and has an area of 400ha.

This station is a multi-year fenced scientific observation site for a Stipa baicalensis-dominated temperate meadow steppe. The annual precipitation is 350mm-400mm, with an average of 380mm. The annual average temperature ranges from -3°C to 1°C. The soil structure is dominated by dark chestnut soil, the soil pH is 8.3 on average, and the soil density is 1.13g/cm~3. The main species in the observation site are Stipa Baicalensis, Leymus chinensis, Filifolium sibiricum, Artemisia dracunculus, and Pulsatilla chinensis. There are 25 families and 96 genera in total. The grass coverage of this site is more than 70%, with an average height of the canopy of 50 cm and an average depth of the root of 30 cm.
