= Ziyuan National Geopark =

Park in Guangxi, China

Ziyuan National Geopark Chinese: 资源国家地质公园 is a park in Ziyuan County, Guangxi, China.

The park's entrance is at the Tianmenshan Scenic Spot which is situated at the middle part of the Geopark, the end of Zijiang driftage route, covering an area of about 5 km in diameter. Steep mountains, magic rocks, caves and streams characterize the park, where there are 38 major rock formations: 19 caves, 2 ponds, 6 springs 8 stone sculptures and so on. The Danxia topography is mainly characterized by dense deep gorges and valleys, and with many ridges and canyons. There are water eroding patterns with snake-like stone girders, as well as grand colluvial caves. The main peak, "Sanniang (the third girl) Stone" is a column that is said to hold up the sky. Here in the Ziyuan National Geopark is "The greatest Chinese medicine valley" which absorbs almost all the kinds of Chinese herbs used in Chinese medicine. The 16.3 m high sculpture of the Chinese medicine ancestor named "Shennong" honors this valley. There is 50 km^{2} of virgin forest on top of Shenxianzhai at 630m elevation, which can rarely be found in China. From east to west, where the sky is presenting the line you can see the Heavens Ridge, Peachblossom Island, Shenxianzhai, Sanniang Stone etc. The presentation of Danxia topography includes the fresco showing "the General Riding on a horse to Heavens Gate". The Wangyou Spring is known for to make you forget all the unhappy times in your life.
