= Ji Desheng =

Chinese herbalist (1898–1981)

Ji Desheng (Chinese: 季德胜; pinyin: Jì Déshèng; October 6, 1898 – October 18, 1981) was a Chinese herbalist from Nantong, Jiangsu, China specializing in snakebite medicine and treatment.

== Early years ==
Ji Desheng was born as an only child in Suqian, Jiangsu, China. His father, Ji Mingyang (季明扬), made a living selling traditional Chinese herbal remedies.

When Ji Desheng was 6 years old, his mother died. He travelled with his father to collect wild herbs, catch snakes, scorpions, centipedes, and other insects to prepare snakebite medicine. When Ji Desheng turned 18 years old, Suqian was hit by a drought and a plague epidemic. Ji Desheng and his father fled the area, relocating to Nanjing where they continued to make a living selling medicine.

== Nomadic life ==
During the winter of 1923, Ji Desheng relocated with his father to the town of Chahe, Rudong County, Jiangsu. His father died the following year. The 25-year-old Ji Desheng continued to produce the snakebite medicine with the recipe he had inherited.

In order to make improvements to the recipe, Ji Desheng tasted dozens of herbal ingredients commonly used for detoxification and pain reduction. Some of the ingredients have adverse effects when taken alone. When accidentally poisoned, Ji Desheng immediately took the antidotes taught to him by his father. He was able to determine the effectiveness and performance of each herb he tried. He also let snakes bite his shoulders, arms, and toes. When poisoned, he applied different medicines to the different types of wounds. Ji Desheng only applied medicine onto his patients after testing it himself. After nearly 10 years of testing, he had produced a standardized product. The end product was produced by a crushing a variety of ingredients into powder then adding liquid to form a cake-shaped tablet 2.5cm in diameter and 0.5cm in thickness. The medicine also came in the shapes of pills. Each piece of the medicinal cake and pills were printed with a red Chinese character of "Ji", the family name.

During the spring of 1942, Ji Desheng moved to Suzhou and successfully treated many patients. In 1948 Ji Desheng moved to Nantong to make a living as a street medicine vendor. There he continued to make improvements to the family medicine recipe.

Viper snakes are the most common type of snake in China. They also have the highest number of snakebite victims. Ji Desheng explained the viper's general behavior patterns to better cure their bites. He noted that vipers are most active during spring and autumn, especially before sudden weather changes like thunderstorms. Ji Desheng identified specific physical characteristics of dangerous snakes, such as a flat triangular head, thin neck, and bright skin color. These snakes leave distinct fang marks that quickly cause swelling and pose a life-threatening risk as the venom spreads rapidly. Ji Desheng was able to identify the type and gender of snakes that bit his patients from only the shape and depth of the bite marks. By utilizing his theories he was able to apply the right type and amount of medicine to cure his patients.

== Under the People's Republic of China ==
In 1955, Nantong City Health Bureau implemented the policy to centralize and improve traditional Chinese medicine. The Nantong Municipal Health Bureau visited Ji Desheng several times in order to learn more about his snakebite medicine. One time, the official observed a snakebite patient from Li Gang village of Tong Zhou County, a Nantong port town. After using the snakebite cake, topical powder, and acupuncture treatment, he quickly eliminated the swelling. The patient was able to return home that the same evening. In a separate demonstration for the Health Bureau officials, Ji Desheng took a viper from the cage and had the snake bite his left hand. His hand quickly turned red and began to swell. Ji Desheng soaked the snakebite cake in water and applied it to the wounded area. The medicine quickly impeded the spread of the venom.

In 1956, Nantong Municipal Health Bureau invited him to join the Nantong Ji Desheng Hospital as an out-patient specialist treating snakebites. The original Ji Desheng snakebite medicine was effective but would spoil over time. As well, the original dose was a black particle with a foul smell that could cause coloring of the teeth. For these reasons, the hospital set up a snakebite research group to improve the snakebite medicine. Together with the research group, Ji Desheng made adjustments to eliminate the flaws. Respecting Ji Desheng's contributions, the improved product was officially named Ji Desheng Snake Tablets. By 1958, Ji Desheng had successfully treated over 100 patients and attracted the attention of the pharmaceutical industry outside of Nantong. The Ministry of Science and Technology of China, with affirmation from the Ministry of Health (China), published the "Research of Ji Desheng Snake Medicine" as a scientific and technological achievement. In August, officials invited Ji Desheng to Beijing to meet the Party and State leaders including premier Zhou Enlai. The Chinese Academy of Sciences subsequently appointed him as a Research Fellow and the Ministry of Health awarded him the "Vanguard of Medical and Health Technology".

On August 28, 1960, the Ministry of Health requested Ji Desheng go to Wuhan to treat a PLA officer. At the age of 63 and hospitalized for pleurisy, Ji Desheng accepted the request and left for Wuhan. Ji Desheng immediately went to his patient upon his arrival. The patient had two bite marks on his left foot and was suffering from limb swelling, genital swelling, and was in a semi-conscious state. Desheng determined that the officer was bitten by a viper and had only a few more hours to live. He acted decisively to provide acupuncture to a Ba Feng pressure point, apply topical snake medicine to the ankle and knee, and had the patient ingest snakebite tablets. The patient woke up from his coma one hour later. After three days, the patient's condition improved. After eight days of treatment and care, Ji Desheng had saved the man's life.

== Later life and legacy ==
From 1956 to 1972, Ji Desheng, as the snakebite specialist at Nantong Hospital, treated over 600 patients with a complete cure rate of 99.57%. The Jiangsu Province Snakebite Research conducted in the 1990s found that since 1973, on the basis of prescription, Ji Desheng Snake Medicine successfully treated 99.32% of the 1700 received cased.

Ji Desheng continued to personally gather ingredients of his snakebite medicine in the country, woods and hills. He led the research efforts to find cures for cataracts and cancer. Before he could reach his dream of successfully applying his medicine to these diseases, he died unexpectedly on October 18, 1981, at the age of 83 due to a brain hemorrhage.

== See also ==
- Chinese herbology
- Chinese Medical Herbology and Pharmacology
