= Dưỡng sinh =

The exercise dưỡng sinh or Dưỡng Sinh (compare Chinese Yangsheng 養生) is a form of partly indigenous breathing and yoga exercise similar to Tai Chi popularized in Vietnam by the historian and political activist Nguyễn Khắc Viện.

Viện had been trained as a medical doctor in the field of women's and children's psychotherapy. When he himself was given three years to live he turned to practice of traditional breathing exercises. Although the name "dưỡng sinh" was popularised by Viện in Từ sinh lý đến dưỡng sinh and other books, the idea of "dưỡng sinh" is also known to village people as a supplement to thuốc Nam herbal medicine.
