= Tuệ Tĩnh =

Vietnamese physician (1330-c. 1389)

Tuệ Tĩnh (Chữ Hán: 慧靜, 1330–c. 1389), born Nguyễn Bá Tĩnh (阮伯靜), also known as Lê Đức Toản, was a Vietnamese Buddhist monk, physician, and writer. One of the earliest figures in the history of traditional Vietnamese medicine, Tuệ Tĩnh spent his later years in China, having been sent there by his government as a "living tributary present" to the Ming emperor.

== Early life and career ==
Nguyễn Bá Tĩnh was born in 1330 in Nghĩa Phú, a village in Hải Dương. After being orphaned at the age of six, he was raised in a Buddhist temple, where he was rechristened Tuệ Tĩnh, meaning "Tranquil Wisdom". According to one nineteenth-century source, he was also known as Lê Đức Toản. He studied both Buddhism and Taoism and also passed his imperial examinations at the age of 22. However, he declined a job offer from the Chinese bureaucracy and elected to pursue medicine instead. He specialised in herbal medicine and supported the establishment of medical gardens in pagodas across Vietnam.

== Later years and legacy ==
From 1385 onwards, Tuệ Tĩnh lived in Ming dynasty China, having been designated by the Trần court in Đại Việt as a "living tributary present" to the Chinese emperor. At the time, Tuệ Tĩnh was regarded as the most accomplished Buddhist monk and medical writer. He arrived at the capital city of Nanjing at the age of fifty-five and wrote a Chinese-language book on Vietnamese medicine, titled Nam dược thần hiệu (南藥神效) or Miraculous Drugs from the South. He also reportedly wrote Hồng Nghĩa giác tư y thư (洪義覺斯醫書), partly using Nôm verse.

Tuệ Tĩnh died around 1389 in Nanjing and was buried there, although part of the inscription on his tombstone beseeches visitors to take his remains back to Vietnam. A temple in Vietnam was built in honour of him during the mid-nineteenth century.

According to Leslie de Vries, Tuệ Tĩnh and Hải Thượng Lãn Ông are often referred to as the "founding fathers" of traditional Vietnamese medicine, after whom several hospitals, schools, and streets are named. Similarly, Claudia Michele Thompson notes that "Tuệ Tĩnh is considered to be the founding father of Vietnamese medicine."
