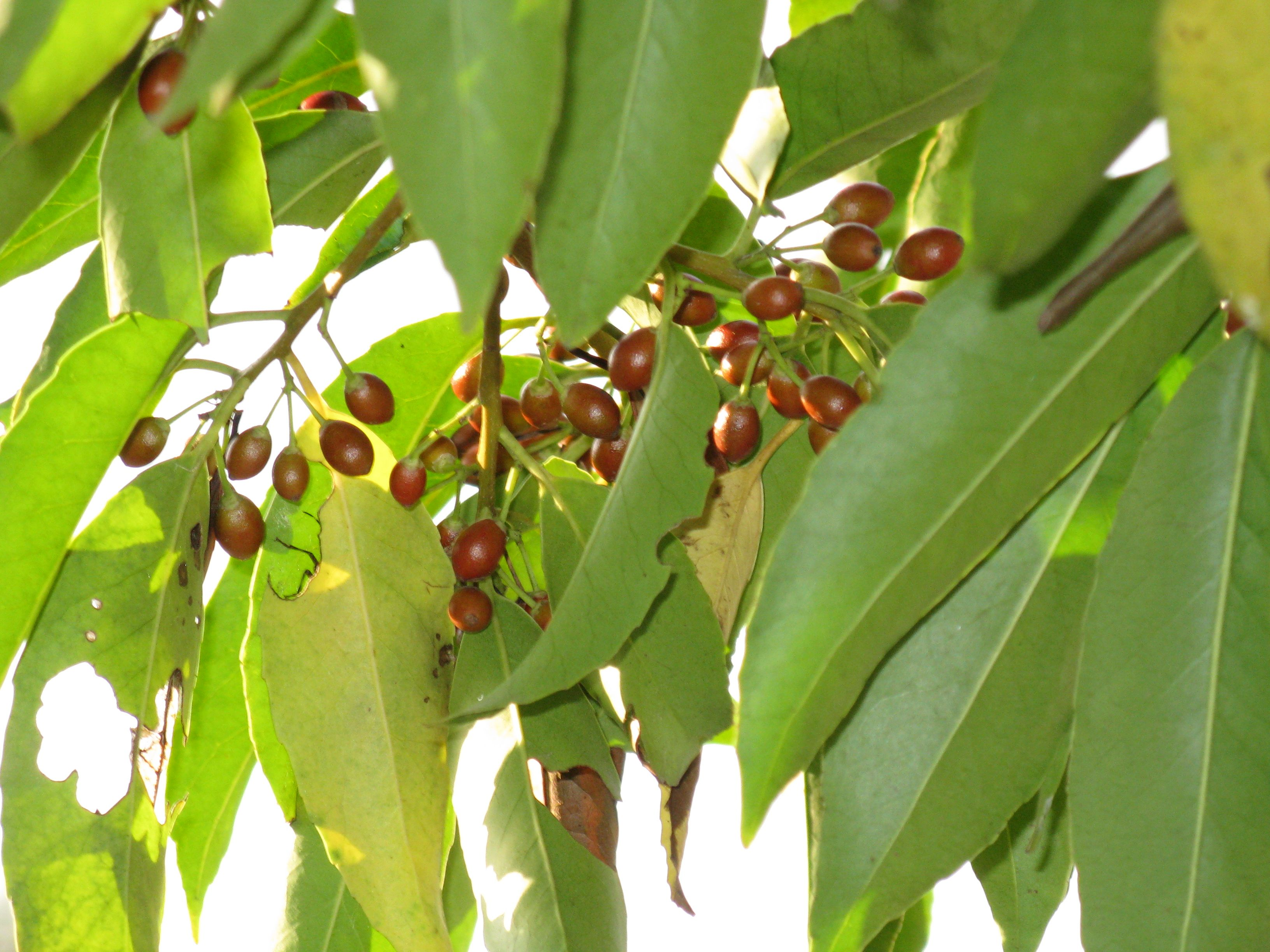
- Fruit and foliage
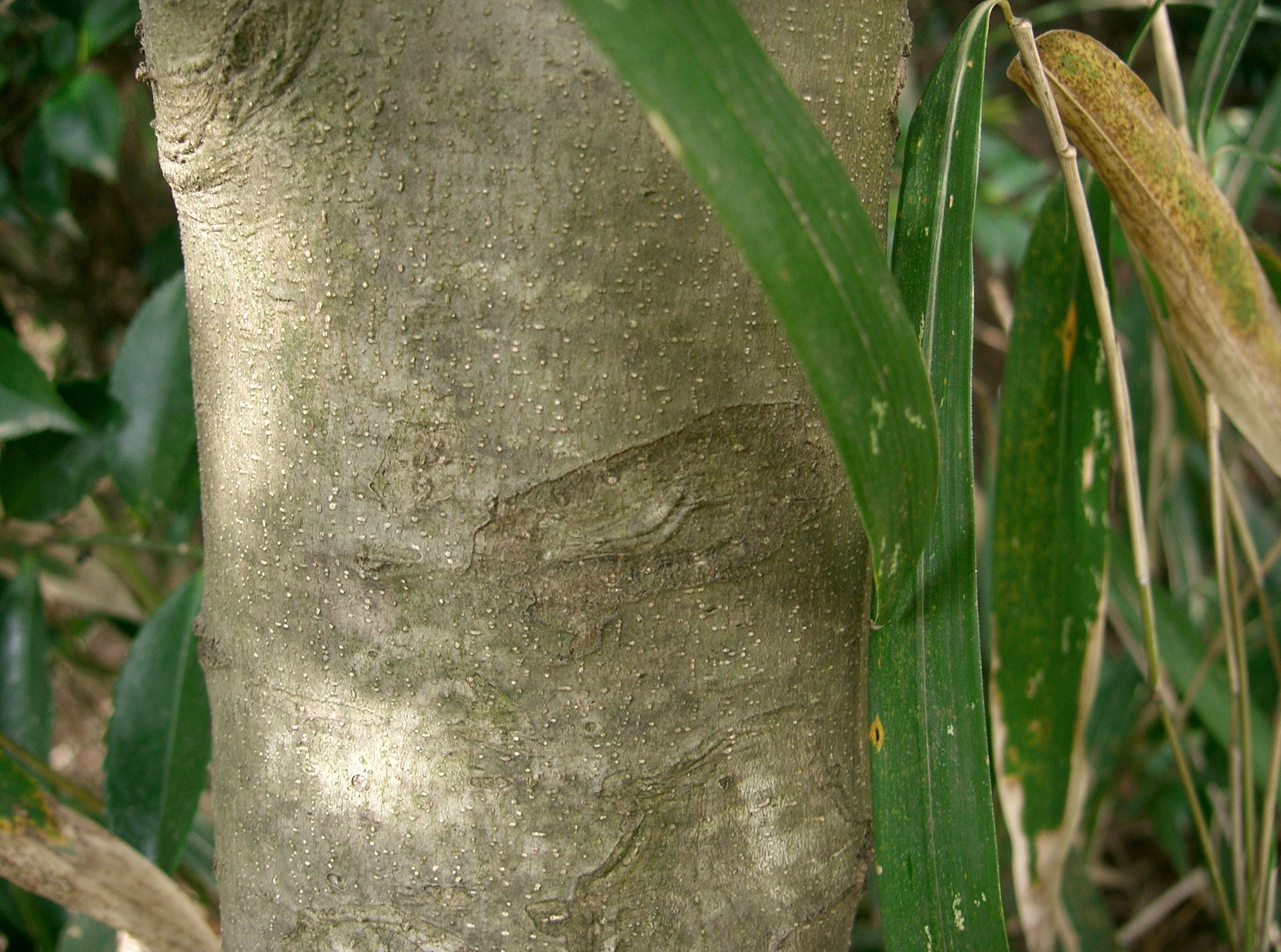
- Bole

Scientific classification
- Kingdom: Plantae
- Clade: Tracheophytes
- Clade: Angiosperms
- Clade: Eudicots
- Clade: Asterids
- Order: Aquifoliales
- Family: Aquifoliaceae
- Genus: Ilex
- Species: I. chinensis

Binomial name
- Ilex chinensis Sims

Synonyms
- List: Ilex chinensis f. angustifolia Sugim.; Ilex jinggangshanensis C.J.Tseng; Ilex myriadenia Hance; Ilex oldhamii Miq.; Ilex purpurea Hassk.; Ilex purpurea var. myriadenia (Hance) Loes.; Ilex purpurea var. nervosa Loes.; Ilex purpurea var. oldhamii (Miq.) Loes.; Celastrus bodinieri H.Lév.; Embelia rubroviolacea H.Lév.; Symplocos courtoisii H.Lév.

= Ilex chinensis =

Species of plant in the holly family

Ilex chinensis (syn. Ilex purpurea), the Kashi holly, oriental holly, or purple holly, is a species of flowering plant in the family Aquifoliaceae, native to Vietnam, southern China, Taiwan, and central and southern Japan.

== Uses ==
It is one of the 50 fundamental herbs used in traditional Chinese medicine, where it has the name dōng qīng (Chinese: 冬青). In traditional Chinese medicine, it is said to promote circulation, remove stasis, and clear heat and toxins. It is believed to improve conditions such as angina, high blood pressure, uveitis, coughs, chest congestion, and asthma. The root of Ilex purpurea can be applied topically to skin infections and burns, and to wounds. It has found use as a street tree in a number of Chinese and European cities.
