= Nguyễn Khắc Viện =

Vietnamese historian

Nguyễn Khắc Viện (5 February 1913 in Hương Sơn – 10 May 1997) was a Vietnamese historian, literary critic, sometime dissident, and advocate of a Vietnamese health exercise dưỡng sinh similar to yoga.

Viện was a member of the French Communist Party formerly in charge of external propaganda and statements to foreign press. However his circulating of criticism of the government in the 1980s led to a ban on his writings till the early 1990s.

== Life ==
Khắc Viện first came to Paris, France, in 1937, a time when the capital was a hotbed for anti-imperialist political exiles. He would stay in the country for twenty years, wherein he pursued an advanced degree in medicine, became a doctor and a writer.

He became a member of the French Communist Party in 1947, two years after Ho Chi Minh's declaration of Vietnamese independence. and worked on propaganda, campaigns, and discussions for Vietnamese national liberation with both French intellectuals and Vietnamese soldiers in the French army.

Khắc Viện was a prominent voice for Vietnamese national liberation since 1953 until his expulsion to Vietnam in 1963. He became the editor of the French journals Études Vietnamiennes (Vietnamese Studies) and the Courrier du Vietnam (Vietnamese Courier). Under the pseudonym Nguyen Nghe, he wrote a prominent critique of the book Wretched of the Earth by fellow anti-colonialist Franz Fanon, in the essay "Frantz Fanon and the Problems of Independence."

He married Nguyen Thi Nhat in 1966, and they had one adopted daughter.
