= Chinese herbology =

Traditional Chinese herbal therapy

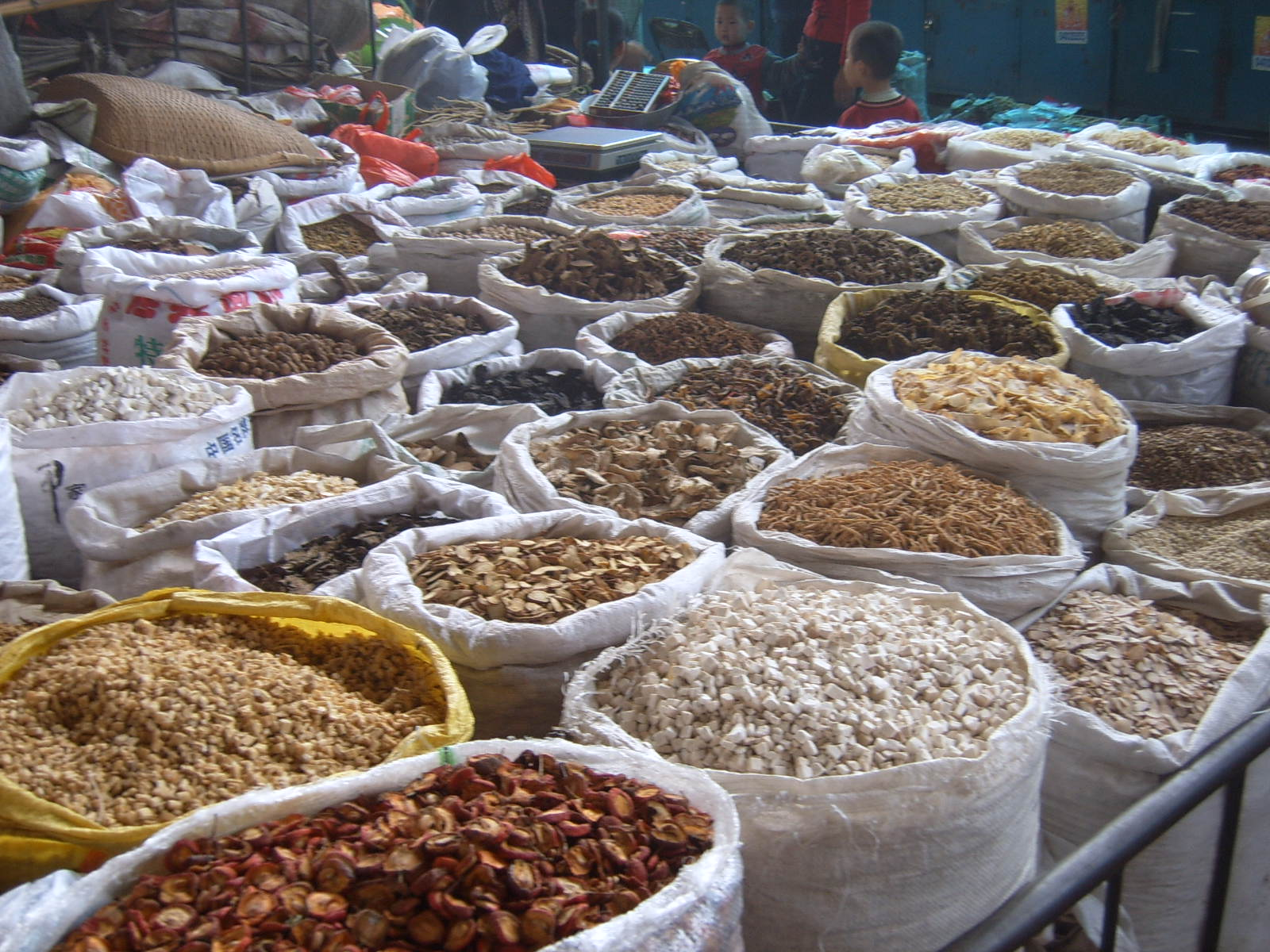
Dried herbs and plant portions for Chinese herbology at a Xi'an market

Chinese herbology or Chinese materia medica (traditional Chinese: 中藥學; simplified Chinese: 中药学; pinyin: zhōngyào xué; lit. 'Chinese medication study') is the theory of traditional Chinese pharmacotherapy, which accounts for the majority of treatments in traditional Chinese medicine (TCM). It is analogous to other traditional materia medica systems.

The term herbology is misleading in the sense that, while plant elements are by far the most commonly used substances, animal, human, and mineral products are also used, some of which are poisonous. In the Huangdi Neijing they are referred to as 毒藥 (pinyin: dúyào) which means "poison-medicine". Paul U. Unschuld points out that this is similar etymology to the Greek pharmakon and so he uses the term pharmaceutic. Thus, the term medicinal (instead of herb) is usually preferred as a translation for 藥 (pinyin: yào).

A Nature editorial described TCM as "fraught with pseudoscience", and said that the most obvious reason why it has not delivered many cures is that the majority of its treatments have no logical mechanism of action. Research into the effectiveness of traditional Chinese medicinal therapy is of poor quality and often tainted by bias, with little or no rigorous evidence of efficacy. There are concerns over a number of potentially toxic Chinese medicinals, including Aristolochia which is thought to cause cancer.

== History ==
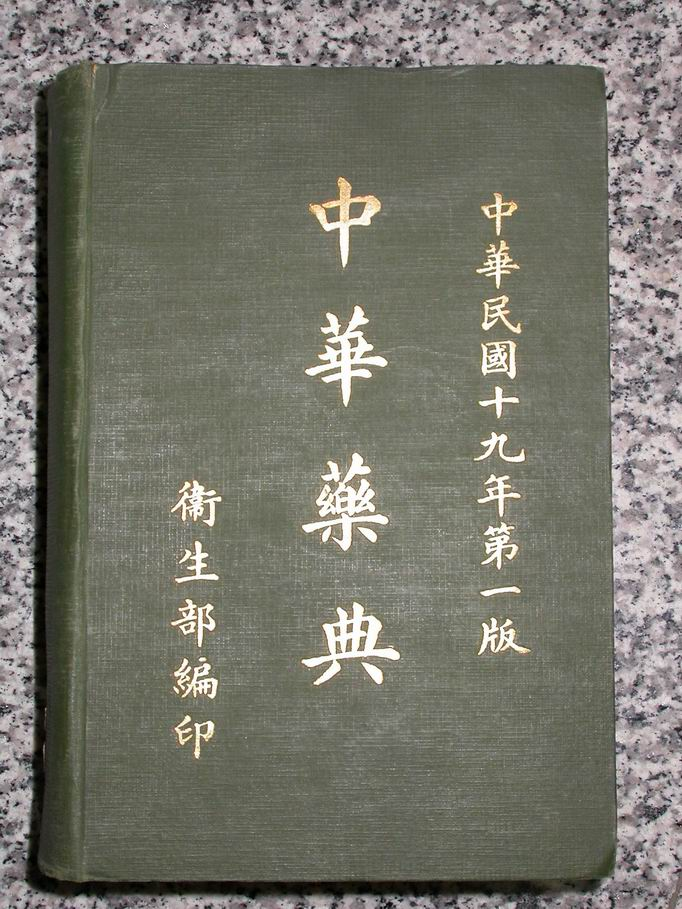
Chinese pharmacopoeia

The practice of Chinese materia medica stretches back for millennia. The earliest written record of prescriptions is the manuscript Recipes for 52 Ailments (五十二病方; Wǔshí'èr Bìngfāng), discovered in the Mawangdui tombs, which were sealed in 168 BCE.

Later tradition credits the legendary figure Shénnóng (神農, lit. "Divine Farmer") as the founder of Chinese materia medica. He is said to have lived around 2800 BCE and to have tasted hundreds of substances to ascertain their medicinal value. The first and most important herbal classic attributed to him is the Shénnóng Běn Cǎo Jīng (神農本草經; "Shennong's Materia Medica"). While the original text has been lost, it was transcribed and preserved in later commentaries. Modern scholarly research suggests that the text was compiled in the late Western Han period, likely around the first century BCE, and was not written by a single author. The Běn Cǎo Jīng classifies 365 substances, including plants, animals, and minerals into three categories:

1. "Superior" (上品; shàng pǐn): substances considered safe for long-term consumption to maintain health, with few to no side effects.
2. "Medium" (中品; zhōng pǐn): substances with some therapeutic action that may have mild toxicity depending on the dosage.
3. "Inferior" (下品; xià pǐn): substances taken for specific illnesses, often for shorter periods, as they are considered to have a higher potential for toxicity.

The next pivotal work was the Treatise on Cold Damage Disorders and Miscellaneous Illnesses (傷寒雜病論; Shānghán Zábìng Lùn), compiled by Zhang Zhongjing near the end of the Han dynasty (c. 196–220 CE). It is the first medical text that organized therapeutic principles around the diagnosis of symptom patterns (證; zheng), and it combined Yinyang and Five Phases theory with specific medicinal prescriptions. After passing through numerous changes, the original work now circulates as two separate books: the Treatise on Cold Damage Disorders and the Essential Prescriptions of the Golden Casket, which were edited separately in the eleventh century during the Song dynasty.

Succeeding generations augmented these works, as in the Yaoxing Lun (藥性論; 药性论; 'Treatise on the Nature of Medicinals'), a 7th-century Tang dynasty Chinese treatise on medicinal substances.

There was a shift in emphasis in treatment over several centuries. A section of the Huangdi Neijing Suwen including Chapter 74 was added by Wang Bing in his 765 edition, which says: 主病之謂君, 佐君之謂臣, 應臣之謂使, 非上下三品之謂也.; "The ruler of the disease is called the Sovereign, the aid to the Sovereign is called the Minister, the one that complies with the Minister is called the Envoy (Assistant), this is not a distinction between the three ranks of superior and inferior." The last part is interpreted as stating that these three rulers are not the three classes of Shénnóng mentioned previously. This chapter in particular outlines a more forceful approach. Later on Zhang Zihe (a.k.a. Zhang Cong-zhen, 1156–1228) is credited with founding the 'Attacking School' which criticized the overuse of tonics.

Arguably the most important of these later works is the Compendium of Materia Medica (本草綱目; Bencao Gangmu) compiled during the Ming dynasty by Li Shizhen, which is still used today for consultation and reference.

The use of Chinese herbs was popular during the medieval age in western Asian and Islamic countries. They were traded through the Silk Road from the East to the West. Cinnamon, ginger, rhubarb, nutmeg and cubeb are mentioned as Chinese herbs by medieval Islamic medical scholars Such as Rhazes (854–925 CE), Haly Abbas (930–994 CE) and Avicenna (980–1037 CE). There were also multiple similarities between the clinical uses of these herbs in Chinese and Islamic medicine.

== Raw materials ==
There are roughly 13,000 medicinals used in China and over 100,000 medicinal recipes recorded in the ancient literature. Plant elements and extracts are by far the most common elements used. In the classic Handbook of Traditional Drugs from 1941, 517 drugs were listed – out of these, only 45 were animal parts, and 30 were minerals. For many plants used as medicinals, detailed instructions have been handed down not only regarding the locations and areas where they grow best, but also regarding the best timing of planting and harvesting them.

Some animal parts used as medicinals can be considered rather strange such as cows' gallstones.

Furthermore, the classic materia medica Bencao Gangmu describes the use of 35 traditional Chinese medicines derived from the human body, including bones, fingernail, hairs, dandruff, earwax, impurities on the teeth, feces, urine, sweat, and organs, but most are no longer in use.

== Preparation ==
=== Decoction ===
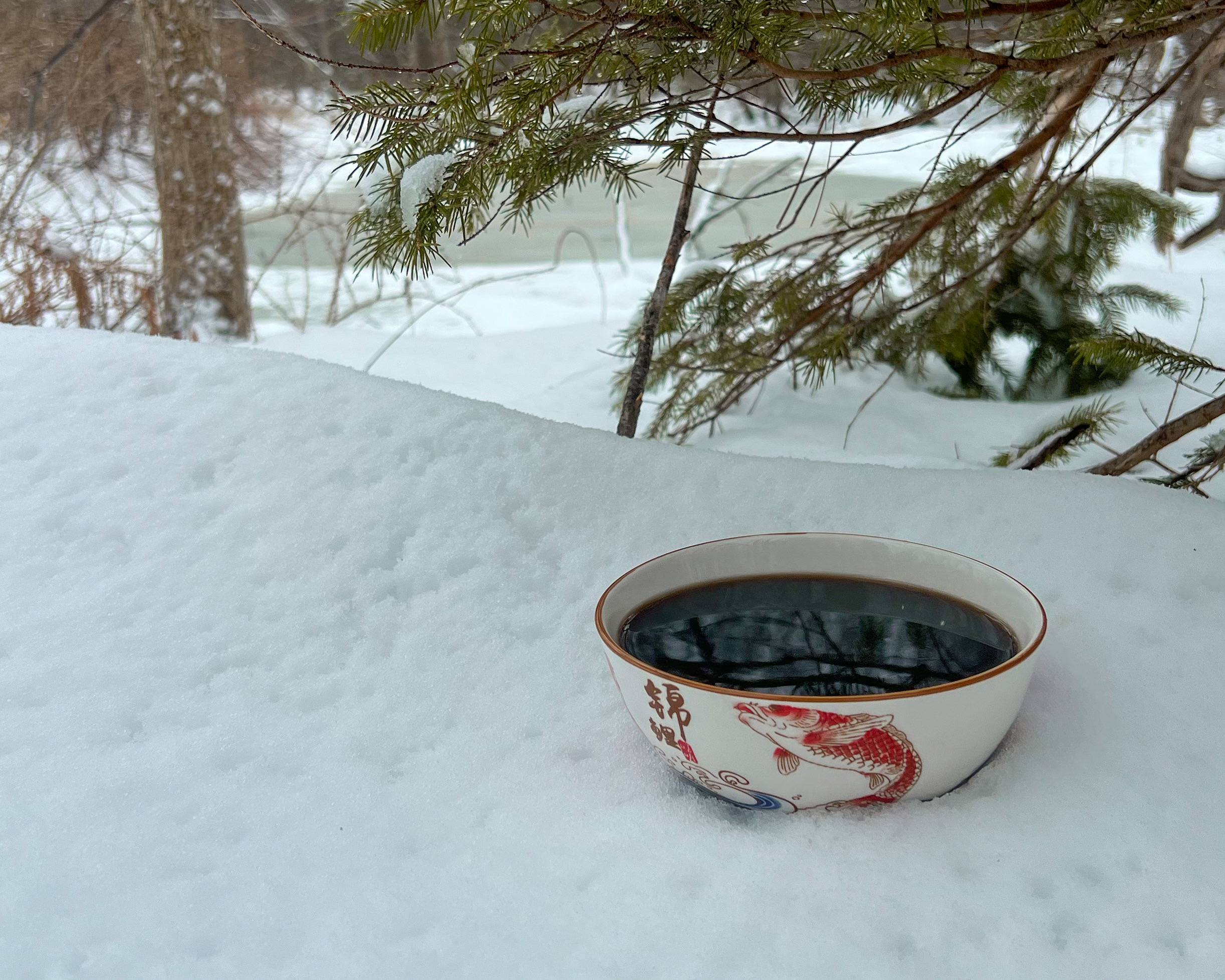
A traditional Chinese herbal decoction (湯劑/汤剂)

Typically, one batch of medicinals is prepared as a decoction of about 9 to 18 substances. Some of these are considered as main materials, some as ancillary; within the ancillary , up to three categories can be distinguished. Some ingredients are added to cancel out toxicity or side-effects of the main ingredients; on top of that, some medicinals require the use of other substances as catalysts.

=== Chinese patent medicine ===
Chinese patent medicine (中成藥; 中成药; zhōngchéng yào) is a kind of traditional Chinese medicine. They are standardized herbal formulas. From ancient times, pills were formed by combining several medicinals and other ingredients (excipients), which were dried and ground into a powder. They were then mixed with a binder and formed into pills by hand. The binder was traditionally honey. Modern teapills, however, are extracted in stainless steel extractors to create either a water decoction or water-alcohol decoction, depending on the medicinal substance used. They are extracted at a low temperature (below 100 °C (212 °F)) to preserve essential ingredients. The extracted liquid is then further condensed, and some raw medicinal powder from one of the medicinal ingredients is mixed in to form a medicinal dough. This dough is then machine cut into tiny pieces, a small amount of excipients are added for a smooth and consistent exterior, and they are spun into pills.

These medicines are not patented in the traditional sense of the word. No one has exclusive rights to the formula. Instead, "patent" refers to the standardization of the formula. In China, all Chinese patent medicines of the same name will have the same proportions of ingredients, and manufactured in accordance with the PRC Pharmacopoeia, which is mandated by law. However, in western countries there may be variations in the proportions of ingredients in patent medicines of the same name, and even different ingredients altogether.

Several producers of Chinese herbal medicines are pursuing FDA clinical trials to market their products as drugs in U.S. and European markets.

=== Chinese herbal extracts ===
Chinese herbal extracts are herbal decoctions that have been condensed into a granular or powdered form. Herbal extracts, similar to patent medicines, are easier and more convenient for patients to take. The industry extraction standard is 5:1, meaning for every five pounds of raw materials, one pound of herbal extract is derived.

== Categorization ==
There are several different methods to classify traditional Chinese medicinals:

- The Four Natures (四氣; 四气; sìqì)
- The Five Flavors (五味; wǔwèi)
- The meridians (經絡; 经络; jīngluò)
- The specific function.

=== Four Natures ===
The Four Natures are: hot (熱; 热), warm (溫; 温), cool (涼), cold (寒) or neutral (平). Hot and warm medicinals are used to treat cold diseases, while cool and cold medicinals are used to treat hot diseases.

=== Five Flavors ===
The Five Phases, which correspond to the Five Flavors

The Five Flavors, sometimes also translated as Five Tastes, are: acrid/pungent (辛), sweet (甘), bitter (苦), sour (酸), and salty (鹹; 咸). Substances may also have more than one flavor, or none (i.e., a bland (淡) flavor). Each of the Five Flavors corresponds to one of the zàng organs, which in turn corresponds to one of the Five Phases: A flavor implies certain properties and presumed therapeutic "actions" of a substance: saltiness "drains downward and softens hard masses"; sweetness is "supplementing, harmonizing, and moistening"; pungent substances are thought to induce sweat and act on qi and blood; sourness tends to be astringent (澀; 涩) in nature; bitterness "drains heat, purges the bowels, and eliminates dampness".

=== Specific function ===
These categories mainly include:

- exterior-releasing or exterior-resolving
- heat-clearing
- downward-draining or precipitating
- wind-damp-dispelling
- dampness-transforming
- promoting the movement of water and percolating dampness or dampness-percolating
- interior-warming
- qi-regulating or qi-rectifying
- dispersing food accumulation or food-dispersing
- worm-expelling
- stopping bleeding or blood-stanching
- quickening the Blood and dispelling stasis or blood-quickening or blood-moving.
- transforming phlegm, stopping coughing and calming wheezing or phlegm-transforming and cough- and panting-suppressing
- Spirit-quieting or Shen-calming.
- calming the Liver and expelling wind or liver-calming and wind-extinguishing
- orifice-opening
- supplementing or tonifying: this includes qi-supplementing, blood-nourishing, yin-enriching, and yang-fortifying
- astriction-promoting or securing and astringing
- vomiting-inducing
- substances for external application

== Nomenclature ==
Many herbs earn their names from their unique physical appearance. Examples of such names include Niu Xi (Radix cyathulae seu achyranthis), 'cow's knees,' which has big joints that might look like cow knees; Bai Mu Er (Fructificatio tremellae fuciformis), 'white wood ear', which is white and resembles an ear; Gou Ji (Rhizoma cibotii), 'dog spine,' which resembles the spine of a dog.

=== Color ===
Color is not only a valuable means of identifying herbs, but in many cases also provides information about the therapeutic attributes of the material. For example, yellow herbs are referred to as huang (yellow) or jin (gold). Huang Bai (Cortex Phellodendri) means 'yellow fir", and Jin Yin Hua (Flos Lonicerae) has the label 'golden silver flower."

=== Smell and taste ===
Unique flavors define specific names for some substances. Gan means 'sweet,' so Gan Cao (Radix glycyrrhizae) is 'sweet herb,' an adequate description for the licorice root. Ku means 'bitter', thus Ku Shen (Sophorae flavescentis) translates as 'bitter herb.'

=== Geographic location ===
The locations or provinces in which herbs are grown often figure into herb names. For example, Bei Sha Shen (Radix glehniae) is grown and harvested in northern China, whereas Nan Sha Shen (Radix adenophorae) originated in southern China. And the Chinese words for north and south are respectively bei and nan.

Chuan Bei Mu (Bulbus fritillariae cirrhosae) and Chuan Niu Xi (Radix cyathulae) are both found in Sichuan province, as the character chuan indicates in their names.

=== Function ===
Some herbs, like Fang Feng (Radix Saposhnikoviae), literally 'prevent wind,' preventing or treating wind-related illnesses. Xu Duan (Radix Dipsaci), literally 'restore the broken,' treating torn soft tissues and broken bones.

=== Country of origin ===
Many herbs indigenous to other countries have been incorporated into the Chinese materia medica. Xi Yang Shen (Radix panacis quinquefolii), imported from North American crops, translates as 'western ginseng,' while Dong Yang Shen (Radix ginseng Japonica), grown in and imported from North Asian countries, is 'eastern ginseng.'

== Toxicity ==
From the earliest records regarding the use of medicinals to today, the toxicity of certain substances has been described in all Chinese materia medica. Since TCM has become more popular in the Western world, there are increasing concerns about the potential toxicity of many traditional Chinese medicinals including plants, animal parts and minerals. For most medicinals, efficacy and toxicity testing are based on traditional knowledge rather than laboratory analysis. The toxicity in some cases could be confirmed by modern research (i.e., in scorpion); in some cases it could not (i.e., in Curculigo). Further, ingredients may have different names in different locales or in historical texts, and different preparations may have similar names for the same reason, which can create inconsistencies and confusion in the creation of medicinals, with the possible danger of poisoning. Edzard Ernst "concluded that adverse effects of herbal medicines are an important albeit neglected subject in dermatology, which deserves further systematic investigation." Research suggests that the toxic heavy metals and undeclared drugs found in Chinese medicines might be a serious health issue.

Substances known to be potentially dangerous include aconite, secretions from the Asiatic toad, powdered centipede, the Chinese beetle (Mylabris phalerata, Ban mao), and certain fungi. There are health problems associated with Aristolochia. Toxic effects are also frequent with Aconitum. To avoid its toxic adverse effects Xanthium sibiricum must be processed. Hepatotoxicity has been reported with products containing Reynoutria multiflora (synonym Polygonum multiflorum), glycyrrhizin, Senecio and Symphytum. The evidence suggests that hepatotoxic herbs also include Dictamnus dasycarpus, Astragalus membranaceus, and Paeonia lactiflora; although there is no evidence that they cause liver damage. Contrary to popular belief, Ganoderma lucidum mushroom extract, as an adjuvant for cancer immunotherapy, appears to have the potential for toxicity.

Also, adulteration of some Chinese medicine preparations with conventional drugs which may cause serious adverse effects, such as corticosteroids, phenylbutazone, phenytoin, and glibenclamide, has been reported.

However, many adverse reactions are due to misuse or abuse of Chinese medicine. For example, the misuse of the dietary supplement Ephedra (containing ephedrine) can lead to adverse events including gastrointestinal problems as well as sudden death from cardiomyopathy. Products adulterated with pharmaceuticals for weight loss or erectile dysfunction are one of the main concerns. TCM preparations has been a major cause of acute liver failure in China.

Most Chinese medicinals are safe but some have shown not to be. Reports have shown products being contaminated with drugs, toxins, or false reporting of ingredients. Some medicinals used in TCM may also react with drugs, have side effects, or be dangerous to people with certain medical conditions.

== Efficacy ==
Only a few trials exist that are considered to have adequate methodology by scientific standards. Proof of effectiveness is poorly documented or absent. A 2016 Cochrane review found "insufficient evidence that Chinese Herbal Medicines were any more or less effective than placebo or hormonal therapy" for the relief of menopause related symptoms. A 2012 Cochrane review found no difference in decreased mortality for SARS patients when Chinese herbs were used alongside Western medicine versus Western medicine exclusively. A 2010 Cochrane review found there is not enough robust evidence to support the effectiveness of traditional Chinese medicine herbs to stop the bleeding from haemorrhoids. A 2008 Cochrane review found promising evidence for the use of Chinese herbal medicine in relieving painful menstruation, compared to conventional medicine such as NSAIDs and the oral contraceptive pill, but the findings are of low methodological quality. A 2012 Cochrane review found weak evidence suggesting that some Chinese medicinal herbs have a similar effect at preventing and treating influenza as antiviral medication. Due to the poor quality of these medical studies, there is insufficient evidence to support or dismiss the use of Chinese medicinal herbs for the treatment of influenza. There is a need for larger and higher quality randomized clinical trials to determine how effective Chinese herbal medicine is for treating people with influenza. A 2005 Cochrane review found that although the evidence was weak for the use of any single herb, there was low-quality evidence that some Chinese medicinal herbs may be effective for the treatment of acute pancreatitis.

== Ecological impacts ==
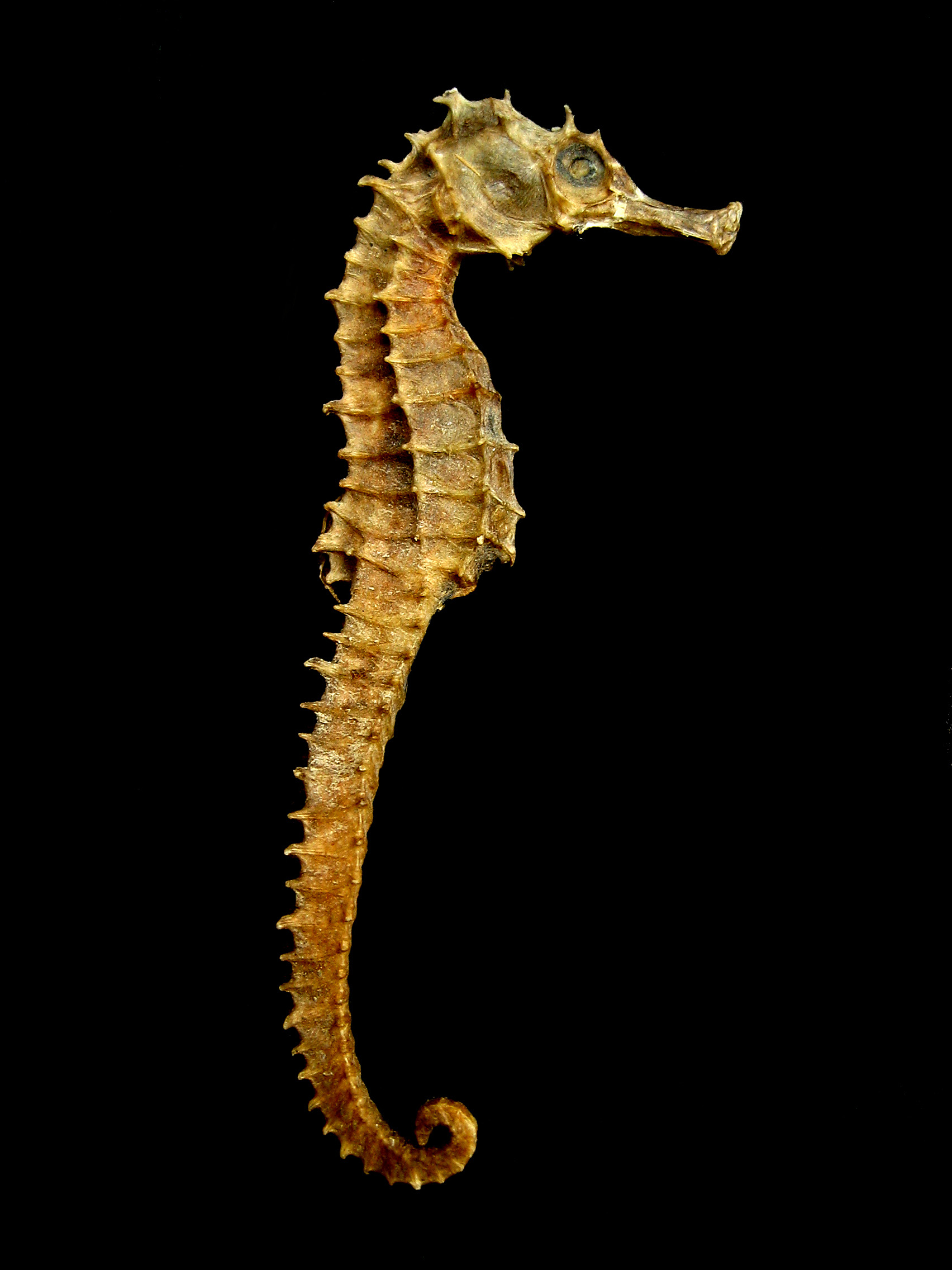
Dried seahorses like these are extensively used in traditional medicine in China and elsewhere.

The traditional practice of using now-endangered species is controversial within TCM. Modern Materia Medicas such as Bensky, Clavey and Stoger's comprehensive Chinese herbal text discuss substances derived from endangered species in an appendix, emphasizing alternatives.

Parts of endangered species used as TCM drugs include tiger bones and rhinoceros horn. Poachers supply the black market with such substances, and the black market in rhinoceros horn, for example, has reduced the world's rhino population by more than 90 percent over the past 40 years. Concerns have also arisen over the use of turtle plastron and seahorses.

TCM recognizes bear bile as a medicinal. In 1988, the Chinese Ministry of Health started controlling bile production, which previously used bears killed before winter. Now bears are fitted with a sort of permanent catheter, which is more profitable than killing the bears. More than 12,000 asiatic black bears are held in "bear farms", where they suffer cruel conditions while being held in tiny cages. The catheter leads through a permanent hole in the abdomen directly to the gall bladder, which can cause severe pain. Increased international attention has mostly stopped the use of bile outside of China; gallbladders from butchered cattle (牛胆; 牛膽; niú dǎn) are recommended as a substitute for this ingredient.

Collecting American ginseng to assist the Asian traditional medicine trade has made ginseng the most harvested wild plant in North America for the last two centuries, which eventually led to a listing on CITES Appendix II.

Chinese medicinal plant materials (CMPMs) release chemicals that attracts the Drugstore beetle, leading to the accumulation of this pest and further infestation and damage to these plants.

== Herbs in use ==
Chinese herbology is a pseudoscientific practice with safety hazards and misleading health advice. Product quality is also potentially unreliable, though regulatory bodies and standards such as China GMP (Good Manufacturing Process) have been set up to maintain quality in their respective jurisdictions.

There are over 300 herbs in common use. Some of the most commonly used herbs are Ginseng (人参; 人參; rénshēn), wolfberry (枸杞子; gǒuqǐzǐ), dong quai (Angelica sinensis, 当归; 當歸; dāngguī), astragalus (黄耆; 黃耆; huángqí), atractylodes (白术; 白朮; báizhú), bupleurum (柴胡; cháihú), cinnamon (cinnamon twigs (桂枝; guìzhī) and cinnamon bark (肉桂; ròuguì)), coptis (黄连; 黃連; huánglián), ginger (姜; 薑; jiāng), hoelen (茯苓; fúlíng), licorice (甘草; gāncǎo), ephedra sinica (麻黄; 麻黃; máhuáng), peony (white: 白芍; báisháo and reddish: 赤芍; chìsháo), rehmannia (地黄; 地黃; dìhuáng), rhubarb (大黄; 大黃; dàhuáng), and salvia (丹参; 丹參; dānshēn).

To reitertate, there is a lack of high-quality scientific research on herbology practices and product effectiveness for anti-disease activity. In the herbal sources listed below, there is little or no evidence for efficacy or proof of safety across consumer age groups and disease conditions for which they are intended.

=== 50 fundamental herbs ===
In Chinese herbology, there are 50 "fundamental" herbs, as given in the reference text, although these herbs are not universally recognized as such in other texts. The herbs are:

Binomial nomenclature	Chinese name	English common name (when available)
Agastache rugosa (藿香) or Pogostemon cablin (广藿香; 廣藿香)	huò xiāng (藿香), guǎng huòxiāng (广藿香; 廣藿香)	Korean mint, Patchouli
Alangium chinense	bā jiǎo fēng (八角枫; 八角楓)	Chinese Alangium root
Anisodus tanguticus	shān làng dàng (山莨菪)	(translated) Mountain henbane
Ardisia japonica	zǐ jīn niú (紫金牛)	Marlberry
Aster tataricus (a.k.a. Galatella tatarica)	zǐ wǎn (紫菀)	Tatar aster, Tartar aster
Astragalus mongholicus (a.k.a. A. membranaceus, A. propinquus)	huáng qí (黄芪; 黃芪) or běi qí (北芪)	Mongolian milkvetch
Camellia sinensis (a.k.a. Thea sinensis)	chá shù (茶树; 茶樹) or chá yè (茶叶; 茶葉)	Tea plant
Cannabis sativa	dà má (大麻)	Cannabis
Carthamus tinctorius	hóng huā (红花; 紅花)	Safflower
Cinnamomum aromaticum (a.k.a. Cinnamomum cassia var. medium)	ròu gùi (肉桂)	Cassia (bark), Chinese cinnamon
Cissampelos pareira	(Tw.): xí shēng téng (錫生藤), xī shēng téng (锡生藤) or yà hū nú (亚乎奴; 亞乎奴)	Velvet leaf
Conioselinum anthriscoides 'Chuanxiong', a.k.a. Ligusticum chuanxiong	chuān xiōng, (Tw.): chuān qiōng (川芎)	Sichuan lovage, Szechuan lovage (Szechwuan lovage), belongs to the genus hemlock-parsley
Coptis chinensis	duǎn è huáng lián (短萼黄连; 短蕚黃蓮)	Chinese goldthread
Corydalis yanhusuo	yán hú suǒ (延胡索)	Chinese poppy, Yan Hu Suo, close relative to Corydalis ambigua and fumewort
Croton tiglium	bā dòu (巴豆)	Purging croton
Daphne genkwa	yuán huā (芫花)	Lilac daphne
Datura metel	yáng jīn huā (洋金花)	Devil's trumpet
Datura stramonium	zǐ huā màn tuó luó (紫花曼陀萝; 紫花曼陀蘿)	Jimson weed
Dendrobium nobile	shí hú (石斛) or shí hú lán (石斛兰; 石斛蘭)	Noble dendrobium
Dolomiaea costus (a.k.a. Saussurea costus)	yún mù xiāng (云木香; 雲木香)	Costus root
Ephedra sinica	cǎo máhuáng (草麻黄; 草麻黃)	Chinese ephedra
Eucommia ulmoides	dù zhòng (杜仲)	Hardy rubber tree
Euphorbia pekinensis	dà jǐ (大戟)	Peking spurge
Flueggea suffruticosa (a.k.a. Securinega suffruticosa)	yī yè qiū (一叶秋; 一葉秋)	a type of shrub-like bushweed of the family Phyllanthaceae
Forsythia suspensa	liánqiáo (连翘; 蓮翘)	Weeping forsythia
Gentiana loureiroi	dì dīng (地丁)	Loureiro's gentian
Gleditsia sinensis	zào jiá (皂荚)	Chinese honeylocust
Glycyrrhiza uralensis	gān cǎo (甘草)	Licorice
Hydnocarpus castaneus (a.k.a. Hydnocarpus anthelminthicus)	dà fēng zǐ (大风子; 大風子)	Chaulmoogra tree
Hydrangea febrifuga (a.k.a. Dichroa febrifuga)	cháng shān (常山)	Blue evergreen hydrangea, Chinese quinine
Ilex chinensis (a.k.a. Ilex purpurea)	dōngqīng (冬青)	Purple holly
Leonurus japonicus	yì mǔ cǎo (益母草)	Chinese motherwort
Lobelia chinensis	bàn biān lián (半边莲; 半邊蓮)	Creeping lobelia
Phellodendron amurense	huáng bǎi (黄柏; 黃柏)	Amur cork tree
Platycladus orientalis (formerly Thuja orientalis)	cè bǎi (侧柏; 側柏)	Chinese arborvitae
Pseudolarix amabilis	jīn qián sōng (金钱松; 金錢松)	Golden larch
Psilopeganum sinense	shān má huáng (山麻黄; 山麻黃)	Naked rue
Pueraria montana var. lobata	gé gēn (葛根)	Kudzu
Pulsatilla chinensis (a.k.a. Anemone pulsatilla var. chinensis)	bái tóu wēng (白头翁; 白頭翁)	Chinese anemone
Rauvolfia serpentina	shégēnmù (蛇根木), cóng shégēnmù (從蛇根木) or yìndù shé mù (印度蛇木)	Sarpagandha, Indian snakeroot
Rehmannia glutinosa	dìhuáng (地黄; 地黃)	Chinese foxglove
Rheum officinale	yào yòng dà huáng (药用大黄; 藥用大黃)	Chinese or Eastern rhubarb
Rhododendron qinghaiense	Qīnghǎi dù juān (青海杜鹃; 青海杜絹鵑)	Qinghai rhododendron (Qinghai alprose)
Schisandra chinensis	wǔ wèi zi (五味子)	Chinese magnolia vine
Scutellaria baicalensis	huáng qín (黄芩; 黃芩)	Baikal skullcap
Stemona tuberosa	bǎi bù (百部)	tuberous stemonia of the family Stemonaceae
Stephania tetrandra	fáng jǐ (防己)	Stephania root
Styphnolobium japonicum (formerly Sophora japonica)	huái (槐), huái shù (槐树; 槐樹), or huái huā (槐花)	Pagoda tree
Trichosanthes kirilowii	guā lóu (栝楼)	Chinese cucumber
Wikstroemia indica	liāo gē wáng (了哥王)	Indian stringbush

=== Other Chinese herbs ===
In addition to the above, many other Chinese herbs and other substances are in common use, and these include:

- Akebia quinata (木通)
- Arisaema heterophyllum (胆南星)
- Chenpi (sun-dried tangerine (mandarin) peel) (陳皮)
- Clematis chinensis (威灵仙)
- Concretio silicea bambusae (天竺黄)
- Cordyceps sinensis (冬虫夏草)
- Curcuma longa, Curcuma aromatica (郁金)
- Dalbergia odorifera (降香)
- Myrrh (没药)
- Frankincense (乳香)
- Prunus persica (桃仁)
- Patchouli (广藿香)
- Polygonum (虎杖)
- Sparganium stoloniferum (三棱)
- Zedoary (Curcuma zedoaria) (莪朮)

== Herbal Formulas ==
=== Types of Formulas ===
Traditional Chinese herbs are used either standalone, or in a grouping, jointly with other herbs. When several herbs are used together, this amalgamation is called a 'herbal formula'.

There are, generally speaking, three types of herbal formulas used in TCM:

1. Classic Formulas – these are formulas which TCM practitioners believe have withstood the test of time over the centuries, and are mentioned in classical texts, such as the Shanghan Lun.
2. Patent Formulas – these are either classic formulas, or newer commonly used formulas created in recent decades. The patent formulas stand out in that their usage is common enough, that they are frequently mass-produced by large companies, in China, the United States, and elsewhere.
3. Custom-Made Formulas – these formulas are composed by a TCM Practitioner, to match the specific diagnosis and medical condition of a patient. These formulas are often partially based on the older, classic formulas.

=== Formula Hierarchy ===
The prescription of TCM formulas, is based on 4-tier system of hierarchy. The 4-tiers are: Jun (君), Chen (臣), Zuo (佐) and Shi (使). These four tiers are often translated as: Sovereign, Minister, Assistant, Courier; or Monarch, Minister, Assistant, Envoy (also: 'Guide').

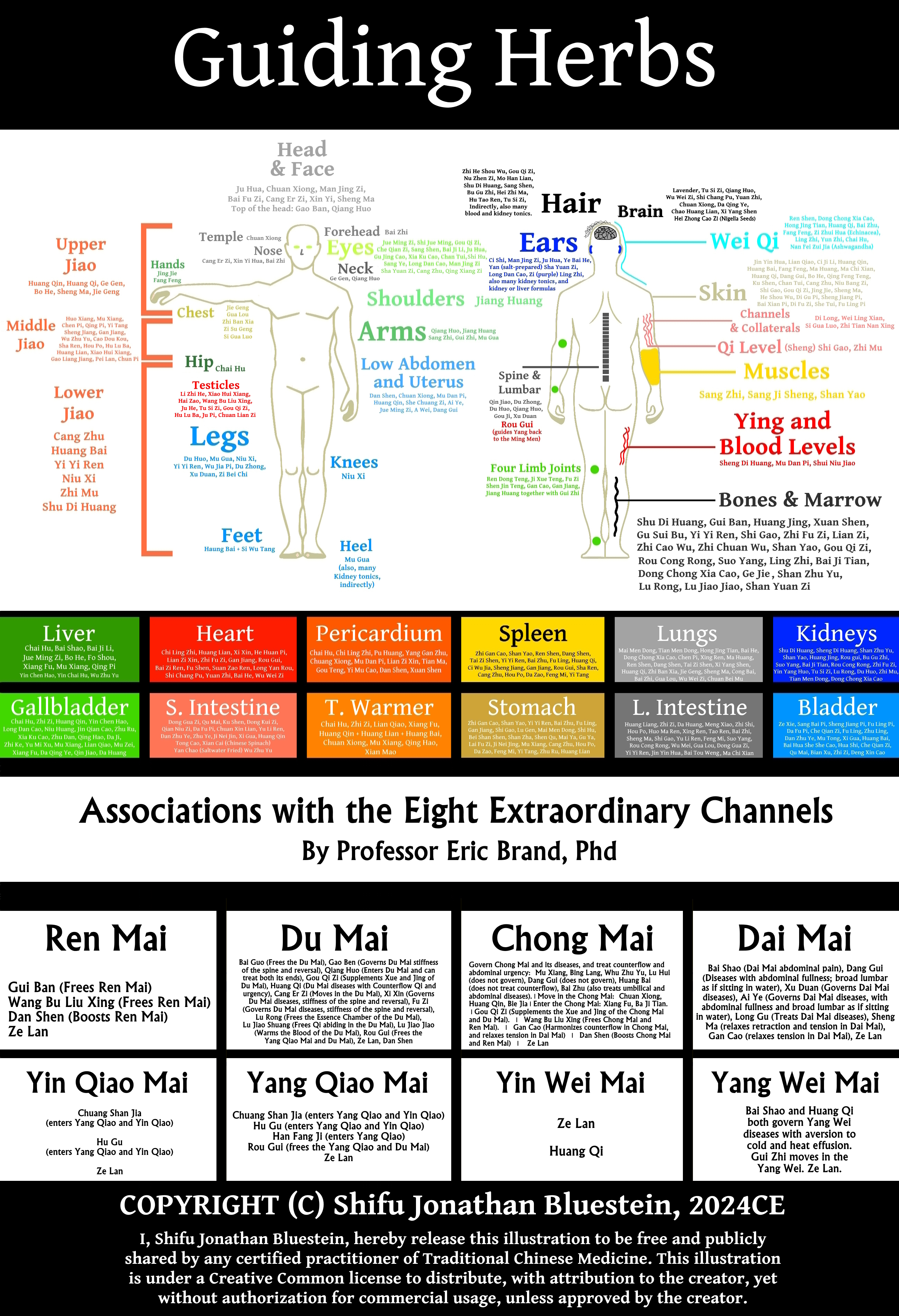
An illustrative summary of commonly-used Envoy Herbs (Guiding Herbs) in Traditional Chinese Medicine

This feudal-like hierarchy denotes the power and role of each substance in a given formula. The Jun is the substance which is usually of the highest relative dosage, and leads the main action of the formula. In the majority of formulas, there is only one Jun (Monarch) substance. Sometimes, a formula may feature 2-3 Jun substances, or lack a dominant Jun substances altogether. The Chen support the Jun in its actions, and provide additional uses for the medical purpose of the formula. The Zuo assist the Jun and Chen, but are given at a much lower dosage (relative to themselves), to deemphasize their influence, for various reasons. The Shi's main role is to help guide the formula to the correct bodily areas or organ systems inside of which it is meant to act. The Shi are also sometimes used "to harmonize the properties of other substances in the formula".

Most substances can serve as either Jun (Monarch), Chen (Minister) or Zuo (Assistant) – the first three tiers in the medicinal hierarchy. But only certain substances are considered fit to serve as Shi. This is because only some substances are believed to have the ability, to guide other substances into a given bodily area or organ system.

=== Matching and contrasting herbs ===
Within TCM formulas, there are also strict rules about which herbs pair well together (Dui Yao), and which are either contradictory, incompatible, or may cause a reaction amongst themselves, or with Western Medicine Drugs. For example: Gan Cao (Licorice) is incompatible with the herbs Yuan hua, Jing Da Ji, Hai Zao and Gan Sui. It may also alter the therapeutic effects of corticosteroids.

== Notable people ==
- Ji Desheng (1898–1981), Chinese herbalist from Nantong.
- Li Ching-Yuen (died 1933), Chinese herbalist, martial artist and tactical advisor.
- Aw Chu Kin (died 1908), Burmese Chinese herbalist, inventor of Tiger Balm.
- Ing Hay (1862–1952), migrated to the United States in 1887 and practiced traditional Chinese medicine in Oregon.

== See also ==
- Chinese classic herbal formula
- Chinese food therapy
- Chinese ophthalmology
- Compendium of Materia Medica
- Hallucinogenic plants in Chinese herbals
- Herbal medicine, for the use of medicinal herbs in other traditions.
- Japanese star anise
- Jiuhuang bencao
- Kampo (traditional Japanese medicine)
- Li Shizhen
- Pharmacognosy
- Star anise
- Traditional Chinese medicine
- Traditional Korean medicine
- Traditional Vietnamese medicine
- Yaoxing lun
