= Rhododendron qinghaiense =

Scientific classification
- Kingdom: Plantae
- Clade: Tracheophytes
- Clade: Angiosperms
- Clade: Eudicots
- Clade: Asterids
- Order: Ericales
- Family: Ericaceae
- Genus: Rhododendron
- Species: R. qinghaiense

Binomial name
- Rhododendron qinghaiense Ching ex W.Y.Wang

Synonyms
- Rhododendron qinghaiense Ching

Species of flowering plant

Rhododendron qinghaiense is a species of plant native to Asia. It is one of the 50 fundamental herbs used in traditional Chinese medicine, where it has the name Qīng hǎi dù juān (Chinese: 青海杜鹃).

== Traditional medicine ==
Rhododendron qinghaiense is one of the 50 fundamental herbs used in traditional Chinese medicine.
