= Gentiana loureiroi =

Scientific classification
- Kingdom: Plantae
- Clade: Tracheophytes
- Clade: Angiosperms
- Clade: Eudicots
- Clade: Asterids
- Order: Gentianales
- Family: Gentianaceae
- Genus: Gentiana
- Species: G. loureiroi

Binomial name
- Gentiana loureiroi (G.Don) Griseb.

Synonyms
- Ericala loureiroi G.Don; Gentiana pedicellata var. rosulata Kusn.; Varasia loureiroi (G.Don) Soják

Species of plant

Gentiana loureiroi is a species of plant native to Asia. It is one of the 50 fundamental herbs used in traditional Chinese medicine, where it has the name dì dīng (Chinese: 地丁).

== Traditional medicine ==
Gentiana loureiroi is one of the 50 fundamental herbs used in traditional Chinese medicine.
