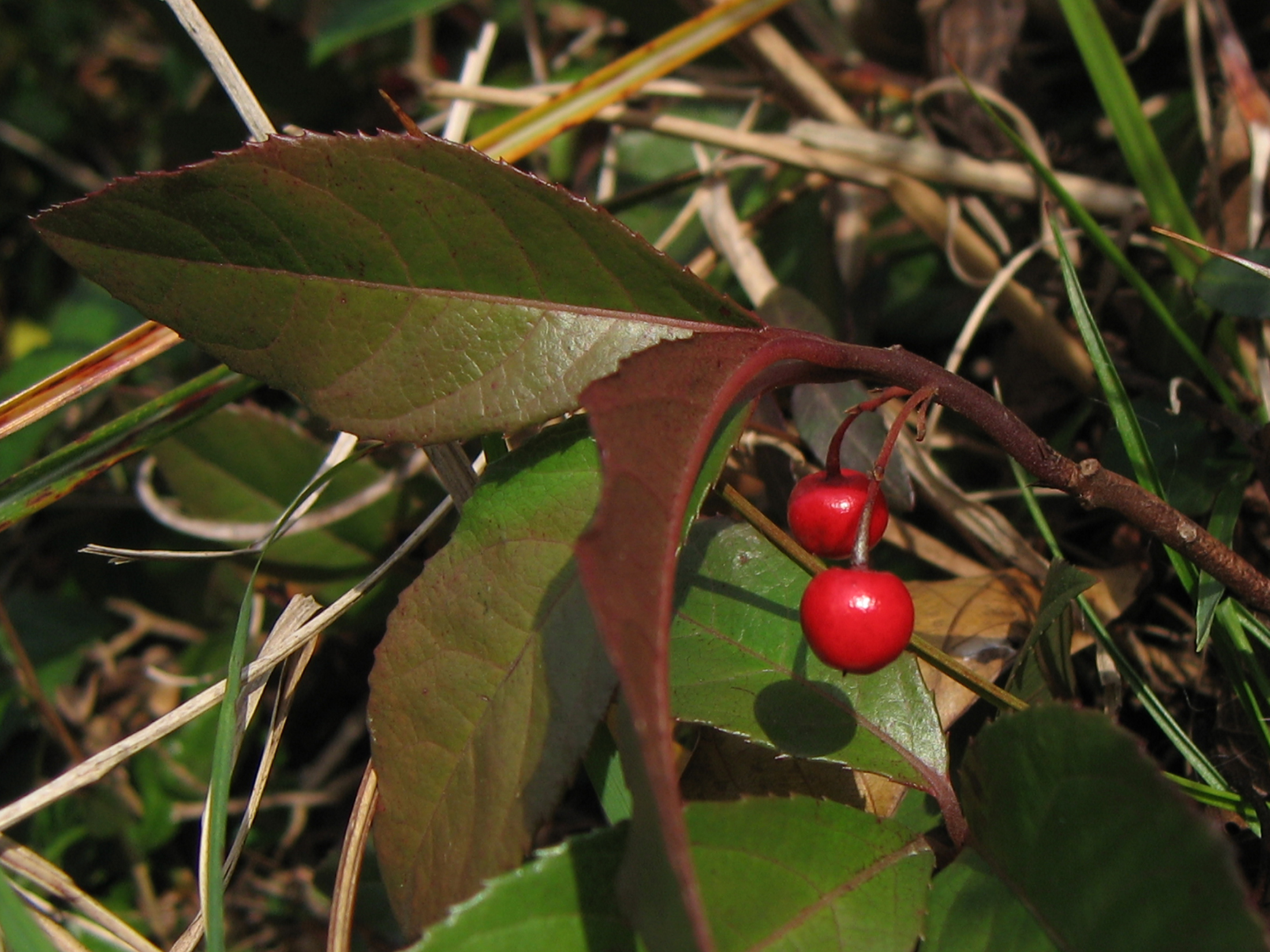

Scientific classification
- Kingdom: Plantae
- Clade: Tracheophytes
- Clade: Angiosperms
- Clade: Eudicots
- Clade: Asterids
- Order: Ericales
- Family: Primulaceae
- Genus: Ardisia
- Species: A. japonica

Binomial name
- Ardisia japonica (Thunb.) Blume

= Ardisia japonica =

Species of flowering plant

Ardisia japonica, known as marlberry, is a species of plant in the primrose family native to eastern Asia, in eastern China, Japan and Korea.

== Description ==
It is a low-growing, spreading very quickly evergreen shrub 20–40 cm tall. The leaves are opposite or in whorls, ovate, 4–7 cm long and 1.5–4 cm broad, with a sharply serrated margin and an acute apex. The fruit is a drupe 5–6 mm diameter, red maturing dark purple-black in early winter. The flowers are 4–10 mm diameter, with five (rarely six) white to pale pink petals; they are produced in racemes in late spring. The plant flowers from August to September.

A. japonica grows in dark, damp places in mixed forests and bamboo forests within 1200 metres of sea level.

== Uses ==
A number of cultivars have been selected for growing as ornamental plants, including 'Hakuokan' and 'Ito Fukurin' with variegated leaves, 'Hinotsukasa', with pale cream-coloured leaves, and 'Matsu Shima' with pink stems and variegated leaves.

A. japonica is one of the plants used in koten engei, a traditional form of Japanese horticulture. At least a dozen cultivars of the species are grown in this tradition, with varying shapes and coloration of leaves.

The plant is called Jūryō (十両) in Japanese. Because of the red berries and the word play of its name it is used during Japanese New Year for chabana decoration, normally along winter jasmine.

=== Medicinal uses ===
It is used as a medicinal plant in traditional Chinese medicine, where it is called zǐjīn niú (Chinese: 紫金牛), or aidicha (矮地茶) and is considered one of the 50 Fundamental Herbs.

Large doses of the plant as medicine can be toxic to the kidneys.

=== Weed problems ===
It has escaped from cultivation and established itself in the wild in the United States, in Gainesville, Florida, and possibly as far as South Carolina and Texas.

== See also ==
- Chinese herbology
- Ardisia crenata, (waxy leaves and red berries) also known as coral bush, coralberry tree, or spiceberry.
