= Traditional Vietnamese medicine =

Traditional medicine practiced by Vietnamese people

Traditional Vietnamese Medicine (Y học cổ truyền Việt Nam), also known as Southern Herbology (Thuốc Nam), are medical practices that developed in Vietnam and have been passed down through generations. These practices include local herbal medicine, acupuncture, message, and natural healing methods to support recovery and maintain health. While TVM is historically influenced by traditional Chinese medicine (Y học cổ truyền Trung Quốc), it has also developed through Vietnam's culture, environment, and knowledge of locally available medicinal plants and ingredients, resulting in remedies and treatments specifically adapted to the local Vietnamese population. Traditional Vietnamese medicine includes different ways of understanding illness and choosing treatments based on a person's symptoms and condition. Some people use traditional treatments with medical care as well, but the safety and effectiveness solely depends on the specific practice and conditions being treated.

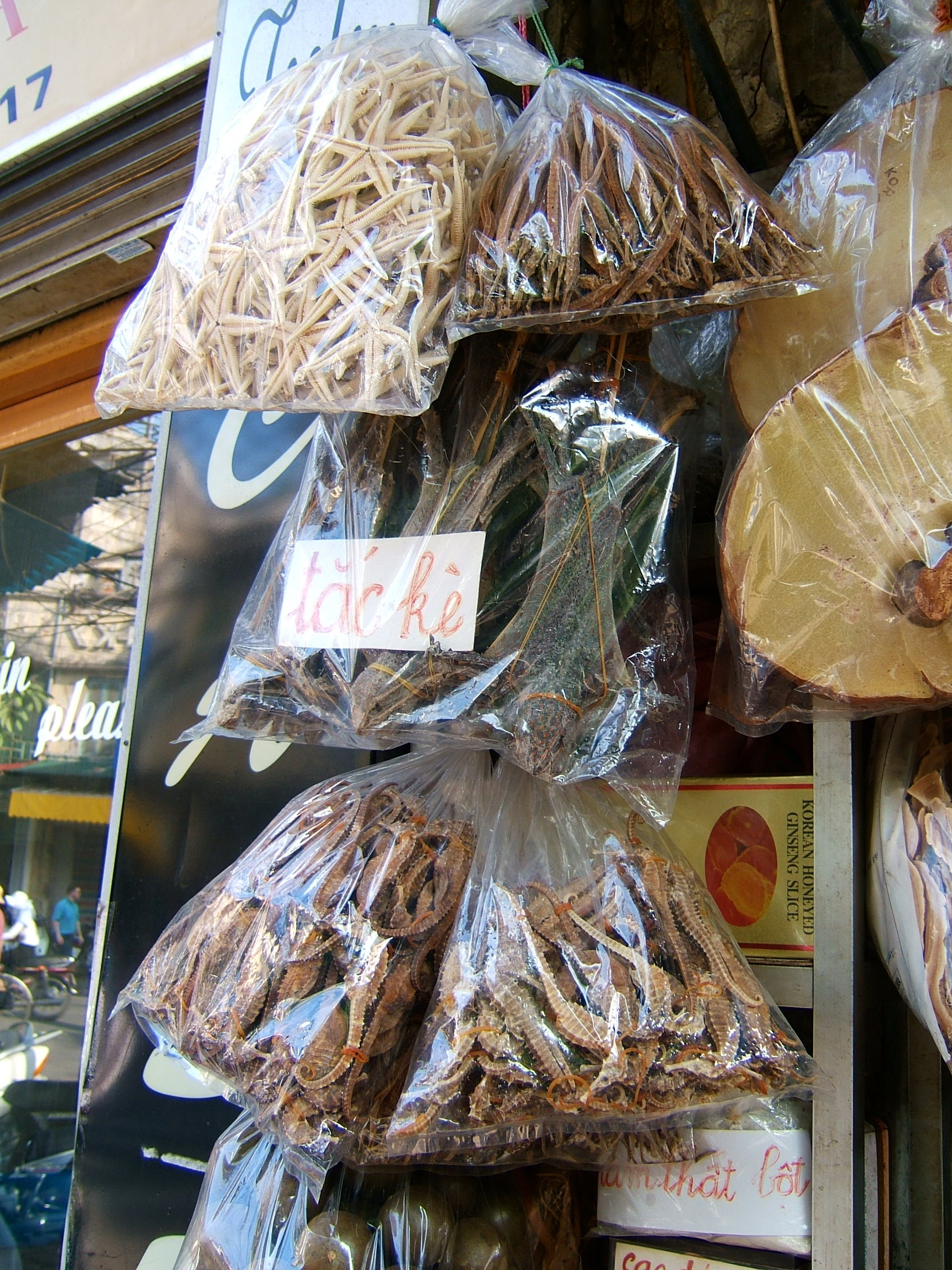
Native herbs from Vietnam

== History and development ==
Traditional Vietnamese medicine developed through the combination of local healing practices and medical knowledge inspired by China. Over time, Vietnamese practitioners adapted these influences to their environment and the medical tools available for them.

An influential figure in Vietnam's medical history was Tuệ Tĩnh, a physician traditionally associated with the development of indigenous herbal medicine. He came up with the principle, Nam dược trị Nam nhân, which translates to "Southern medicine for Southern people." This principle expresses the importance of using medicinal resources available in Vietnam to address the health needs in the Vietnamese population.

== Principles and philosophy ==
Traditional Vietnamese Medicine focuses on the body’s reactions and treats the body as an interconnected system. Its purpose is to restore balance within the body while identifying the underlying causes of illness. TVM connects the body, mind, and spirit and focuses on strengthening the body’s natural ability to recover. Treatments can be personalized depending on the individual and their symptoms.

== Herbal medicine ==
Traditional Vietnamese herbal medicine is used for a variety of health purposes. Many of which uses plants and combination if ingredients, depending on the intended traditional use.

Herbal preparation can be boiled into decoctions, steeped as inclusions, dried into powders or prepared as oils or topical treatments. Some also even use herbal baths and other sources of heat or steam, like heat therapy (liệu pháp xông hơi), which uses steam as part of the healing process.

Plants founded in Vietnamese food and local herbal practices include: Vietnamese coriander (rau răm), Vietnamese balm (kinh giới), crowndaisy (cải cúc), and water spinach (rau muống). Their uses vary, and a plant's use as food does not automatically mean that it has proven medical benefits.

Not every traditional remedy has been scientifically proven to work. The safety and effectiveness of an herbal preparation depend on the plant, the preparation method, the dosage, and the condition being assessed. Some herbs may be used with prescription medication.

Traditional use of herbal medicine:

Traditional Vietnamese herbal medicine has been used for many health-related purposes. Depending on the remedy, the uses may include:

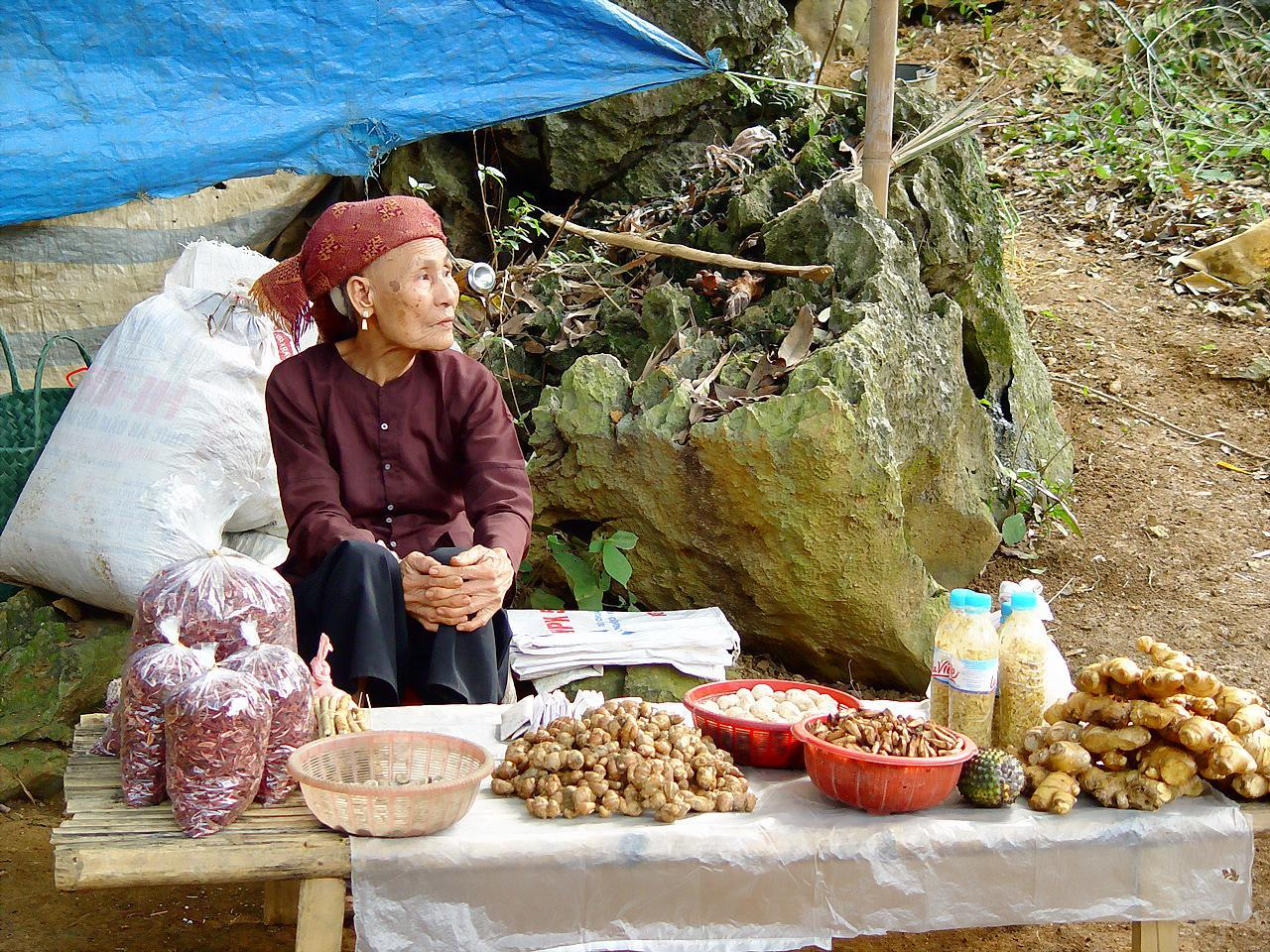
An old woman selling Thuốc Nam at Hương Temple

- Supporting digestion and relieving digestive complications
- Helping insomnia and other sleeping difficulties
- Supporting liver and kidney health
- Easing respiratory problems
- Reducing inflammation and fatigue

== Diagnosis, methods, and treatments ==
Traditional Vietnamese Medicine uses a variety of diagnostic methods and treatments. TVM is unlike other modern technical or chemical treatments, or drugs; they consist of: herbal medicine that focuses on steady recovery and wellness within body. Although most herbal medicines can taste bitter and depending on the dosage and medication, it will be taken regularly through forms of teas, powders, or other natural ingredients.

Acupuncture (Châm cứu): Uses thin needles to stimulate specific points on the body and is traditionally believed to influence the body’s energy and balance. Acupuncture may also affect the nerves, muscles, and connective tissue.

Therapeutic massage (Xoa bóp bấm huyệt): Uses physical manipulation of the body’s soft tissues and may help with relaxation, muscle tension, and circulation.

Cupping therapy (Giác hơi): Cups placed on the skin, typically the back to create suction and is traditionally used to relieve muscle tension and other symptoms.

- The color of the skin after cupping depicts the health of the patient.

Health-preservation exercises (Tập dưỡng sinh): Similar to Tai Chi, tập dưỡng sinh combines physical movement, breathing, and relaxation as part of maintaining the overall health. It is a form of two primary folk remedies used Vietnamese villagers to treat illness, maintain positive energy, and prevent diseases from forming.

Scraping Therapy (Cạo gió): A method to relief minor and temporarily illnesses, and pains through the use of either scraping the skin coated in a medicated oil, or balm with a spoon or the traditional way with a coin. The theory is caused by "bad wind" (trúng gió or phong), where negative energy is trapped in the body. The friction of cạo gió causes the skin to change to red, pink, or purple, indicating that the trapped "wind" is being scraped away from the body.

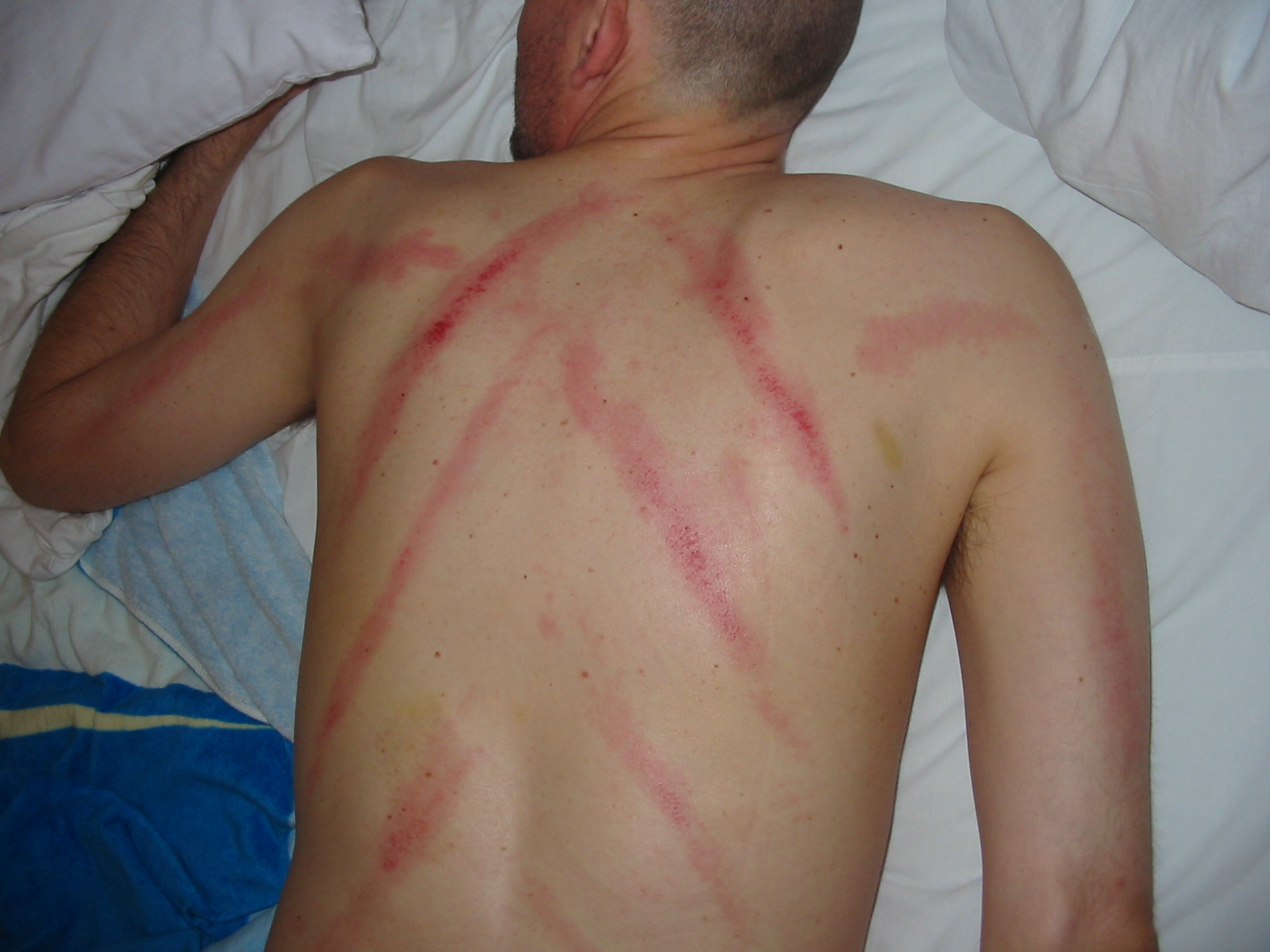
Cạo gió on a person

These practices are used for to reduce or help with chronic pain, sleeping problems, targeted health conditions, and long-term rehabilitation.

== Benefits of long-term usage ==
Traditional Vietnamese Medicine continues to be used in Vietnam and among Vietnamese communities around the world. Some people use traditional medicine with Western healthcare, while others use it as their main source of treatment for certain health concerns. The interest among these natural remedies and outcomes has increased awareness toward traditional medicine globally.
