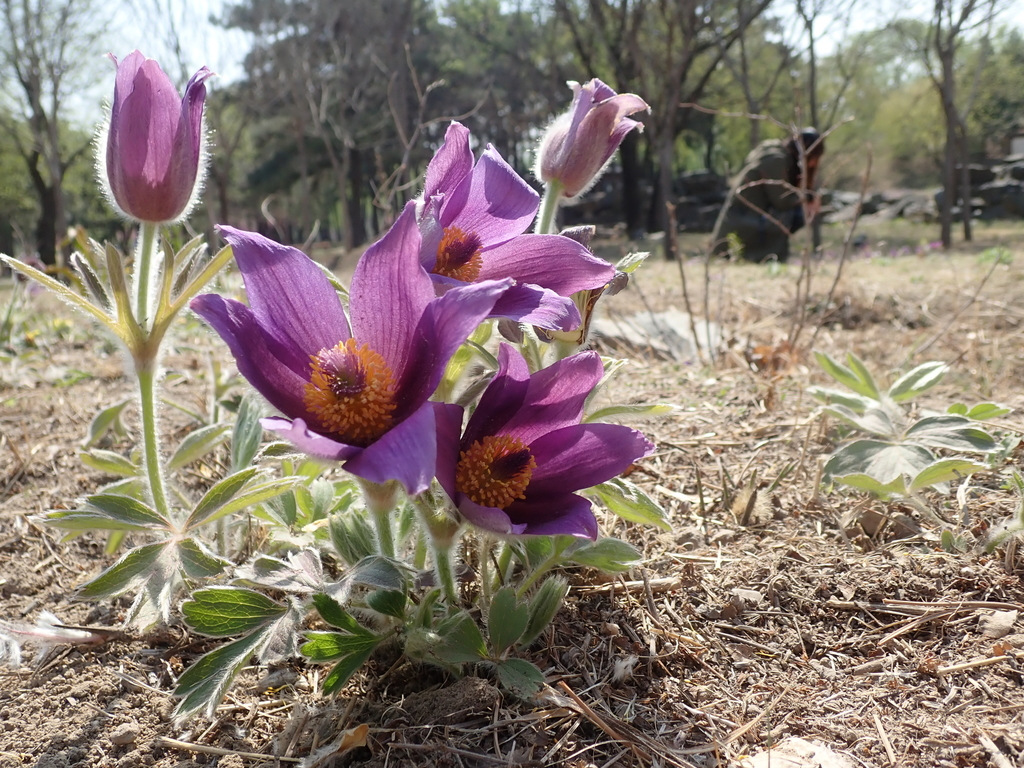
- Found in China

Scientific classification
- Kingdom: Plantae
- Clade: Tracheophytes
- Clade: Angiosperms
- Clade: Eudicots
- Order: Ranunculales
- Family: Ranunculaceae
- Genus: Pulsatilla
- Species: P. chinensis

Binomial name
- Pulsatilla chinensis (Bunge) Regel

Synonyms
- Anemone chinensis Bunge

= Pulsatilla chinensis =

Species of plant

Pulsatilla chinensis is a species of plant in the family Ranunculaceae and is one of the 50 fundamental herbs used in traditional Chinese medicine. There it has the name bái tóu wēng (Chinese: 白头翁).

== See also ==
- Chinese herbology
