= Yaoxing lun =

Tang dynasty treatise on herbal medicine

Yaoxing lun (simplified Chinese: 药性论; traditional Chinese: 藥性論; pinyin: Yàoxìng Lùn; Wade–Giles: Yao^{⁴}-hsing^{⁴} Lun^{⁴}), literally Treatise on the Nature of Medicinal Herbs, is a 7th-century Tang dynasty Chinese treatise on herbal medicine.

== See also ==
- Chinese herbology
- Compendium of Materia Medica
- Pharmacognosy
- Traditional Chinese medicine
