= Tabasheer =

Substance obtained from bamboo

Tabasheer (Hindustani: तबाशीर or طباشیر) or Banslochan (बंसलोचन, بنسلوچن), also spelt as Tabachir or Tabashir, is a translucent white substance, composed mainly of silica and water with traces of lime and potash, obtained from the nodal joints of some species of bamboo. It is part of the pharmacology of the traditional Ayurvedic and Unani systems of medicine of the Indian subcontinent. It is also an ingredient in many traditional Iranian and traditional Chinese medicines.

== Purported benefits ==
Tabasheer is claimed to provide a variety of health benefits. It is variously regarded as an antipyretic, antispasmodic, antiparalytic, restorative and aphrodisiac.

== Varieties ==
Tabasheer that has a blueish tint (usually called neel or neelkanth) is considered superior to tabasheer that has the "more plain" yellow or white color.

== Extraction ==
Not all bamboo stems contain tabasheer. Likely candidates are found by shaking bamboo stems, which can make the mineralized tabasheer inside produce a rattling sound. These stems are split open to extract the tabasheer.

== History ==
Although a part of the ancient Ayurvedic system of medicine, it has been postulated that the use of tabasheer originated in the Adivasi aboriginal tribes of India. Tabasheer was extensively exported from India for thousands of years, including through Arab traders during the medieval period. The town of Thane, close to the west coast of India, was famous as a clearing center for tabasheer in the twelfth century CE. It was called σάκχαρον in the writings of Pedanius Dioscorides, a Greek pharmacologist who practiced in Rome in the time of Nero.

== Etymology and alternative names ==
Tabasheer is referred to as Tvaksheera (त्वक्षीर) in Sanskrit, which means bark milk. Other Sanskrit-derived names have been applied to tabasheer as well, including bamboo sugar (vans-sharkar), bamboo camphor (vans karpoor) and bamboo manna. It is called Tian Zhu Huang in Mandarin, which means "heavenly bamboo yellow."
