= Chinese Medical Herbology and Pharmacology =

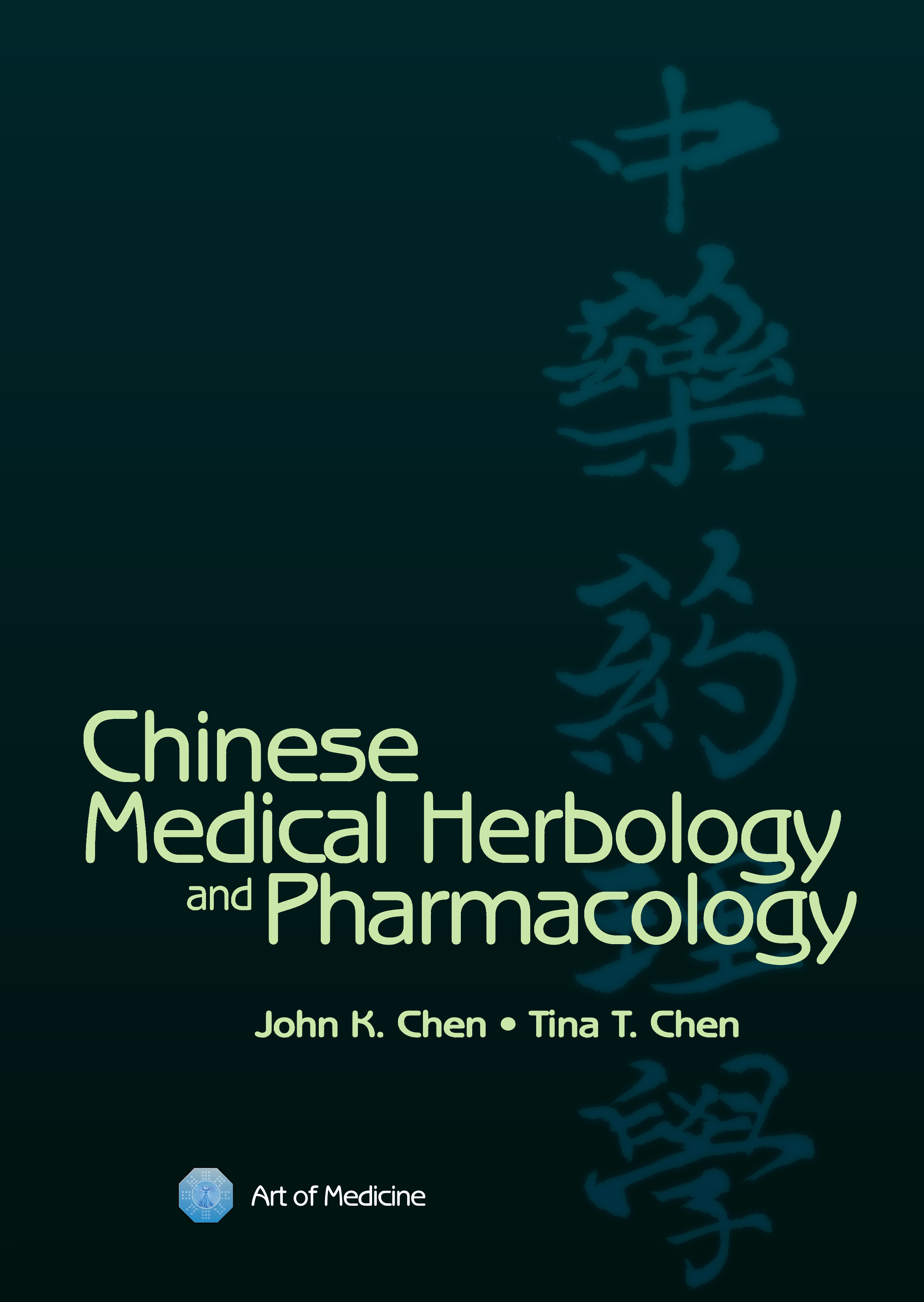
- Chinese Medical Herbology and Pharmacology Textbook
- Author: John K. Chen, Tina T. Chen
- Cover artist: Charles Funk
- Language: English
- Subject: Chinese herbology
- Publisher: Art of Medicine Press
- Publication date: 2004
- Publication place: USA
- Media type: Print (hardcover)
- Pages: 1336
- ISBN: 0-9740635-0-9
- Followed by: Chinese Herbal Formulas and Applications

Chinese Medical Herbology and Pharmacology is a textbook on Chinese herbology by John and Tina Chen. It includes descriptions and illustrations of traditional use of Chinese herbs, and also covers their historical usage.
