= Bu Zhong Yi Qi Tang =

Chinese classic herbal formula

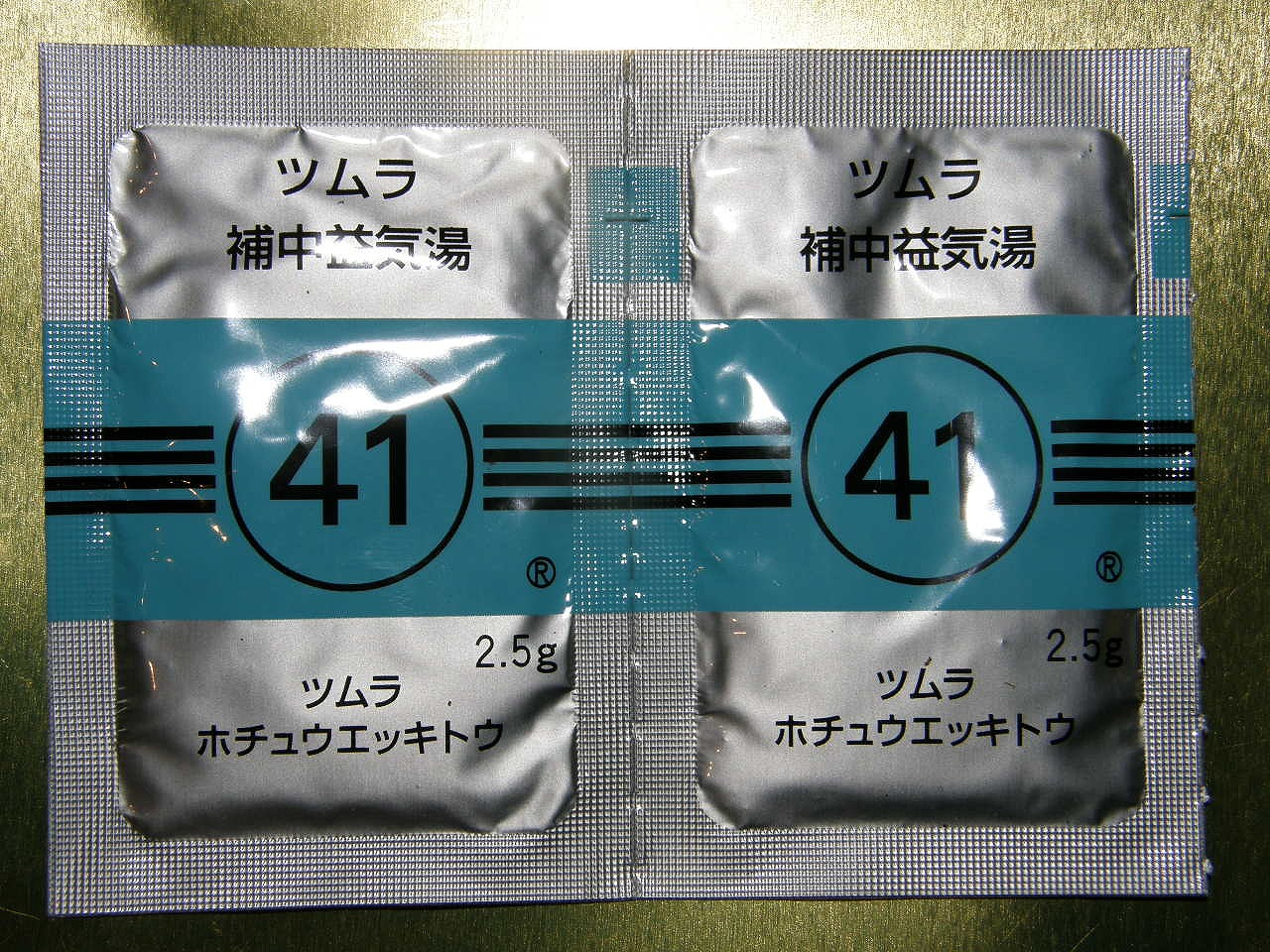

Bu Zhong Yi Qi Tang (simplified Chinese: 补中益气汤; traditional Chinese: 補中益氣湯; pinyin: bǔ zhōng yì qì wán) is a Chinese classic herbal formula. In Japanese kampo, it is known as "Hochū-ekki-tō" (補中益気湯 ほちゅうえっきとう) (it is also known as Kampo #41). It is commonly made into Chinese patent medicine.

== Variations ==
The formula was created by Lǐ Dōng-yuán (李东垣; 李東垣). It was published in "Treatise on the Spleen and Stomach" (脾胃论; 脾胃論; Pí Wèi Lùn) in 1249.

There are many variations of the formula proportions. Each maker of Chinese patent medicine changes the proportions of the herbs slightly. The proportions are standardized in the Japanese kampo formula, however. Some herbs may be changed also. For example, rén shēn (ginseng root) may be replaced with dǎng shēn ("poor man's ginseng").

The formula was also changed slightly when it was borrowed as a Japanese kampo formula. Some Chinese species of herbs were replaced with herbs found in Japan. For example, bái zhú (Atractylodes macrocephala) was replaced with cāng zhú (Atractylodes lancea).

== Chinese classic herbal formula ==
Name	Common Name	Pinyin	Chinese (T)	Chinese (S)	Katakana	Kanji	Genus species
Astragali Radix	astragalus root	huáng qí	黃耆	黄芪	オウギ	黄耆	Astragalus membranaceus
Atractylodis Rhizoma	white atractylodes rhizome	bái zhú	白朮	白术	ビャクジュツ	白朮	Atractylodes macrocephala
Panacis Ginseng Radix	ginseng root	rén shēn	人參	人参	ニンジン	人参	Panax ginseng
Angelicae Radix	Chinese angelica root	dāng guī	當歸	当归	トウキ	当帰	Angelica Sinensis
Bupleuri Radix	bupleurum root	chái hú	柴胡	柴胡	サイコ	柴胡	Bupleurum chinense
Zizyphi Fructus	jujube fruit, Chinese date	dà zǎo	大棗	大枣	タイソウ	大棗	Ziziphus zizyphus
Aurantii Nobilis Pericarpium	aged mandarin orange peel	chén pí	陳皮	陈皮	チンピ	陳皮	Citrus reticulata
Glycyrrhizae Radix	Chinese liquorice root	gān cǎo	甘草	甘草	カンゾウ	甘草	Glycyrrhiza uralensis
Cimicifugae Rhizoma	bugbane rhizome, cohosh rhizome	shēng má	升麻	升麻	ショウマ	升麻	Cimicifuga foetida
Zingiberis Rhizoma	fresh ginger rhizome	shēng jiāng	生薑	生姜	ショウキョウ	生姜	Zingiber officinale

== Japanese kampo formula ==
Name	Common name	Pinyin	Chinese (T)	Chinese (S)	Katakana	Kanji	Genus species	Grams	%
Astragali Radix	astragalus root	huáng qí	黃蓍	黄芪	オウギ	黄耆	Astragalus membranaceus	4.0	17%
Atractylodis Lanceae Rhizoma	atractylodes rhizome	cāng zhú	蒼朮	苍术	ソウジュツ	蒼朮	Atractylodes lancea	4.0	17%
Panacis Ginseng Radix	ginseng root	rén shēn	人參	人参	ニンジン	人参	Panax ginseng	4.0	17%
Angelicae Radix	Chinese angelica root	dāng guī	當歸	当归	トウキ	当帰	Angelica acutiloba	3.0	13%
Bupleuri Radix	bupleurum root	chái hú	柴胡	柴胡	サイコ	柴胡	Bupleurum falcatum	2.0	8%
Zizyphi Fructus	jujube seed, Chinese date seed	dà zǎo	大棗	大枣	タイソウ	大棗	Ziziphus zizyphus	2.0	8%
Aurantii Nobilis Pericarpium	aged mandarin orange peel	chén pí	陳皮	陈皮	チンピ	陳皮	Citrus reticulata	2.0	8%
Glycyrrhizae Radix	Chinese liquorice root	gān cǎo	甘草	甘草	カンゾウ	甘草	Glycyrrhiza uralensis	1.5	6%
Cimicifugae Rhizoma	bugbane rhizome, cohosh rhizome	shēng má	升麻	升麻	ショウマ	升麻	Cimicifuga simplex	1.0	4%
Zingiberis Rhizoma	fresh ginger rhizome	shēng jiāng	生薑	生姜	ショウキョウ	生姜	Zingiber officinale	0.5	2%

== See also ==
- Chinese herbology
- Chinese patent medicine
- Chinese classic herbal formula
- Ginger
- Kampo list
- Kampo herb list
