= Shi Quan Da Bu Wan =

Chinese classic herbal formula

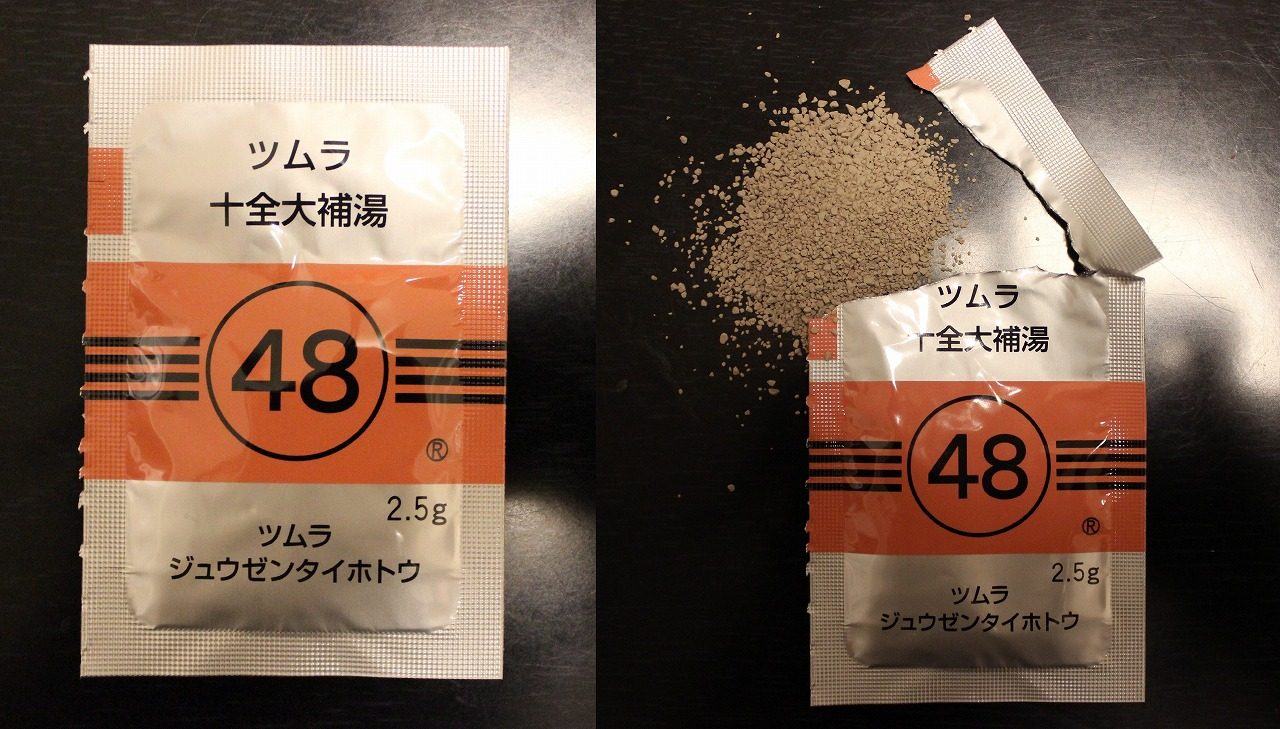

Shi Quan Da Bu Wan, also known as Shiquan Dabu teapills (simplified Chinese: 十全大补丸; traditional Chinese: 十全大補丸; pinyin: shíquán dàbǔ wán), is a Chinese classic herbal formula. In Japanese kampo, it is known as "Jūzen-daiho-tō" (十全大補湯 じゅうぜんだいほとう) (it is also known as Kampo #48). It is commonly made into Chinese patent medicine. It is composed of two famous formulas which tonify the blood (si wu wan) and the qi (si jun zi wan) plus the addition of huang qi and rou gui.

== Variations ==
The formula was published in the "Tai Ping Imperial Grace Formulary" (tài píng huì mín hé jì jú fāng, T: 太平惠民和劑局方, S: 太平惠民和剂局方) in 992CE.

There are many variations of the formula proportions. Each maker of Chinese patent medicine changes the proportions of the herbs slightly. The proportions in the Japanese kampo formula are standardized, however. Some herbs may be changed also. For example, rén shēn (ginseng root) may be replaced with dǎng shēn ("poor man's ginseng").

The formula was also changed slightly when it was borrowed as a Japanese kampo formula. Some Chinese species of herbs were replaced with herbs found in Japan. For example, bái zhú (Atractylodes macrocephala) was replaced with cāng zhú (Atractylodes lancea).

== Chinese classic herbal formula ==
Name	Common Name	Pinyin	Chinese (T)	Chinese (S)	Katakana	Kanji	Genus species
Astragali Radix	astragalus root	huáng qí	黃蓍	黄芪	オウギ	黄耆	Astragalus membranaceus
Cinnamomi Cortex	Chinese cinnamon bark	ròu guì	肉桂	肉桂	ケイヒ	桂皮	Cinnamomum cassia
Rehmanniae Radix	Chinese foxglove root	shú dì huáng	熟地黃	熟地黄	ジオウ	地黄	Rehmannia glutinosa
Paeoniae Radix	Chinese peony root	sháo yào	芍藥	芍药	シャクヤク	芍薬	Paeonia lactiflora
Ligustici Rhizoma	ligusticum rhizome	chuān xiōng	川芎	川芎	センキュウ	川芎	Ligusticum wallichii
Angelicae Radix	Chinese angelica root	dāng guī	當歸	当归	トウキ	当帰	Angelica sinensis
Panacis Ginseng Radix	ginseng root	rén shēn	人參	人参	ニンジン	人参	Panax ginseng
Poria	tuckahoe mushroom	fú líng	茯苓	茯苓	ブクリョウ	茯苓	Poria cocos
Atractylodis Rhizoma	white atractylodes rhizome	bái zhú	白朮	白术	ビャクジュツ	白朮	Atractylodes macrocephala
Glycyrrhizae Radix	Chinese liquorice root	gān cǎo	甘草	甘草	カンゾウ	甘草	Glycyrrhiza uralensis

== Japanese kampo formula ==
Name	Common name	Pinyin	Chinese (T)	Chinese (S)	Katakana	Kanji	Genus species	Grams	%
Astragali Radix	astragalus root	huáng qí	黃蓍	黄芪	オウギ	黄耆	Astragalus membranaceus	3.0	10.5%
Cinnamomi Cortex	Chinese cinnamon bark	ròu guì	肉桂	肉桂	ケイヒ	桂皮	Cinnamomum cassia	3.0	10.5%
Rehmanniae Radix	Chinese foxglove root	shú dì huáng	熟地黃	熟地黄	ジオウ	地黄	Rehmannia glutinosa	3.0	10.5%
Paeoniae Radix	Chinese peony root	sháo yào	芍藥	芍药	シャクヤク	芍薬	Paeonia lactiflora	3.0	10.5%
Cnidii Rhizoma	cnidium root	she chuang zi	川芎	川芎	センキュウ	川芎	Cnidium officinale	3.0	10.5%
Atractylodis Lanceae Rhizoma	atractylodes rhizome	cāng zhú	蒼朮	苍术	ソウジュツ	蒼朮	Atractylodes lancea	3.0	10.5%
Angelicae Radix	Chinese angelica root	dāng guī	當歸	当归	トウキ	当帰	Angelica acutiloba	3.0	10.5%
Panacis Ginseng Radix	ginseng root	rén shēn	人參	人参	ニンジン	人参	Panax ginseng	3.0	10.5%
Poria	tuckahoe mushroom	fú líng	茯苓	茯苓	ブクリョウ	茯苓	Poria cocos	3.0	10.5%
Glycyrrhizae Radix	Chinese liquorice root	gān cǎo	甘草	甘草	カンゾウ	甘草	Glycyrrhiza uralensis	1.5	5.5%

== See also ==
- Chinese classic herbal formula
- Chinese patent medicine
- Chinese classic herbal formula
- Kampo list
- Kampo herb list
