= Yokukansan =

Drug in traditional Chinese medicine

Yokukansan (written as 抑肝散 and read as Yokukansan in Japanese while YiganSan in Chinese) is a standard recipe or prescription from traditional Chinese medicine used widely in Eastern Asian countries including China, Taiwan, North and South Koreas and Japan. There are some classical text books describing YKS for example 『保嬰金鏡録』 (Prescriptions for pediatrics』by 薛己 Xue Ji in 1550), 『保嬰撮要』 (Bao ying cuo yao) by 薛鎧 (Xue Kai in 1556) and others. But only 薛己 (Xue Ji) described it as "愚製(my original)" in his book, so that 薛己 (Xue Ji) is probably the originator of this recipe. Yokukansan (YKS) contains an exactly measured mixture of dried herbs, 3g of Atractylodes macrocephala macrocephala Koidz. (白术(炒)) in China or 4 g of Atractylodes lanceae rhizoma (蒼朮) in Japan, 4 g of Poria (伏苓), 3 g of Cnidii rhizoma (川芎), 3 g of Angelicae radix (当帰), 2 g of Bupleuri radix (柴胡), 1.5 g of Glycyrrhizae radix (甘草), and 3 g of Uncariae uncis cum ramulus (釣藤鈎).

薛鎧 (Xue Kai), the father of 薛己 (Xue Ji) explained this recipe in his text book 保嬰撮要 (Bao ying cuo yao) thus:

"This recipe improves convulsion, fever, gnash, unsettled state of mind, and terror caused by enervation. Also, it is effective for vomiting, feeling of fullness, appetite loss and dysnystaxis caused by stress".

The name of the text book 保嬰撮要 (Bao ying cuo yao) means "The essence of Pediatrics", so 薛鎧 (Xue Kai) and his son 薛己 (Xue Ji) may have used YKS mainly for children.

In 2005, the efficacy of YKS for behavioral and psychological symptoms of dementia (BPSD) such as hallucination, delusion, easy to anger and so on in demented patients was reported in randomized controlled study (RCT), and meta-analysis showed the same result. Moreover, YKS is also effective for visual hallucination in Lewy body disease(DLB). Therefore, YKS Is widely applied to BPSD and DLB treatment in Japan. The sale of YKS by Tsumura company (the top company of traditional herbal medicines for medical use of Japan) was 5903000000 Japanese yen in 2017 (https://www.tsumura.co.jp/zaimu/library/tanshin/pdf/20180207hosoku.pdf). It is the runners up in all traditional herbal medicines for medical use in Japan.

Though 227 medical papers are hit in PubMed on 27 March 2021, the whole mechanisms of YKS efficacy are still not perfectly clear. At least, there are many reports suggesting that it may have effect on serotonin receptors and glutamate transporters. Further mechanisms will be reported in the future.

== History ==
There are some classical text books describing YKS for example 『保嬰金鏡録』 (Prescriptions for pediatrics』by 薛己 Xue Ji in 1550), 『保嬰撮要』 (Bao ying cuo yao) by 薛鎧 (Xue Kai in 1556) and others. But only 薛己 (Xue Ji) wrote that "愚製 (my original)" in his book, so that 薛己 (Xue Ji) may be the originator of this recipe.

== See also ==
- Traditional Chinese medicine
- Kampo herb list
- Kampo list
