= Atractylodin =

Names
- IUPAC name 2-[(1E,7E)-nona-1,7-dien-3,5-diynyl]furan

Identifiers
CAS Number	55290-63-6
3D model (JSmol)	Interactive image
ChEBI	CHEBI:80795
ChEMBL	ChEMBL5564895
ChemSpider	4478932
EC Number	878-371-0
KEGG	C16918
PubChem CID	5321047
UNII	V73E8B6UAC
CompTox Dashboard (EPA)	DTXSID901019940
- InChI: InChI=1S/C13H10O/c1-2-3-4-5-6-7-8-10-13-11-9-12-14-13/h2-3,8-12H,1H3/b3-2+,10-8+ Key: GRBKWAXRYIITKG-QFMFQGICSA-N
- SMILES: C/C=C/C#CC#C/C=C/C1=CC=CO1

Properties
Chemical formula	C_{13}H_{10}O
Molar mass	182.222 g·mol^{−1}
Appearance	brown powder
Melting point	52 °C (126 °F; 325 K)
- Except where otherwise noted, data are given for materials in their standard state (at 25 °C [77 °F], 100 kPa). Infobox references

Atractylodin is a polyyne found in Atractylodes, in particular Atractylodes lancea and Atractylodes chinensis. It serves as the primary active component and the characteristic aromatic constituent in the volatile oil of the traditional Chinese medicine Cāng zhú, which is derived from the dried rhizomes of Atractylodes species.

Atractylodin exhibits a range of pharmacological activities, including regulation of gastrointestinal motility, anti-inflammatory, antiviral, and antioxidant effects. These combined activities form the pharmacological basis for the traditional use of Cāng zhú, often as a key ingredient in formulations such as Pingwei San and Po Chai Pills, to treat symptoms like abdominal bloating, loss of appetite, and diarrhea.
