= Shakuyaku-kanzo-to =

Traditional East Asian herbal medicine

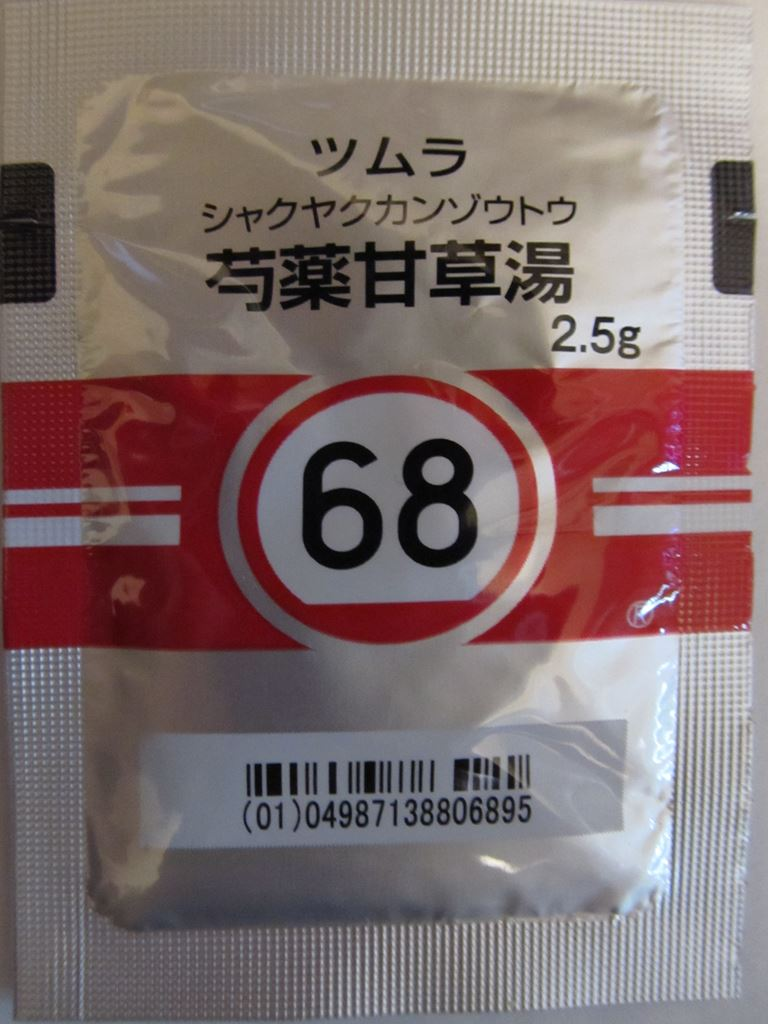
A commercial extract of the traditional Japanese formula Shakuyaku-kanzo-to, sold as Tsumura No. 68.

Shakuyaku-kanzo-to (Japanese: 芍薬甘草湯, Hepburn: Shakuyaku-kanzō-tō) or shao-yao-gan-cao-tang (Chinese: 芍药甘草丸; pinyin: sháo yào gān cǎo wán) is a traditional herbal medicine used in both Kampo (Japanese) and Chinese medicine. It consists of an equal combination of the roots of Chinese peony root (Radix Paeoniae, shakuyaku) and licorice root (Radix Glycyrrhizae, kanzō), primarily used for its antispasmodic properties in the treatment of muscle cramps and various other conditions involving smooth and skeletal muscle spasms.

The formula was first described in the Shanghan Lun, a classical Chinese medical textbook during the Eastern Han dynasty, and has been standardized in modern Japan for both traditional and clinical use. Its main active compounds, paeoniflorin and glycyrrhizin, are believed to act synergistically at neuromuscular junctions and on prostaglandin synthesis. While generally safe in short-term use, long-term or high-dose intake can cause side effects such as pseudohyperaldosteronism, a hormone-related disorder, due to the effects of glycyrrhizin.

== History ==
The formula now known in Japanese as shakuyaku-kanzo-to (Japanese: 芍薬甘草湯, Hepburn: Shakuyaku-kanzō-tō) originates from classical Chinese medicine, where it is referred to as shao-yao-gan-cao-tang (Chinese: 芍药甘草丸; pinyin: sháo yào gān cǎo wán). It was first recorded in the ancient Chinese medical textbook Shanghan Lun (Chinese: 伤寒论; pinyin: Shānghán Lùn), compiled by Zhang Zhongjing during the Eastern Han dynasty (c. 25–220 AD). The formula was traditionally prescribed to relieve muscle pain and spasms, and its use gradually became established across East Asia.

During the medieval and early modern periods, Chinese herbal medicine was introduced to Japan and adapted into what became known as Kampo medicine—a system of traditional Japanese herbal therapy. Shakuyaku-kanzo-to was one of many classical Chinese formulas incorporated into the Kampo system. In the 20th century, shakuyaku-kanzo-to became one of the standardized formulas approved for clinical use in Japan under the modern Kampo framework. Kampo formulas, including shakuyaku-kanzo-to, are regulated by the Ministry of Health, Labour and Welfare and are widely prescribed in both traditional and conventional medical settings. It is included among the 148 Kampo extract formulas approved for prescription by the government and is covered under the National Health Insurance Drug Tariff. In Japan, it is manufactured under standardized preparations such as Tsumura No. 68. It was also reported that shakuyaku-kanzo-to has usage on Korea, where it is called jakyakgamcho-tang.

== Composition ==
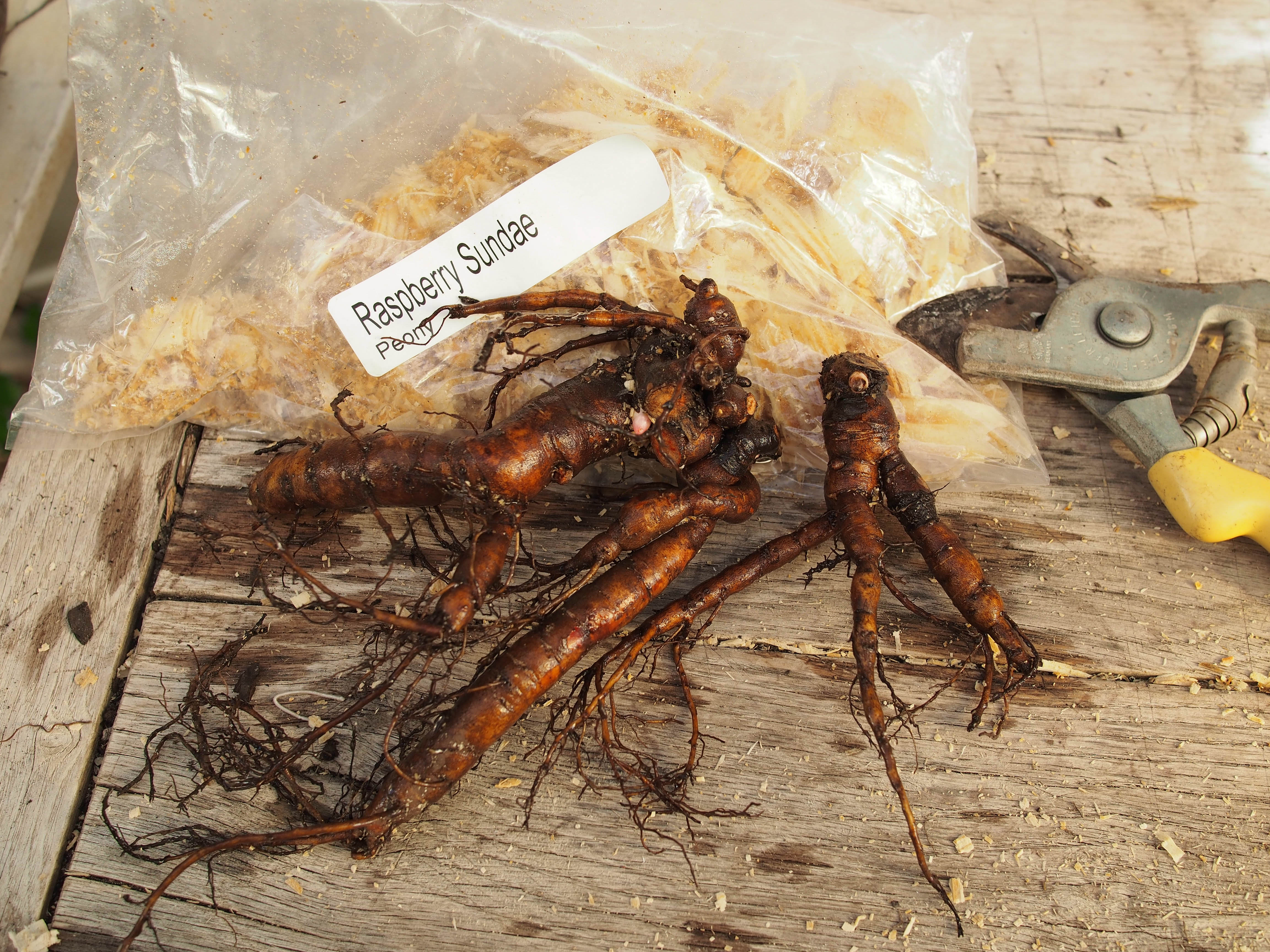
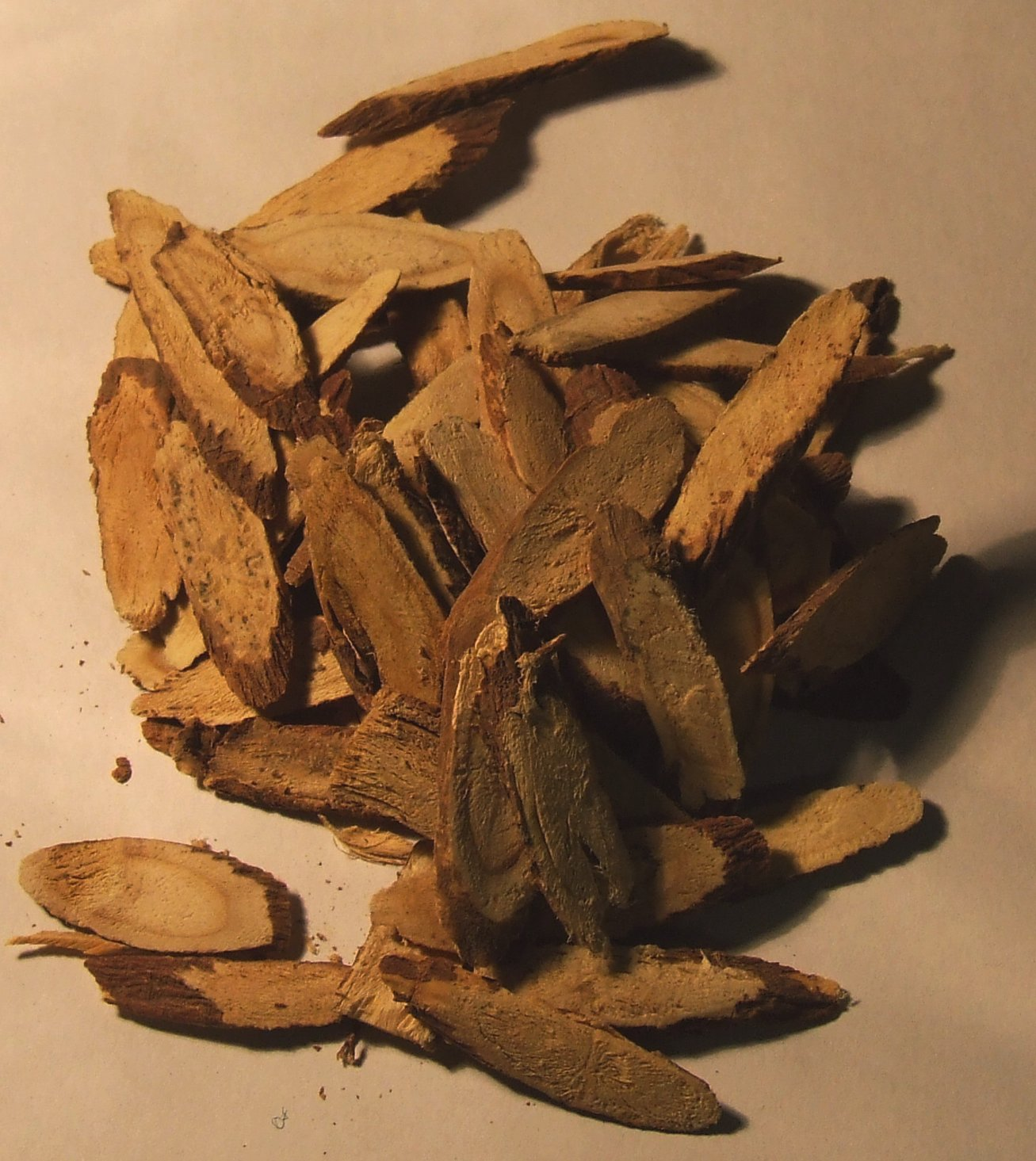
Root extract piles of Chinese peony (left) and licorice (right)

Shakuyaku-kanzo-to is made from a freeze-dried extract of two medicinal plants:

- Paeoniae radix (Note: Paeoniae radix and Glycyrrhizae radix are the pharmacopoeial names for the dried root of Paeonia lactiflora and Glycyrrhiza glabra, respectively, in traditional Chinese and Japanese medicine.) (Chinese peony root; shakuyaku in Japanese, bai shao in Chinese)
- Glycyrrhizae radix (licorice root; kanzō in Japanese, zhi gan cao in Chinese)

The key active constituents are paeoniflorin, found in peony root (shakuyaku), and glycyrrhizin, found in licorice root (kanzō). Glycyrrhizin is metabolized in the human gut into glycyrrhetinic acid, which is pharmacologically active. A 1:1 ratio (30g:30g) of peony (Paeonia lactiflora) to licorice (Glycyrrhiza uralensis) is commonly used. Hot water extraction and its active constituents has been employed for in vitro testing.

== Traditional uses ==
Shakuyaku-kanzo-to has been traditionally employed for its antispasmodic properties and is used in the treatment of various crampings and spasmodic conditions. In Kampo medicine, it is prescribed for muscle cramps, including those associated with lumbar spinal stenosis, as well as dysmenorrhea, arthralgia and abdominal pain caused by smooth muscle contractions. In traditional Chinese medicine, it is also used to nourish yin. It has also been utilized to relieve the pain caused by gallstones or kidney stones that obstruct ducts or passageways and has found application in the suppression of peristalsis during diagnostic procedures such as endoscopy or a lower gastrointestinal series.

== Mechanism of action ==
The pharmacological mechanisms of shakuyaku-kanzo-to are not yet fully understood, but several pathways have been proposed. It is believed to exert antispasmodic effects by acting at neuromuscular junctions and modulating spinal pathways to reduce nociception. At the cellular level, shakuyaku-kanzo-to appears to inhibit muscle contraction by promoting potassium efflux and blocking calcium influx via calcium-activated potassium channels. The endocrine-modulating actions of shakuyaku-kanzo-to is believed to be primarily ovarian, though hepatic metabolism may also play a role, especially in the divergent effects observed at high doses of kanzō. Glycyrrhetinic acid, for instance, is known to influence hepatic steroid metabolism, which may partially account for these findings.

Studies from The Kobe Journal of Medical Sciences suggest that the combination of paeoniflorin and glycyrrhizin exerts a synergistic effect. Experimental models using mouse phrenic nerve preparations have shown that while these compounds are ineffective individually, their combination can inhibit neuromuscular junctions. With regard to uterine muscle activity, the inhibitory effect is thought to be primarily due to the kanzō component. In studies involving cultured human uterine myometrial cells, shakuyaku-kanzo-to and its component kanzō were found to significantly decrease the production of prostaglandins PGE2, PGF_{2α}, and 6-ketoPGF1α in a dose-dependent manner. Shakuyaku alone did not produce the same inhibitory effect. The reduction in prostaglandin production was linked to the suppression of cytosolic phospholipase A2 activity, an enzyme involved in releasing arachidonic acid, the precursor for prostaglandin synthesis. Additionally, kanzō has been found to inhibit phosphodiesterase 3, contributing to its smooth muscle relaxant properties.

== Administration ==
Shakuyaku-kanzo-to is administered primarily in oral form, available as extract granules, pills (shao-yao-gan-cao-tang), or as a decoction prepared via hot water extraction. The formulation is commonly prescribed in divided doses two to three times daily. The standard adult dosage of shakuyaku-kanzo-to is typically 7.5 grams per day, divided into multiple doses. However, lower doses, such as 2.5 grams taken as needed, have been reported to provide comparable relief in patients with lumbar spinal stenosis.

In clinical practice, minimizing the dosage is often emphasized to reduce the risk of adverse effects. The onset of action varies, with effects often observed within three days but occasionally taking one to two weeks. Delayed onset may be related to individual variations in gut microbiota that affect paeoniflorin metabolism. In experimental studies involving animal models, the formulation has been administered orally or intraperitoneally.

=== Adverse effects ===
A well-documented adverse effect of shakuyaku-kanzo-to is pseudohyperaldosteronism, a condition that mimics the effects of excess aldosterone activity, caused by the chronic or high-dose consumption glycyrrhizin content of Glycyrrhizae radix. Glycyrrhizin and its metabolite glycyrrhetinic acid inhibit the enzyme corticosteroid 11-beta-dehydrogenase isozyme 2, resulting in elevated cortisol levels that activate mineralocorticoid receptors. This mimics the effects of aldosterone and can lead to hypokalemia, hypertension, fluid retention, and in severe cases, arrhythmias, heart failure, or hypokalemic rhabdomyolysis.

Risk factors for pseudohyperaldosteronism include prolonged use of shakuyaku-kanzo-to (exceeding 30 days), advanced age (particularly over 60 years), and concomitant use of other medications that lower potassium levels. While earlier reports characterized pseudohyperaldosteronism as an idiosyncratic reaction, later studies have established dose- and duration-dependent associations. Due to the risk of adverse effects, shakuyaku-kanzo-to is typically recommended for short-term use, often no more than 14 days, and is sometimes used as a rescue medication. Patients receiving shakuyaku-kanzo-to—especially those with pre-existing electrolyte imbalances, cardiovascular diseases, or those taking other Glycyrrhiza-containing products—should be closely monitored. Routine checks of serum potassium levels and blood pressure are advised.

In clinical trials, the incidence of adverse events with shakuyaku-kanzo-to was reported at 14.3%, compared to 4.9% in the placebo group, though the difference was not statistically significant. In a study on lumbar spinal stenosis, only one case of dizziness was reported, occurring in an elderly patient with a history of cerebral infarction.

== Clinical studies ==
A 2:1 ratio has shown greater efficacy than a 1:1 ratio in reducing serum prolactin in female schizophrenia patients treated with risperidone. When SKT was tested alongside risperidone, it lowered prolactin levels without diminishing the antipsychotic efficacy, as measured by PANSS scores. When assessed against other treatments for muscle cramps, shakuyaku-kanzo-to was more effective than placebo in some studies but less effective than goshajinkigan. It outperformed eperisone hydrochloride in lumbar spinal stenosis-related muscle cramping, though these findings lacked robust statistical support. SKT also demonstrated superior inhibitory effects on cardiac hypertrophy in neonatal rat ventricular myocytes compared to nifedipine, potentially due to its broader mechanistic actions. Nonetheless, its higher licorice content correlates with an increased risk of pseudoaldosteronism compared to similar licorice-containing formulas like sho-saiko-to.

Studies by the medical journal Cureus have shown that shakuyaku-kanzo-to exerts stronger inhibitory effects on angiotensin II-induced cardiomyocyte hypertrophy than the L-type calcium channel blocker nifedipine. In co-administration scenarios, such as with risperidone or nifedipine, shakuyaku-kanzo-to displayed beneficial effects. It mitigated drug-induced side effects without compromising therapeutic benefits, although in the case of nifedipine, the interaction did not demonstrate clear synergy. The combined treatment did, however, produce overlapping effects on calcium and reactive oxygen species levels in cardiac cells.

Comparisons with its individual components revealed that kanzō alone was largely responsible for inhibiting uterine contractions, while both kanzō and shakuyaku influenced testosterone levels in female rats through ovarian mechanisms. Shakuyaku-kanzo-to and its individual ingredients also suppressed prostaglandin production and altered pain stimulus, with peony playing a more significant role in alleviating paclitaxel-induced neuropathy. In ovarian tissue experiments, paeoniflorin, glycyrrhizin and glycyrrhetinic acid all reduced testosterone production, with glycyrrhetinic acid notably increasing the estradiol-to-testosterone ratio.
