= C13H10O =

The molecular formula C_{13}H_{10}O (molar mass: 182.22 g/mol, exact mass: 182.0732 u) may refer to:

- Atractylodin
- Benzophenone
- Fluorenol
- Xanthene (9H-xanthene, 10H-9-oxaanthracene)
