= Po Chai Pills =

Traditional Chinese medicine product

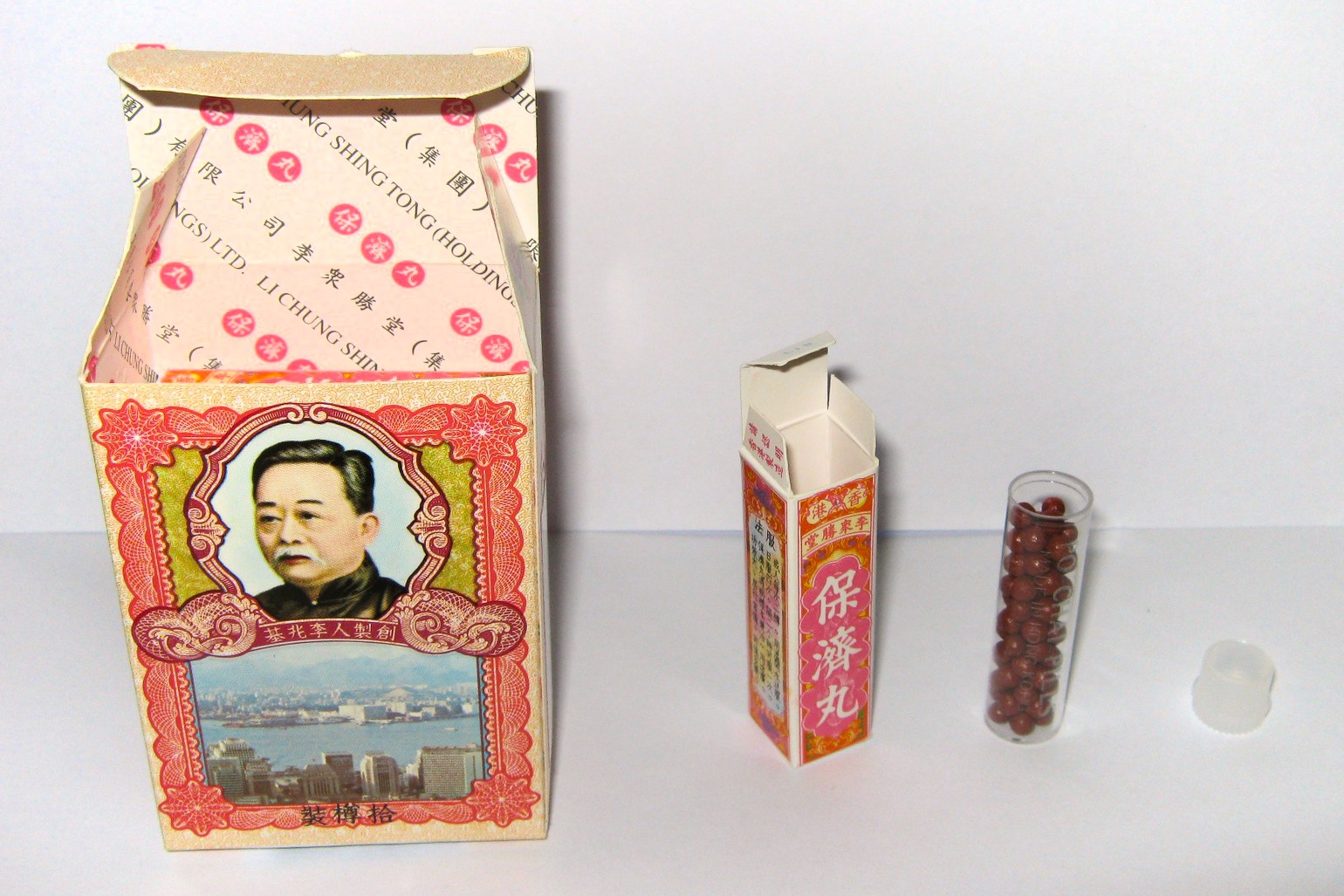
Po Chai Pills in bottle form

Po Chai Pills (simplified Chinese: 保济丸; traditional Chinese: 保濟丸; Jyutping: bou2 zai3 jyun2; pinyin: bǎojìwán) is a traditional Chinese medicine product made from several herbs formed into tiny spherical pills about 4 mm in diameter. It is used as a remedy for the relief of indigestion, heartburn, vomiting, diarrhea, and bloating. It can also be used as a hangover prevention remedy.

== History ==
Po Chai Pills were developed by Li Shiu Kei in Foshan, Guangdong, in 1896. Following the Chinese Civil War, the Li family fled to Hong Kong and reestablished their company, Li Chung Shing Tong. However, their mainland property was nationalized. As a result, there are now two manufacturers of Po Chai Pills:

- Li Chung Shing Tong (Holdings) Limited (李眾勝堂(集團)有限公司) in Hong Kong; and
- Guangzhou Wanglaoji Pharmaceutical Company Limited (廣州王老吉葯業股份有限公司) in Guangzhou, China.

A mutual agreement between both parties has limited Wanglaoji's trademark rights to mainland China, while Li Chung Shing Tong has the rights to use the trademark in the rest of the world. The mainland manufacturer exports them from China as Curing Pills or Bao Ji Pills.

On 8 March 2010, sales of the pills and the capsule form of Po Chai from Li Chung Shing Tong were temporarily halted in Singapore as a precaution because traces of phenolphthalein and sibutramine were detected by the company in batches of the capsule form of Po Chai, and were recalled. Phenolphthalein's past use for its laxative properties has been discontinued because of concerns it may be carcinogenic. On 24 March 2010, Hong Kong's Department of Health recalled both Po Chai Pills Capsule Form and Po Chai Pills Bottle Form from local retail outlets and consumers.

On 11 May 2010, a licensed manufacturer in proprietary Chinese medicine, Li Chung Shing Tong (Holdings) Ltd. HK was given the green light to resume production and marketing of Po Chai Pills Bottle Form. Laboratory tests identified 11 tainted samples, all in Capsule Form, while none of the Bottle Form samples was found to contain the above two western medicines. In connection, the manufacturer has withdrawn the application for registration of Po Chai Pills Capsule Form which ceased to be produced in late March 2010.

== Ingredients ==
The lists of known ingredients for Po Chai pills are listed as follows:

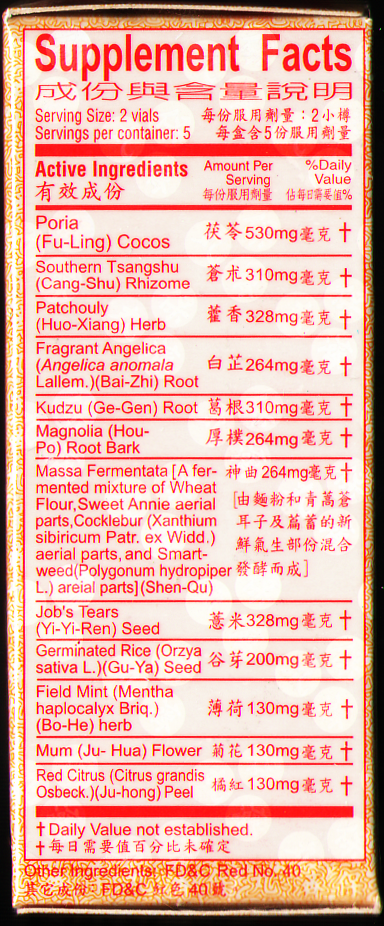
Proprietary ingredients in Po Chai Pills

- Poria cocos (茯苓, Fú-Líng) Sclerotium
- Southern Tsangshu (蒼朮 (苍术), Cāng-Zhú) Rhizome
- Chinese patchouli (藿香, Huò-Xiāng) herb
- Fragrant Angelica (白芷 Bái-Zhǐ) Root (Angelica dahurica, (Fisch. ex Hoffm.) Benth. et Hook. seu Angelica anomala Avé-Lall.)
- Kudzu (葛根 Gé-Gēn) root
- Magnolia (厚朴 Hòu-Pò) root bark
- Massa Fermentata (fermented mix of wheat flour, sweet annie (Artemisia annua L., 青蒿 Qīng Hāo) aerial parts, cocklebur (Xanthium sibiricum Patrin ex Widder, 蒼耳子 Cāng'r Zǐ) aerial parts, and knotweed (Polygonum aviculare L., 萹蓄 Biǎn Xù) aerial parts) (神曲 Shén Qū, Shen-Chu)
- Job's Tears (薏米 Yì-Mǐ, 薏苡仁 Yì-Yǐ Rén) seed
- Germinated Rice (Oryza sativa L.) (谷芽 Gǔ-Yá, 粟芽 Sù-Yá) seed
- Field Mint (Mentha haplocalyx Briq.) (薄荷 Bó-Hé) herb
- Chrysanthemum (菊花 Jú-Huā) flower
- Red pomelo (Citrus grandis Osbeck) (橘紅 Jú-Hóng, Chu-Hung) peel
- Halloysitum rubrum mineral (赤石脂 Chì Shí Zhī), Red Kaolin

=== Endangered species ===
Some Po Chai pills contains Saussurea costus (syn. Dolomiaea costus, Aucklandia costus, 木香), listed on the label as Radix Aucklandiae (Latin for "aucklandia root"), which is endangered in the wild and listed in CITES Appendix I. As such, CITES permits or certificates are required for international trade in the product (including if the origin of the Dolomiaea costus was artificially propagated).
