= List of kampo herbs =

Kampō (漢方) is the Japanese study and adaptation of traditional Chinese medicine. In 1967, the Ministry of Health, Labour and Welfare of Japan approved four kampō medicines for reimbursement under the National Health Insurance (NHI) program. In 1976, 82 kampō medicines were approved by the Ministry of Health, Labour and Welfare. Currently, 148 kampō medicines are approved for reimbursement.

The 14th edition of the Japanese Pharmacopoeia (日本薬局方, Nihon yakkyokuhō) lists 165 herbal ingredients that are approved to be used in kampō remedies.

Tsumura (ツムラ) is the leading maker making 128 of the 148 kampo medicines. The "count" column shows in how many of these 128 formulae the herb is found. The most common herb is Glycyrrhizae radix (Chinese licorice root). It is in 94 of the 128 Tsumura formulae. Other common herbs are ginger (51 of 128 formulae) and the root of Paeonia lactiflora (Chinese peony, 44 of 128 formulae).

Latin name	Common name in English	Japanese		Chinese			Genus species	Count (see above)
Latin name	Common name in English	Kanji	Katakana	Pinyin	T	S	Genus species	Count (see above)
Achyranthes bidentata	achyranthis root	牛膝	ゴシツ	niú xī	牛膝	牛膝	Achyranthes fauriei	3
Aconitum carmichaelii	Carmichael's monkshood rhizome	附子	ブシ	fù zǐ	附子	附子		6
Akebia quinata	chocolate vine stem	木通	モクツウ	mù tōng	木通	木通		5
Alisma orientale	water plantain rhizome	沢瀉	タクシャ	zé xiè	澤瀉	泽泻		14
Alpinia officinarum	lesser galangal rhizome	良姜	リョウキョウ	liáng jiāng	良薑	良姜		1
Amomum xanthioides	black cardamom seed	縮砂(密)	シュクシャ（み）	sùshāmì, suōshāmì	縮砂(密)	縮砂(密)		1
Anemarrhena asphodeloides	Anemarrhena rhizome	知母	チモ	zhī mǔ	知母	知母		6
Angelica dahurica	angelica root	白芷	ビャクシ	bái zhǐ	白芷	白芷	Angelica dahurica	5
Angelica acutiloba	Chinese angelica root	当帰	トウキ	dāng guī	當歸	当归		37
Aralia cordata	Japanese spikenard root	和羌活	ワキョウカツ	tǔ dāng guī	土當歸	土当归	Aralia cordata	1
Arctium lappa	greater burdock fruit	牛蒡子	ゴボウシ	niú bàng zǐ	牛蒡子	牛蒡子	Arctium lappa	2
Areca catechu	areca nut	檳榔子	ビンロウジ	bīng láng/ bīn láng	檳榔	槟榔	Areca catechu	1
Arisaema heterophyllum	Arisaema rhizome	天南星	テンナンショウ	tiān nán xīng	天南星	天南星		1
Artemisia capillaris	wormwood flower, mugwort flower	茵蔯蒿	インチンコウ	yīn chén hāo	茵陳蒿	茵陈蒿		2
Artemisia princeps	wormwood leaf, mugwort leaf	艾葉	ガイヨウ	ài yè	艾葉	艾叶		1
Asarum sieboldii	Siebold's wild ginger root	細辛	サイシン	xì xīn	細辛	细辛		5
–	collagen	阿膠	アキョウ	ē jiāo	阿膠	阿胶		5
Asparagus cochinchinensis	asparagus root	天門冬	テンモンドウ	tiān mén dōng	天門冬	天门冬		2
Astragalus mongholicus	astragalus root	黄耆	オウギ	huáng qí	黃蓍	黄芪		14
Atractylodes lancea	black A. rhizome	蒼朮	ソウジュツ	cāng zhú	蒼朮	苍术		34
Atractylodes macrocephala	white atractylodes rhizome	白朮	ビャクジュツ	bái zhú	白朮	白术		8
Citrus aurantium	unripe bitter orange	枳実	キジツ	zhǐ shí	枳實	枳实		14
Citrus unshiu	aged mikan orange peel	陳皮	チンピ	chén pí	陳皮	陈皮		24
Bambusa tuldoides	puntingpole bamboo shavings	竹筎	チクジョ	zhú rú	竹茹	竹茹		2
Benincasa cerifera	Winter melon seed	冬瓜子	トウガシ	dōng guā zǐ	冬瓜子	冬瓜子		1
–	cattle gallstone	牛黄	ゴオウ	niú huáng	牛黃	牛黄	Bos taurus	0
Bupleurum falcatum	bupleurum root	柴胡	サイコ	chái hú	柴胡	柴胡		22
Camellia sinensis	tea leaf	茶葉	チャヨウ	chá yè	茶葉	茶叶		1
Cannabis sativa	hemp fruit	麻子仁	マシニン	má zǐ rén	麻子仁	麻子仁		3
Carthamus tinctorius	safflower flower	紅花	コウカ	hóng huā	紅花	红花	Carthamus tinctorius	2
Syzygium aromaticum	clove flower	丁子	チョウジ	dīng zǐ	丁子	丁子		2
Senna obtusifolia	senna seed	決明子	ケツメイシ	jué míng zǐ	決明子	决明子		0
Chrysanthemi Flos	chrysanthemum flower	菊花	キッカ	jú huā	菊花	菊花	Chrysanthemum morifolium	1
Cryptotympana atrata	Sinokorean cicada molting	蝉退	ゼンタイ	chán tuì	蟬退	蝉退		1
Actaea simplex	bugbane rhizome, cohosh rhizome	升麻	ショウマ	shēng má	升麻	升麻		5
Cinnamomum cassia	Chinese cinnamon bark	桂皮	ケイヒ	guì pí	桂皮	桂皮		39
Clematis chinensis	clematis root	威霊仙	イレイセン	wēi líng xiān	威靈仙	威灵仙		2
Oreocome striata	Oreocome root	川芎	センキュウ	chuān xiōng	川芎	川芎	Cnidium officinale	25
Coix lacryma	Job's Tears seed	薏苡仁	ヨクイニン	yì yǐ rén	薏苡仁	薏苡仁		3
Coptis japonica	goldenthread rhizome	黄連	オウレン	huáng lián	黃連	黄连		11
Cornus officinalis	Japanese cornel fruit	山茱萸	サンシュユ	shān zhū yú	山茱萸	山茱萸	Cornus officinalis	3
Corydalis Rhizoma	corydalis rhizome	延胡索	エンゴサク	yán hú suǒ	延胡索	延胡索	Corydalis turtschaninovii	1
Crassostreae Testa	pacific oyster shell	牡蛎	ボレイ	mǔ lì	牡蠣	牡蛎	Crassostrea gigas	4
Crataegi Fructus	Japanese hawthorn fruit	山楂子	サンザシ	shān zhā	山楂	山楂	Crataegus cuneata	1
Crotonis Semen	rushfoil seed, croton seed	巴豆	ハズ	bā dòu	巴豆	巴豆	Croton tiglium	0
Cyperi Rhizoma	nut-grass rhizome	香附子	コウブシ	xiāng fù zǐ	香附子	香附子	Cyperus rotundus	6
Dioscoreae Rhizoma	Chinese yam rhizome	山薬	サンヤク	shān yào	山藥	山药	Dioscorea japonica D. opposita	4
Ephedra	ephedra herb	麻黄	マオウ	má huáng	麻黃	麻黄	Ephedra sinica	13
Eriobotryae Folium	loquat leaf	枇杷葉	ビワヨウ	pí pá yè	枇杷葉	枇杷叶	Eriobotrya japonica	1
Eucommiae Cortex	eucommia bark	杜仲	トチュウ	dù zhòng	杜仲	杜仲	Eucommia ulmoides	1
Eupolyphaga	ground beetle, wingless cockroach	庶虫(1)	シャチュウ	tǔ biē chóng	土鱉蟲	土鳖虫	Eupolyphaga sinensis	0
Fel Ursi	bear gallbladder	熊胆	ユウタン	xióng dǎn	熊膽	熊胆	Ursus arctos	0
Foeniculi Fructus	fennel fruit	茴香	ウイキョウ	huí xiāng	茴香	茴香	Foeniculum vulgare	1
Forsythiae Fructus	forsythia fruit	連翹	レンギョウ	lián qiào	連翹	连翘	Forsythia suspensa	5
Fossilia Ossis Mastodi	dragon bone, fossilized vertebrae and bones	竜骨	リュウコツ	lóng gǔ	龍骨	龙骨		2
Fritillariae Bulbus	fritillaria bulb	貝母	バイモ	bèi mǔ	貝母	贝母	Fritillaria verticillata	2
Gardeniae Fructus	gardenia fruit	山梔子	サンシシ	shān zhī zǐ	山梔子	山栀子	Gardenia jasminoides	13
Gastrodiae Rhizoma	gastrodia rhizome	天麻	テンマ	tiān má	天麻	天麻	Gastrodia elata	1
Gentianae Scabrae Radix	Chinese gentian root	竜胆	リュウタン	lóng dǎn caǒ	龍膽草	龙胆草	Gentiana scabra	3
Glehniae Radix Cum Rhizoma	glehnia rhizome	浜防風	ハマボウフウ	běi shā shēn	北沙參	北沙参	Glehnia littoralis	1
Glycyrrhizae Radix	Chinese liquorice root	甘草	カンゾウ	gān cǎo	甘草	甘草	Glycyrrhiza uralensis	94
Glycyrrhizae Radix preparata	Chinese liquorice root	炙甘草	シャカンゾウ	zhì gān cǎo	炙甘草	炙甘草	Glycyrrhiza uralensis	1
Gypsum Fibrosum	gypsum mineral	石膏	セッコウ	shí gāo	石膏	石膏		10
Hordei Fructus Germinatus	barley sprout	麦芽	バクガ	mài yá	麥芽	麦芽	Hordeum vulgare	1
Houttuyniae Herba	houttuynia herb	十薬	ジュウヤク	shí yào	十藥	十药	Houttuynia cordata	0
Leonuri Herba	Chinese motherwort herb	益母草	ヤクモソウ	yì mǔ cǎo	益母草	益母草	Leonurus japonicus	0
Lilii Bulbus	tiger lily bulb	百合	ビャクゴウ	bǎi hé	百合	百合	Lilium lancifolium	1
Linderae Radix	spicebush root, benjamin bush root	烏薬	ウヤク	wū yào	烏樂	乌乐	Lindera strychnifolia	0
Lithospermi Radix	lithospermum root	紫根	シコン	zǐ gēn	紫根	紫根	Lithospermum erythrorhizon	0
Longan Arillus	longan fruit flesh	竜眼肉	リュウガンニク	lóng yǎn ròu	龍眼肉	龙眼肉	Euphoria longana	2
Lonicerae Folium Cum Caulis	Japanese honeysuckle stem	忍冬	ニンドウ	rěn dōng téng	忍冬藤	忍冬疼	Lonicera japonica	1
Lycii Cortex	wolfberry tree bark	地骨皮	ジコッピ	dì gǔ pí	地骨皮	地骨皮	Lycium chinense	2
Lycii Fructus	wolfberry tree fruit	枸杞子	クコシ	gǒu qǐ zǐ	枸杞子	枸杞子	Lycium chinense	0
Magnoliae Cortex	houpu magnolia bark	厚朴	コウボク	hòu pò	厚朴	厚朴	Magnolia officinalis	12
Magnoliae Flos	willow-leafed magnolia flower	辛夷	シンイ	xīn yí	辛夷	辛夷	Magnolia salicifolia	2
Menthae Herba	wild mint herb	薄荷	ハッカ	bò hé	薄荷	薄荷	Mentha arvensis	7
Mori Cortex	white mulberry bark	桑白皮	ソウハクヒ	sāng bái pí	桑白皮	桑白皮	Morus alba	2
Natrii Sulfus	sodium sulfate	芒硝	ボウショウ	máng xiāo	芒硝	芒硝		6
Nelumbis Semen	sacred lotus seed	蓮肉	レンニク	lián ròu	蓮肉	莲肉	Nelumbo nucifera	2
Notopterygii Rhizoma	notopterygium rhizome	羌活	キョウカツ	qiāng huó	羌活	羌活	Notopterygium incisum	3
Nupharis Rhizoma	Japanese water lily rhizome	川骨	センコツ	chuān gǔ	川骨	川骨	Nuphar japonicum	1
Ophiopogonis Rhizoma	mondo grass rhizome	麦門冬	バクモンドウ	mài mén dōng	麥門冬	麦门冬	Ophiopogon japonicus	11
Oryzae Semen	rice seed	粳米	コウベイ	jīng mǐ	粳米	粳米	Oryza sativa	2
Paeoniae Moutan Cortex	tree peony bark	牡丹皮	ボタンピ	mǔ dān pí	牡丹皮	牡丹皮	Paeonia moutan	8
Paeoniae Radix	Chinese peony root	芍薬	シャクヤク	sháo yào	芍藥	芍药	Paeonia lactiflora	44
Panacis Ginseng Radix	ginseng root	人参	ニンジン	rén shēn	人參	人参	Panax ginseng	37
Panacis Japonicus	Japanese ginseng root	竹節人参	チクセツニンジン	zhú jié rén shēn	竹節人參	竹节人参	Panax japonicus	0
Perillae Herba	shiso herb, beefsteak plant	蘇葉	ソヨウ	sū yè	蘇葉	苏叶	Perilla frutescens	6
Persicae Semen	peach kernel	桃仁	トウニン	táo rén	桃仁	桃仁	Prunus persica	6
Peucedani Radix	peucedanum root	前胡	ゼンコ	qián hú	前胡	前胡	Peucedanum praeruptorum	1
Phellodendri Cortex	cork-tree bark	黄柏	オウバク	huáng bǎi	黃柏	黄柏	Phellodendron amurense	8
Pinelliae Rhizoma	pinellia rhizome	半夏	ハンゲ	bàn xià	半夏	半夏	Pinellia ternata	27
Plantaginis Semen	Chinese plantain seed	車前子	シャゼンシ	chē qián zǐ	車前子	车前子	Plantago asiatica	4
Platycodi Radix	Chinese bellflower root, balloon flower root	桔梗	キキョウ	jié gěng	桔梗	桔梗	Platycodon grandiflorus	12
Polygalae Radix	milkwort root, snakeroot	遠志	オンジ	yuǎn zhì	遠志	远志	Polygala tenuifolia	3
Polygoni Multiflori Radix	Chinese knotweed root	何首烏	カシュウ	hé shǒu wū	何首烏	何首乌	Reynoutria multiflora	1
Polyporus	polyporus mushroom	猪苓	チョレイ	zhū líng	豬苓	猪苓	Polyporus umbellatus	6
Poria	tuckahoe mushroom	茯苓	ブクリョウ	fú líng	茯苓	茯苓	Poria cocos	46
Prunus armeniaca	apricot kernel	杏仁	キョウニン	xìng rén	杏仁	杏仁	Prunus armeniaca	9
Puerariae Radix	kudzu root	葛根	カッコン	gé gēn	葛根	葛根	Pueraria lobata	4
Quercus Cortex	sawtooth oak bark	樸樕	ボクソク	xiàng shí	橡實	橡实	Quercus acutissima	2
Rehmanniae Radix	Chinese foxglove root	地黄	ジオウ	dì huáng	地黃	地黄	Rehmannia glutinosa	22
Rhei Rhizoma	turkey rhubarb rhizome	大黄	ダイオウ	dà huáng	大黃	大黄	Rheum palmatum	16
Saccharum Granorum	ground sugar	膠飴	コウイ	jiāo yí	膠飴	胶饴		0
Saposhnikoviae Radix	saposhnikovia root	防風	ボウフウ	fáng fēng	防風	防风	Saposhnikovia divaricata	11
Sappan Lignum	sappan wood shavings	蘇木	ソボク	sū mù	蘇木	苏木	Caesalpinia sappan	1
Saussureae Radix	saw-wort root, snow lotus root	木香	モッコウ	mù xiāng	木香	木香	Saussurea lappa	3
Schisandrae Fructus	schisandra fruit	五味子	ゴミシ	wǔ wèi zǐ	五味子	五味子	Schisandra chinensis	5
Schizonepetae Spica	schizonepeta spikes	荊芥	ケイガイ	jīng jìe	荊芥	荆芥	Schizonepeta tenuifolia	8
Scutellariae Radix	skullcap root	黄芩	オウゴン	huáng qín	黃芩	黄芩	Scutellaria baicalensis	27
Sesami Semen	sesame seed	胡麻	ゴマ	hú má	胡麻	胡麻	Sesamum indicum	1
Sinomeni Caulis et Rhizoma	orient vine rhizome	防已	ボウイ	qīng fēng téng	青風藤	青风藤	Sinomenium acutum	3
Sophorae Radix	sophora root	苦参	クジン	kǔ shēn	苦參	苦参	Sophora flavescens	2
Swertiae Herba	swertia herb	当薬	トウヤク	dāng yào	當藥	当药	Swertia japonica	0
Talcum Crystallinum (Kadinum)	talcum powder	滑石	カッセキ	huá shí	滑石	滑石		4
Tetradii Fructus	evodia fruit	呉茱萸	ゴシュユ	wú zhū yú	吳茱萸	吴茱萸	Tetradium rutaecarpa	3
Tribuli Fructus	puncture vine fruit	蒺藜子(2)	シツリシ	jí lí zǐ	蒺藜子	蒺藜子	Tribulus terrestris	1
Trichosanthis Radix	trichosanthes root	栝楼根	カロコン	guā lóu gēn	瓜蔞根	瓜蒌根	Trichosanthes kirilowii	2
Trichosanthes kirilowii	trichosanthes seed	栝楼仁	カロニン	guā lóu rén	栝蔞仁	栝蒌仁		1
Triticum aestivum	common wheat seed	小麦	ショウバク	xiǎo mài	小麥	小麦		1
Uncaria gambir	gambier extract	阿仙薬	アセンヤク	ā xiān yào	阿仙藥	阿仙药		0
Uncaria rhynchophylla	gambier extract	釣藤鈎	チョウトウコウ	diào gōu téng	釣鉤藤	钓钩藤		4
Zanthoxylum piperitum	Japanese pepper tree fruit	山椒	サンショウ	shān jiāo	山椒	山椒		2
Zingiberis officinale	fresh ginger rhizome	生姜	ショウキョウ	shēng jiāng	生薑	生姜	Zingiber officinale	51
Zingiber officinale	dried ginger rhizome	乾姜	カンキョウ	gān jiāng	乾薑	干姜	Zingiber officinale	12
Ziziphus zizyphus	jujube fruit, Chinese date	大棗	タイソウ	dà zǎo	大棗	大枣		39
Ziziphus zizyphus	jujube seed, Chinese date seed	酸棗仁	サンソウニン	suān zǎo rén	酸棗仁	酸枣仁	Ziziphus zizyphus	3

- Note 1: this character cannot be displayed correctly on a computer. "庶" is usually substituted in Chinese and Japanese. The "灬" in "庶" should be replaced with "虫".
- Note 2: this character cannot be displayed correctly on a computer. "梨" is usually substituted in Chinese. "梨" or "藜" is usually substituted in Japanese. The "勿" in "藜" should be replaced with "刂".

== See also ==
- Kampo list
- Chinese classic herbal formula
- List of plants used in herbalism
- Pharmacopoeia
