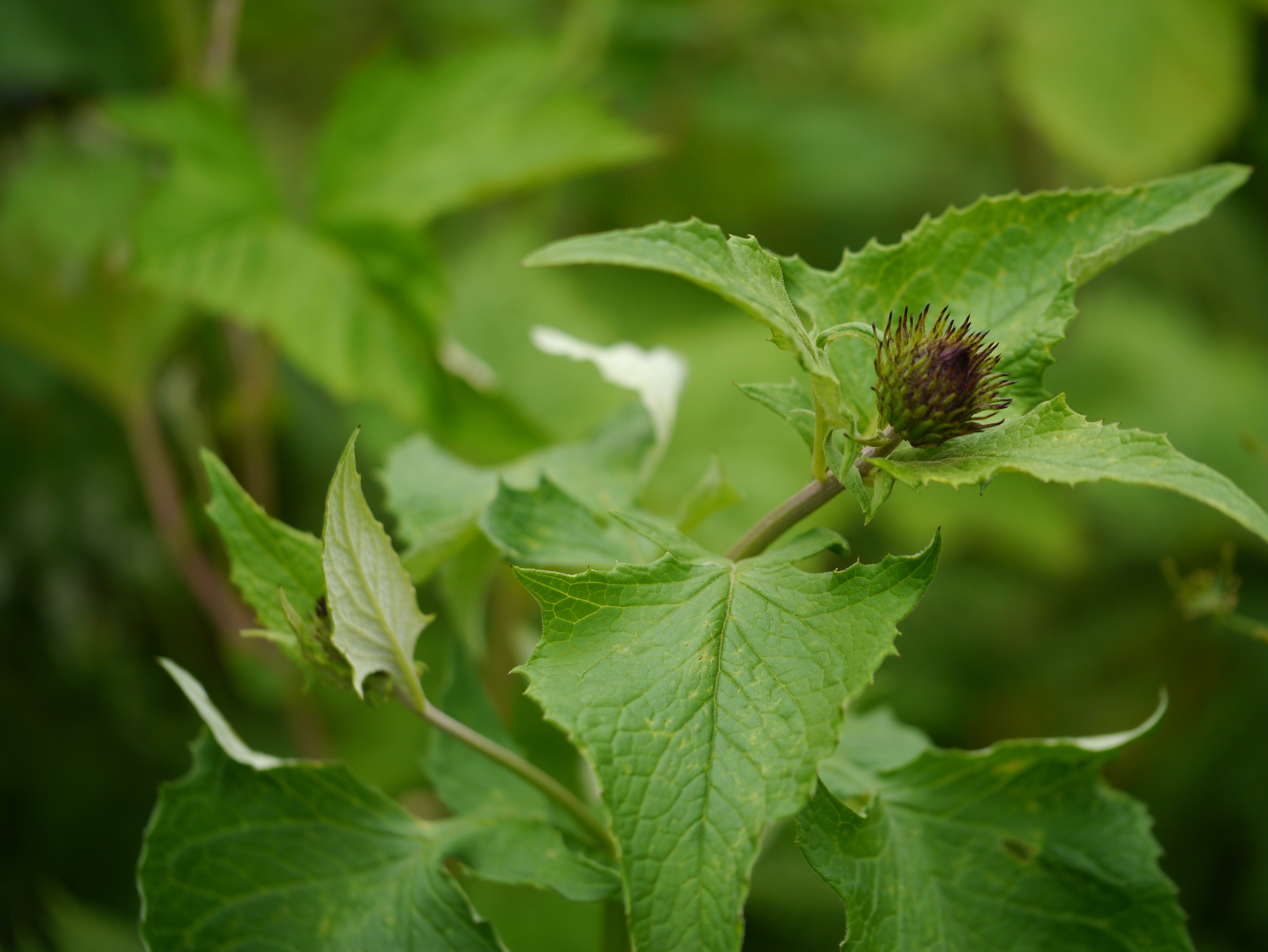
- CITES Appendix I

Scientific classification
- Kingdom: Plantae
- Clade: Embryophytes
- Clade: Tracheophytes
- Clade: Spermatophytes
- Clade: Angiosperms
- Clade: Eudicots
- Clade: Asterids
- Order: Asterales
- Family: Asteraceae
- Genus: Dolomiaea
- Species: D. costus

Binomial name
- Dolomiaea costus (Falc.) Kasana & A.K.Pandey

Synonyms
- Aplotaxis lappa Decne.; Aucklandia costus Falc.; Aucklandia lappa (Decne.) Decne.; Saussurea costus (Falc.) Lipsch.; Saussurea lappa (Decne.) Sch.Bip.; Theodorea costus (Falc.) Kuntze

= Dolomiaea costus =

Species of plant

Dolomiaea costus, formerly known as Saussurea costus, commonly known as costus, Indian costus, kuth, or putchuk, is a species of thistle in the genus Dolomiaea native to South Asia and China. Rishi (Hindu) mystics of Kashmir especially ate this plant. Essential oils extracted from the root have been used in traditional medicine and in perfumes since ancient times.

Costus is the root of this plant. The root of the plant is the key part used for medicinal or homeopathic purposes. The root is also called by its Latin name radix aucklandiae (root of Aucklandia).

It has a large number of names in other languages, including kuṣṭha in Sanskrit; kust or qust in Arabic and Persian; kut, kur, and pachak in Hindi and Bengali, kostum, gostham, and potchuk in Tamil; upaleta and kur in Gujarati; kot or kust in Punjabi; changala in Telugu; sepuddy in Malayalam; kostha in Kannada; kuth or postkhai in Kashmiri; and kosht (קשט) in Hebrew; koto in Swahili; mu xiang in Chinese.

== Description ==
Dolomiaea costus is a perennial plant with a typical growth of 1–2 m (3.3–6.6 ft) tall and 1 m (3.3 ft) wide. It has long lyrate leaves and heads of purple florets. The leaves take the shape of being auricled at base, with jagged, toothed patterns running down the sides of the leaves and are an average of 0.50–1.25 m (1.6–4.1 ft) long. The roots of the plant are stout and can travel up to 40 cm (16 in) in length.

== Habitat ==
It is usually found at elevations of 2,500 to 3,000 m (8,200 to 9,800 ft) asl in India; including the Himalayas, Kashmir, Jammu, Western Ghats, and the Kishenganga Valley. Its typical flowering season spans from July to August, with the seeds ripening from August to September. The plant can be grown in a wide variety of soils, ranging from light sandy, medium to heavy clay soils that are acid, neutral or basic, alkaline soils, preferring soils that are moist. The amount of sunlight the plant thrives upon can vary from semi-shaded (light woodland) areas or areas with no shade.

== Cultivation ==
The plant is cultivated as a medicinal plant. Its growing region occurs mainly within India-Himachal Pradesh, Jammu-Kashmir- its native place of origin. A study by Parmaret. al. 2012 explored the effect of altitude on seed germination and survival percentage, proving that high altitudes favoured high survival and seed germination percentages. This is why they thrive so abundantly in the Himalayan Region which is very mountainous. Cultivation is primarily focused upon the roots of the plants. Most of the roots are exported to China and Japan and as they serve as a big commodity for commerce in Kashmir. However, this type of trade is now being controlled by the state due to it being over-exploited. This plant has been greatly over-collected and has been placed on Appendix I of CITES.

== Uses ==
=== Spice ===
As a spice, Pliny described it as having a "burning taste and an exquisite scent", but being "otherwise useless".

=== Ancient Judaism ===
The root of Dolomiaea costus is mentioned in rabbinical writings as kosht (Hebrew: קשט), reflecting its arrowhead shape. It was used in the ketoret, the consecrated incense described in the Hebrew Bible and Talmud. It was offered on a specialized incense altar in the Tabernacle, and in the First and Second Jerusalem Temples. The Ketoret was an important component of the Temple service in Jerusalem.

=== Ancient Rome ===
Known in Greek as kostos or kostarin and in Latin as costum, it was used as a spice in classical Rome and Byzantinium, when it was used to flavor wine.

=== Britain ===
Costus was used as a spice in medieval England, for example as an ingredient in a greensauce described by Alexander Neckam in the 12th century.

=== Islam ===
It was recommended by Prophet Muhammad in "Sahih hadith". "Treat with the Indian incense, for it has healing for seven diseases; it is to be sniffed by one having throat trouble, and to be put into one side of the mouth of one suffering from pleurisy.".

=== China ===
In traditional Chinese medicine, the root is one of the 50 fundamental herbs. It has the name (Chinese: 云木香; pinyin: yún mù xiāng, meaning "wood aroma"). It is found in the popular digestive remedy Po Chai pills and is also used as incense.

=== India ===
In Ayurveda, the name kushta refers to an ancient Vedic plant god mentioned in the Atharvaveda as a remedy for takman, the archetypal disease of excess or jvara (fever). In ancient India, kushta was considered to be a divine plant derived from heavenly sources, growing high in the Himalayas, considered to be the brother of the divine Soma. In Ayurveda, kushta is a rasayana for Vata, considered to normalize and strengthen digestion, cleanse the body of toxic accumulations, enhance fertility, and reduce pain. Its dried powder is the principal ingredient in an ointment for ulcers; it is also a hair wash.

Costus rhizome is used for curing woolen cloth in hill area of Uttarakhand.

=== Other common uses ===
An essential oil obtained from the roots is used in perfumery, incenses, and in hair rinses. It has a strong lingering scent that has the scent of violets at first, yet changes to a more unpleasant goat-like smell as it ages. The common form of the roots can be either found as an essential oil, a ground powder, or as a dried stick. Another use for the plant is within incense sticks. These sticks can be created from these roots by grinding the roots into a powder and then forming the stick structure. As well, the dried sticks are commonly found cut up into thin slices to be used as lightings for shrines or as tonics for hot baths.

== Trade ==
The species was determined "readily available" in the markets of Calcutta, Delhi, Mumbai, Amritsar, and Haridwar by a survey conducted by TRAFFIC India in 1997 and is considered one of the most common medicinal plants traded in Delhi. S. costus is so readily available and abundant that very large quantities can be procured on demand within markets and stores with their main customers being large and small pharmaceutical companies. According to CITES trade data, China and India are the main exporters of the product itself with Hong Kong following close behind as a noted re-exporter. China was the first documented trader of S. costus, with trade records dating back to 1981 and 1982. S. costus is the only Appendix I species which is significantly traded internationally for medicinal purposes. The species was included in Appendix II as early as 1975 and increased list placement in Appendix I with effect.

== Plant endangerment ==
S. costus is one of the most threatened medicinal plants of Kashmir Himalaya. This species is threatened due to the unregulated collection, over-exploitation, illegal trade, and loss of habitat. Habitat loss continues due to road construction and military establishments in many of the cultivation areas, decreasing its yield globally. Habitat destruction in the form of recreational activities and urbanization is as well limiting its ability to be cultivated, again decreasing global yield of this product. Another influence heavily affecting the survival rate of this species is the uncontrolled grazing of yak. The biggest threat, however, comes from the usage of the plant for its medicinal properties. It is listed as "endangered" by the Red data book of Indian plants. In another study, a camp workshop held in Lucknow assessed the plant as "Critically Endangered new" nationally in India, holding a population decline of 70% in the last 10 years. Another CAMP workshop for northern India assessed it as "Critically Endangered new" in the state of Jammu and Kashmir. Conservation efforts do exist to control the rate of depletion of the species. The legislations of Jammu and Kashmir have enforced a special Act, The Kuth Act, in 1978 for the regulation of trade of S. costus.

== See also ==
- List of lyrate plants
