= Sho-saiko-to =

Herbal supplement

Shō-saiko-tō (小柴胡湯) (SST), also known as minor bupuleurum formula and xiǎocháihútāng (XCHT) (Chinese: 小柴胡湯), is a Chinese classic herbal formula. It is treated as a herbal supplement in the west, but is widely prescribed in China and is one of the standard Kampo formulas in Japan. There are currently ongoing clinical trials for SST at University of California, San Diego and Memorial Sloan-Kettering Cancer Center. The active ingredients of SST discovered so far include baicalin, baicalein, glycyrrhizin, saikosaponins, ginsenosides, wogonin, and gingerol.

As an over-the-counter Chinese patent medicine it is listed in the Pharmacopoeia of the People's Republic of China. One dried, soluble form lists chai-hu/saiko (dried Bupleurum chinense or scorzonerifolium root), huangqin (dry Scutellaria baicalensis stem), banxia (Pinellia ternata), ginger, licorice, jujube, and Codonopsis pilosula as ingredients. This form is standardized to contain at least 20 mg baicalin per serving. Some formulae use ginseng instead of C. pilosula.

It is first recorded in Shanghan Lun c. 220 AD, indicated for illness in the "lesser yang" meridian. It has some antidepressant-like effects.

Sho-saiko-to has been studied extensively in patients with hepatitis B, but the quality of studies were very low. Key indicators such as mortality, morbidity, and serious adverse events are rarely reported. Many studies do not even have their design and conduct stated clearly.
