= Mao-to =

Traditional Japanese herbal medicine

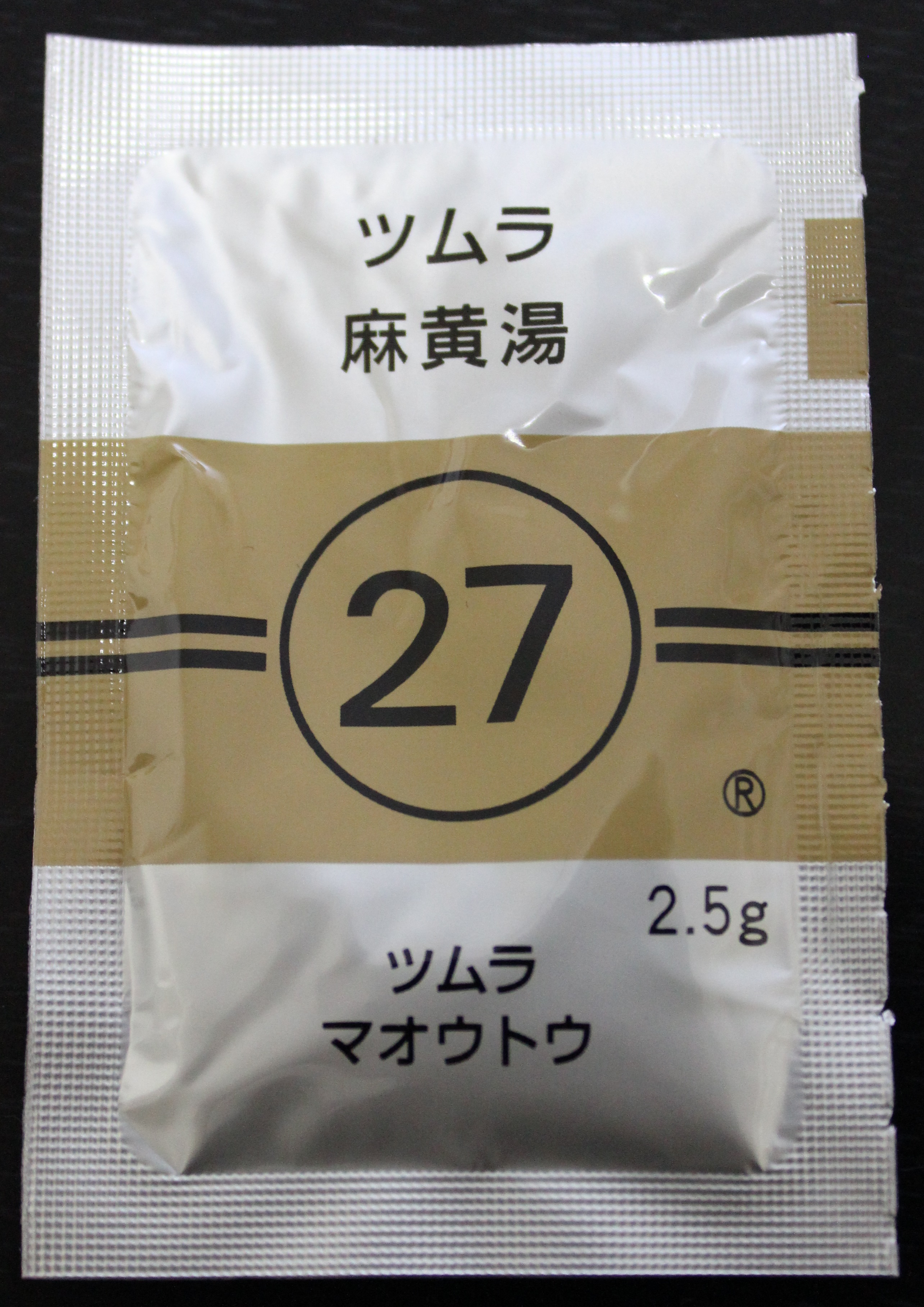
A commercial extract of mao-to, sold as Tsumura No. 27.

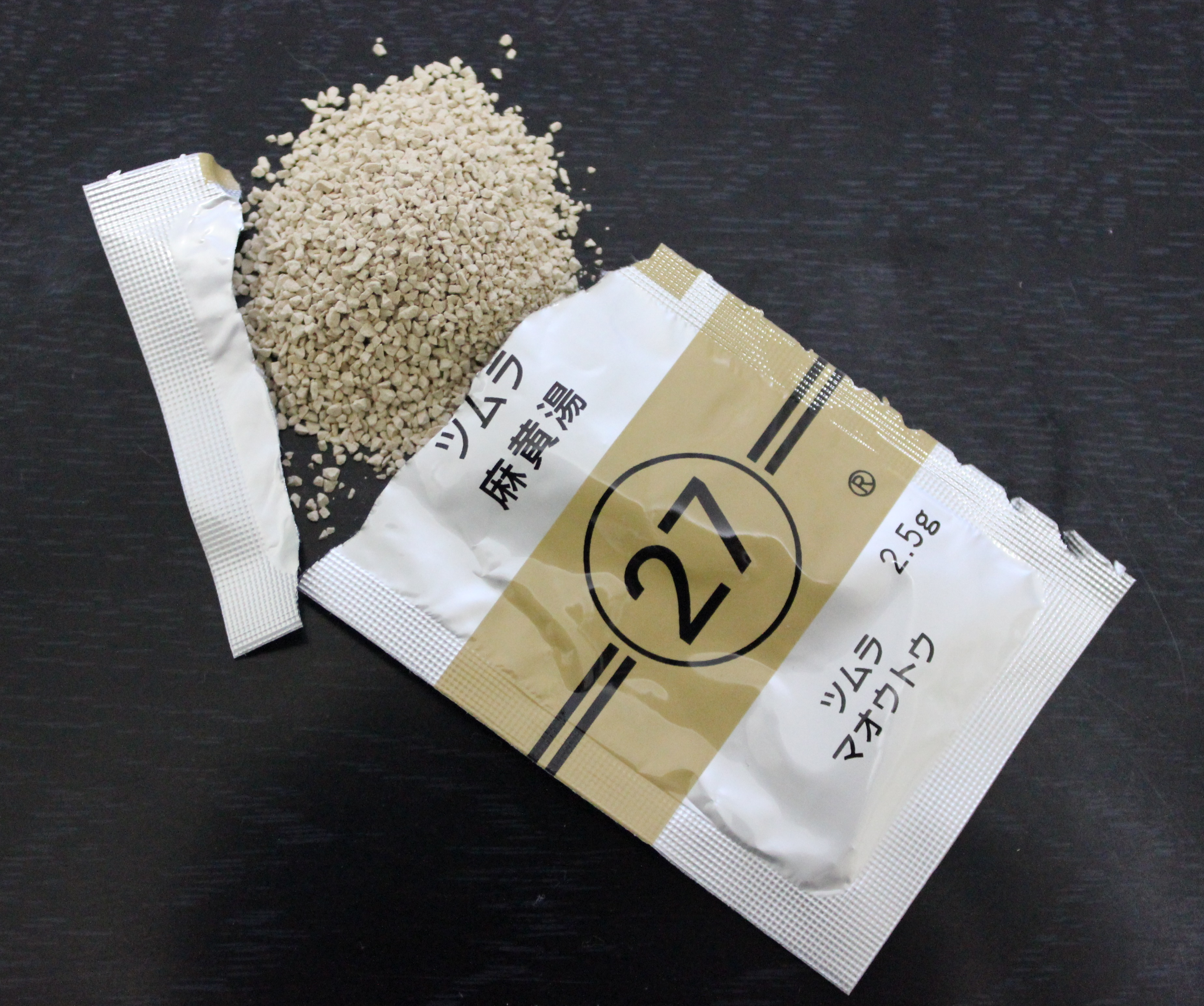
Open extract of Tsumura No. 27; the granules are shown.

Mao-to (Japanese: まおうとう, Hepburn: Maō-tō) is a traditional Japanese herbal formula used in Kampo medicine. It originates in ancient China derived from the medicine mahuang tang. It is primarily prescribed for the treatment of upper respiratory tract infections and influenza, and has been included in Japan's national health insurance system for over four decades. Mao-to consists of four herbal ingredients—the stem of Chinese ephedra, the kernel of an apricot species, the bark of Chinese cassia and licorice root—and is typically prepared as a hot-water extract.

Pharmacological studies have shown that its components possess antiviral properties, particularly against influenza A virus, through mechanisms that inhibit viral entry and modulate immune responses. Mao-to is widely used in Japan both as a prescription and over-the-counter medication, and clinical research supports its effectiveness in reducing influenza symptoms with minimal side effects. Its safety profile is generally favorable, though caution is recommended for individuals with certain preexisting health conditions.

== History ==
The formula now known in Japanese as mao-to (Japanese: まおうとう, Hepburn: Maō-tō) originates from classical Chinese medicine, where it is referred to as mahuang tang. It was first recorded in the ancient Chinese medical textbook Shanghan Lun (Chinese: 伤寒论; pinyin: Shānghán Lùn), compiled by Zhang Zhongjing during the Eastern Han dynasty (c. 25–220 AD). This text remains one of the foundational works of traditional Chinese medicine (TCM), and mao-to was included as a key formula for treating externally contracted febrile diseases.

Traditionally, mao-to was used to alleviate early-stage symptoms of acute febrile illnesses, particularly those characterized by fever, headache, and cough in the absence of sweating. It was typically prepared as a hot-water extract and administered orally. The formula aimed to release the exterior by inducing perspiration and expelling pathogens from the surface layer of the body. It is typically less expensive than neuraminidase inhibitors (NAIs), which are also used to treat influenza.

Mao-to was later incorporated into Kampo, the Japanese adaptation of traditional Chinese medicine. In modern Japan, mao-to is among the most frequently prescribed Kampo medicines. It has been formally integrated into the national healthcare system and has been covered by Japan's public health insurance for over four decades and is also available as an over-the-counter drug. Pharmaceutical production of mao-to extracts in Japan follows Good Manufacturing Practice (GMP) standards, with standardized extraction processes and strict quality controls defined by the Japanese Pharmacopoeia.

== Composition ==
Mao-to consists of four main herbal ingredients in standardized ratios:

- Ephedrae herba (Note: The ingredients listed are the standardized pharmacopoeial names used in Japanese and Chinese medicine. They are not botanical species name. The corresponding botanical sources are as follows: Ephedrae Herba refers to the stem of Ephedra sinica; Armeniacae semen is the kernel of Prunus armeniaca; Cinnamomi cortex is the bark of Cinnamomum cassia; and Glycyrrhizae radix is the root of Glycyrrhiza uralensis.) (Ephedra) – 32.3%
- Armeniacae semen (Apricot kernel) – 32.3%
- Cinnamomi cortex (Cinnamon bark) – 25.8%
- Glycyrrhizae radix (Licorice root) – 9.6%

Identified active compounds associated with its pharmacological effects include ephedrine, glycyrrhizin (which metabolizes to glycyrrhetinic acid), and amygdalin. Additional constituents identified in plasma following administration include pseudoephedrine, methylephedrine, prunasin, liquiritigenin, and isoliquiritigenin.

Advanced metabolomics studies using liquid chromatography–mass spectrometry have identified key compounds absorbed into the bloodstream, including ephedrine, prunasin, cinnamic acid, and glycyrrhetinic acid. Notably, about 80% of the mao-to-related compounds found in human plasma are metabolites formed in the body, rather than the original plant constituents. These converted forms are often difficult to detect using standard chemical databases and require strategies like DAC-Met (Differential Annotation of Converted Metabolites) for identification.

== Traditional uses ==
Traditionally, mao-to has been employed to treat febrile illnesses and symptoms such as fever, headache, cough, and myalgia, particularly in the absence of sweating. It has also been used for conditions including bronchial asthma, rheumatoid arthritis, infant nasal congestion, and difficulty nursing. In contemporary Japanese clinical practice, mao-to is frequently used to manage early-stage influenza. It has been administered alone or alongside neuraminidase inhibitors (NAIs) in both outpatient and inpatient settings. Studies by Evidence-Based Complementary and Alternative Medicine have indicated that mao-to may reduce the duration of fever and alleviate other influenza-related symptoms. For instance, a randomized controlled trial demonstrated that mao-to's antipyretic effects were comparable to those of NAIs like oseltamivir and zanamivir.

== Mechanism of action ==
A primary mechanism of mao-to is involving inhibition of viral entry and replication. Studies have shown that mao-to, particularly its components Ephedra herba and Cinnamomi cortex, suppresses the growth of influenza A virus by targeting early stages of infection. It disrupts the acidification of endosomes by inhibiting the activity of vacuolar-type H⁺-ATPase (V-ATPase), a proton pump essential for viral uncoating. This raises the endosomal pH, preventing the release of RNA virus into the host cell cytoplasm. As a result, virus particles accumulate in endosomes, and the expression of viral proteins such as matrix protein 2 (M2) and nucleoprotein is reduced. Additionally, cinnamaldehyde from Cinnamomi cortex may inhibit influenza protein synthesis at a post-transcriptional level.

Beyond its direct antiviral action, mao-to modulates the host immune and inflammatory responses. It has been shown to increase levels of anti-influenza antibodies (IgM, IgA, and IgG) in mucosal and systemic fluids, likely enhancing both specific and non-specific immunity. mao-to also alters the host lipid and amino acid profiles, notably increasing anti-inflammatory omega-3 fatty acids like EPA and DHA, while decreasing branched-chain amino acids. It upregulates macrophage- and T cell-related gene expression and may contribute to symptom relief—such as reducing fever, headache, and myalgia—by modulating cytokines including IL-6 and IL-1 receptor antagonist, and suppressing prostaglandin E2 production.

In addition to its application against influenza, mao-to has demonstrated antiviral activity against hepatitis B virus (HBV) in experimental models. Unlike its mechanism in influenza, mao-to appears to interfere with HBV nucleocapsid incorporation into viral particles, potentially through downregulation of the host gene TPM2. The multi-component nature of mao-to, which includes ingredients like Glycyrrhizae radix and Cinnamomi cortex, also results in the formation of bioactive metabolites in immune cells such as macrophages.

== Administration ==
Mao-to is administered orally, most commonly in the form of a granulated or powdered as a hot-water extract. In Japan, it is widely used both as a prescription Kampo medicine and as an over-the-counter drug (OTC), though the OTC version typically contains half the concentration of active ingredients compared to the prescribed form.

The standard adult dosage in Japan is 7.5 grams per day for granules or 6.0 grams per day for powder, usually divided into two or three doses. In pediatric patients, a commonly used regimen for the powdered form is 0.06 grams per kilogram of body weight per dose, taken three times daily. Clinical studies have supported the use of mao-to at these dosages, showing effectiveness in symptom relief and viral suppression, with minimal adverse effects. One clinical metabolomics study, for example, administered a single oral dose of 7.5 grams to healthy adults to assess its systemic impact.

=== Safety ===
Clinical trials and observational studies report that mao-to is generally well tolerated, with few or mild side effects. However, caution is advised due to the presence of Ephedrae herba, which may pose risks to individuals with cardiovascular, thyroid, or prostate conditions. Glycyrrhizae radix, another component, contains 18β-glycyrrhetyl-3-O-sulfate, which may contribute to hypokalemia in rare cases. Experts recommend avoiding long-term use due to the potential for enhancing non-specific antibody responses, including autoantibodies.
