= Kampo list =

Kampō (or Kanpō, 漢方) medicine is the Japanese study and adaptation of Traditional Chinese medicine. Today in Japan, kampo is integrated into the national health care system. In 1967, the Ministry of Health, Labour and Welfare approved 4 kampo medicines for reimbursement under the National Health Insurance (NHI) program. In 1976, 82 kampo medicines were approved by the Ministry of Health, Labour and Welfare. Currently, 148 kampo medicines are approved for reimbursement.

Rather than modifying formulas as in Traditional Chinese medicine, the Japanese kampo tradition uses fixed combinations of herbs in standardized proportions according to the classical literature of Chinese medicine. kampo medicines are produced by various manufacturers. However, each medicine is composed of exactly the same ingredients under the ministry's standardization methodology. The medicines are therefore prepared under strict manufacturing conditions that rival pharmaceutical companies.

Extensive modern scientific research in Japan has validated the effectiveness of kampo medicines. In October, 2000 a nationwide study was carried out that reported that 72% of registered physicians prescribe kampo medicines . The two leading companies making kampo medicines are Tsumura (ツムラ) and Kracie (クラシエ) the former name Kanebō (カネボウ) .

The following list are the kampo medicines produced by Tsumura. Many kampo medicines were borrowed from China. The Chinese name for the formula the kampo medicine is based on is listed below. However, the formula usually doesn't completely match the original Chinese formula. Often the proportions of the herbs were changed slightly. Also some Chinese species of herbs were replaced with herbs found in Japan.

Romaji	Kanji	Hiragana	Kampo #	Pinyin	Chinese (S)
Anchū-san	安中散	あんちゅうさん	5		
Bakumondō-tō	麦門冬湯	ばくもんどうとう	29		麦门冬汤
Bōfū-tsūshō-san	防風通聖散	ぼうふうつうしょうさん	62	fáng fēng tōng shèng wán	防風通圣丸
Bōi-ōgi-tō	防已黄耆湯	ぼういおうぎとう	20	fáng jǐ huáng qí wán	防己黃耆丸
Bukuryō-in	茯苓飲	ぶくりょういん	69		
Bukuryō-in-gō-hange-kōboku-tō	茯苓飲合半夏厚朴湯	ぶくりょういんごうはんげこうぼくとう	116		
Byakko-ka-ninjin-tō	白虎加人参湯	びゃっこかにんじんとう	34	bái hǔ tāng wán	白虎加人参汤
Chikujo-untan-tō	竹じょ温胆湯	ちくじょうんたんとう	91		竹茹温胆汤
Chōi-jōki-tō	調胃承気湯	ちょういじょうきとう	74		调味承气汤
Chorei-tō	猪苓湯	ちょれいとう	40		猪苓汤
Chorei-tō-gō-shimotsu-tō	猪苓湯合四物湯	ちょれいとうごうしもつとう	112		猪苓汤和四物汤
Chōtō-san	釣藤散	ちょうとうさん	47		
Dai-bōfū-tō	大防風湯	だいぼうふうとう	97		
Dai-jōki-tō	大承気湯	だいじょうきとう	133		大承气汤
Dai-kenchū-tō	大建中湯	だいけんちゅうとう	100		大建中汤
Daiō-botanpi-tō	大黄牡丹皮湯	だいおうぼたんぴとう	33		大黄牡丹皮汤
Daiō-kanzō-tō	大黄甘草湯	だいおうかんぞうとう	84		
Dai-saiko-tō	大柴胡湯	だいさいことう	8	dà chái hú wán	大柴胡丸
Eppi-ka-jutsu-tō	越婢加朮湯	えっぴかじゅつとう	28		越婢加术汤
Goko-tō	五虎湯	ごことう	95		
Gorei-san	五苓散	ごれいさん	17	wǔ líng sǎn wán	五苓散
Gorin-san	五淋散	ごりんさん	56		五淋散
Goshaku-san	五積散	ごしゃくさん	63		
Gosha-jinki-gan	牛車腎気丸	ごしゃじんきがん	107		
Goshūyu-tō	呉茱萸湯	ごしゅうとう	31		吴茱萸汤
Hachimi-jiō-gan	八味地黄丸	はちみじおうがん	7	bāwèi dìhuáng wán	八味地黄丸
Hainō-san-kyū-tō	排膿散及湯	はいのうさんきゅうとう	122		
Hange-byakujutsu-tenma-tō	半夏白朮天麻湯	はんげびゃくじゅつてんまとう	37		
Hange-kōboku-tō	半夏厚朴湯	はんげこうぼくとう	16	bàn xià hòu pō wán	半夏厚樸丸
Hange-shashin-tō	半夏瀉心湯	はんげしゃしんとう	14		半夏泻心汤
Heii-san	平胃散	へいいさん	79	píng wèi sǎn wán	平胃散丸
Hochū-ekki-tō	補中益気湯	ほちゅうえっきとう	41	bǔ zhōng yì qì wán	补中益气丸
Inchin-gorei-san	茵ちん五苓散	いんちんごれいさん	117	yīnchén wǔlíng sǎn	茵陈五苓散
Inchinkō-tō	茵ちん蒿湯	いんちんこうとう	135		茵陈蒿汤
Irei-tō	胃苓湯	いれいとう	115		胃苓汤
Ji-daboku-ippō	治打撲一方	ぢだぼくいっぽう	89		
Jiin-kōka-tō	滋陰降火湯	じいんこうかとう	93		滋阴降火汤
Jiin-shihō-tō	滋陰至宝湯	じいんしほうとう	92		
Jinso-in	参蘇飲	じんそいん	66		参苏饮
Ji-zusō-ippō	治頭瘡一方	ぢずそういっぽう	59		
Junchō-tō	潤腸湯	じゅんちょうとう	51		润肠汤
Jūmi-haidoku-tō	十味敗毒湯	じゅうみはいどくとう	6		
Jūzen-daiho-tō	十全大補湯	じゅうぜんだいほとう	48	shí quán dà bǔ wán	十全大补丸
Kakkon-tō	葛根湯	かっこんとう	1		葛根汤
Kakkon-tō-ka-senkyū-shin'i	葛根湯加川きゅう辛夷	かっこんとうかせんきゅうしんい	2		
Kami-kihi-tō	加味帰脾湯	かみきひとう	137		加味归脾汤
Kami-shōyō-san	加味逍遙散	かみしょうようさん	24	jiā wèi xiāo yáo wán	加味逍遙丸
Kan-baku-daisō-tō	甘麦大棗湯	かんばくだいそうとう	72	gān mài dà zǎo wán	甘麥大棗丸
Keigai-rengyō-tō	荊芥連翹湯	けいがいれんぎょうとう	50		
Keihi-tō	啓脾湯	けいひとう	128		
Keishi-tō	桂枝湯	けいしとう	45	guì zhī tāng wán	桂枝湯丸
Keishi-bukuryō-gan	桂枝茯苓丸	けいしぶくりょうがん	25	guì zhī fú líng wán	桂枝茯苓丸
Keishi-bukuryō-gan-ka-yokui'nin	桂枝茯苓丸加よく苡仁	けいしぶくりょうがんかよくいにん	125	guì zhī fú líng wán	桂枝茯苓丸加薏苡仁
Keishi-ka-jutsubu-tō	桂枝加朮附湯	けいしかじゅつぶとう	18		桂枝术附汤
Keishi-ka-ryūkotsu-borei-tō	桂枝加竜骨牡蛎湯	けいしかりゅうこつぼれいとう	26		桂枝加龙骨牡蛎汤
Keishi-ka-shakuyaku-tō	桂枝加芍薬湯	けいしかしゃくやくとう	60		桂枝加芍药汤
Keishi-ka-shakuyaku-daiō-tō	桂枝加芍薬大黄湯	けいしかしゃくやくだいおうとう	134		
Keishi-ninjin-tō	桂枝人参湯	けいしにんじんとう	82		桂枝人参汤
Kihi-tō	帰脾湯	きひとう	65	guī pí wán	归脾丸
Kikyō-tō	桔梗湯	ききょうとう	138	jié gěng wán	桔梗丸
Kōso-san	香蘇散	こうそさん	70		香苏散
Kyūki-kyōgai-tō	きゅう帰膠艾湯	きゅうききょうがいとう	77		
Ma-kyō-kan-seki-tō	麻杏甘石湯	まきょうかんせきとう	55		麻杏甘石汤
Ma-kyō-yoku-kan-tō	麻杏よく甘湯	まきょうよくかんとう	78		
Maō-tō	麻黄湯	まおうとう	27	má huáng tāng wán	麻黃湯丸
Maō-bushi-saishin-tō	麻黄附子細辛湯	まおうぶしさいしんとう	127		麻黄附子细辛汤
Mashinin-gan	麻子仁丸	ましにんがん	126	má zǐ rén wán	麻子仁丸
Moku-boi-tō	木防已湯	もくぼういとう	36		
Nichin-tō	二陳湯	にちんとう	81	èr chén wán	二陳丸
Nijutsu-tō	二朮湯	にじゅつとう	88		
Ninjin-tō	人参湯	にんじんとう	32	rén shēn bài dú wán	人參敗毒丸
Ninjin-yōei-tō	人参養栄湯	にんじんようえいとう	108		人参养荣汤
Nyoshin-san	女神散	にょしんさん	67		
Ōgi-kenchū-tō	黄耆建中湯	おうぎけんちゅうとう	98		黄芪建中汤
Ōren-tō	黄連湯	おうれんとう	120	huáng lián sù wán	黃連素丸
Ōren-gedoku-tō	黄連解毒湯	おうれんげどくとう	15	huáng lián jiě dú wán	黃連解毒丸
Otsuji-tō	乙字湯	おつじとう	3		
Rikkō-san	立効散	りっこうさん	110		
Rikkunshi-tō	六君子湯	りっくんしとう	43	liù jūn zǐ wán	六君子丸
Rokumi-gan	六味丸	ろくみがん	87	liù wèi dì huáng wán	六味地黄丸
Ryō-kan-kyo-mi-shin-ge-nin-tō	苓甘姜味辛夏仁湯	りょうかんきょみしんげにんとう	119		
Ryō-kei-jutsu-kan-tō	苓桂朮甘湯	りょうけいじゅつかんとう	39	líng guì zhú gān tāng	苓桂术甘汤
Ryō-kyo-jutsu-kan-tō	苓姜朮甘湯	りょうきょじゅつかんとう	118		
Ryūtan-shakan-tō	竜胆瀉肝湯	りゅうたんしゃかんとう	76	lóng dǎn xiè gān wán	龍膽瀉肝丸
Saiboku-tō	柴朴湯	さいぼくとう	96		
Saikan-tō	柴陥湯	さいかんとう	73		
Saiko-ka-ryūkotsu-borei-tō	柴胡加竜骨牡蛎湯	さいこかりゅうこつぼれいとう	12		
Saiko-keishi-tō	柴胡桂枝湯	さいこけいしとう	10		
Saiko-keishi-kankyō-tō	柴胡桂枝乾姜湯	さいこけいしかんきょうとう	11		
Saiko-seikan-tō	柴胡清肝湯	さいこせいかんとう	80	chái hú shū gān wán	柴胡舒肝丸
Sairei-tō	柴苓湯	さいれいとう	114		
Sanmotsu-ōgon-tō	三物黄ごん湯	さんもつおうごんとう	121		
San'ō-shashin-tō	三黄瀉心湯	さんおうしゃしんとう	113		三黄泻心汤
Sansonin-tō	酸棗仁湯	さんそにんとう	103	suān zǎo rén tāng piàn	酸棗仁湯片
Seihai-tō	清肺湯	せいはいとう	90	qīng fèi yì huǒ piàn	清肺抑火片
Seijō-bōfū-tō	清上防風湯	せいじょうぼうふうとう	58		
Seishin-renshi-in	清心蓮子飲	せいしんれんしいん	111		
Seisho-ekki-tō	清暑益気湯	せいしょえっきとう	136		清暑益气汤
Senkyū-chachō-san	川きゅう茶調散	せんきゅうちゃちょうさん	124		
Sha-kanzō-tō	炙甘草湯	しゃかんぞうとう	64	zhì gān cǎo wán	炙甘草丸
Shakuyaku-kanzō-tō	芍薬甘草湯	しゃくやくかんぞうとう	68	sháo yào gān cǎo wán	芍藥甘草丸
Shichimotsu-kōka-tō	七物降下湯	しちもつこうかとう	46		
Shigyaku-san	四逆散	しぎゃくさん	35	sì nì sǎn wán	四逆散丸
Shikunshi-tō	四君子湯	しくんしとう	75	sì jūn zǐ tāng wán	四君子湯丸
Shimotsu-tō	四物湯	しもつとう	71	sì wù tāng wán	四物湯丸
Shinbu-tō	真武湯	しんぶとう	30	zhēn wǔ tāng wán	真武湯丸
Shin'i-seihai-tō	辛夷清肺湯	しんいせいはいとう	104		
Shinpi-tō	神秘湯	しんぴとう	85		
Shōfū-san	消風散	しょうふうさん	22	qīng qì huà tán wán	清氣化痰丸
Shō-hange-ka-bukuryō-tō	小半夏加茯苓湯	しょうはんげかぶくりょうとう	21		小半夏加茯苓汤
Shō-kenchū-tō	小建中湯	しょうけんちゅうとう	99	xiǎo jiàn zhōng wán	小健中丸
Shō-saiko-tō	小柴胡湯	しょうさいことう	9	xiǎo chái hú tāng wán	小柴胡汤丸
Shō-saiko-tō-ka-kikyō-sekkō	小柴胡湯加桔梗石膏	しょうさいことうかききょうせっこう	109	xiǎo chái hú tāng wán	小柴胡湯丸
Shō-seiryu-tō	小青竜湯	しょうせいりゅうとう	19	xiǎo qīng lóng wán	小青龍丸
Shōma-kakkon-tō	升麻葛根湯	しょうまかっこんとう	101		升麻葛根汤
Sokei-kakketsu-tō	疎経活血湯	そけいかっけつとう	53	tōng qiào huó xuè wán	通竅活血丸
Tōkaku-jōki-tō	桃核承気湯	とうかくじょうきとう	61		桃核承气汤
Tōki-tō	当帰湯	とうきとう	102	dāng guī wán	當歸丸
Tōki-inshi	当帰飲子	とうきいんし	86		当归饮子
Tōki-kenchū-tō	当帰建中湯	とうきけんちゅうとう	123		当归健中汤
Tōki-shakuyaku-san	当帰芍薬散	とうきしゃくやくさん	23		当归芍药散
Tōki-shigyaku-ka-goshū-shōkyo-tō	当帰四逆加呉茱萸生姜湯	とうきしぎゃくかごしゅうしょうきょとう	38	dāng guī sì nì wán	當歸四逆丸
Tsū-dō-san	通導散	つうどうさん	105		
Unkei-tō	温経湯	うんけいとう	106		温经汤
Unsei-in	温清飲	うんせいいん	57		
Yokuinin-tō	よく苡仁湯	よくいにんとう	52		
Yokukansan	抑肝散	よくかんさん	54	Yi-Gan San	
Yoku-kan-san-ka-chinpi-hange	抑肝散加陳皮半夏	よくかんさんかちんぴはんげ	83		

== OTC kampo/quasi kampo ==
Over the counter kampo (一般用医薬品 literally general use medicine) include some kampo/quasi kampo formulations that can be obtained without going to a kampo speciality store and/or without a prescription from a doctor. They can be bought from any drugstore or even convenience stores. In Japan, there is a tendency to list all plants ingredients together as a formulation. This contrasts with the USA, where additional (and optional) plant ingredients in a formulation are listed separately as inactive ingredients, and are not covered by a patent (only the active ingredient). For example, some nasal sprays in USA with oxymetazoline HCL (the active ingredient) contain menthol and eucalyptol listed as inactive ingredients. The addition of such ingredients does not constitute a novel formulation in US.

There is no rule that states kampo must not be mixed with Western medicines in a single formulation. Additionally, things like sustained release (徐放性製剤) have worked their way into the kampo and TCM worlds.

=== List ===
- Takeda Pharmaceuticals Ichoyaku K (胃腸薬K) formulation, It contains a blend of the traditional Chinese Koshaheiisan (香砂平胃散) and Chinese peony root, as one of 9 other plant ingredients. There are a few versions: powder form to be mixed with water, or for convenience tablet form, but also incorporates tablet making ingredients.
- Seirogan (正露丸)

== Herbs used in kampo medicines ==
The 14th edition of the Japanese Pharmacopoeia (JP) (日本薬局方 Nihon yakkyokuhō) lists 165 herbal ingredients that are used in kampo . Tsumura (ツムラ) is the leading maker of kampo medicine . They make 128 of the 148 kampo medicines. The most common herb in kampo medicine is Glycyrrhizae Radix (Chinese liquorice root). It is in 94 of the 128 Tsumura formulas. Other common herbs are Zingiberis Rhizoma (ginger)medicines (51 of 128 formulas) and Paeoniae Radix (Chinese peony root) (44 of 128 formulas).

== See also ==
- Chinese patent medicine
- Chinese classic herbal formula
