= Paeoniflorin =

Names
- Other names Paeonia moutan Paeony root Peoniflorin

Identifiers
CAS Number	23180-57-6
3D model (JSmol)	Interactive image
ChemSpider	390957
ECHA InfoCard	100.041.327
PubChem CID	442534
UNII	21AIQ4EV64
CompTox Dashboard (EPA)	DTXSID2042648
- InChI: InChI=1S/C23H28O11/c1-20-9-22(29)13-7-23(20,32-18-16(27)15(26)14(25)12(8-24)31-18)21(13,19(33-20)34-22)10-30-17(28)11-5-3-2-4-6-11/h2-6,12-16,18-19,24-27,29H,7-10H2,1H3/t12-,13-,14-,15+,16-,18+,19-,20+,21+,22-,23+/m1/s1 Key: YKRGDOXKVOZESV-WRJNSLSBSA-N; InChI=1/C23H28O11/c1-20-9-22(29)13-7-23(20,32-18-16(27)15(26)14(25)12(8-24)31-18)21(13,19(33-20)34-22)10-30-17(28)11-5-3-2-4-6-11/h2-6,12-16,18-19,24-27,29H,7-10H2,1H3/t12-,13-,14-,15+,16-,18+,19-,20+,21+,22-,23+/m1/s1 Key: YKRGDOXKVOZESV-WRJNSLSBBV
- SMILES: O=C(OC[C@@]35[C@@H]4[C@]1(O)O[C@H]5O[C@@](C1)([C@@]3(O[C@@H]2O[C@H](CO)[C@@H](O)[C@H](O)[C@H]2O)C4)C)c6ccccc6

Properties
Chemical formula	C_{23}H_{28}O_{11}
Molar mass	480.466 g·mol^{−1}
- Except where otherwise noted, data are given for materials in their standard state (at 25 °C [77 °F], 100 kPa). Infobox references

Paeoniflorin is a chemical compound which is one of the major constituents of an herbal medicine derived from Paeonia lactiflora. It can also be isolated from the fresh water fern Salvinia molesta.

In Paeonia, it can form new compounds with addition of phenolic substituents. In a study in female rats, paeoniflorin was found to inhibit the production of testosterone within the ovaries, however does not significantly affect the production of estradiol. In mice, paeoniflorin was shown to protect against neuroinflammation and depression-like behavior induced by FN alpha.
