= Peucedanum praeruptorum =

Scientific classification
- Kingdom: Plantae
- Clade: Tracheophytes
- Clade: Angiosperms
- Clade: Eudicots
- Clade: Asterids
- Order: Apiales
- Family: Apiaceae
- Genus: Peucedanum
- Species: P. praeruptorum

Binomial name
- Peucedanum praeruptorum Dunn

Species of plant

Peucedanum praeruptorum, known in China as qianhu (前胡), is a plant native and grown in the Chinese provinces of Zhejiang, Sichuan, and Hunan, commonly used in traditional medicine.
