= Chinese patent medicine =

Herbal medicines in ready-to-use form

Chinese patent medicine (CPM, simplified Chinese: 科学中药; traditional Chinese: 科學中藥; pinyin: kēxúe zhōngyào; lit. 'scientific Chinese medicine' or simplified Chinese: 中成药; traditional Chinese: 中成藥; pinyin: zhōngchéngyào; lit. 'pre-made Chinese medicine') (Note: As can be glanced from the difference in literal meaning, there exists a definitional gap between the "scientific" term used in Taiwan and the "pre-made" term used in Mainland China and Hong Kong. The Taiwanese term is defined exclusive of traditional ready-to-use forms such as the Wan, Dan, and Gao, while the Chinese term includes all ready-made, batch-manufactured TCM-based medicine.) are herbal medicines in traditional Chinese medicine (TCM), modernized into a ready-to-use form such as tablets, oral solutions or dry suspensions, as opposed to herbs that require cooking (hot water extraction).

== History ==
Traditional Chinese medication generally begins with a liquid extract of a mixture of prepared herbs (饮片), produced by a long period of boiling in water or a mixture of water and alcohol. Some formulas require different extraction times for each herb, leading to a complicated sequence of adding ingredients. With formulas intended for internal use, the resulting decoction (Tang 汤) is typically drunk directly. Some classical formulas call for turning the decoction into a ready-made teapill (Wan or Dan) for easier use. Formulas intended for external use, such as the gou pi gao, calls for more involved post-processing.

Chinese patent medicine started as a simplified way to produce a decoction. In the 1950s, Japanese man Otozo Nagakura founded a business that makes Kampo medicine in granule form by dehydrating the extract liquid. Patients would simply re-hydrate the granules and drink the resulting fluid. Taiwanese man Xu Hong-yuan visited Nagakura's factory and was impressed by its convenience and efficiency, bringing the technology to Taiwan.

Xu Hong-yuan later also invented the single-herb "granules for use in combination", which grants similar convenience to customized prescriptions. (Per-patient formulation is emphasized in TCM.) Chinese use of single-herb granules is growingly common, but technically remains experimental.

=== In China ===
The 1963 edition of the Chinese Pharmacopoeia lists more than 150 so-called "pre-made prescriptions" (中药成方) in traditional liquid, paste, Wan (丸) pill, and Dan (丹) pill forms. The next edition of 1977 includes more obviously "modernized" forms: tablets, sprays, granules, and even injections.

== Forms ==
=== Traditional forms ===
A few forms used in standardized, ready-to-use traditional Chinese medicine are inherited from the classical works. These include extracted condensed pills called teapills, honey pills and water pills made from ground raw herbs, mixture of powders (San 散), and paste (Gao 膏).

Teapills are usually small, spherical, and black. They gain their name because the herbs are cooked into a herbal tea to make the pills. Modern teapills are created from herbs extracted in stainless steel extractors to create either a water decoction or water-alcohol decoction, depending on the herbs used. They are extracted at a low temperature (below 100 degrees Celsius; 212 degrees Fahrenheit) to preserve essential ingredients. The extracted liquid is then further condensed and a small amount of raw herb powder from one of the herbal ingredients is mixed in to form a herbal dough. This dough is then cut into tiny pieces by a machine, and a small amount of excipients are added for a smoother and a more consistent exterior. The products are then made as pills.

Honey or water pills made from ground raw herbs are also a popular format in China, and they tend to be larger and are slightly to significantly softer than teapills. Honey pills and water pills have been made since ancient times by combining several dried herbs and other ingredients, which are grounded into powder, mixed with a binder and traditionally formed into pills by hand. Modern honey or water pills are formed into pills by machine. The binder is traditionally honey for honey pills. For water pills the binder may simply be water, or may include another binder, such as molasses. Modern manufacturers still produce many patent formulas as honey or water pills, such as Wuji Baifeng Wan, a popular honey pill formula to "nourish qi and blood", to strengthen the body.

Also common are external-use products: plasters (also gao 膏), tinctures, and liniments. Some medicated liquors are for both internal and external use.

=== Newer forms ===
As mentioned in the "History" section, the original form of Chinese patent medicine is the extract granule. A granule can be reconstituted with water much like an instant tea. Granules are made by drying a decoction and serve as a more convenient form the decoction, with no prolonged boiling needed. Sugar is often added as excipient and sweetener. Similarly, a powder derived from drying a decoction can be pressed into a tablet or packaged into a capsule.

Another form that only became common with modern packaging is the liquid. The liquid can be water-based similar to the tea used to make the teapill, or be an alcohol-based extract of herbs. "Ten drops of water" (十滴水), a medication supposedly for heat illness, is an alcohol-based liquid. It has also been packaged into a softgel.

=== Forms for use in combination ===
Some forms of Chinese patent medicine is not intended for direct use by the patient, but are extracts for mixing with other herbs or extracts to produce a customized formula. When each boiled-extract corresponds to one single herb, they can be mixed together according to a traditional Chinese medicine prescription, substituting the herbs to be boiled with a corresponding amount of the extract. The main example of this class is "granules for use in combination" (中药配方颗粒) – granules made from drying a decoction. These forms give the no-boil convenience of CPMs to TCM practitioners who provide customized prescriptions for each patient.

Fixed-formula Chinese patent medicine have also made use of similar approaches to simplify manufacture and to use more modern extraction methods. For example, volume 1 of the Chinese Pharmacopoeia (which deals with TCM and CPM) includes such ingredients as a rhubarb extract (extracted using hot water-ethanol mixture), a ginkgo leaf extract (extracted using a dilute water solution of ethanol), and a total ginsenoside [from] ginseng root (extracted through column chromatography).

=== Injections ===
A phenomenon mostly confined to China is the use of TCM-derived fluids for injection. Originally an attempt at rationing herb use during the Second Sino-Japanese War, numerous TCM-derived injections have been formulated and used in China. By the 1980s, as many as 1400 different injections are on the market. In the 1980s, a stronger regulatory framework was established for these injections. Reports of severe adverse effects have encouraged further improvements in regulation, with safety re-evalulation started in 2009. Another re-evaluation, this time combining safety and effectiveness, was started in 2017. In 2022, Lian Bi Zhi injection became the first TCM injection to be delisted due to failing postmarket re-evaluation.

The most common adverse effect events for TCM injections are fevers, allergy, and allergy-like symptoms (e.g. mediated through mast cell or complement system), with the last being the most common. One particularly serious offender, Houttuynia cordata injection, has caused 22 deaths through anaphylactic shock in a span of 2 years. Its package insert has since been modified to remove intravenous use as an accepted route, leaving intramuscular only.

National regulatory infrastructure now exists for collecting reports of adverse effects. The proportion of injection-related adverse events in all TCM-related adverse events is trending down since 2017.

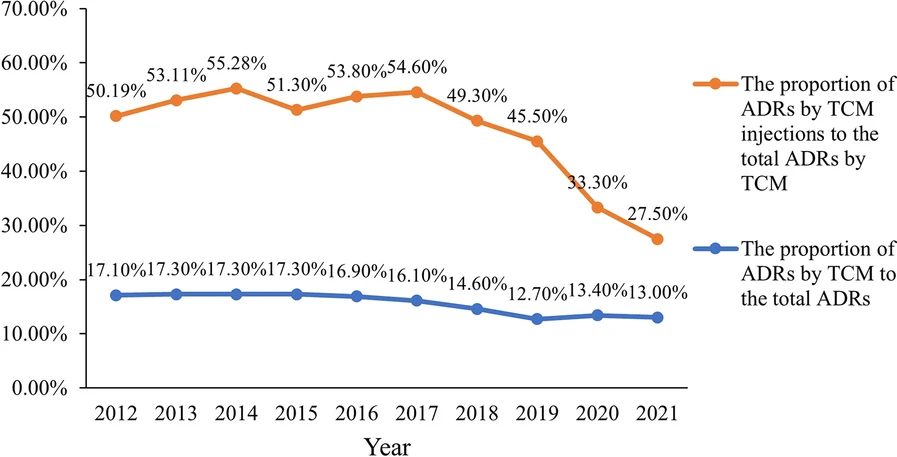
Adverse drug response trend for TCM injections, 2012 - 2021.

== Regulation ==
Like other patent medicines, they are not necessarily patented in the traditional sense of the word. Typically no-one has exclusive rights to the formula. (Note: A patent can still be applied to a newly-formulated Chinese patent medicine, which is the case for Xinyue capsule, a preparation of American ginseng leaf-and-stem ginsenosides introduced in 2003.) The term patent medicine is borrowed to refer to their often unclear effectiveness. Unlike Western "patent medicine" of old, these products have a fixed proportion of ingredients, as they are put under a modern regulatory framework.

=== China ===
In China, all Chinese patent medicines of the same name have the same proportions of ingredients, and are manufactured in accordance with the PRC Pharmacopoeia's monograph on that particular formula, which is mandated by Chinese law. Each monograph details the exact herbal ingredients that make up the patent formula, usually accompanied by the specific tests that should be used for correct herb identification, such as thin layer chromatography (TLC) or high performance liquid chromatography (HPLC), the percentage of each ingredient, and specific cautions and contraindications. The monograph also details the manufacturing methods that must be followed, how to process and cook the herbs, often including specific requirements for finished product testing including authenticating and assessing the potency of the formula with active ingredient markers where known, as well as testing for dissolution time and content uniformity. All good manufacturing practice (GMP) certified factories must also test for heavy metal levels and microbials for all patent medicines they produce.

However, many patent medications do not list all ingredients, presumably to protect the secrecy of the formula. An example of this is Yunnan Baiyao, a popular formula used to stop bleeding, whose ingredients have never been revealed. This is an acceptable practice in China, where no other protection exists to protect family or "secret" Chinese herbal formulas. The state has access to the Yunnan Baiyao formula for regulatory purposes.

=== Japan ===
Traditional Chinese medicine entered Japan in the 7th century and has been developing on its own as Kampō. As mentioned earlier, the practice of producing ready-to-use granules originated in Japan. The Ministry of Health, Labour and Welfare manages a Kampo list which contains specific approved forms of mixed and single-herb herbal medicine. In October 2000, a nationwide study reported that 72% of registered physicians prescribe Kampō medicines.

=== Other countries ===
In western countries, there is considerable variation of ingredients and in the proportions of ingredients in products sharing the same name. This is because the Chinese government allows foreign companies to apply for modifications of patent formulas to be sold outside of China. For example, Hebei 河北 brand Lĭfèi Wán (理肺丸; 'lung-conditioning Wan') contain Kadsura vine (风沙藤; fēngshāténg) and Morus alba leaf (桑叶; sāngyè), whereas Plum Flower 梅花 brand Lĭfèi Piàn (理肺片; 'lung-conditioning tablets') contains Schisandra chinensis fruit (五味子; wǔwèizǐ) and Gecko flesh (蛤蚧; géjiè) instead. Another example is Qīng Qì Huà Tán Wán (清气化痰丸; 'Qi-clearing and sputum-dissolving Wan'). The Lanzou brand uses Mandarin orange peel (陈皮; chénpí). The Lanzhou Foci (蘭州佛慈)/Min Shan (岷山) brand and the Plum Flower brand do not, but use ginger rhizome (生姜; shēngjiāng).

For comparison, the monograph for Qīng Qì Huà Tán Wán in the 2020 edition of the PRC Pharmacopoeia uses 陈皮; chénpí and no ginger. The 2020 edition of the PRC Pharmacopoeia does not have a monograph for Lĭfèi Wán or Lĭfèi Piàn, though it has monographs with other preparations with Lĭfèi in the name.

== Examples ==
=== Classic formulas ===
Chinese classic herbal formulas form the basis of Chinese patent medicine. These are the basic herbal formulas that all students of traditional Chinese medicine learn. Many of these formulas are quite old. For example, liù wèi dì huáng wán (六味地黄丸) was developed by Qián Yǐ (钱乙) (c. 1032–1113 CE). It was published in the "Key to Therapeutics of Children's Diseases" (小儿药证直诀; xiǎoér yào zhèng zhí jué) in 1119 by Qian Yi's student. Although Liu Wei Di Huang Wan can be prepared as a raw herb decoction (or herbal tea), it was originally created to be made into honey pills. The last word in Liu Wei Di Huang Wan, "Wan" (丸) means "pill".

Under Chinese regulations, non-injection-type CPM applications based on a classical formula are given a fast-tracked approval process. The usual clinical studies for effectiveness and safety can be omitted, and only a pre-clinical safety study is required. More than a dozen new CPMs are approved every year, some based on classical formulas, others new inventions.

=== Heritage formulas ===
There are also old formulas that are not part of the TCM canon, but nevertheless surviving to this day as patent medicine preparations. Some examples are:

- Dit da jow; one 17th-century formula by Feng Liaoxing is included in the Chinese Pharmacopoeia. Feng's formulas for this medicinal liquor is for both internal and external use. It is listed in Guangdong's provincial list of intangible cultural heritages.
- Zheng Gu Shui: liniment, invented in the earlier half of the 20th century. Included in the Chinese Pharmacopoeia.
- Various Chinese herb teas, a few of which are included in the NMPA standards.

=== Modern formulas ===
Notable new formulas created after the 1950s invention of granules include:

- Ganmaoling (感冒灵), a cold medicine in the form of a sweet-tasting herbal tea (granules). Incorporates menthol, paracetamol, chlorphennamine maleate, and caffeine.
- Realgar/Indigo naturalis, an arsenic drug for acute promyelocytic leukemia.
- Lianhua Qingwen, promoted by the Chinese government for Covid-19; one clinical trial in support of the drug had an undisclosed conflict-of-interest.
- NRICM101, a Covid-19 prescription from Taiwan.

== Criticisms ==
=== Heavy metal contamination ===
Some Chinese patent medicines were tested and found to contain high to dangerous levels of heavy metals. The most common heavy metals found were mercury, lead, and arsenic. These ingredients can cause serious medical problems.

Many heavy metal contaminants named in the context of herbal medicine is intentionally added and declared on product labels. The mercury salt cinnabar (朱砂; zhūshā), the arsenic salt realgar (雄黄; xíong huáng) and the strychnine-containing Strychnos nux-vomica (马钱子; Mǎqiánzǐ) are used traditionally and kept in China despite the known harm and little proven benefit.

=== Pharmaceutical adulterants ===
Some Chinese patent medicines were found to contain pharmaceutical drugs such as decongestants, analgesics or antihistamines. The most common Chinese patent medicines found to carry pharmaceutical drugs were for the treatment of asthma, pain, and arthritis.

Many drug adulterants are intentionally added and declared on product labels. For example, the entry for "Vitamin C/Lonicera/Forsythia tablet" (维C银翘片; Wéi C Yínqiào Piàn) in the Chinese Pharmacopoeia (ChP) calls for 105 mg of paracetamol and 1.05 mg of chlorpheniramine maleate each pill. Such a combination is common for Chinese cold medicine. In a more hidden case, the herb Ephedra naturally contains ephedrine and pseudoephedrine, and is required by the ChP to have more than 0.8% of the two decongestants (as hydrochloride salts) in its dry weight.

=== Prohibited ingredients ===
Some Chinese patent medicines contain ingredients which are banned in other countries. The two most common prohibited herbs are Ephedra (麻黄; máhuáng) (Ephedra) and Ban Xia (半夏; bànxià) (Pinellia). On 30 December 2003, the FDA in the US announced a ban (effective 12 April 2004), on these herbs from all dietary supplements. Traditional Chinese herbal remedies are exempt from this law.

The 2020 version of the Chinese Pharmacopoeia removed pangolin scale and Aristolochia debilis from allowed ingredients.

== Regulation ==
=== In Taiwan ===
In modern-day Taiwan, regulations to address the criticisms are introduced due to Chinese patent medicines being prescription drugs since the 1970s and a part of the public health system since 1995.

Taiwan Herbal Pharmacopeia (ISBN 9789860354157) provides information on acceptable herbs in Taiwan.

==== Heavy metal contamination and pesticide residue ====
All Chinese patent medicine products sold in Taiwan must pass a heavy metal limitation test and pesticide residue test according to Taiwan Herbal Pharmacopeia. There are several manufacturers in Taiwan certified ISO 17025 Lab, for example: Sun-Ten (順天堂), Chuang Song Zong Pharmaceutical Co., Ltd. (Chinese: 莊松榮)

==== Pharmaceutical adulterants ====
According to Taiwanese government law, products licenses will be suspended if there exists pharmaceutical adulterants. Furthermore, it could cause GMP certificate to be cancelled. In Taiwan, those main manufacturer in order to export products abroad, few of them has passed PIC/S GMP audition. For example: Sun-Ten (順天堂), Chuang Song Zong Pharmaceutical Co., Ltd. (Chinese: 莊松榮).

=== In China ===
As with more traditional formulae, standards for Chinese patent medicine are found in Volume 1 of Chinese Pharmacopoeia. Some of the resultant medications require a prescription to purchase, while others are considered over-the-counter drugs. Heavy metal limits are present for a few herbs, although they tend to be laxer than those defined for foods. As listed above, intentionally added heavy metals and drug adulterants are found in many products.

== See also ==
- Kampo (Japanese adaptation of Chinese medicine)
- Kampo list (list of Japanese versions of Chinese patent medicines)
