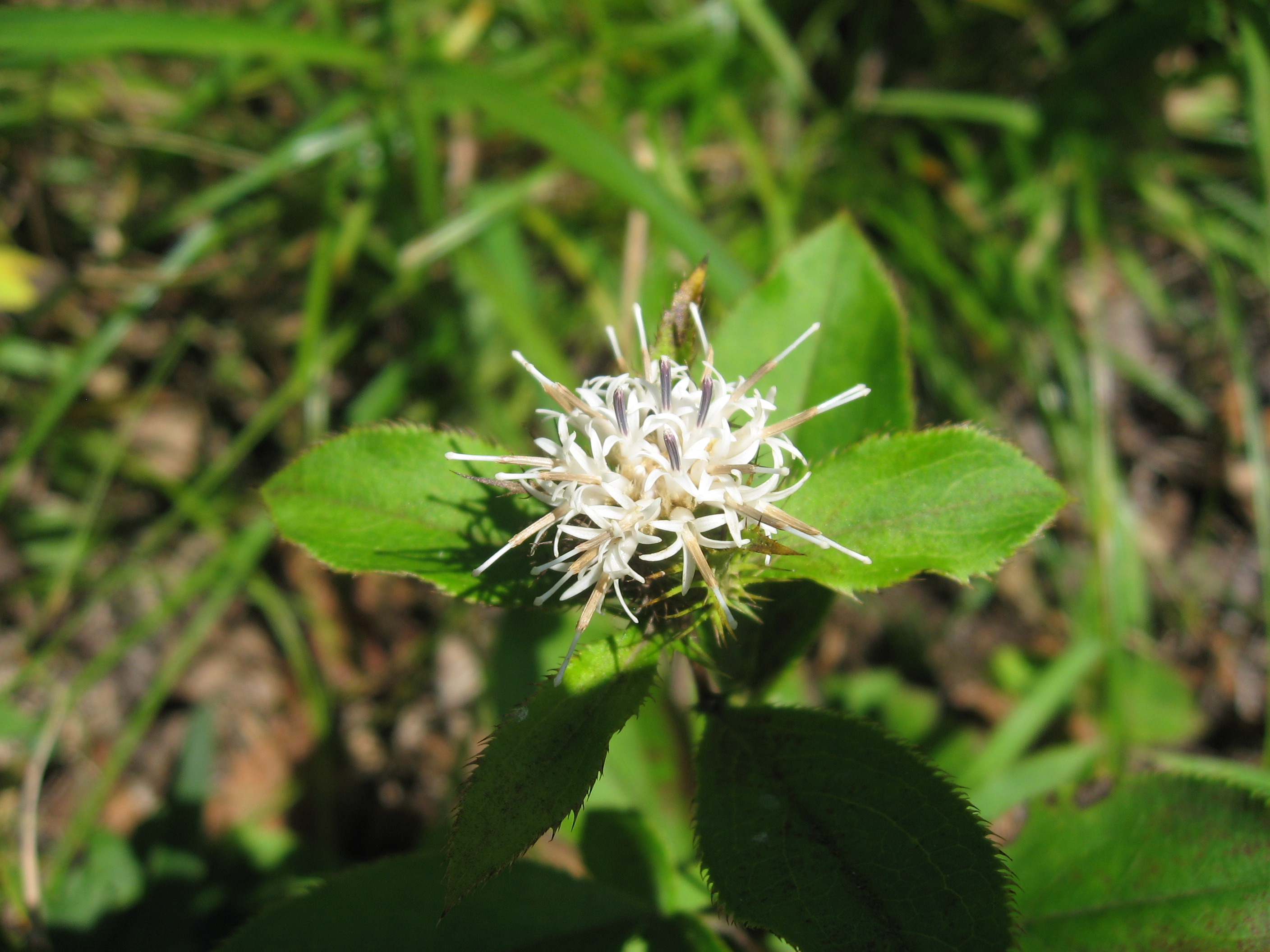
- Flower
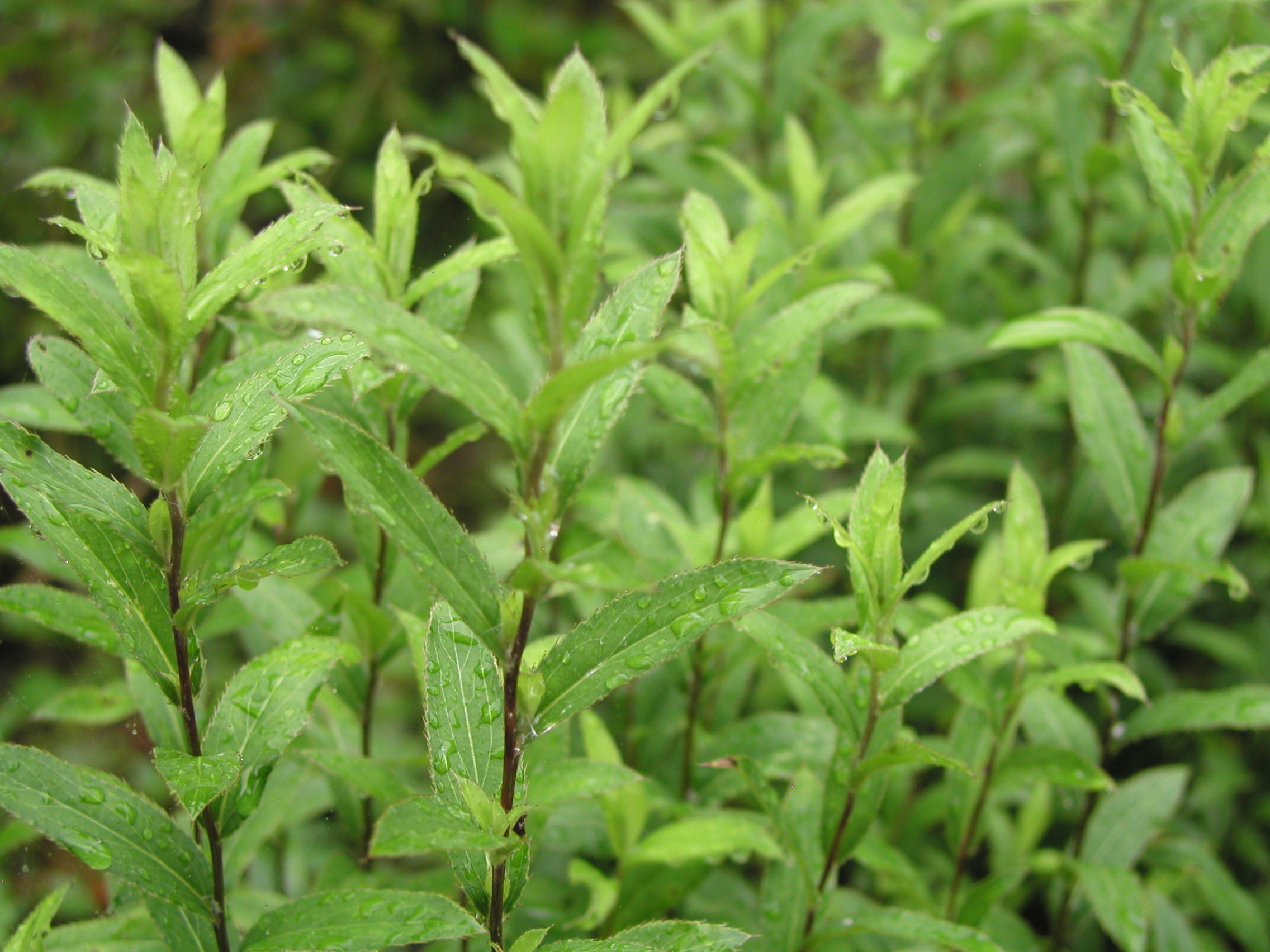
- Foliage

Scientific classification
- Kingdom: Plantae
- Clade: Tracheophytes
- Clade: Angiosperms
- Clade: Eudicots
- Clade: Asterids
- Order: Asterales
- Family: Asteraceae
- Genus: Atractylodes
- Species: A. lancea

Binomial name
- Atractylodes lancea (Thunb.) DC.

Synonyms
- List: Acarna chinensis Bunge; Acarna lancea (Thunb.) Willd.; Acarna ovata (Thunb.) Willd.; Atractylis chinensis (Bunge) DC.; Atractylis chinensis f. erosodentata (Koidz.) Hand.-Mazz.; Atractylis chinensis var. liaotungensis Kitag.; Atractylis chinensis var. liatungensis Kitag.; Atractylis chinensis var. loeseneri Kitag.; Atractylis chinensis var. quiqueloba Baranova & Skvortsov; Atractylis chinensis var. simplicifolia (Loes.) Baranova & Skvortsov; Atractylis chinensis f. simplicifolia (Loes.) Hand.-Mazz.; Atractylis chinensis f. stapfii (Baroni) Hand.-Mazz.; Atractylis erosodentata (Koidz.) Arènes; Atractylis japonica (Koidz. ex Kitam.); Atractylis lancea Thunb.; Atractylis lyrata (Siebold & Zucc.) Hand.-Mazz.; Atractylis lyrata f. ternata (Kom.) Nakai; Atractylis ovata Thunb.; Atractylis ovata f. amurensis Freyn ex Kom.; Atractylis ovata f. lyratifolia Kom.; Atractylis ovata f. pinnatifolia Kom.; Atractylis ovata var. simplicifolia Loes.; Atractylis ovata f. simplicifolia (Loes.) Kom.; Atractylis ovata var. ternata Kom.; Atractylis ovata f. ternata Kom.; Atractylis pinnatifolia (Kom.) S.Y.Hu; Atractylis separata L.H.Bailey; Atractylodes chinensis (Bunge) Koidz.; Atractylodes chinensis var. liaotungensis (Kitag.) Y.C.Chu; Atractylodes chinensis f. quinqueloba (Baranova & Skvortsov) Y.C.Chu; Atractylodes chinensis var. simplicifolia (Loes.) Kitag.; Atractylodes chinensis f. simplicifolia (Loes.) Y.C.Chu; Atractylodes erosodentata Koidz.; Atractylodes japonica Koidz. ex Kitam.; Atractylodes japponica var. coriacea Konta & Katsuy.; Atractylodes lancea var. chinensis (Bunge) Kitam.; Atractylodes lancea subsp. luotianensis S.L.Hu & X.F.Feng; Atractylodes lancea var. simplicifolia (Loes.) Kitam.; Atractylodes lyrata Siebold & Zucc.; Atractylodes lyrata var. ternata (Kom.) Koidz.; Atractylodes ovata (Thunb.) DC.; Giraldia stapfii Baroni

= Atractylodes lancea =

Species of plant

Atractylodes lancea (syns. Atractylodes chinensis, Atractylodes japonica, Atractylodes ovata; Japanese: オケラ, romanized: okera, Eastern ukera, ukira) is a species of flowering plant in the family Asteraceae, native to Vietnam, most of China, Korea, the southern Russian Far East, and Japan. It is the source of cāng zhú (蒼朮), a Chinese herbal medicine sold to people suffering from a variety of ailments.

Note variation in leaf shape on individual plant
