= Cāng zhú =

Medicinal herb Chinese

Cāng zhú (苍术 or 蒼术 or 蒼朮), also known as black atractylodes rhizome or Rhizoma atractylodes, is used as a Chinese herbal medicine. It is the dried rhizome of Atractylodes lancea (Thunb.) DC., synonyms Atractylodes chinensis (DC.) Koidz, and Atractylodes japonica Koidz.

Its purported medicinal effect is distinguished from bái zhú (白术 or 白朮, white atractylodes rhizome from Atractylodes macrocephala), which is typically cultivated, whereas cāng zhú more often tends to be collected from the wild. It is believed that the distinction between cāng zhú and bái zhú emerged in relatively modern times; a single compound "zhú" described in the Shen nong ben cao jing probably included many Atractylodes species.

== Production ==
=== Cultivation ===
- A. lancea is grown mainly in Hubei and Jiangsu.
- A. chinensis and A. japonica are grown in Jilin, Liaoning, Shandong, Inner Mongolia, and Korea.

=== Harvesting ===
The rhizome is dug up in the spring. After cleaning, it can be sliced and stir baked to a yellow brown color.

== Traditional attributes ==
In traditional Chinese medicine, the herb is described as spicy or pungent, bitter, warm, and aromatic, acting on the spleen and stomach meridians.

Effects of the herb are supposed to be ways of "drying dampness":

- As a stomachic - for "damp obstruction or accumulation in the Middle Jiao", with symptoms such as low appetite, abdominal distension, epigastric distress and fullness, indigestion, dyspepsia, diarrhea, nausea and vomiting, weariness, a heavy sensation in the body, and a thick greasy tongue coating.
- To eliminate exopathogens - to "dispel wind-damp-cold (bi-syndrome)", explained as "headaches and body aches, fever, chills, blocked nasal passages, and an absence of sweating"
- To treat "damp heat conditions" in the lower Jiao, including "Damp Leg Qi, aching and swollen joints, and vaginal discharge" (leukorrhea). This includes relieving arthralgia, swollen knees, and foot pain. Treatment of these conditions can involve combinations such as San Miao San or Er Maio San.
- To induce sweating.

It is also used:

- To treat night blindness or optic atrophy, either alone or as a component of Shi Ju Ming.
- To relieve stagnant liver qi, reducing stress and relieving depression, in mixtures such as Jue Ju Wan.

== Contraindications ==
"Yin deficiency, deficiency of essence, and external asthenia and sweating" (due to Wei Qi deficiency) are traditional contraindications. It has been noted to interfere with drugs for diabetes. It can cause allergic reactions in those who are allergic to ragweed, marigolds, daisies, or related herbs (Asteraceae). It should not be used by pregnant women or women who are breastfeeding.

== Biochemical analysis ==
One review stated that the volatile oil contains the chemical components, β-eudesmol and hinesol.

Compounds isolated from a hexane extract of A. lancea included atractylochromene, a potent inhibitor of 5-lipoxygenase and cyclooxygenase; 2-[(2E)-3,7-dimethyl-2,6-octadienyl]-6-methyl-2,5-cyclohexadiene-1,4-dione, a selective inhibitor of lipoxygenase; atractylon and osthol, weak inhibitors of lipoxygenase, and atractylenolides I, II, and III.

Other major active ingredients in A. lancea include polyynes, in particular atractylodin.

A few sources have reported antimicrobial activity for the herb when burned as an incense.

Other components of the rhizome include:

- taraxerol acetate and φ-taraxasteryl acetate
- β-sitosterol
- stigmasterol and stigmasterol 3-O-β-D-glucopyranoside
- β-eudesmol
- atractylenolides I-IV
- daucosterol
- several acylsucrose derivatives in which sucrose is modified by three to four 3-methylbutanoyl moieties.
- additional sesquiterpenes
