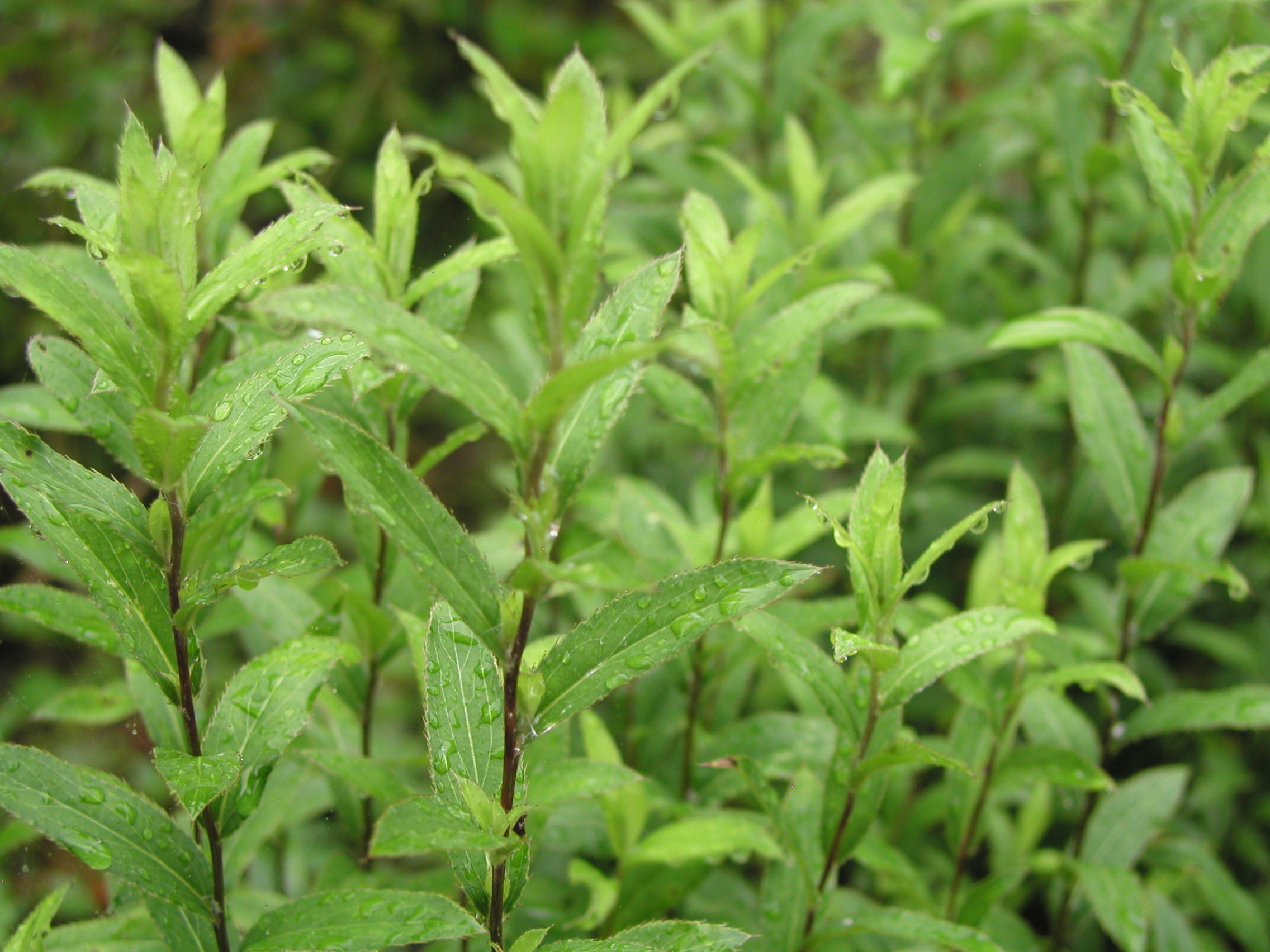
- Atractylodes lancea

Scientific classification
- Kingdom: Plantae
- Clade: Tracheophytes
- Clade: Angiosperms
- Clade: Eudicots
- Clade: Asterids
- Order: Asterales
- Family: Asteraceae
- Subfamily: Carduoideae
- Tribe: Cardueae
- Subtribe: Carlininae
- Genus: Atractylodes; DC.

Synonyms
- Giraldia Baroni

= Atractylodes =

Genus of flowering plants

Atractylodes is a genus of Asian flowering plants in the family Asteraceae.

== Species ==
Atractylodes is native to eastern Asia.

- Atractylodes amurensis – Korea, Amur
- Atractylodes carlinoides – Hubei
- Atractylodes japonica – Japan, Korea, Manchuria, Inner Mongolia, Primorye
- Atractylodes koreana – Korean atractylodes – Korea, Liaoning, Shandong
- Atractylodes lancea – Japan, Korea, Primorye, Myanmar, Vietnam, India
- Atractylodes macrocephala – China, Japan, Korea, Vietnam, India
- Atractylodes ovata – ovate-leaf atractylodes – Primorye, Amur, Khabarovsk, Japan, Korea, Manchuria, Inner Mongolia
- Atractylodes rubra

== Medicinal uses ==
The rhizome of some species, including Atractylodes lancea, and A. macrocephala (Chinese: 白朮), are used in traditional Chinese medicine, and in Japanese medicine, as a diuretic, an anti-inflammatory, an anti-coagulant, together with other uses.
