= Chinese classic herbal formula =

Chinese herbology formulae

Chinese classic herbal formulas (simplified Chinese: 经方; traditional Chinese: 經方) are combinations of herbs used in Chinese herbology for supposed greater efficiency in comparison to individual herbs. They are the basic herbal formulas that students of Traditional Chinese medicine learn. Later these students will adapt these classic formulas to match the needs of each patient.

== History ==
Many of these formulas were created by the pioneers of Chinese medicine and are quite old. For example, "Liu Wei Di Huang Wan" (六味地黄丸; liùwèi dìhuáng wán; liu-wei ti-huang wan) was developed by Qian Yi (钱乙 Qián Yǐ) (c. 1032–1113 CE). It was published in the "Xiao'er Yao Zheng Zhi Jue" (also known as "Key to Therapeutics of Children's Diseases" 小儿药证直诀; Xiǎoér yào zhèng zhí jué; Hsiao-erh yao cheng chih chüeh) in 1119 by Qian Yi's student.

== Modern use ==
Many of these formulas are still made in the form of Chinese patent medicine. These formulas are also used in kampo (traditional Japanese medicine). In Japan, herbalists do not create medicine for each patient. Instead the herbalist will choose an herbal formula that has been standardized by the Japanese government. These formulas are based on the Chinese classic herbal formulas. However, they often vary slightly. Sometimes Chinese plants are substituted for plants found in Japan, or the proportions of the formula are changed slightly.

== Manufacturer list ==
The top 5 manufacturers in Taiwan

- Sun-ten (順天堂)
- Chuang Song Zong Pharmaceutical Co., Ltd. (莊松榮)
- Shen Chang (勝昌)
- Kaiser (港香蘭)
- Ko-da (科達)

== List ==
There are hundreds of Chinese classic herbal formulas. Many are slight variations of other formula however. It is difficult to define which of these formulas are the most common. The two leading brands to export Chinese classic herbal formulas in the form of Chinese patent medicine from China are Mín Shān (岷山) and Plum Flower (梅花). Some of these formulas are made by these 2 brands.

Title	English	Chinese (S)	Chinese (T)	Pinyin
An Mian Pian	Peaceful Sleep Pills	安眠片	安眠片	ān mián piàn
An Shen Bu Xin Wan	Calm Spirit Tonify Heart Pills	安神补心丸	安神補心丸	ān shén bǔ xīn wán
An Shui Wan	Calm Sleep Pills	安睡丸	安睡丸	ānshuì wán
An Zhong San	Calm the Middle Powder	安中散	安中散	Ān Zhōng Săn
Ba Wei Di Huang Wan	Eight-Ingredient Pill with Rehmannia	八味地黄丸	八味地黃丸	Bā Wèi Dì Huáng Wán
Ba Zhen Tang	Eight-Treasure Decoction	八珍汤	八珍湯	Bā Zhēn Tāng
Ba Zheng Wan	Eight-Herb Formula For Rectification Teapills	八珍丸	八珍丸	bā zhèng wán
Bai He Gu Jin Wan	Lilium Teapills	百合固金丸	百合固金丸	bǎi hé gù jīn wán
Bai Hu Jia Ren Shen Tang	White Tiger plus Ginseng Decoction	白虎加人参汤	白虎加人參湯	Bái Hŭ Jiā Rén Shēn Tāng
Bai Hu Tang	White Tiger Teapills	白虎汤丸	白虎湯丸	bái hǔ tāng
Bai Xing Shi Gan Wan		白杏石甘丸	白杏石甘丸	bái xìng shí gān wán
Bai Zi Yang Xin Wan		柏子养心丸	柏子養心丸	bǎi zǐ yǎng xīn wán
Ba Ji Yin Yang Wan		巴戟阴阳丸	巴戟陰陽丸	bā jǐ yīn yáng wán
Ban Xia Bai Zhu Tian Ma Tang	Pinellia, Atractylodes Macrocephala, and Gastrodia Decoction	半夏白术天麻汤	半夏白朮天麻湯	Bàn Xià Bái Zhú Tiān Má Tāng
Ban Xia Hou Po Wan	Pinellia & Magnolia Teapills	半夏厚朴丸	半夏厚樸丸	bàn xià hòu pō wán
Ban Xia Xie Xin Tang	Pinellia Decoction to Drain the Epigastrium	半夏泻心汤	半夏瀉心湯	Bàn Xià Xiè Xīn Tāng
Bao Chan Wu You Fang	Preserve Pregnancy and Care-Free Decoction	保产无忧方	保產無憂方	Băo Chăn Wú Yōu Fāng
Bao He Wan	Preserve Harmony Pill	保和丸	保和丸	bǎo hé wán
Bei Mu Gua Lou San	Fritillaria and Trichosanthes Fruit Powder	贝母瓜蒌散	貝母瓜蔞散	Bèi Mŭ Guā Lóu Săn
Bi Min Gan Wan	Pe Min Kan Wan	鼻敏感丸	鼻敏感丸	bí mǐn gǎn wán
Bi Xie Fen Qing Wan		萆薢分清丸	萆薢分清丸	bì xiè fēn qīng wán
Bi Xie Sheng Shi Wan	Subdue The Dampness Teapills	萆懈胜湿丸	萆懈勝濕丸	bì xiè shèng shī wán
Bi Yan Pian		鼻炎片	鼻炎片	bí yán piàn
Bu Fei Wan		补肺丸	補肺丸	bǔ fèi wán
Bu Nao Pian		补脑片	補腦片	bǔ nǎo piàn
Bu Yang Huan Wu Wan	Great Yang Restoration Teapills	补阳还五丸	補陽還五丸	bǔ yáng huán wǔ wán
Bu Zhong Yi Qi Wan	Tonify the Middle Augment the Qi Pill	补中益气丸	補中益氣丸	bǔ zhōng yì qì wán
Cang Er Zi	Upper Chamber Teapills	苍耳子丸	蒼耳子丸	cāng ěr zǐ
Chai Ge Jie Ji Tang	Bupleurum and Kudzu Decoction to Release the Muscle Layer	柴葛解肌汤	柴葛解肌湯	Chái Gĕ Jiĕ Jī Tāng
Chai Hu Gui Zhi Tang	Bupleurum and Cinnamon Twig Decoction	柴胡桂枝汤	柴胡桂枝湯	Chái Hú Guì Zhī Tāng
Chai Hu Long Gu Mu Li Wan	Bupleurum Dragonbone Oystershell Teapills	柴胡龙骨牡蛎丸	柴胡龍骨牡蠣丸	chái hú lóng gǔ mǔ lì wán
Chai Hu Shu Gan Wan	Bupleurum Sooth Liver Teapills	柴胡舒肝丸	柴胡舒肝丸	chái hú shū gān wán
Chai Hu Qing Gan Tang	Bupleurum Decoction to Clear the Liver	柴胡清肝汤	柴胡清肝湯	Chái Hú Qīng Gān Tāng
Chen Xiang Hua Qi Wan	Aquilaria Pills	沉香化气丸	沉香化氣丸	chén xiāng huà qì wán
Chuan Xin Lian Pian		穿心莲片	穿心蓮片	chuān xīn lián piàn
Chuan Xiong Wan	Ligusticum Teapills	川芎丸	川芎丸	chuān xiōng wán
Cong Rong Bu Shen Wan		苁蓉补肾丸	蓯蓉補腎丸	cōng róng bǔ shèn wán
Da Bu Yin Wan	Abundant Yin Teapills	大补阴丸	大補陰丸	dà bǔ yīn wán
Da Chai Hu Wan	Major Bupleurum Teapills	大柴胡丸	大柴胡丸	dà chái hú wán
Da Cheng Qi Tang	Major Order the Qi Decoction	大承气汤	大承氣湯	Dà Chéng Qì Tāng
Da Huang Jiang Zhi Wan	Rhubarb Teapills	大黄降脂丸	大黃降脂丸	dà huáng jiàng zhī wán
Dan Shen Huo Xue Wan	Quell the Surface Teapills	丹参活血丸	丹參活血丸	dān shēn huó xuè wán
Dan Shen Yin Wan	Salvia Teapills	丹参饮丸	丹參飲丸	dān shēn yǐn wán
Dang Gui Bu Xue Tang	Tangkuei Decoction to Tonify the Blood	当归补血汤	當歸補血湯	Dāng Guī Bŭ Xuè Tāng
Dang Gui Jing	Tang Kwei Gin	当归精	當歸精	dāng guī jīng
Dang Gui Liu Huang Tang	Tangkuei and Six-Yellow Decoction	当归六黄汤	當歸六黃湯	Dāng Guī Liù Huáng Tāng
Dang Gui Nian Tong Tang	Tangkuei Decoction to Lift the Pain	当归拈痛汤	當歸拈痛湯	Dāng Guī Niăn Tòng Tāng
Dang Gui Shao Yao San	Tangkuei and Peony Powder	当归芍药散	當歸芍藥散	Dāng Guī Sháo Yào Săn
Dang Gui Si Ni Tang		当归四逆丸	當歸四逆丸	dāng guī sìnì wán
Dang Gui Su Wan	Angelica Dang Gui Pills	当归素丸	當歸素丸	dāng guī sù wán
Dang Gui Wan	Angelica Dang Gui Teapills	当归丸	當歸丸	dāng guī wán
Dang Gui Yin Zi	Nourish the Surface Teapills	当归饮子丸	當歸飲子丸	dāng guī yǐn zǐ
Daochi Wan	Red Door Teapills	导赤丸	導赤丸	dǎochì wán
Ding Chuan Wan	Clear Mountain Air Teapills	定喘丸	定喘丸	dìng chuǎn wán
Du Huo Ji Sheng Wan	Solitary Hermit Teapills	独活寄生丸	獨活寄生丸	dú huó jì shēng wán
Du Zhong Pian	Eucommia Combination Tablets	杜仲片	杜仲片	dù zhòng piàn
Dun Sou San	Long-Bout Cough Powder	顿嗽散	頓嗽散	Dùn Sòu Săn
Er Chen Wan	Two Aged Pill	二陈丸	二陳丸	èr chén wán
Erlong Zuoci Wan		耳聋左慈丸	耳聾左慈丸	ěr lóng zuǒ cí wán
Er Xian Tang Wan	Two Immortals Teapills	二仙汤丸	二仙湯丸	èr xiān tāng wán
Er Zhi Wan	Two-Ultimate Pill	二至丸	二至丸	Èr Zhì Wán
Er Zhu Tang	Two-Atractylodes Decoction	二术汤	二朮湯	Èr Zhú Tāng
Fang Feng Tong Sheng Wan	Ledebouriella Sagely Unblocks Teapills	防风通圣丸	防風通聖丸	fáng fēng tōng shèng wán
Fang Ji Huang Qi Wan	Stephania & Astragalus Teapills	防己黄耆丸	防己黃耆丸	fáng jǐ huáng qí wán
Fu Fang Zhen Zhu An Chuang Wan	Margarite Acne Pills	复方珍珠暗疮丸	復方珍珠暗瘡丸	fù fāng zhēn zhū àn chuāng wán
Fu Ke Tong Jing Wan	Calm In The Sea Of Life Teapills	妇科通经丸	婦科通經丸	fù kē tōng jīng wán
Fu Ke Zhong Zi Wan		妇科种子丸	婦科種子丸	fù kē zhǒng zǐ wán
Fu Tu Dan	Poria and Cuscuta Special Pill	茯菟丹	茯菟丹	Fú Tù Dān
Fu Zi Li Zhong Wan		附子理中丸	附子理中丸	fù zǐ lǐ zhōng wán
Gan Lu Yin	Sweet Dew Decoction	甘露饮	甘露飲	Gān Lù Yĭn
Gan Mai Da Zao Wan	Calm Spirit Teapills	甘麦大枣丸	甘麥大棗丸	gān mài dà zǎo wán
Gan Mao Ling		感冒灵	感冒靈	gǎn mào líng
Ge Gen Huang Qin Huang Lian Tang	Kudzu, Coptis, and Scutellaria Decoction	葛根黄芩黄连汤	葛根黃芩黃連湯	Gĕ Gēn Huáng Qín Huáng Lián Tāng
Ge Gen Wan	Kudzu Teapills	葛根丸	葛根丸	gé gēn wán
Ge Jie Da Bu Wan	Gecko Great Tonic Teapills	隔界大补丸	隔界大補丸	gé jiè dà bǔ wán
Ge Xia Zhu Yu Wan	Stasis In The Lower Chamber Teapills	膈下逐瘀丸	膈下逐瘀丸	gé xià zhú yū wán
Gou Pi Gao	Dog Skin Plaster	狗皮膏	狗皮膏	gou pi gao
Gu Ben Wan		固本丸	固本丸	gù běn wán
Gua Lou Zhi Shi Tang	Trichosanthes Fruit and Immature Bitter Orange Decoction	瓜蒌枳实汤	瓜蒌枳實湯	Guā Lóu Zhĭ Shí Tāng
Guan Jie Yan Wan	Joint Inflammation Teapills	关节炎丸	關節炎丸	guān jié yán wán
Gui Pi Wan	Restore/Return to the Spleen Pill	归脾丸	歸脾丸	guī pí wán
Gui Ling Gao		龟苓膏	龜苓膏	guī líng gāo
Gui Qi Jian Zhong Tang	Tangkuei and Astragalus Decoction to Construct the Middle	归芪建中汤	歸耆建中湯	Guī Qí Jiàn Zhōng Tāng
Gui Zhi Fu Ling Wan	Cinnamon & Poria Teapills	桂枝茯苓丸	桂枝茯苓丸	guì zhī fú líng wán
Gui Zhi Tang	Cinnamon Twig Teapills	桂枝汤丸	桂枝湯丸	guìzhī tāng
Hai Ma Wan	Sea Horse Combination	海马丸	海馬丸	hǎi mǎ wán
Hu Qian Wan	Hidden Tiger Pill	虎潛丸	虎潜丸	Hŭ Qián Wán
Hua She Jie Yang Wan		花蛇解痒丸	花蛇解癢丸	huā shé jiě yǎng wán
Hua Zhi Ling Wan	Fargelin Pills	化痔灵丸	化痔靈丸	huà zhì líng wán
Huai Hua San	Sophora Japonica Flower Powder	槐花散		Huái Huā Săn
Huai Jiao Wan	Sophora Japonica Teapills	槐角丸	槐角丸	huái jiǎo wán
Huan Shao Dan	Return To Spring Teapills	还少丹	還少丹	huán shǎo dān
Huang Lian Jie Du Wan	Coptis Toxin-[= Toxic Heat/Fever]-Resolving Pills	黄连解毒丸	黃連解毒丸	huáng lián jiě dú wán (Huánglián Jiědú Wán)
Huang Lian Shang Qing Wan	Huang Lian Shang Ching Wan	黄连上清丸	黃連上清丸	huáng lián shàng qīng wán
Huang Lian Su Wan	Coptis Teapills	黄连素丸	黃連素丸	huáng lián sù wán
Huang Qi Jian Zhong Tang	Astragalus Decoction to Construct the Middle	黄芪建中汤	黃耆建中湯	Huáng Qí Jiàn Zhōng Tāng
Huo Luo Xiao Ling Wan	Red Vessel Teapills	活络效灵丸	活絡效靈丸	huó luò xiào líng wán
Huo Xiang Zheng Qi Shui	Agastache/Patchouli Qi-Righting Liquid	藿香正气水	藿香正氣水	huò xiāng zhèng qì shuǐ (Huòxiāng Zhèngqì Shuǐ)
Jiang Ya Pian		降压片	降壓片	jiàng yā piàn
Jian Pi Wan	Pill for Invigorating the Spleen	健脾丸	健脾丸	jiàn pí wán
Jiao Gu Lan Wan	Panta Teapills	胶股兰丸	膠股蘭丸	jiāo gǔ lán wán
Jia Wei Xiao Yao Wan	Free & Easy Wanderer Plus Teapills	加味逍遥丸	加味逍遙丸	jiā wèi xiāo yáo wán
Jie Geng Wan	Platycodon Teapills	桔梗丸	桔梗丸	jié gěng wán
Jie Jie Wan (Kai Kit Wan)	Reduce Prostate Swelling Pills	解结丸	解結丸	jiě jié wán
Ji Gu Cao Pian		鸡骨草片	雞骨草片	jī gǔ cǎo piàn
Jingu Dieshang Wan	Great Mender Teapills	筋骨跌伤丸	筋骨跌傷丸	jīngǔ diēshāng wán
Jin Gui Shen Qi Wan	Golden Book Teapills	金柜肾气丸	金柜腎氣丸	jīn guì shèn qì wán
Jin Suo Gu Jing Wan	Golden Lock Teapills	金锁固精丸	金鎖固精丸	jīn suǒ gù jīng wán
Jing Fang Bai Du Wan	Release The Exterior Teapills	荆放败毒丸	荊放敗毒丸	jīng fàng bài dú wán
Ji Sheng Ju He Wan		济生橘核丸	濟生橘核丸	jì shēng jú hé wán
Ju He Wan	Tangerine Seed Pill	橘核丸		Jú Hé Wán
Juan Bi Wan	Clear Channels Teapills	蠲痹丸	蠲痹丸	juān bì wán
Kang Gu Zeng Sheng Wan	Bone and Tendon Pills	抗骨增生丸	抗骨增生丸	kàng gǔ zēng shēng wán
Kang Ning Wan	Curing Pills	康宁丸	康寧丸	kāng níng wán
Li Zhong Wan	Regulate the Middle Pill	理中丸		Lĭ Zhōng Wán
Liang Ge Wan	Cool Valley Teapills	凉膈丸	涼膈丸	liáng gé wán
Lian Qiao Bai Du Pian		连翘败毒片	連翹敗毒片	lián qiáo bài dú piàn
Li Dan Pai Shi Pian		利胆排石片	利膽排石片	lì dǎn pái shí piàn
Li Fei Pian		利肺片	利肺片	lì fèi piàn
Ling Gui Zhu Gan Tang	Poria, Cinnamon Twig, Atractylodes Macrocephala, and Licorice Decoction	苓桂术甘汤	苓桂朮甘湯	Líng Guì Zhú Gān Tāng
Liu Jun Zi Wan	Six Gentlemen Teapills	六君子丸	六君子丸	liù jūn zǐ wán
Liu Wei Di Huang Wan	Six Flavor Teapills	六味地黄丸	六味地黃丸	liù wèi dì huáng wán
Long Dan Xie Gan Wan	Snake & The Dragon Teapills	龙胆泻肝丸	龍膽瀉肝丸	lóng dǎn xiè gān wán
Luo Bu Ma Pian		罗布麻片	羅布麻片	luó bù má piàn
Ma Huang Tang	Ephedra Decoction Pill	麻黄汤丸	麻黃湯丸	má huáng tāng
Ma Huang Xing Ren Gan Cao Shi Gao Tang	Ephedra, Apricot Kernel, Licorice, and Gypsum Decoction	麻黄杏仁甘草石膏汤	麻黃杏仁甘草石膏湯	Má Huáng Xìng Rén Gān Căo Shí Gāo Tāng
Mai Men Dong Tang	Ophiopogonis Decoction	麦门冬汤	麥門冬湯	Mài Mén Dōng Tāng
Ma Zi Ren Wan		麻子仁丸	麻子仁丸	má zǐ rén wán
Mai Wei Di Huang Wan	Eight Immortals Teapills	麦味地黄丸	麥味地黃丸	mài wèi dì huáng wán
Ming Mu Di Huang Wan		明目地黄丸	明目地黃丸	míng mù dì huáng wán
Mu Xiang Shun Qi Wan		木香顺气丸	木香順氣丸	mù xiāng shùn qì wán
Nei Xiao Luo Li Wan		内消漯厉丸	內消漯厲丸	nèi xiāo luo lì wán
Ning Sou Wan	Quiet Cough Teapills	宁嗽丸	寧嗽丸	níng sòu wán
Nu Ke Ba Zhen Wan	Women's Precious Teapills	女科八珍丸	女科八珍丸	nǚ kē bā zhēn wán
Ping Chuan Pian		平喘片	平喘片	píng chuǎn piàn
Ping Wei San Wan	Calm Stomach Teapills	平胃散丸	平胃散丸	píng wèi sǎn wán
Pu Ji Xiao Du Yin	Universal Benefit Teapills	普济消毒饮丸	普濟消毒飲丸	pǔ jì xiāo dú yǐn
Qi Bao Mei Ran Dan Wan	Seven Treasures For Beautiful Hair Teapills	七宝美髯丹丸	七寶美髯丹丸	qī bǎo měi rán dān wán
Qi Guan Yan Wan		气管炎丸	氣管炎丸	qì guǎn yán wán
Qi Ju Di Huang Wan	Lycii Chrysanthemum Teapills	杞菊地黄丸	杞菊地黃丸	qǐ jú dì huáng wán
Qi Ye Lian		七叶莲	七葉蓮	qī yè lián
Qian Jin Zhi Dai Wan	Chien Chin Chih Tai Wan	千金止带丸	千金止帶丸	qiān jīn zhǐ dài wán
Qiang Huo Sheng Shi Tang	Notopterygium root Decoction to Overcome Dampness	羌活胜湿汤	羌活勝濕湯	Qiāng Huó Shèng Shī Tāng
Qing Bi Tang	Clear the Nose Decoction	清鼻汤	清鼻湯	Qīng Bí Tāng
Qing Fei Pai Du Tang (aka. Qingfei Paidu Decotion)	Lung Detox Decoction	清肺排毒汤	清肺排毒湯	Qīng Fèi Pái Dú Tāng
Qing Fei Tang	Clear the Lung Decoction	清肺汤	清肺湯	Qīng Fèi Tāng
Qing Fei Yi Huo Wan	Ching Fei Yi Huo Wan	清肺抑火丸	清肺抑火丸	qīng fèi yì huǒ wán
Qing Gu Wan	Cool Bones Teapills	清骨丸	清骨丸	qīng gǔ wán
Qing Hao Bie Jia Tang	Artemisia Annua and Soft-Shelled Turtle Shell Decoction	青蒿鳖甲汤	青蒿鱉甲湯	Qīng Hāo Biē Jiă Tāng
Qing Qi Hua Tan Wan	Clean Air Teapills	清气化痰丸	清氣化痰丸	qīng qì huà tán wán
Qing Shang Fang Feng Tang	Clear the Upper and Guard the Wind Decoction	清上防风汤	清上防風湯	Qīng Shàng Fáng Fēng Tāng
Qing Shu Yi Qi Tang	Clear Summer-Heat and Augment the Qi Decoction	清暑益气汤	清暑益氣湯	Qīng Shŭ Yì Qì Tāng
Qing Wei San Wan		清胃散丸	清胃散丸	qīng wèi sǎn wán
Qing Xin Li Ge Tang	Clear the Epigastrium and Benefit the Diaphragm Decoction	清心利膈汤	清心利膈湯	Qīng Xīn Lì Gé Tāng
Qing Xin Lian Zi Yin	Lotus Seed Decoction to Clear the Heart	清心莲子饮	清心蓮子飲	Qīng Xīn Lián Zĭ Yĭn
Qing Zao Jiu Fei Tang	Eliminate Dryness and Rescue the Lung Decoction	清燥救肺汤	清燥救肺湯	Qīng Zào Jiù Fèi Tāng
Ren Shen Bai Du Wan	Resilient Warrior Teapills	人参败毒丸	人參敗毒丸	rén shēn bài dú wán
Ren Shen Yang Ying Tang	Ginseng Decoction to Nourish the Nutritive Qi	人参养荣汤	人參養榮湯	Rén Shēn Yăng Yíng Tāng
Run Chang Wan	Moisten the Intestines Pill	润肠丸	潤腸丸	Rùn Cháng Wán
San Bi Wan		三痹丸	三痹丸	sān bì wán
San Huang Xie Xin Tang	Three-Yellow Decoction to Sedate the Epigastrium	三黄泻心汤	三黃瀉心湯	Sān Huáng Xiè Xīn Tāng
San Miao Wan	Three Marvel Pill	三妙丸	三妙丸	sān miáo wán
San Zhong Kui Jian Tang	Disperse the Swelling and Break the Hardness Decoction	散肿溃坚汤	散腫潰堅湯	Sàn Zhŏng Kùi Jiān Tāng
Sang Ju Yin Wan	Clear Wind Heat Teapills	桑菊饮丸	桑菊飲丸	sāng jú yǐn
Sang Piao Xiao Wan	Mantis Cradle Teapills	桑螵蛸丸	桑螵蛸丸	sāng piāo xiāo
Sha Shen Mai Men Dong Wan	Autumn Rain Teapills	沙参麦门冬丸	沙參麥門冬丸	shā shēn mài mén dōng wán
Shao Fu Zhu Yu Wan	Stasis In The Lower Palace Teapills	少俯逐瘀丸	少俯逐瘀丸	shǎo fǔ zhú yū wán
Shao Yao Gan Cao Wan	Peony & Licorice Teapills	芍药甘草丸	芍藥甘草丸	sháo yào gān cǎo wán
Shao Yao Tang	Peony Decoction	芍药汤	芍藥湯	Sháo Yào Tāng
Shen Ling Bai Zhu Pian		参苓白术片	參苓白術片	shēn líng bái zhú piàn
Shen Qi Da Bu Wan		参耆大补丸	參耆大補丸	shēn qí dà bǔ wán
Shen Qi Wu Wei Zi Wan		参耆五味子丸	參耆五味子丸	shēn qí wǔ wèi zǐ wán
Shen Tong Zhu Yu Wan	Great Invigorator Teapills	身痛逐瘀丸	身痛逐瘀丸	shēn tòng zhú yū wán
Sheng Hua Tang		生化汤	生化湯	shēng huà tāng
Sheng Mai Wan	Great Pulse Teapills	生脉丸	生脈丸	shēng mài wán
Shi Quan Da Bu Wan	Ten Flavor Teapills	十全大补丸	十全大補丸	shí quán dà bǔ wán
Shi Hu Ye Guang Wan		石斛夜光丸	石斛夜光丸	shí hú yè guāng wán
Shi Liu Wei Liu Qi Yin	Sixteen-Ingredient Decoction to Flow Qi	十六味流气饮	十六味流氣飲	Shí Liù Wèi Liú Qì Yĭn
Shou Wu Wan		首乌丸	首烏丸	shǒu wū wán
Shou Wu Zhi	Shou Wu Essence	首乌汁	首烏汁	shǒu wū zhī
Shu Gan Wan	Soothe Liver Teapills	舒肝丸	舒肝丸	shū gān wán
Shu Jing Huo Xue Tang	Relax the Channels and Invigorate the Blood Decoction	疏经活血汤	疏經活血湯	Shū Jīng Huó Xuè Tāng
Sijunzi Tang Wan	Four Gentlemen Teapills	四君子汤丸	四君子湯丸	sì jūn zǐ tāng
Sì Miào Wán	Four Marvel Teapills	四妙丸	四妙丸	sì miào wán
Si Ni San	Four Pillars Teapills	四逆散丸	四逆散丸	sì nì sǎn wán
Si Wu Tang	Four Substances For Women	四物汤丸	四物湯丸	sì wù tāng
Suan Zao Ren Tang		酸枣仁汤片	酸棗仁湯片	suān zǎo rén tāng
Suo Quan Wan	Shut the Sluice Pill	缩泉丸	縮泉丸	Suō Quán Wán
Tao He Cheng Qi Tang	Peach Pit Decoction to Order the Qi	桃核承气汤	桃核承氣湯	Táo Hé Chéng Qì Tāng
Tao Hong Si Wu Tang		桃红四物汤丸	桃紅四物湯丸	táo hóng sì wù tāng
Tao Ren Wan / Runchang Wan	Peach Kernel Teapills	桃仁丸 / 润肠丸	桃仁丸 / 潤腸丸	táo rén wán / rùncháng wán
Tian Ma Gou Teng Yin		天麻勾藤饮丸	天麻勾藤飲丸	tiān má gōu téng yǐn
Tian Ma Mi Huan Su		天麻蜜环素	天麻蜜環素	tiān má mì huán sù
Tian Ma Wan		天麻丸	天麻丸	tiān má wán
Tian Qi Du Zhong Wan		田七杜仲丸	田七杜仲丸	tián qī dù zhòng wán
Tian Qi Wan		田七丸	田七丸	tián qī wán
Tian Tai Wu Yao Wan	Lindera Combination Teapills	天台乌药丸	天臺烏藥丸	tiān tái wū yào wán
Tian Wang Bu Xin Dan	Emperor's Teapills	天王补心丹	天王補心丹	tiān wáng bǔ xīn dān
Tong Jing Wan		痛经丸	痛經丸	tòng jīng wán
Tong Qiao Huo Xue Wan		通窍活血丸	通竅活血丸	tōng qiào huó xuè wán
Tong Shun Wan		通顺丸	通順丸	tōng shùn wán
Tong Xie Yao Fang Wan	Calm Wind Teapills	痛泻要方丸	痛瀉要方丸	tòng xiè yào fāng wán
Wei Ling Tang	Calm the Stomach and Poria Decoction	胃苓汤	胃苓湯	Wèi Líng Tāng
Wen Dan Tang	Rising Courage Teapills	温胆汤丸	溫膽湯丸	wēn dǎn tāng
Wen Jing Tang	Warm Cycle Teapills	温经汤丸	溫經湯丸	wēn jīng tāng
Wen Qing Yin	Warming and Clearing Decoction	温清饮	溫清飲	Wēn Qīng Yĭn
Wu Ji Bai Feng Wan	Wuchi Paifeng Wan	乌鸡白凤丸	烏雞白鳳丸	wū jī bái fèng wán
Wu Ling San		五苓散丸	五苓散丸	wǔ líng sǎn
Wu Mei Wan	Mume Pill	乌梅丸	烏梅丸	Wū Méi Wán
Wu Pi Yin	Five Peel Teapills	五皮饮丸	五皮飲丸	wǔ pí yǐn
Wu Ren Wan	Five Seed Teapills	五仁丸	五仁丸	wǔ rén wán
Wu Wei Xiao Du Wan	Five Flavor Teapills	五味消毒丸	五味消毒丸	wǔ wèi xiāo dú wán
Wu Zhu Yu Tang	Evodia Decoction	吴茱萸汤	吳茱萸湯	Wú Zhū Yú Tāng
Wu Zi Yan Zong Wan	Five Ancestors Teapills	五子衍宗丸	五子衍宗丸	wǔ zǐ yǎn zōng wán
Xiang Fu Wan		香附丸	香附丸	xiāng fù wán
Xiang Lian Wan	Aucklandia & Coptis Teapills	香莲丸	香蓮丸	xiāng lián wán
Xiang Sha Liu Jun Wan	Six Gentlemen Plus Teapills	香砂六君丸	香砂六君丸	xiāng shā liù jūn wán
Xiang Sha Ping Wei San	Cyperus and Amomum Powder to Calm the Stomach	香砂平胃散		Xiāng Shā Píng Wèi Săn
Xiang Sha Yang Wei Wan		香砂养胃丸	香砂養胃丸	xiāng shā yǎng wèi wán
Xiao Chai Hu Tang	Minor Bupleurum Decoction	小柴胡汤丸	小柴胡湯丸	xiǎo chái hú tāng
Xiao Cheng Qi Tang	Minor Order the Qi Decoction	小承气汤	小承氣湯	Xiăo Chéng Qì Tāng
Xiao Feng Wan	Great Windkeeper Teapills	消风丸	消風丸	xiāo fēng wán
Xiao Huo Luo Dan Wan		小活络丹丸	小活絡丹丸	xiǎo huó luò dān wán
Xiao Jian Zhong Wan	Minor Restore The Middle Teapills	小健中丸	小健中丸	xiǎo jiàn zhōng wán
Xiao Qing Long Wan	Minor Blue Dragon Teapills	小青龙丸	小青龍丸	xiǎo qīng lóng wán
Xiao Yao Wan	Free & Easy Wanderer Teapills	逍遥丸	逍遙丸	xiāo yáo wán
Xie Huang San	Drain the Yellow Powder	泻黄散	瀉黃散	Xiè Huáng Săn
Xin Yi Qing Fei Yin	Magnolia Decoction to Clear the Lung	辛夷清肺飲	辛夷清肺饮	Xīn Yí Qīng Fèi Yĭn
Xin Yi Wan	Magnolia Flower Teapills	辛夷丸	辛夷丸	xīn yí wán
Xuan Bi Wan		宣痹丸	宣痹丸	xuān bì wán
Xue Fu Zhu Yu Tang	Stasis In The Mansion Of Blood Teapills	血府逐瘀汤丸	血府逐瘀湯丸	xuè fǔ zhú yū tāng
Yan Hu Suo Zhi Tong Wan	Great Corydalis Teapills	延胡索止痛丸	延胡索止痛丸	yán hú suǒ zhǐ tòng wán
Yang Rong Wan		养荣丸	養榮丸	yǎng róng wán
Yang Xin Tang	Nourish the Heart Decoction	养心汤	養心湯	Yăng Xīn Tāng
Yang Ying Wan		养营丸	養營丸	yǎng yíng wán
Yao Tong Pian		腰痛片	腰痛片	yāo tòng piàn
Yi Gan San	Restrain the Liver Powder	抑肝散		Yì Gān Săn
Yi Guan Jian	Linking Decoction Teapills	一贯煎丸	一貫煎丸	yī guàn jiān
Yin Chen Hao Tang	Artemisia scoparia Decoction	茵陈蒿汤	茵陳蒿湯	Yīn Chén Hāo Tāng
Yinqiao Jiedu Wan	Yin Chiao Chieh Tu Wan	银翘解毒丸	銀翹解毒丸	yín qiáo jiě dú wán
Yin Qiao San	Honeysuckle and Forsythia Powder	银翘散	銀翹散	Yín Qiào Săn
You Gui Wan	Right Side Replenishing Teapills	右归丸	右歸丸	yòu guī wán
Yu Dai Wan		愈带丸	愈帶丸	yù dài wán
Yu Ping Feng San	Jade Screen Teapills	玉屏风散丸	玉屏風散丸	yù píng fēng sǎn
Yu Nu Jian	Jade Woman Decoction	玉女煎		Yù Nŭ Jiān
Yu Quan Wan	Jade Spring Teapills	玉泉丸	玉泉丸	yù quán wán
Yue Ju Wan	Escape Restraint Pill	越鞠丸		Yuè Jú Wán
Zhe Chong Yin	Break the Conflict Decoction	折冲饮	折衝飲	Zhé Chōng Yĭn
Zhen Gan Xi Feng Wan		镇肝息风丸	鎮肝息風丸	zhèn gān xī fēng wán
Zhen Wu Tang	True Warrior Teapills	真武汤丸	真武湯丸	zhēn wǔ tāng
Zheng Gu Zi Jin Dan	Purple and Gold Pill for Righteous Bones	正骨紫金丹	正骨紫金丹	Zhèng Gŭ Zĭ Jīn Dān
Zhi Bai Di Huang Wan	Eight Flavor Rehmannia Teapills	知柏地黄丸	知柏地黃丸	zhī bǎi dì huáng wán
Zhi Gan Cao	Pill of Honey-fried Liquorice Root	炙甘草丸	炙甘草丸	zhì gān cǎo
Zhi Sou San	Stop Coughing Powder	止嗽散	止嗽散	Zhĭ Sòu Săn
Zhong Gan Ling Pian	Important Emotion and Spirit Pill	重感灵片	重感靈片	zhòng gǎn líng piàn
Zhong Guo Tong Xue Pian	China Tung Hsueh Pills	中国通血片	中國通血片	zhōng guó tōng xuè piàn
Zhu Ling Tang	Polyporus Decoction	猪苓汤	豬苓湯	Zhū Líng Tāng
Zhu Ye Shi Gao Tang	Bamboo Leaves and Gypsum Decoction	竹叶石膏汤	竹葉石膏湯	Zhú Yè Shí Gāo Tāng
Zhui Feng Tou Gu Wan	Chui Feng Tou Gu Wan	追风透骨丸	追風透骨丸	zhuī fēng tòu gǔ wán
Zi Sheng Wan	Resources of Life Pill	资生丸	資生丸	zī shēng wán
Zi Yin Jiang Huo Tang	Nourish Yin and Descend the Fire Decoction	滋阴降火汤	滋陰降火湯	Zī Yīn Jiàng Huŏ Tāng
Zuo Jin Wan	Left Side Gold Pill	左金丸	左金丸	zuǒ jīn wán
Zuo Gui Wan	Bolus for Tonifying Kidney-yin	左归丸	左歸丸	zuǒ guī wán

== See also ==
- Kampo, Japanese adaptation of Chinese medicine
- Kampo list
- Traditional Chinese medicine
- Chinese patent medicine
