= Guipi Wan =

Brown honeyed pill used in Traditional Chinese medicine

Guipi Wan (simplified Chinese: 归脾丸; traditional Chinese: 歸脾丸) is a brown honeyed pill used in Traditional Chinese medicine to "invigorate the spleen function, nourish blood and cause sedation". It has a slight odor, and tastes sweet, and then slightly bitter and pungent. It is used where there is "deficiency syndrome of both the heart and the spleen marked by shortness of breath, cardiac palpitation, insomnia, dream-disturbed sleep, dizziness, lassitude, anorexia, excessive menstrual discharge or hematochezia".

== Chinese classic herbal formula of Guipi Wan ==
Name	Chinese (S)	Grams
Radix Codonopsis	党参	80
Rhizoma-Atractylodis Macrocephalae (stir-baked)	白术(炒)	160
Radix Astragali Preparata	炙黄芪	80
Radix Glycyrrhizae Preparata	炙甘草	40
Poria	茯苓	160
Radix Polygalae (processed)	远志(制)	160
Semen Ziziphi Spinosae (stir-baked)	酸枣仁(炒)	80
Arillus Longan	龙眼肉	160
Radix Angelicae Sinensis	当归	160
Radix Aucklandiae	木香	40
Fructus Jujubae (cored)	大枣	40

== See also ==
- Chinese classic herbal formula
- Bu Zhong Yi Qi Wan
