= Qianjin Zhidai Wan =

Greyish-black pill used in Traditional Chinese medicine

Qianjin Zhidai Wan (simplified Chinese: 千金止带丸; traditional Chinese: 千金止帶丸) is a greyish-black pill used in Traditional Chinese medicine to "restore vital energy, arrest excessive leukorrhea and regulate menstruation". Its odor is slightly aromatic. It tastes astringent and slightly bitter. It is used where there is "morbid leukorrhea and menstrual disorders with aching in the back and abdominal pain due to deficiency of spleen and kidney, imbalance of chong-ren and downward flow of damp-heat ".

== Chinese classic herbal formula ==
Name	Chinese (S)	Grams
Radix Codonopsis	党参	50
Rhizoma Atractylodis Macrocephalae (stir-baked)	白术 (炒)	50
Radix Angelicae Sinensis	当归	100
Radix Paeoniae Alba	白芍	50
Rhizoma Chuanxiong	川芎	100
Rhizoma Cyperi (processed with vinegar)	香附 (醋制)	200
Radix Aucklandiae	木香	50
Fructus Amomi	砂仁	50
Fructus Foeniculi (stir-baked with salt)	小茴香 (盐炙)	50
Rhizoma Corydalis (processed with vinegar)	延胡索 (醋制)	50
Cortex Eucommiae (stir-baked with salt)	杜仲 (盐炙)	50
Radix Dipsaci	续断	50
Fructus Psoraleae (stir-baked with salt)	补骨脂 (盐炒)	50
Flos Celosiae Cristatae	鸡冠苗	200
Indigo Naturalis	青黛	50
Cortex Ailanthi (stir-baked)	樗白皮 (炒)	200
Concha Ostreae (calcined)	牡蛎 (煅)	50

== See also ==
- Chinese classic herbal formula
- Bu Zhong Yi Qi Wan
