= Xianglian Wan =

Pill used in Traditional Chinese medicine

Xianglian Wan (simplified Chinese: 香连丸; traditional Chinese: 香蓮丸) is a pale yellow to yellowish brown pill used in Traditional Chinese medicine to "eliminate damp-heat, promote the flow of qi and relieve pain". It is slightly aromatic and tastes bitter. It is used when there are symptoms of "dysentery with tenesmus, abdominal pain and diarrhea". The binding agent of the pill is honey.

== Chinese classic herbal formula ==
Name	Chinese (S)	Grams
Rhizoma Coptidis (processed with Fructus Evodiae)	黄连 (吴茱萸)	800
Radix Aucklandiae	木香	200

== See also ==
- Chinese classic herbal formula
- Bu Zhong Yi Qi Wan
