= Huanglian Shangqing Wan =

Traditional Chinese medicine formula

Huanglian Shangqing Wan (simplified Chinese: 黄连上清丸; traditional Chinese: 黃連上清丸) is a blackish-brown pill used in Traditional Chinese medicine to "remove heat, ease constipation, dispel wind and relieve pain". It is aromatic, and it tastes bitter. It is used where there is "Wind-heat in the upper part of the body, vertigo and head distension, painful and swollen gums, sores in the mouth or tongue, swollen throat, ear-ache, tinnitus, congestive conjunctivitis, constipation, or dark urine". The binding agent is honey. Each pill weighs about 6 grams.

== Chinese classic herbal formula ==
Name	Chinese (S)	Grams
Rhizoma Coptidis	黄连	10
Fructus Gardeniae (processed with ginger)	栀子(姜制)	80
Fructus Forsythiae	连翘	80
Fructus Viticis (stir-baked)	蔓荆子(炒)	80
Radix Saposhnikoviae	防风	40
Spica Schizonepetae	荆芥穗	80
Radix Angelicae Dahuricae	白芷	80
Radix Scutellariae	黄芩	80
Flos Chrysanthemi	菊花	160
Herba Menthae	薄荷	40
Radix et Rhizoma Rhei (stir-baked with wine)	大黄 (酒炒)	320
Cortex Phellodendri (stir-baked with wine)	黄柏 (酒炒)	40
Radix Platycodonis	桔梗	80
Rhizoma Chuanxiong	川芎	40
Gypsum Fibrosum	石膏	40
Flos Inulae	旋复花	20
Radix Glycyrrhizae	甘草	40

== See also ==
- Chinese classic herbal formula
- Bu Zhong Yi Qi Wan
