= Shou Wu Chih =

Chinese Medicine

Shou Wu Chih (simplified Chinese: 首乌汁; traditional Chinese: 首烏汁; pinyin: Shǒu Wū Zhī) is a Chinese patent medicine that is claimed to provide health benefits.

== Use ==
Shou wu chih is claimed by the manufacturers, without evidence from any scientific studies, to increase energy levels, tone, warm, and invigorate the blood, nourish the liver and kidneys, benefit the eyes, and turn gray hair black. Other claims are that regular use may strengthen bones or tendons, or improve sleep.

Shou wu chih is sold as a liquid in glass bottles. It is recommended by the manufacturers to be consumed by adding between one and three tablespoons to a cup of hot water, tea, or soup.

== Production and export ==
Shou Wu Chih is produced in Guangzhou, Guangdong, China, under the brand name Yang Cheng. It is exported to other nations, including the United States.

Many Shou Wu tonics are produced in many cities in China and can be purchased at many pharmacy shops in China. Some health food stores in the United States import Shou Wu capsules and Shou Wu herb.

== Ingredients ==
- Prepared root of Polygonum multiflorum (bot.: Radix Polygoni Multiflori (Praeparata); Flowery Knotweed Root, Fleeceflower Root, or Climbing Knotwood; He Shou Wu or Fo-ti) - 25%
- Root of Angelica sinensis (bot.: Radix Angelicae Sinensis; Chinese Angelica Root; Dang Gui, Tang Kuei, or Dong Quai) - 25%
- Rhizome of Polygonatum sibiricum (bot.: Rhizoma Polygonati; Siberian Solomon's Seal, or King Solomon Seal Rhizome; Huang Jing) - 20%
- Rhizome of Rehmannia glutinosa (bot.: Radix Rehmanniae; Di Huang) - 10%
- Rhizome of Ligusticum chuanxiong (bot.: Rhizoma Chuanxiong; Szechuan Lovage Rhizome; Chuan Xiong) - 10%
- Root of Angelica dahurica (bot.: Radix Angelicae Dahuricae; Dahurian Angelica; Bai Zhi) - 7%
- Fruit of Amomum villosum (bot.: Fructus Amomi; Sha Ren) - 2%
- Clove - 1%

Other ingredients It may also include:

- Hedychium coronarium (white ginger)
- Jambosa caryophyllus Nied.
- Citron (Citrus medica)
- Conioselinum univittatum Turcz.

(Note: Fo-ti, though not actually a Chinese name, is commonly used in the US for products containing Polygonum.)

== See also ==
- Traditional Chinese medicine
- Chinese classic herbal formula
- Patent medicine
