= Xiangsha Liujun Wan =

Pale yellowish brown pill used in Traditional Chinese medicine

Xiangsha Liujun Wan (Chinese: 香砂六君丸) is a pale yellowish brown pill used in Traditional Chinese medicine to "replenish qi, invigorate the function of the spleen and regulate the function of the stomach". It is slightly aromatic and tastes pungent and slightly sweet. It is used when there are symptoms of "diminished function of the spleen with stagnation of qi marked by dyspepsia, belching, anorexia, epigastric and abdominal distension and loose bowels".

== Chinese classic herbal formula ==
Name	Chinese (S)	Grams
Radix Aucklandiae	木香	70
Fructus Amomi	砂仁	80
Radix Codonopsis	党参	100
Rhizoma Atractylodis Macrocephalae (stir-baked)	白术 (炒)	200
Poria	茯苓	200
Radix Glycyrrhizae Preparata	炙甘草	70
Pericarpium Citri Reticulatae	陈皮	80
Rhizoma Pinelliae (processed)	半夏 (炙)	100

== See also ==
- Chinese classic herbal formula
- Bu Zhong Yi Qi Wan
