= Xiangsha Yangwei Wan =

Pill used in Traditional Chinese medicine

Xiangsha Yangwei Wan (simplified Chinese: 香砂养胃丸; traditional Chinese: 香砂養胃丸) is a black pill with a dark brown core, and is used in Traditional Chinese medicine to "regulate the function of the stomach". It is slightly aromatic and tastes pungent and slightly bitter. It is used when there are symptoms of "anorexia, vomiting of acid fluid, epigastric distension and lassitude".

== Chinese classic herbal formula ==
| Name | Chinese (S) | Grams |
|---|---|---|
| Radix Aucklandiae | 木香 | 210 |
| Fructus Amomi | 砂仁 | 210 |
| Rhizoma Atractylodis Macrocephalae | 白术 | 300 |
| Pericarpium Citri Reticulatae | 陈皮 | 300 |
| Poria | 茯苓 | 300 |
| Rhizoma Pinelliae (processed) | 半夏 (炙) | 300 |
| Rhizoma Cyperi (processed with vinegar) | 香附 (醋) | 210 |
| Fructus Aurantii Immaturus (stir-baked) | 枳实 (炒) | 210 |
| Fructus Amomi Rotundus (peeled) | 白豆蔻 | 210 |
| Cortex Magnoliae Officinalis (processed with ginger) | 厚朴 (姜炙) | 210 |
| Herba Pogostemonis | 广藿香 | 210 |
| Radix Glycyrrhizae | 甘草 | 90 |

== See also ==
- Chinese classic herbal formula
- Bu Zhong Yi Qi Wan
