= Tongjing Wan =

Brownish-black pill used in Traditional Chinese medicine

Tongjing Wan (simplified Chinese: 痛经丸; traditional Chinese: 痛經丸) is a brownish-black pill used in Traditional Chinese medicine to "promote blood flow, 'dispel cold', regulate menstruation and relieve pain". It tastes slightly sweet and bitter. It is used where there is "abdominal pain during menstruation due to 'stagnation of blood by cold' ". Tongjing Wan is to be taken before menstruation.

== Chinese classic herbal formula ==
Name	Chinese (S)	Grams
Radix Angelicae Sinensis	当归	75
Radix Paeoniae Alba	白芍	50
Rhizoma Chuanxiong	川芎	37.5
Radix Rehmanniae Preparata	熟地黄	100
Rhizoma Cyperi (stir-baked with vinegar)	香附 (醋炒)	75
Radix Aucklandiae	木香	12.5
Pericarpium Citri Reticulatae Viride	青皮	12.5
Fructus Crataegi (carbonized)	山楂 (炭)	75
Rhizoma Corydalis	延胡索	50
Rhizoma Zingiberis Preparatum	炮姜	12.5
Cortex Cinnamomi	桂皮	12.5
Radix Salviae Miltiorrhizae	丹参	75
Fructus Leonuri	茺蔚子	25
Flos Carthami	红花	25
Herba Leonuri	益母草	300
Faeces Trogopterori (stir-baked with vinegar)	五灵脂 (醋炒)	50

== See also ==
- Chinese classic herbal formula
- Bu Zhong Yi Qi Wan
