= Kanggu Zengsheng Wan =

Pill used in Traditional Chinese medicine

Kanggu Zengsheng Wan (Chinese: 抗骨增生丸) is a black pill used in Traditional Chinese medicine to "nourish loins and kidney and strengthen the tendons and bones, activate blood circulation and qi flow, and to relieve pain ". It tastes sweet and slightly astringent.

It is used when there are symptoms of “hyperplastic spondylitis, cervical syndrome, or spur”. Each pill weighs about 3 grams, and the dosage varies from about 2-3 gram, two to three times a day.

== Chinese classic herbal formula ==
Name	Chinese (S)	Grams
Radix Rehmanniae Preparata	熟地黄	210
Herba Cistanches (steamed)	肉苁蓉 (蒸)	140
Rhizoma Cibotii (Processed with salt )	狗脊 (盐制)	140
Fructus Ligustri Lucidi (processed with salt)	女贞子 (盐制)	70
Herba Epimedii	淫羊藿	140
Caulis Spatholobi	鸡血藤	140
Semen Raphani (stir-baked)	莱菔子 (炒)	70
Rhizoma Drynariae	骨碎补	140
Radix Achyranthis Bidentatae	牛膝	140

== See also ==
- Chinese classic herbal formula
- Bu Zhong Yi Qi Wan
