= Biyan Pian =

Chinese herbal pill

Biyan Pian or Bi Yan Pian (Chinese: 鼻炎片) is a common Chinese herbal pill produced by different manufacturers. Some forms are sugar-coated. The core is typically brown. It is used in traditional Chinese medicine to "dispel wind and remove toxic heat from the nose". It is slightly aromatic in odor and bitter in taste. Ir is most often used to treat acute and chronic sinusitis and allergic rhinitis.

The ingredients of Biyan Pian vary, although most products are based on Cang Er Zi San (cang er zi - Xanthium fruit, xin yi hua - Magnolia flower, bai zhi - Angelica dahurica root, and bo he - Chinese mint leaf and stem) and contain two or more ingredients from this formula. These four herbs "release the exterior", decongest the head, dry phlegm, and alleviate headache. In addition, many formulations include jie geng - Platycodon root (a phlegm-resolving herb which guides the formula upward), zhi mu - Anemarrhena asphodeloides rhizome (a heat-clearing, fire-reducing herb which soothes and moistens hot, irritated membranes), wu wei zi - schizandra fruit (an astringent herb which restrains excessive secretions), jing jie - Schizonepeta flower and herb (a surface-releasing herb which opens the nasal passages and alleviates itching), lian qiao - forsythia fruit (a heat/toxin-eliminating herb which alleviates redness and swelling), and fang feng - Ledebouriella root (a surface-releasing herb which alleviates head pain and congestion).

In 2011, Health Canada issued a recall of a brand of Biyan Pian because of high levels of mercury. The levels were nearly ten times higher than the daily maximum set by Health Canada.

== See also ==
- Chinese classic herbal formula
- Bu Zhong Yi Qi Wan
