= Guangyuyuan =

Chinese traditional medicine brand

Guangyuyuan (Chinese: 广誉远), founded in 1541, is one of the oldest traditional Chinese medicine brands still in existence. The brand offers a wide range of medicinal products that can be classified into 8 categories: soft and hard capsules, pills, granules, powders, syrups, creams, and health wine. Its headquarters are located in the historic Qianmen area of Beijing which is within walking distance of Tiananmen Square. Guangyuyuan is listed on the Shanghai Stock Exchange under the name Guangyuyuan Chinese Herbal Medicine Co. Ltd. stock number 600771.

== Brand history ==
Throughout history Guangyuyuan has gone by several different names including: GuangShengHao Pharmacy, GuangShengJu, GuangShengWei, GuangShengYuan, Shanxi Traditional Chinese Medicine Factory, and Shanxi Guangyuyuan. The official name of the company listed on the Shanghai stock exchange is Guangyuyuan Chinese Herbal Medicine Co. Ltd.

In 2003, Xi’an Dongsheng Group, a pharmaceutical conglomerate, acquired Guangyuyuan. The acquisition allowed Guangyuyuan to expand further into scientific research and development of traditional Chinese medicine.

In 2006 Guangyuyuan was recognized officially by the Ministry of Commerce as a China Time Honored Brand”. In early 2006, the Ministry of Commerce of the People’s Republic of China conducted a review of “China Time-honored Brands”. Guangyuyuan was able to collect historic data and demonstrate its heritage as well as cultural significance. 430 brands were selected by the Ministry of Commerce to be named “China Time Honored Brands”. Guangyuyuan was the only pharmaceutical company from Shanxi Province to be recognized for this honor.

== Products ==
Guangyuyuan offers a wide range of medicinal products, classed into 8 categories: soft and hard capsules, pills, granules, powders, syrups, creams, and tonics.

Dingkun Dan, GuilingJi, Angong Niuhuang Wan, Niuhuang Qingxin Wan, Liuwei Dihuang Wan, and Wuji Baifeng Wan are among some of the most popular of the more than 100 Chinese medicines that have been sold for hundreds of years. Guangyuyuan upholds the traditional standards for selecting ingredients and preparing each batch of medicine, ensuring the spirit – as well as the integrity – of Chinese culture and traditional Chinese medicine is kept.
