= Dabuyin Wan =

Pill used in Traditional Chinese medicine

Dabuyin Wan (simplified Chinese: 大补阴丸; traditional Chinese: 大補陰丸) is a dark brownish-black water-honeyed pill used in Traditional Chinese medicine to "nourish yin and to lower fire". It is used in cases where there is "deficiency of yin accompanied with flaming-up of evil fire manifested by daily recurring fever, night sweating, cough, hemoptysis, tinnitus and seminal emission". It tastes bitter, slightly sweet and astringent.

== Chinese classic herbal formula ==
Name	Chinese (S)	Grams
Radix Rehmanniae Preparata	熟地黄	120
Rhizoma Anemarrhenae (stir-baked with salt)	知母 (炒)	80
Cortex Phellodendri (stir-baked with salt)	黄柏 (炒)	80
Carapax et Plastrum Testudinis (processed)	龟板 (制)	120
Medulla Spinalis Suis	猪椎	160

== See also ==
- Chinese classic herbal formula
- Bu Zhong Yi Qi Wan
