= Xiangfu Wan =

Pill used in traditional Chinese medicine

Xiangfu Wan (Chinese: 香附丸) is a dark yellow to dark brown pill used in Traditional Chinese medicine to "regulate the flow of qi and nourish blood". It is aromatic and tastes pungent, slightly sweet and slightly bitter. It is used when there is "stagnation of qi and deficiency of blood, marked by sensations of stuffiness in the chest, costal pain, abdominal pain during menstrual periods and menstrual disorders". The binding agent of the pill is honey.

== Chinese classic herbal formula ==
Name	Chinese (S)	Grams
Rhizoma Cyperi (processed with vinegar)	香附 (醋制)	300
Radix Angelicae Sinensis	当归	200
Rhizoma Chuanxiong	川芎	50
Radix Paeoniae Alba (stir-baked)	白芍 (炒)	100
Radix Rehmanniae Preparata	熟地黄	100
Rhizoma Atractylodis Macrocephalae (stir-baked)	白术 (炒)	100
Fructus Amomi	砂仁	25
Pericarpium Citri Reticulatae	陈皮	50
Radix Scutellariae	黄芩	50

== See also ==
- Chinese classic herbal formula
- Bu Zhong Yi Qi Wan
