= Sijunzi Tang Wan =

Brown pill used in Traditional Chinese medicine

Sijunzi Tang Wan (simplified Chinese: 四君子汤丸; traditional Chinese: 四君子湯丸) also called the Four Gentlemen, is a brown pill used in Traditional Chinese medicine to "replenish qi and invigorate the functions of the spleen". It tastes slightly sweet. It is used where there is "deficiency of qi of the spleen and stomach marked by anorexia and loose bowels". Sijunzi Tang Wan is the base for many spleen qi deficiency formulas in Traditional Chinese medicine.

== Chinese classic herbal formula ==
Name	Chinese (S)	Grams
Radix Codonopsis	党参	200
Rhizoma Atractylodes macrocephala (stir-baked)	白术 (炒)	200
Poria (Fu Ling)	茯苓	200
Radix Glycyrrhizae Preparata	炙甘草	100

== See also ==
- Chinese classic herbal formula
- Bu Zhong Yi Qi Wan
