= Anshen Buxin Wan =

Pill used in Traditional Chinese medicine

Anshen Buxin Wan (simplified Chinese: 安神补心丸; traditional Chinese: 安神補心丸) is a dark brown or sugar-coated pill used in Traditional Chinese medicine to "calm the spirit and tonify the heart". It acts as a sedative and has adaptogenic properties. It is used to nourish the heart and calm the nerves caused by "yin and blood deficiencies".

== Chinese classic herbal formula ==
Name	Chinese (S)	Grams
Radix Salviae Miltiorrhizae	丹参	300
Fructus Schisandrae Chinensis seu Fructus Schisandrae Sphenantherae (steamed)	五味子(蒸)	150
Rhizoma Acori Tatarinowii	石菖蒲	100
Decoctum Tranquilizici Concentratum		560

The Decoctum Tranquilizici Concentratum is a decoction of Cortex Albiziae (合欢皮), Semen Cuscutae (大豆菟丝子), Herba Ecliptae (旱莲草), Fructus Ligustri Lucidi (女贞子), Caulis Polygoni Multiflori (首乌藤), Radix Rehmanniae (生地黄) and Concha Margaritifera Usta (珍珠母).

== See also ==
- Chinese classic herbal formula
- Bu Zhong Yi Qi Wan
- Chaihu Shugan Wan
