= Lidan Paishi Pian =

Tablet used in Traditional Chinese medicine

Lidan Paishi Pian (simplified Chinese: 利胆排石片; traditional Chinese: 利膽排石片) is a sugar-coated tablet or film-coated tablet with a brown core, used in Traditional Chinese medicine to "remove damp-heat, increase the flow of bile and expel calculi". It tastes bitter and salty.

It is used when there are symptoms of "cholelithiasis, infection of the biliary tract, and cholecystitis".

A traditional Chinese doctor typically prescribes about 6 to 10 tablets for expelling calculi, and about 4 to 6 tablets for treating inflammation, twice a day.

== Chinese classic herbal formula ==
Name	Chinese (S)	Grams
Herba Lysimachiae	金钱草	250
Herba Artemisiae Scopariae	茵陈	250
Radix Scutellariae	黄芩	75
Radix Aucklandiae	木香	75
Radix Curcumae	郁金	75
Radix et Rhizoma Rhei	大黄	125
Semen Arecae	槟榔	125
Fructus Aurantii Immaturus (stir-baked with bran)	枳实 (麸炒)	50
Natrii Sulfas	芒硝	25
Cortex Magnoliae Officinalis (processed with ginger)	厚朴 (姜炙)	50

== See also ==
- Chinese classic herbal formula
- Bu Zhong Yi Qi Wan
