= Fuzi Lizhong Wan =

Pill used in Traditional Chinese medicine

Fuzi Lizhong Wan (Chinese: 附子理中丸) is a brownish-black pill used in Traditional Chinese medicine to "warm and reinforce the spleen and the stomach". It is slightly aromatic, and it tastes pungent and slightly sweet. It is used where there is "deficiency-cold syndrome of the spleen and stomach marked by cold sensation and pain in the epigastrium, vomiting, diarrhea and cold extremities".

== Chinese classic herbal formula ==
Name	Chinese (S)	Grams
Radix Aconiti Lateralis Preparata	附子	100
Radix Codonopsis	党参	200
Rhizoma Atractylodis Macrocephalae(stir-baked)	白术(炒)	150
Rhizoma Zingiberis	干姜	100
Radix Glycyrrhizae	甘草	100

== See also ==
- Chinese classic herbal formula
- Bu Zhong Yi Qi Wan
- Aconitum carmichaelii
