= Mingmu Dihuang Wan =

Traditional Chinese medicinal pill

Mingmu Dihuang Pills (simplified Chinese: 明目地黄丸; traditional Chinese: 明目地黃丸) is a blackish-brown pill used in Traditional Chinese medicine to "nourish yin of the liver and the kidney, and to improve eyesight". Its odor is slightly aromatic. It tastes sweet, bitter and astringent. It is used where there is "deficiency of yin of the liver and the kidney marked by dryness of the eye, photophobia, blurred vision and lacrimination during exposure to the wind". The binding agent is honey.

== Chinese classic herbal formula ==
Name	Chinese (S)	Grams
Radix Rehmanniae Preparata	熟地黄	160
Fructus Corni (processed)	山茱萸 (炙)	80
Cortex Moutan	牡丹皮	60
Rhizoma Dioscoreae	山药	80
Poria	茯苓	60
Rhizoma Alismatis	泽泻	60
Fructus Lycii	枸杞子	60
Flos Chrysanthemi	菊花	60
Radix Angelicae Sinensis	当归	60
Radix Paeoniae Alba	白芍	60
Fructus Tribuli	蒺藜	60
Concha Haliotidis (calcined)	石决明 (煅)	80

== See also ==
- Chinese classic herbal formula
- Bu Zhong Yi Qi Wan
- Chinese ophthalmology
