= Wuling San Wan =

Pill used in traditional Chinese medicine

Wuling San Wan (Chinese: 五苓散丸, Pīnyīn: Wǔlíng sǎn wán) is a blackish-brown pill used in traditional Chinese medicine to "invigorate the function of the kidney and cause diuresis". It is slightly aromatic and tastes slightly pungent. It is used where there is "oliguria, edema and abdominal distension accompanied by vomiting, diarrhea, dryness of the mouth but no desire for drink due to dysfunctional activity of bladder-qi, stagnation of endogenous hygrosyndrome inside the body". The binding agent of the pill is honey.

== Chinese classic herbal formula ==
Name	Chinese (S)	Grams
Poria	茯苓	180
Rhizoma Alismatis	泽泻	300
Polyporus	豬苓	180
Cortex Cinnamomi	桂皮	120
Rhizoma Atractylodis Macrocephalae (stir-baked)	白术 (炒)	180

== See also ==
- Chinese classic herbal formula
- Bu Zhong Yi Qi Wan
