= Bazheng Wan =

Chinese medicine product

Bazhen Wan (Chinese: 八珍丸) is a brownish-black pill used in Traditional Chinese medicine to "replenish qi and blood". It is slightly bitter and sweet in taste. It is used when there is "deficiency of both qi and blood with sallow complexion, anorexia, lack of strength and excessive menstrual discharge". A honey solution is used as a binding agent to make the pill.

== Chinese classic herbal formula ==
Name	Chinese (S)	Grams
Radix Codonopsis	党参	100
Rhizoma Atractylodis Macrocephalae (stir-baked)	白术 (炒)	100
Poria	茯苓	100
Radix Glycyrrhizae	甘草	50
Radix Angelicae Sinensis	当归	150
Radix Paeoniae Alba	白芍	100
Rhizoma Chuanxiong	川芎	75
Radix Rehmanniae Preparata	熟地黄	150

== See also ==
- Chinese classic herbal formula
- Bu Zhong Yi Qi Wan
