= Huoxiang Zhengqi Shui =

Liquid herbal formula

Huoxiang Zhengqi Shui (simplified Chinese: 藿香正气水; traditional Chinese: 藿香正氣水) is a liquid herbal formula used in Traditional Chinese medicine to "induce diaphoresis and clear away summer-heat, to resolve damp and regulate the function of the spleen and stomach". It tastes bitter and pungent. About 5ml to 10ml of this liquid formula is applied twice a day to symptoms such as "colds with accumulation of damp in the interior and summer-heat and dampness marked by headache, dizziness and feeling of heaviness in the head, sensation of stuffiness in the chest, distending pain in the epigastrium and abdomen, vomiting and diarrhea".

== Chinese classic herbal formula ==
| Name | Chinese (S) | Grams |
|---|---|---|
| Rhizoma Atractylodis | 苍术 | 160 |
| Pericarpium Citri Reticulatae | 陈皮 | 160 |
| Cortex Magnoliae Officinalis (processed with ginger) | 厚朴 (姜制) | 160 |
| Radix Angelicae Dahuricae | 白芷 | 240 |
| Poria | 茯苓 | 240 |
| Pericarpium Arecae | 大腹皮 | 240 |
| Rhizoma Pinelliae | 半夏 | 160 |
| Extractum Glycyrrhizae | 甘草浸膏 | 20 |
| Oleum Pogostemonis | 藿香油 | (1.6 ml) |
| Oleum Folii Perillae | 白苏叶油 | (0.8 ml) |

== See also ==
- Chinese classic herbal formula
- Bu Zhong Yi Qi Wan
