= Jianpi Wan =

Blackish-brown pill used in Traditional Chinese medicine

Jianpi Wan (Chinese: 健脾丸) is a blackish-brown pill used in Traditional Chinese medicine to "invigorate the spleen function and improve the appetite". It tastes slightly sweet and bitter. It is used where there is "weakness of the spleen and stomach marked by epigastric and abdominal distension, anorexia, and loose bowels". The binding agent is honey. Each pill weighs about 9 grams.

The original formula was first published in "Standards of Diagnosis and Treatment" (證治準繩 Zhèngzhì Zhǔnshéng) by Wáng Kěntáng (王肯堂) in 1602. It is known as the "Pill for Invigorating the Spleen".

== Chinese classic herbal formula ==
Name	Chinese (S)	Grams
Radix Codonopsis	党参	200
Rhizoma Atractylodis Macrocephalae (stir-baked)	白术 (炒)	300
Pericarpium Citri Reticulatae	陈皮	200
Fructus Aurantii Immaturus (stir-baked)	枳实 (炒)	200
Fructus Crataegi (stir-baked)	山楂 (炒)	150
Fructus Hordei Germinatus (stir-baked)	麦芽 (炒)	200

== See also ==
- Chinese classic herbal formula
- Bu Zhong Yi Qi Wan
