= Qingfei Yihuo Wan =

Pill used in Traditional Chinese medicine

Qingfei Yihuo Wan (Chinese: 清肺抑火丸) is a yellowish-brown honeyed pill used in Traditional Chinese medicine to "remove heat from the lungs, relieve cough, resolve phlegm and relax the bowels". It has a slight odor, and tastes bitter. It is used where there is "heat in the lung marked by cough, yellowish sticky phlegm, dryness of the mouth, sore throat and constipation".

== Chinese classic herbal formula of Qingfei Yihuo Wan ==
Name	Chinese (S)	Grams
Radix Scutellariae	黄芩	140
Fructus Gardeniae	栀子	80
Rhizoma Anemarrhenae	知母	60
Bulbus Fritillariae thunbergii	浙贝母	90
Cortex Phellodendri	黄柏	40
Radix Sophorae flavescentis	苦参	60
Radix Platycodonis	桔梗	80
Radix Peucedani	前胡	40
Radix Trichosanthis	天花粉	80
Radix et Rhizoma Rhei	大黄	120

== See also ==
- Chinese classic herbal formula
- Bu Zhong Yi Qi Wan
