= Zuojin Wan =

Pill used in traditional Chinese medicine

Zuojin Wan (Chinese: 左金丸) is a yellowish-brown pill used in Traditional Chinese medicine to "quench liver-fire, regulate the stomach function and relieve pain". Indications include an "attack of the stomach by liver-fire marked by epigastric and hypochondriac pain, bitterness in the mouth, heartburn and acid regurgitation, and a dislike for hot drinks".

== Chinese classic herbal formula ==
Name	Chinese	Grams
Rhizoma Coptidis	黄连	600
Fructus Evodiae	吴茱萸	100

== See also ==
- Chinese classic herbal formula
- Bu Zhong Yi Qi Wan
