= Siwu Tang Wan =

Brownish-black pill used in Traditional Chinese medicine

Siwu Tang Wan (simplified Chinese: 四物汤丸; traditional Chinese: 四物湯丸) is a brownish-black pill used in traditional Chinese medicine to "normalize menstruation and enrich blood". It is aromatic and tastes slightly sweet and bitter. It is used where there is "deficiency of blood, and irregular menstruation". The name Siwu Tang Wan literally means Pill of Four Substances in Chinese.

== Chinese classic herbal formula ==
Name	Chinese (S)	Grams
Radix Angelicae Sinensis	当归	250
Rhizoma Chuanxiong	川芎	250
Radix Paeoniae Alba	白芍	250
Radix Rehmanniae Preparata	熟地黄	250

== See also ==
- Chinese classic herbal formula
- Bu Zhong Yi Qi Wan
