= Chenxiang Huaqi Wan =

Pill used in traditional Chinese medicine

Chenxiang Huaqi Wan (simplified Chinese: 沉香化气丸; traditional Chinese: 沉香化氣丸) is a greyish-brown to yellowish-brown pill used in Traditional Chinese medicine to "regulate the flow of qi in the liver and the stomach, and to remove the retention of undigested food". It is used in cases where there is "stagnation of qi in the liver and the stomach marked by distending pain in the epigastrium, feeling of stuffiness and fullness in the chest, anorexia, belching and acid regurgitation". It is aromatic in odour and tastes slightly sweet and bitter.

== Chinese classic herbal formula ==
Name	Chinese (S)	Grams
Lignum Aquilariae Resinatum	沉香	25
Radix Aucklandiae	木香	50
Herba Pogostemonis	广藿香	100
Rhizoma Cyperi (processed with vinegar)	香附 (醋)	50
Fructus Amomi	砂仁	50
Pericarpium Citri Reticulatae	陈皮	50
Rhizoma Curcumae (processed with vinegar)	莪术 (醋)	100
Massa Medicata Fermentata (stir-baked)	神曲 (炒)	100
Fructus Hordei Germinatus (stir-baked)	麦芽 (炒)	100
Radix Glycyrrhizae	甘草	50

== See also ==
- Chinese classic herbal formula
- Bu Zhong Yi Qi Wan
