= Daochi Wan =

Pill used in Traditional Chinese medicine

Daochi Wan (simplified Chinese: 导赤丸; traditional Chinese: 導赤丸) is a blackish-brown honeyed pill used in Traditional Chinese medicine to "remove heat, quench fire, relieve dysuria and to relax bowels". It is used in cases where there are "ulcers in the mouth or on the tongue, sore throat, fidgetness and distress in the chest, micturition of small amount of red urine, and constipation due to virulent-internal-heat". It tastes sweet and bitter.

== Chinese classic herbal formula ==
Name	Chinese (S)	Grams
Fructus Forsythiae	连翘	120
Rhizoma Coptidis	黄连	60
Fructus Gardeniae (stir-baked with ginger)	栀子 (姜炒)	120
Caulis Aristolochiae Manshuriensis	关木通	60
Radix Scrophulariae	玄参	120
Radix Trichosanthis	天花粉	120
Radix Paeoniae Rubra	赤芍	60
Radix et Rhizoma Rhei	大黄	60
Radix Scutellariae	黄芩	120
Talcum	滑石	120

== See also ==
- Chinese classic herbal formula
- Bu Zhong Yi Qi Wan
