= Tian Wang Bu Xin Dan =

Chinese classical herbal formula

Tian Wang Bu Xin Dan, also known as Tianwang buxin teapills (simplified Chinese: 天王补心丹; traditional Chinese: 天王補心丹; pinyin: tiānwáng bǔxīn dān), is a Chinese classic herbal formula. It is commonly made into Chinese patent medicine.

== Variations ==
There are about 9 common prescription variations using the same name. One such formula is found in Volume 6 of "Revised Fine Formulas for Women" (校注妇人良方 jiào zhù fùrén liáng fāng) by Bi Li-zhai (c. 1529 CE).

The formula was created by Hóng Jī (T: 洪基, S: 洪基). It was published in "Secret Investigations into Obtaining Life" (shè shēng mì pōu, T: 攝生秘剖, S: 摄生秘剖) in 1638.

There are many variations of the formula proportions. Each maker of Chinese patent medicine changes the proportions of the herbs slightly. Some herbs may be changed also. For example, rén shēn (ginseng root) may be replaced with dǎng shēn ("poor man's ginseng"). The original formula instructed that the pills be coated with zhū shā (朱砂) (Cinnabar), which is banned by the FDA in the US. It is usually omitted entirely from the formulation or replaced with a substitute.

== Chinese classic herbal formula ==
Name	Common Name	Pinyin	Chinese (T)	Chinese (S)	Katakana	Kanji	Vietnamese	Genus species	%
Rehmanniae Radix	Chinese foxglove root	shú dì huáng	熟地黃	熟地黄	ジオウ	地黄	Sinh địa	Rehmannia glutinosa	29.6%
Angelicae Radix	Chinese angelica root	dāng guī	當歸	当归	トウキ	当帰	Đương quy	Angelica sinensis	7.4%
Schisandrae Fructus	schisandra fruit	wǔ wèi zǐ	五味子	五味子	ゴミシ	五味子	Ngũ vị tử	Schisandra chinensis	7.4%
Zizyphi Spinosi Semen	jujube seed, Chinese date seed	suān zǎo rén	酸棗仁	酸枣仁	サンソウニン	酸棗仁	Táo nhân	Ziziphus zizyphus	7.4%
Biota Semen	Biota tree seed	bái zǐ rén	柏子仁	柏子仁	コノテガシワ	側柏	Bá tử nhân	Platycladus orientalis	7.4%
Asparagi Radix	asparagus root	tiān mén dōng	天門冬	天门冬	テンモンドウ	天門冬	Thiên môn đông	Asparagus cochinchinensis	7.4%
Ophiopogonis Rhizoma	mondo grass rhizome	mài mén dōng	麥門冬	麦门冬	バクモンドウ	麦門冬	Mạch môn	Ophiopogon japonicus	7.4%
Scrophularia Radix	Ningpo figwort root	xuán shēn	玄參	玄参	ゲンジン	玄参	Huyền sâm	Scrophularia ningpoensis	7.4%
Polygalae Radix	milkwort root, snakeroot	yuǎn zhì	遠志	远志	オンジ	遠志	Viễn chí	Polygala tenuifolia	3.7%
Salvia Radix	Chinese sage root	dān shēn	丹參	丹参	タンジン	丹参	Đan sâm	Salvia miltiorrhiza	3.7%
Codonopsis Radix	poor man's ginseng root	dǎng shēn	黨參	党参	トウジン	党参	Đảng sâm	Codonopsis pilosula	3.7%
Poria	tuckahoe mushroom	fú líng	茯苓	茯苓	ブクリョウ	茯苓	Bạch linh	Poria cocos	3.7%
Platycodi Radix	Chinese bellflower root, balloon flower root	jié gěng	桔梗	桔梗	キキョウ	桔梗	Cát cánh	Platycodon grandiflorum	3.7%

== See also ==
- Chinese classic herbal formula
- Chinese patent medicine
