= Shouwu Wan =

Pill used in Traditional Chinese medicine

Shouwu Wan (simplified Chinese: 首乌丸; traditional Chinese: 首烏丸) is a black pill used in Traditional Chinese medicine to "replenish the liver and the kidney, strengthen the tendons and bones, and blacken the hair". It tastes sweet and slightly bitter. It is used where there is "deficiency syndrome of the liver and the kidney marked by dizziness, blurring of vision, tinnitus, aching of the loins, numbness of limbs and premature greying of hair and beard, and hyperlipemia". The binding agent is honey.

== Chinese classic herbal formula ==
Name	Chinese (S)	Grams
Radix Polygoni Multiflori Preparata	制何首乌	360
Radix Rehmanniae	生地黄	20
Radix Achyranthis Bidentatae (processed with wine)	牛膝 (酒制)	40
Fructus Mori	桑椹	182
Fructus Ligustri Lucidi (processed with wine)	女贞子 (酒制)	40
Herba Ecliptae	旱莲草	235
Folium Mori (processed)	桑叶 (炙)	40
Semen Sesami Nigrum	黑芝麻	16
Semen Cuscutae (processed with wine)	大豆菟丝子 (酒制)	80
Fructus Rosae Laevigatae	金樱子	259
Fructus Psoraleae (processed with salt)	补骨脂 (盐制)	40
Herba Siegesbeckiae (processed)	僿莶草 (炙)	80
Flos Lonicerae (processed)	金银花 (炙)	20

== See also ==
- Chinese classic herbal formula
- Bu Zhong Yi Qi Wan
