= Fuke Tongjing Wan =

Pill used in Traditional Chinese medicine

Fuke Tongjing Wan (simplified Chinese: 妇科通经丸; traditional Chinese: 婦科通經丸) is a vermillion waxed pill with yellowish-brown core used in Traditional Chinese medicine to "remove blood stasis and emmenagogue, to alleviate mental depression, and to relieve pain". It tastes slightly salty. It is used where there is "dysmenorrhea, amenorrhea, distension in the chest and diaphragm, distension and pain at loins and abdomen due to the stagnation of qi and blood". It is typically taken with millet soup or yellow rice wine in the morning before breakfast, and is contraindicated in pregnancy and in patients with amenorrheal abdominalgia or loose stool due to deficiency in qi and blood.

== Chinese classic herbal formula ==
Name	Chinese (S)	Grams
Fructus Crotonis (processed)	巴豆 (炙)	80
Resina Toxicodendri (carbonized)	干漆 (炭)	160
Rhizoma Cyperi (stir-baked with vinegar)	香附 (醋炒)	200
Flos Carthami	红花	225
Radix et Rhizoma Rhei (stir-baked with vinegar)	大黄 (醋炒)	160
Lignum Aquilariae Resinatum	沉香	163
Radix Aucklandiae	木香	225
Rhizoma Curcumae (boiled with vinegar)	莪术 (醋熬)	163
Rhizoma Sparganii (stir-baked with vinegar)	三棱 (醋炒)	163
Radix Curcumae	郁金	163
Radix Scutellariae	黄芩	163
Folium Artemisiae Argyi (carbonized)	艾叶 (炭)	75
Carapax Trionycis (processed with vinegar)	鳖甲 (醋制)	163
Sal Ammoniaci (processed with vinegar)	硇砂 (醋制)	100
Squama Manis (processed with vinegar)	穿山甲 (醋制)	163

== See also ==
- Chinese classic herbal formula
- Bu Zhong Yi Qi Wan
