= Erlong Zuoci Wan =

Pill used in Traditional Chinese medicine

Erlong Zuoci Wan (simplified Chinese: 耳聋左慈丸; traditional Chinese: 耳聾左慈丸) is a brownish-black honeyed pill used in Traditional Chinese medicine to "replenish the kidney and subdue hyperactivity of the liver". It is used in cases where there is "deficiency of yin of the liver and the kidney marked by tinnitus, impairment of hearing, dizziness and blurred vision". It is sweet and slightly sour in taste.

== Chinese classic herbal formula ==
| Name | Chinese (S) | Grams |
|---|---|---|
| Magnetitum (calcined) | 磁石(煅) | 20 |
| Radix Rehmanniae Preparata | 熟地黄 | 160 |
| Fructus Corni (processed) | 山茱萸 (制) | 80 |
| Cortex Moutan | 牡丹皮 | 60 |
| Rhizoma Dioscoreae | 山药 | 80 |
| Poria | 茯苓 | 60 |
| Rhizoma Alismatis | 泽泻 | 60 |
| Radix Bupleuri Marginati | 竹叶柴胡 | 20 |

== See also ==
- Chinese classic herbal formula
- Bu Zhong Yi Qi Wan
