= Tianma Wan =

Pill in Traditional Chinese medicine

Tianma Wan (Chinese: 天麻丸) is a blackish-brown pill used in Traditional Chinese medicine to "relieve rheumatism, alleviate muscle contracture, remove obstructions from collaterals and channels, promote blood circulation and relieve pain." It is slightly aromatic and tastes slightly sweet and bitter. It is used where there is a "deficiency of liver and kidney, stagnation of wind-damp marked by muscle contracture and numbness of the limbs, aching in the loins and legs." The binding agent of the pill is honey.

== Chinese classic herbal formula ==
Name	Chinese (S)	Grams
Rhizoma Gastrodiae	天麻	60
Rhizoma et Radix Notopterygii	羌活	100
Radix Angelicae Pubescentis	独活	50
Cortex Eucommiae (stir-baked with salt)	杜仲 (盐炙)	70
Radix Achyranthis Bidentatae	牛膝	60
Rhizoma Dioscoreae Hypoglaucae	山药	60
Radix Aconiti Lateralis (processed)	生附子 (炙)	10
Radix Angelicae Sinensis	当归	100
Radix Rehmanniae	生地黄	160
Radix Scrophulariae	玄参	60

== See also ==
- Chinese classic herbal formula
- Bu Zhong Yi Qi Wan
