= Chaihu Shugan Wan =

Pill used in traditional Chinese medicine

Chaihu Shugan Wan (Chinese: 柴胡舒肝丸) is a blackish-brown honeyed pill used in Traditional Chinese medicine to "disperse stagnated liver-qi, to activate the flow of qi, to relieve distension and pain". It is used in cases where there is "stagnation of liver qi, distension of chest and hypochondria, indigestion, and acid eructation".

== Chinese classic herbal formula ==
Name	Chinese (S)	Grams
Poria	茯苓	100
Fructus Aurantii (stir-baked)	枳壳 (炒)	50
Fructus-Amomi Rotundus	白豆蔻	40
Radix Paeoniae Alba (stir-baked with wine)	白芍 (酒炒)	50
Radix Glycyrrhizae	甘草	50
Rhizoma Cyperi (processed with vinegar)	香附 (醋制)	75
Pericarpium Citri Reticulatae	陈皮	50
Radix Platycodi	桔梗	50
Cortex Magnoliae Officinalis (processed with ginger)	厚朴 (姜制)	50
Fructus Crataegi (stir-baked)	山楂 (炒)	50
Radix Saposhnikoviae	防风	50
Massa Medicata Fermentata (stir-baked)	神曲 (炒)	50
Radix Bupleuri	柴胡	75
Radix Scutellariae	黄芩	50
Herba Menthae	薄荷	50
Caulis Perillae	白苏梗	75
Radix Aucklandiae	木香	25
Semen Arecae (stir-baked)	槟榔 (炒)	75
Rhizoma Sparganii (processed with vinegar)	三棱 (醋制)	50
Radix et Rhizoma Rhei (stir-baked with wine)	大黄 (酒炒)	50
Pericarpium Citri Reticulatae Viride (stir-baked)	青皮 (炒)	50
Radix Angelicae Sinensis	当归	50
Rhizoma Pinelliae (processed with ginger)	半夏 (姜制)	75
Radix Linderae	乌药	50
Rhizoma Curcumae (processed)	莪术 (制)	50

== See also ==
- Chinese classic herbal formula
- Bu Zhong Yi Qi Wan
