= Shaofu Zhuyu Wan =

Blackish-brown pill used in Traditional Chinese medicine

Shaofu Zhuyu Wan (Chinese: 少腹逐瘀丸) is a blackish-brown pill used in Traditional Chinese medicine to "promote blood flow, remove blood stasis, dispel cold and relieve pain". It is aromatic and tastes pungent and bitter. It is used in cases of "menstrual disorder caused by blood stasis together with cold, accompanied by distension and pain in the lower abdomen, lumbago and leukorrhea". The binding agent is honey.

== Chinese classic herbal formula ==
Name	Chinese (S)	Grams
Radix Angelicae Sinensis	当归	300
Pollen Typhae	蒲黄	300
Faeces Trogopterori (stir-baked with vinegar)	五灵脂 (醋炒)	200
Radix Paeoniae Rubra	赤芍	200
Fructus Foeniculi (stir-baked with salt)	小茴香 (盐炒)	100
Rhizoma Corydalis (processed with vinegar)	延胡索 (醋制)	100
Myrrha (stir-baked)	没药 (炒)	100
Rhizoma Chuanxiong	川芎	100
Cortex Cinnamomi	桂皮	100
Rhizoma Zingiberis Preparatum	炮姜	20

== See also ==
- Chinese classic herbal formula
- Bu Zhong Yi Qi Wan
