= Shengmai Wan =

Pill used in Traditional Chinese medicine

Shengmai Wan (simplified Chinese: 生脉丸; traditional Chinese: 生脈丸) is a brown pill used in Traditional Chinese medicine to "replenish qi, restore normal pulse, nourish yin and promote the production of body fluids". It is aromatic and tastes sour, sweet and slightly bitter. It is used where there is "deficiency of qi and yin marked by cardiac palpitation, shortness of breath, scarcely perceptible pulse and spontaneous sweating".

== Chinese classic herbal formula ==
Name	Chinese (S)	Grams
Radix Ginseng	人参	100
Radix Ophiopogonis	麦冬	200
Fructus Schisandrae Chinensis seu Fructus Schisandrae Sphenantherae	五味子	100

== See also ==
- Chinese classic herbal formula
- Bu Zhong Yi Qi Wan
