= Maiwei Dihuang Wan =

Pill used in Traditional Chinese medicine

Maiwei Dihuang Wan (simplified Chinese: 麦味地黄丸; traditional Chinese: 麥味地黃丸) is a blackish-brown pill used in Traditional Chinese medicine to "nourish the kidney to receive qi". It tastes slightly sweet and sour.

It is "contraindicated in children under 13 years old, pregnant women, weak persons and patients with heart disease, severe tracheitis and hypertension". In addition, this pill is "unsuitable for long term use", and "overdosage is strongly discouraged". Each pill weighs about 0.6 grams.

Patients taking this pill should "abstain from eating uncooked and cool foods".

Mai Wei Di Huang Wan is erroneously described as being contraindicated for pregnant women. There are no herbs in it which are contraindicated for pregnancy. It is safe and can be useful for pregnant or nursing women.

A combination of soy isoflavones (types of plant-derived phytoestrogens) and Liu Wei Di Huang Wan (from which Maiwei Dihuang Wan is derived) is potentially effective for postmenopausal women with severe vasomotor episodes (often referred to as "hot flashes") as an alternative to hormonal therapy.

== Chinese classic herbal formula ==
Name	Chinese (S)	Grams
Radix Ophiopogonis	麦冬	60
Fructus Schisandrae Chinensis seu Fructus Schisandrae Sphenantherae	五味子	40
Radix Rehmanniae Preparata	熟地黄	160
Fructus Corni (processed)	山茱萸(炙)	80
Cortex Moutan	牡丹皮	60
Rhizoma Dioscoreae	山药	80
Poria	茯苓	60
Rhizoma Alismatis	泽泻	60

== See also ==
- Chinese classic herbal formula
- Bu Zhong Yi Qi Wan
