= Sheng Hua Tang =

Chinese classic herbal formula

Sheng Hua Tang (simplified Chinese: 生化汤; traditional Chinese: 生化湯; pinyin: shēng huà tāng) is a Chinese classic herbal formula that stimulates blood flow and relieves pain. The herbal formula is widely used by Chinese women who after giving birth will use the formula to improve blood flow. According to the Taoist Center, this formula is the most popular post-partum formula to restore blood flow.

== Ingredients ==
- 24g of Dang Gui (Angelicae sinensis root)
- 9g of Chuan Xiong (Ligusticum chuanxiong root)
- 6-9g of Tao Ren (Prunus persica kernel)
- 1.5g of Pao Jiang (blast fried Zingiber officinale root)
- 1.5g of Zhi Gan Cao (honey fried Glycyrrhiza uralensis root)

== See also ==
- Chinese classic herbal formula
- Chinese patent medicine
