= Guizhi Fuling Wan =

Brown pill used in Traditional Chinese medicine

Guizhi Fuling Wan (Chinese: 桂枝茯苓丸) is a brown pill used in Traditional Chinese medicine to "activate blood circulation, to remove blood stasis and mass in the abdomen". It is sweet in taste. It is used where there are symptoms such as "masses in the abdomen of women, amenorrhea due to blood stasis, menses with bellyache, or persistent lochia after delivery". In clinical practice, medical scientists have discovered that Gui Zhi Fu Ling Wan can also treat some internal medical diseases and male diseases. Honey is used as the binding agent, and each pill weighs about 6 grams.

== History ==
Guizhi Fuling Wan has a history of more than 1,800 years, and its inventor is Zhang Zhongjing.

== Chinese classic herbal formula ==
Name	Chinese (S)	Grams
Ramulus Cinnamomi	桂枝	100
Poria	茯苓	100
Cortex moutan	牡丹皮	100
Radix Paeoniae Rubra	赤芍	100
Semen Persicae	桃仁	100

== See also ==
- Chinese classic herbal formula
- Bu Zhong Yi Qi Wan
- Zhang Zhongjing
