= Wuji Baifeng Wan =

Pill used in Traditional Chinese medicine

Wuji Baifeng Wan (simplified Chinese: 乌鸡白凤丸; traditional Chinese: 烏雞白鳳丸) is a blackish-brown pill used in Traditional Chinese medicine to "replenish qi and blood, regulate menstruation and arrest excessive leukorrhea". It is slightly aromatic and tastes sweet and slightly bitter. It is used in cases where there is "deficiency of both qi and blood marked by emaciation and general feebleness, aching and limpness of loins and knees, disorders of menstruation with abnormal uterine bleeding and excessive leukorrhea". The binding agent of the pill is honey. The word Wuji Baifeng Wan translates to: Black Chicken White Phoenix Pill.

== Chinese classic herbal formula ==
| Latin name | Chinese (S) | Pinyin | English | Grams |
|---|---|---|---|---|
| Pullus cum Osse Nigro (with feathers, claws and intestines removed) | 乌鸡 | Wu Ji | Dark-boned and dark-skinned chicken | 640 |
| Colla Cornus Cervi | 鹿角胶 | Lu Jiao Jiao | Deer antler glue | 128 |
| Carapax Trionycis | 鳖甲 (炙) | Bie Jia (Zhi) | Tortoise shell (dorsal side) (processed) | 64 |
| Concha Ostreae | 牡蛎 (煅) | Mu Li (Duan) | Oyster shell (calcined) | 48 |
| Ootheca Mantidis | 桑螵蛸 | Sang Piao Xiao | Mantis egg case | 48 |
| Radix Ginseng | 人参 | Ren Shen | Ginseng root | 128 |
| Radix Astragali | 黄芪 | Huang Qi | Astragalus root | 32 |
| Radix Angelicae Sinensis | 当归 | Dang Gui | Chinese angelica root | 144 |
| Radix Paeoniae Alba | 白芍 | Bai Shao | White peony (peeled root) | 128 |
| Rhizoma Cyperi | 香附 (醋制) | Xiang Fu | Cyperus rhizome (processed with vinegar) | 128 |
| Radix Asparagi | 天冬 | Tian Men Dong | Asparagus root | 64 |
| Radix Glycyrrhizae | 甘草 | Gan Cao | Chinese liquorice root | 32 |
| Radix Rehmanniae | 生地黄 | Sheng Di Huang | Rehmannia root | 256 |
| Radix Rehmanniae Preparata | 熟地黄 | Shu Di Huang | Rehmannia root, st | 256 |
| Rhizoma Chuanxiong | 川芎 | Chuan Xiong | Chuanxiong rhizome | 64 |
| Radix Stellariae | 银柴胡 | | Stellaria root | 26 |
| Radix Salviae Miltiorrhizae | 丹参 | Dan Shen | Salvia miltiorrhiza root | 128 |
| Rhizoma Dioscoreae | 山药 | Shan Yao | Yam rhizome | 128 |
| Semen Euryales (stir-baked) | 芡实 (炒) | | Euryale pollen | 64 |
| Cornu Cervi Degelatinatum | 鹿角霜 | | | 48 |

== See also ==
- Chinese classic herbal formula
- Bu Zhong Yi Qi Wan
