= Liu Wei Di Huang Wan =

Traditional Chinese medicine

Liu Wei Di Huang Wan, also known as Liuwei Dihuang teapills (simplified Chinese: 六味地黄丸; traditional Chinese: 六味地黃丸; pinyin: liùwèi dìhuáng wán) or Six Flavor Rehmanni, is a prescription (方剂 fāng jì) in traditional Chinese medicine and pharmacy to treat yin deficiency. In Japanese kampo, it is known as "Rokumi-gan" (六味丸 ろくみがん, it is also known as Kampo #87). It is commonly made into Chinese patent medicine.

== History ==
The formula was created by Qian Yi as dihuang pill (地黄丸). It was published in "Xiao'er Yao Zheng Zhi Jue" (also known as "Key to Therapeutics of Children's Diseases" or "The Correct Execution of Pediatric Medicinals and Patterns" simplified Chinese: 小儿药证直诀; traditional Chinese: 小兒藥證直訣; pinyin: Xiǎo'ér Yào Zhèng Zhí Jué) in 1119 by Qian Yi's student.

The formula was altered slightly when it was borrowed as a Japanese kampo formula. Some Chinese species of herbs were replaced with herbs found in Japan. For example, Alisma plantago-aquatica was replaced with Alisma orientale for zé xiè.

== Derivatives ==
The Liuwei Dihuang Wan is one of the most important Chinese patent medicines, and is widely used in eastern Asia. In China, there are hundreds of medicinal manufacturers who produce Liuwei Dihuang Wan and its derivatives. These derivatives include Zhibai Dihuang Wan, Guifu Dihuang Wan, Mingmu Dihuang Wan, Qiju Dihuang Wan, Maiwei Dihuang Wan, and Guishao Dihuang Wan.

== Chinese classic herbal formula ==
| Name | Common Name | Pinyin | Chinese (T) | Chinese (S) | Katakana | Kanji | Genus species | Action in this formula |
|---|---|---|---|---|---|---|---|---|
| Rehmanniae Radix | Chinese foxglove root | shú dì huáng | 熟地黃 | 熟地黄 | ジオウ | 地黄 | Rehmannia glutinosa | Nourishes kidney yin & essence |
| Corni Fructus | Japanese cornel fruit | shān zhū yú | 山茱萸 | 山茱萸 | サンシュユ | 山茱萸 | Cornus officinalis | Nourishes the liver & kidney, restrains the leakage of the essence |
| Dioscoreae Rhizoma | Chinese yam rhizome | shān yào | 山藥 | 山药 | サンヤク | 山薬 | Dioscorea polystachya | Tonifies spleen yin & consolidate the essence |
| Alismatis Rhizoma | water plantain rhizome | zé xiè | 澤瀉 | 泽泻 | タクシャ | 沢瀉 | Alisma plantago-aquatica | Promotes urination to prevent buildup of significant fluids |
| Poria | tuckahoe mushroom | fú líng | 茯苓 | 茯苓 | ブクリョウ | 茯苓 | Poria cocos | Bland: drains dampness from the spleen |
| Cortex Moutan Radicis Cortex | tree peony bark | mǔ dān pí | 牡丹皮 | 牡丹皮 | ボタンピ | 牡丹皮 | Cortex Moutan Radicis | Clear liver fire |

== Japanese kampo formula ==
| Name | Common name | Pinyin | Chinese (T) | Chinese (S) | Katakana | Kanji | Genus species | Grams | % |
|---|---|---|---|---|---|---|---|---|---|
| Rehmanniae Radix | Chinese foxglove root | shú dì huáng | 熟地黃 | 熟地黄 | ジオウ | 地黄 | Rehmannia glutinosa | 5.0 | 25% |
| Corni Fructus | Japanese cornel fruit | shān zhū yú | 山茱萸 | 山茱萸 | サンシュユ | 山茱萸 | Cornus officinalis | 3.0 | 15% |
| Dioscoreae Rhizoma | Japanese yam rhizome | shān yào | 山藥 | 山药 | サンヤク | 山薬 | Dioscorea japonica | 3.0 | 15% |
| Alismatis Rhizoma | water plantain rhizome | zé xiè | 澤瀉 | 泽泻 | タクシャ | 沢瀉 | Alisma orientale | 3.0 | 15% |
| Poria | tuckahoe mushroom | fú líng | 茯苓 | 茯苓 | ブクリョウ | 茯苓 | Poria cocos | 3.0 | 15% |
| Paeoniae suffruticosa Cortex | tree peony bark | mǔ dān pí | 牡丹皮 | 牡丹皮 | ボタンピ | 牡丹皮 | Paeonia suffruticosa | 3.0 | 15% |

== See also ==
- Chinese herbology
- Chinese patent medicine
- Chinese classic herbal formula
- Kampo list
- Kampo herb list
- Zhibai Dihuang Wan
