= Wuzi Yanzong Wan =

Pill used in traditional Chinese medicine

Wuzi Yanzong Wan (Chinese: 五子衍宗丸) is a deep brown pill used in traditional Chinese medicine to "replenish the kidney with vital essence". It tastes sweet, sour and slightly bitter. It is used where there is "deficiency syndrome of the kidney marked by backache, dribbling of urine after micturition, seminal emission, premature ejaculation, impotence and sterility". The binding agent of the pill is honey.

== Chinese classic herbal formula ==
| Name | Chinese (S) | Grams |
|---|---|---|
| Fructus Lycii | 枸杞子 | 400 |
| Semen Cuscutae (stir-baked) | 大豆菟丝子 (炒) | 400 |
| Fructus Rubi | 覆盆子 | 200 |
| Fructus Schisandrae Chinensis seu Fructus Schisandrae Sphenantherae (steamed) | 五味子 (蒸) | 50 |
| Semen Plantaginis (stir-baked with salt) | 车前子 (盐炙) | 100 |

== See also ==
- Chinese classic herbal formula
- Bu Zhong Yi Qi Wan
