= Yinqiao Jiedu Wan =

Pill used in Traditional Chinese medicine

Yinqiao Jiedu Wan (simplified Chinese: 银翘解毒丸; traditional Chinese: 銀翹解毒丸, Pinyin: yín qiáo jiě dú wán) is a brown pill used in Traditional Chinese medicine to "induce diaphoresis, remove heat and counteract toxicity". It is aromatic, and it tastes bitter, pungent and slightly sweet. It is used where there is "upper respiratory infection with fever, headache, cough, dryness of the mouth and sore throat".

== Chinese classic herbal formula of Yinqiao Jiedu Wan ==
Name	Chinese (T)	Chinese (S)	Pinyin	Common name	Botanical Name	Grams
Flos Lonicerae	金銀花	金银花	jīn yín huā	Honeysuckle Flower	Lonicera japonica	200
Fructus Forsythiae	連翹	连翘	lián qiáo	Forsythia Fruit	Forsythia suspensa	200
Herba Menthae	薄荷	薄荷	bòhe	Field Mint Leaves	Mentha arvensis	120
Herba Schizonepetae	荊芥	荆芥	jīng jiè	Japanese Catnip Leaves	Schizonepeta tenuifolia	80
Semen Sojae Preparatum	淡豆豉	淡豆豉	dàn dòu chǐ	Prepared Soybean	Glycine max	100
Fructus Arctii (stir-baked)	牛蒡子(炒)	牛蒡子(炒)	niú bàng zǐ (chǎo)	Burdock Fruit (stir-baked)	Arctium lappa	120
Radix Platycodonis	桔梗	桔梗	jié gěng	Chinese Bellflower Root	Platycodon grandiflorum	120
Herba Lophatheri	淡竹葉	淡竹叶	dàn zhú yè	Lophatherum Leaves	Lophatherum gracile	80
Radix Glycyrrhizae	甘草	甘草	gān cǎo	Licorice Root	Glycyrrhiza uralensis	100

== See also ==
- Chinese classic herbal formula
- Bu Zhong Yi Qi Wan
