= Xiao Yao Wan =

Chinese herbal medicine

Xiao Yao Wan (simplified Chinese: 逍遥丸; traditional Chinese: 逍遙丸; pinyin: xiāo yáo wán), also known as Free and Easy Wanderer, is a Chinese classic herbal formula. It is commonly made into Chinese patent medicine.

== History ==
Xiao Yao Wan is an ancient Chinese patent medicine with a history of more than 1,000 years.

In the early days, the output of Chinese herbs was not high. In order to control the consumption of Chinese herbs, people ground Chinese herbs into powder.

== Formulation ==
While Xiao Yao Wan formulations vary, the herbs most often combined in Xiao Yao San are:

- Bupleurum (chai hu)
- Dong quai (dang gui)
- White peony root (bai shao)
- White atractylodes (bai zhu)
- Poria (fu ling)
- Peppermint (bo he)
- Quick fried ginger root (pao jian)
- Licorice root (zhi gan cao)

== Effects ==
Studies on Xiao Yao San are limited to animal studies. Nevertheless, XYS has been shown to improve stress and reduce depression.

== Traditional Medicine ==
Xiao Yao San (XYS) has been used for centuries by practitioners of Chinese Traditional Medicine. Practitioners of TCM believe XYS works by clearing liver stagnation to improve the flow of qi (energy). Stagnant liver qi is said to affect the blood and contribute to stress, mood swings, pain, irritability, constipation, abdominal pain, premenstrual syndrome (PMS), and irregular menstrual periods.

== Chinese classic herbal formula ==
Name	Common Name	Pinyin	Chinese (T)	Chinese (S)	Katakana	Kanji	Genus species
Bupleuri Radix	bupleurum root	chái hú	柴胡	柴胡	サイコ	柴胡	Bupleurum chinense
Paeoniae Radix	Chinese peony root	sháo yào	芍藥	芍药	シャクヤク	芍薬	Paeonia lactiflora
Angelicae Radix	Chinese angelica root	dāng guī	當歸	当归	トウキ	当帰	Angelica sinensis
Atractylodis Rhizoma	white atractylodes rhizome	bái zhú	白朮	白术	ビャクジュツ	白朮	Atractylodes macrocephala
Poria	tuckahoe mushroom	fú líng	茯苓	茯苓	ブクリョウ	茯苓	Poria cocos
Zingiberis Rhizoma	fresh ginger rhizome	shēng jiāng	生薑	生姜	ショウキョウ	生姜	Zingiber officinale
Glycyrrhizae Radix	Chinese liquorice root	gān cǎo	甘草	甘草	カンゾウ	甘草	Glycyrrhiza uralensis
Menthae Herba	wild mint herb	bò hé	薄荷	薄荷	ハッカ	薄荷	Mentha haplocalyx

== See also ==
- Chinese classic herbal formula
- Chinese patent medicine
