= Erchen Wan =

Pill used in Traditional Chinese medicine

Erchen Wan (simplified Chinese: 二陈丸; traditional Chinese: 二陳丸) is a greyish-brown to yellowish-brown pill used in Traditional Chinese medicine to "remove damp-phlegm and regulate the stomach function". It is used in cases where there is "cough with copious expectoration, sensation of stuffiness in the chest and epigastrium, nausea and vomiting due to the stagnation of damp-phlegm". It is slightly aromatic in odour and tastes slightly pungent and sweet.

== Chinese classic herbal formula ==
Name	Chinese (S)	Grams
Pericarpium Citri Reticulatae	陈皮	250
Rhizoma Pinelliae (processed)	半夏(制)	250
Poria	茯苓	150
Radix Glycyrrhizae	甘草	75

== See also ==
- Chinese classic herbal formula
- Bu Zhong Yi Qi Wan
