= Shihu Yeguang Wan =

Pill used in Traditional Chinese medicine

Shihu Yeguang Wan (Chinese: 石斛夜光丸) is a brownish-black pill used in traditional Chinese medicine to "replenish yin of the kidney, quench liver-fire and improve eyesight". It tastes sweet and slightly bitter. It is used where there is "deficiency of yin of the liver and the kidney with rousing of fire causing cataract with impaired vision".

== See also ==
- Chinese classic herbal formula
- Bu Zhong Yi Qi Wan
