= Gou pi gao =

Medicinal herbal plaster

Gou Pi Gao (Chinese: 狗皮膏), is a medicinal herbal plaster that is often used in traditional Chinese medicine. Gou Pi Gao, translated word for word, literally means dog skin plaster, which is indicative of its history.

== History ==
Gou Pi Gao was traditionally literally a dog skin plaster, with herbal medicines smeared onto a dog skin. It has been used for thousands of years, and used to treat various diseases. Various herbs are used in the plaster, and the plaster is adhesive.

In recent years, the plaster has changed quite drastically. Instead of herbs being smeared on patches of dog skin, patches of linen and fabric are used, due to the fact that dog skin is much more expensive and hard to obtain (animal rights). In addition, modern chemicals are often added to the adhesive "herbal" mixture on the plaster, including ingredients such as menthol and camphor.

== Treatment ==
Gou Pi Gao can be used to treat primarily muscle and tendon pains, caused by muscle sprains, tears, rheumatism, tendinitis and various other conditions. The adhesive plaster is applied to the area in pain, and left on for 3–5 hours (preferably with heat treatment in order to increase the medicine's effectiveness). Afterwards, it is removed, and the skin is left to rest for 2–3 hours, after which the Gou Pi Gao is reapplied.

However, Gou Pi Gao should only be used properly. It is an external plaster, and ingesting it may result in various complications (and one should contact a poison control center immediately upon ingestion). Certain medical conditions, such as pregnancy, may result in a higher risk factor in taking the medicine, and one should contact his/her doctor to prevent the risk of complications. Gou Pi Gao may also aggravate skin allergies caused by dermatitis. In addition, it may result in stains or smells.

In traditional Chinese medicine, the herbs used to make the paste of Gou Pi Gao include: Radix Aconiti (生川乌), Radix Aconiti Preparata (制川乌), Rhizoma et Radix Notopterygii (羌活), Radix Angelicae Pubescentis (独活), Caulis Sinomenii (青风藤), Cortex Periplocae (香加皮), Radix Saposhnikoviae (防风), Radix Smilacis (土茯苓), Rhizoma Atractylodis (苍术), Fructus Cnidii (蛇床子), Herba Ephedrae (麻黄), Rhizoma Alpiniae Officinarum (高良姜), Fructus Foeniculi (小茴香), Cortex Ramuli Cinnamomi (桂枝), Radix Angelicae Sinensis (当归), Radix Paeoniae Rubra (赤芍), Fructus Chaenomelis (木瓜), Lignum Sappan (苏木), Radix et Rhizoma Rhei (大黄), Radix Dipsaci (续断), Rhizoma Chuanxiong (川芎), Radix Angelicae Dahuricae (白芷), Olibanum (乳香), Myrrha (没药), Borneolum Syntheticum (冰片), Camphora (樟脑), Flos Caryophylli (丁香), and Cortex Cinnamomi (桂皮).
