= Sini San Wan =

Pill used in Traditional Chinese medicine

Si Ni Tang (Chinese: 四逆汤丸) is a brown pill used in Traditional Chinese medicine to "dispel cold and cause restoration upon collapse". It tastes sweet and pungent. It is used upon "collapse with cold sweat, cold limbs, diarrhea with fluid stool containing undigested food, and scarcely perceptible pulse". The formula (composed of processed Zingiber officinale, Glycyrrhiza uralensis, and Aconitum carmichaelii) has a potential benefit in treating septic shock.

== Chinese classic herbal formula ==
Name	Chinese (S)	Grams
Radix Aconiti Lateralis Preparata	附子	300
Rhizoma Zingiberis	干姜	200
Radix Glycyrrhizae Preparata	炙甘草	300

== See also ==
- Chinese classic herbal formula
- Bu Zhong Yi Qi Wan
