= Huaijiao Wan =

Pill used in Traditional Chinese medicine

Huaijiao Wan (Chinese: 槐角丸) is a blackish-brown pill used in Traditional Chinese medicine to "arrest bleeding by reducing heat from blood in treating hematochezia". It tastes bitter and astringent. It is used where there is "hematochezia, hemorrhoidal swelling and pain". The binding agent is a water-honey solution. Each pill weighs about 6 grams.

== Chinese classic herbal formula ==
Name	Chinese (S)	Grams
Fructus Sophorae (stir-baked)	槐角 (炒)	200
Radix Sanguisorbae (carbonized)	地榆 (炭)	100
Radix Scutellariae	黄芩	100
Fructus Aurantii (stir-baked)	枳壳 (炒)	100
Radix Angelicae Sinensis	当归	100
Radix Saposhnikoviae	防风	100

== See also ==
- Chinese classic herbal formula
- Bu Zhong Yi Qi Wan
