= Baizi Yangxin Wan =

Traditional Chinese medicine

Baizi Yangxin Wan (simplified Chinese: 柏子养心丸; traditional Chinese: 柏子養心丸) is a brown to dark brown pill used in Traditional Chinese medicine to "replenish qi and blood and induce sedation". It is used in cases where there is "deficiency of cold syndrome of the heart marked by cardiac palpitation, vulnerability to fright, insomnia, dream-disturbed sleep and forgetfulness". A honey solution is used as the binding agent.

== Chinese classic herbal formula ==
Name	Chinese (S)	Grams
Semen Platycladi	柏子仁	25
Radix Codonopsis	党参	25
Radix Astragali Preparata	炙黄芪	100
Rhizoma Chuanxiong	川芎	100
Radix Angelicae Sinensis	当归	100
Poria	茯苓	200
Radix Polygalae (processed)	远志(制)	25
Semen Ziziphi Spinosae	酸枣仁	25
Cortex Cinnamomi	桂皮	25
Fructus Schisandrae Chinensis seu Fructus Schisandrae Sphenantherae (steamed)	五味子(蒸)	25
Massa Pinelliae Fermentata	半夏曲	100
Radix Glycyrrhizae Preparata	炙甘草	10
Cinnabaris	硃砂	30

== See also ==
- Chinese classic herbal formula
- Bu Zhong Yi Qi Wan
