= Baohe Wan =

Pill used in Traditional Chinese medicine

Baohe Wan (Chinese: 保和丸) is a greyish-brown, slightly sour and astringent pill used in Traditional Chinese medicine to "stimulate digestion, remove retained food and regulate the stomach function". It is used in cases where there is "retention of undigested food with epigastric and abdominal distension, foul belching, acid regurgitation and loss of appetite".

== Chinese classic herbal formula ==
Name	Chinese (S)	Grams
Fructus Crataegi (charred)	山楂 (炭)	300
Massa Medicata Fermentata (stir-baked)	神曲 (炒)	100
Rhizoma Pinelliae (processed)	半夏 (制)	100
Poria	茯苓	100
Pericarpium Citri Reticulatae	陈皮	50
Fructus Forsythiae	连翘	50
Pollen Raphani (stir-baked)	莱菔子 (炒)	50
Fructus Hordei Germinatus (stir-baked)	麦芽 (炒)	50

== See also ==
- Chinese classic herbal formula
- Bu Zhong Yi Qi Wan
