= Gan mao ling =

Chinese herbal medication

Gan Mao Ling (simplified Chinese: 感冒灵; traditional Chinese: 感冒靈) is a Chinese herbal medication alleged to be effective in the early stages of cold or flu.

The ingredients of the remedy are:

- Ilex root, Gang Mei Gen
- Euodia leaf, San Cha Ku
- Chrysanthemum flower, Ju Hua
- Vitex herb, Huang Jing Cao
- Isatis root, Ban Lan Gen
- Lonicera flower, Jin Yin Hua
