= Chuang Song Zong Pharmaceutical Co., Ltd. =

Taiwanese pharmaceutical company

Chuang Song Zong Pharmaceutical Co., Ltd
- Type: Private
- Industry: Pharmaceutical
- Founded: 1873
- Headquarters: Kaohsiung, Taiwan
- Area served: Worldwide
- Key people: Chuang, Hsiao Chang; (Chairman & CEO); Zhuang Xiaozhang (General manager)
- Products: Chinese Patent Medicine
- Website: www.csz.com.tw

Chuang Song Zong Pharmaceutical Co., Ltd. (Chinese: 莊松榮製藥廠股份有限公司; pinyin: Zhuāngsōngróng Zhìyào Chǎng Yǒuxiàn Gōngsī) is a Taiwanese multinational pharmaceutical company headquartered in Kaohsiung City, Taiwan. with its research headquarters in Ligang, Pingtung County. The company was the first GMP certified Taiwanese firm manufacturing Chinese medicines.

Its products are regarded as prescription drugs in Taiwanese public health system.

== History ==
Chuang Song Zong Pharmaceutical Co., Ltd. was founded in 1873 by Chuang Wen-Tso who established a drug store in Cijin District, Kaohsiung.

In the early 20th Chuang Song Zong was a sole distributor of Tien-Jin Tong-Ren-Tang. Later, due to Second Sino-Japanese War caused a shortage of raw materials of Traditional Chinese Medicine, Chuang Song Zong started to be a manufacturer.

In the 1980s as a manufacturer of Chinese patent medicine, CSZ was the first Chinese Patent Medicine manufacturer obtained GMP certificate in Taiwan. Later, CSZ's products became prescription drugs in Taiwan.

Most of CSZ's products are in Taiwanese public health system since 1995.

From 2000 CSZ intended to export their products (Singapore, Europe, Australia, Hong Kong and America). By 2007, the company had penetrated European, North American, Australian, and Malaysian markets, among others; in Singapore, the company's medicines accounted for more than half of the country's scientific Chinese medicines.

In 2015, the company expanded into the field of Chinese herbal medicine biotechnology.

== See also ==
- Healthcare in Taiwan
