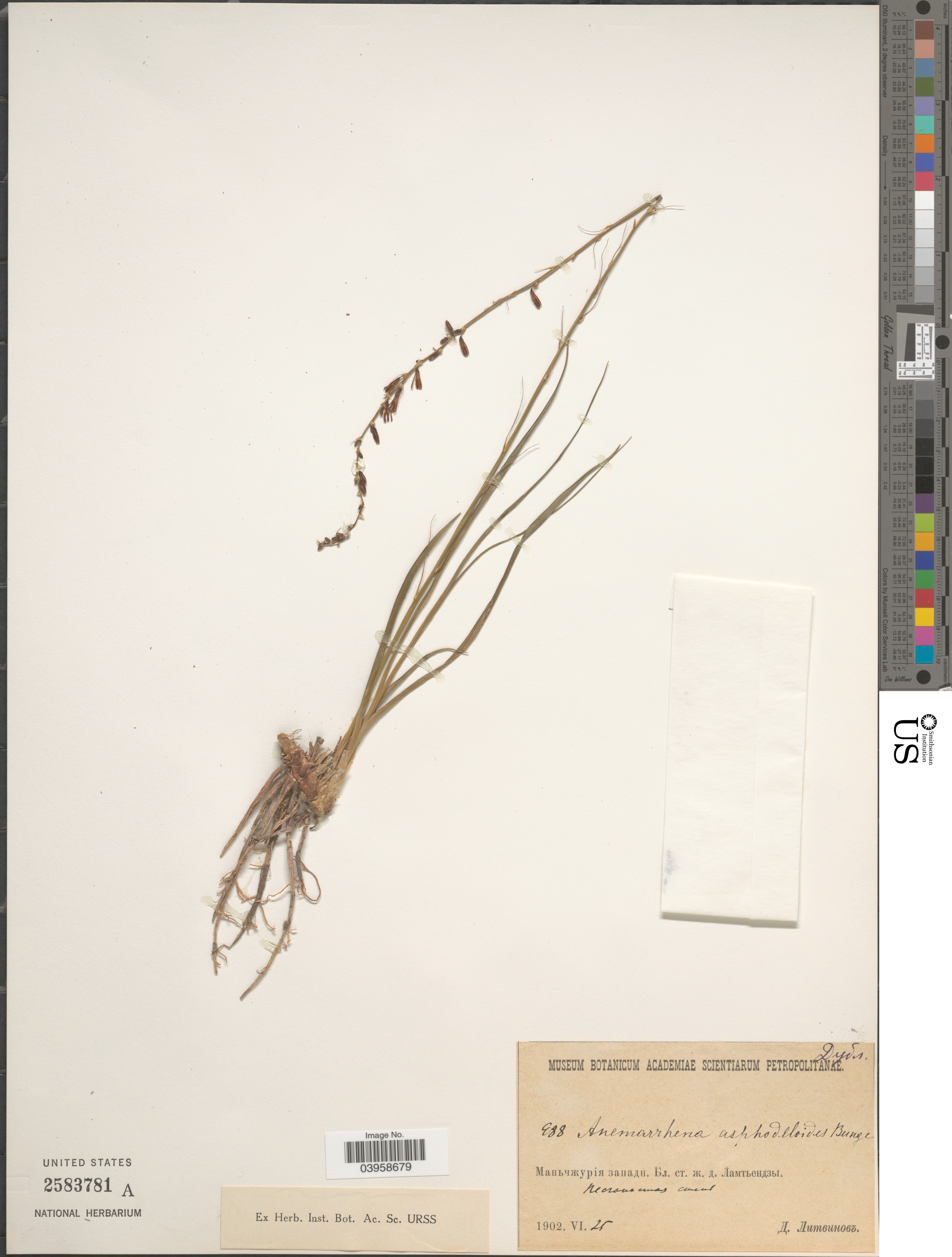

Scientific classification
- Kingdom: Plantae
- Clade: Embryophytes
- Clade: Tracheophytes
- Clade: Spermatophytes
- Clade: Angiosperms
- Clade: Monocots
- Order: Asparagales
- Family: Asparagaceae
- Subfamily: Agavoideae
- Genus: Anemarrhena; Bunge
- Species: A. asphodeloides

Binomial name
- Anemarrhena asphodeloides Bunge

Synonyms
- Terauchia Nakai; Terauchia anemarrhenifolia Nakai

= Anemarrhena =

Genus of flowering plants

Anemarrhena is a plant genus in family Asparagaceae, subfamily Agavoideae. It has only one species, Anemarrhena asphodeloides, native to China and Mongolia. Some authors have placed it in its own family, Anemarrhenaceae.

== Distribution ==
The plant is native to China and Mongolia, occurring in the western half of China, from Yunnan to Northeast China. It has been introduced into Taiwan and Korea.

== Traditional medicine ==
The plant name in China is zhīmǔ (知母) and its rhizome is used in traditional Chinese medicine.
