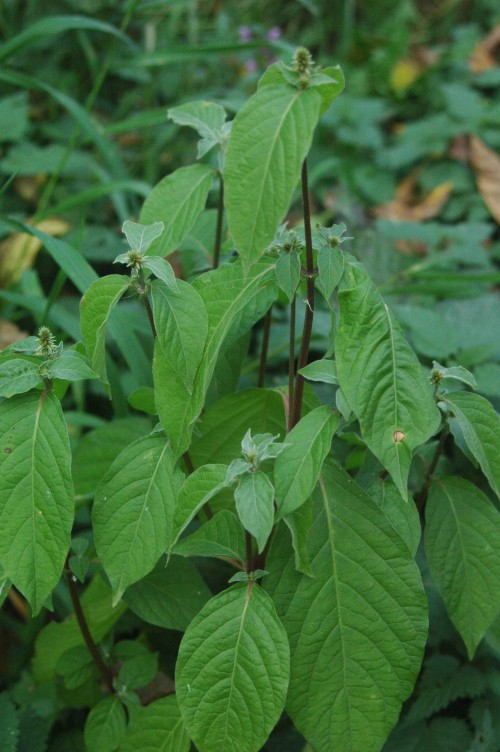

Scientific classification
- Kingdom: Plantae
- Clade: Embryophytes
- Clade: Tracheophytes
- Clade: Spermatophytes
- Clade: Angiosperms
- Clade: Eudicots
- Order: Caryophyllales
- Family: Amaranthaceae
- Genus: Achyranthes
- Species: A. bidentata

Binomial name
- Achyranthes bidentata Blume

= Achyranthes bidentata =

Species of flowering plant

Achyranthes bidentata Blume (English common name: ox knee, Chinese: 牛膝 niu xi) is a species of flowering plant in the amaranth family, Amaranthaceae. It occurs in India, Nepal, Korea, China, and Japan. It is the source of the Chinese herbal medicine Huai'niuxi (Chinese: 怀牛膝; pinyin: Huái'niúxī). In Nepal its root juice is used for toothache. Its seeds have been used as a substitute for cereal grains in famine years. The plant is used externally in the treatment of leech bites in Mizoram, India and a decoction as a diuretic.

During the Chinese Liang Dynasty, Achyranthes bidentata was used for its abortion effectiveness. Chinese folk doctors would take the juices of crushed up A. bidentata and insert them into the vagina to induce abortion. This abortive technique was common among folk medicine practitioners in southern China during the Republican period.

Achyranthes bidentata is now used for other things such as osteoperosis and arthritis, and known for its anti-inflammatory effects.

== Root ==
The root of this plant is known as Achyranthis Radix [or AR in short].
