= Coptis chinensis =

Chinese goldthread

Scientific classification
- Kingdom: Plantae
- Clade: Embryophytes
- Clade: Tracheophytes
- Clade: Angiosperms
- Clade: Eudicots
- Order: Ranunculales
- Family: Ranunculaceae
- Genus: Coptis
- Species: C. chinensis

Binomial name
- Coptis chinensis Franch.

Species of flowering plant

Coptis chinensis, the Chinese goldthread, is a species of goldthread flowering plant native to China.

== Etymology ==
- Coptis chinensis Franch. var. chinensis
  - (syn. Coptis teeta Wallich var. chinensis)

== Chemical constituents ==
The rhizomes of Coptis chinensis contain the isoquinoline alkaloids berberine, palmatine, and coptisine among others.

== Traditional uses ==
Coptis chinensis is one of the 50 fundamental herbs used in traditional Chinese medicine, where it is called duǎn è huánglián (Chinese: 短萼黄连). It has been proved to have anti‐cancer, anti‐inflammatory, and anti‐bacterial properties and to help to improve cardiovascular conditions.

== Other uses ==
Because of the strong coloring quality of berberine, it has been traditionally used as a dye, especially for wool and other fibers.
