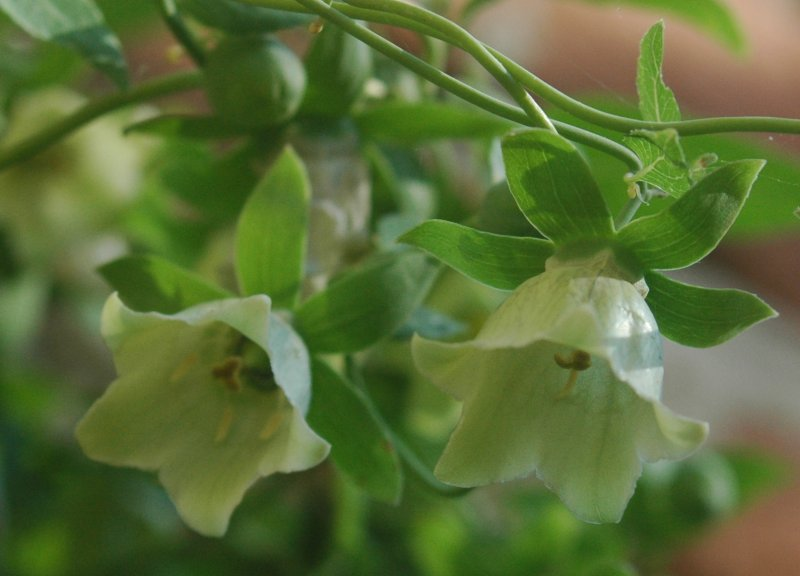

Scientific classification
- Kingdom: Plantae
- Clade: Tracheophytes
- Clade: Angiosperms
- Clade: Eudicots
- Clade: Asterids
- Order: Asterales
- Family: Campanulaceae
- Genus: Codonopsis
- Species: C. pilosula

Binomial name
- Codonopsis pilosula Franch.

= Codonopsis pilosula =

Species of flowering plant

Codonopsis pilosula, also known as Dangshen (Chinese: 党参; pinyin: Dǎngshēn), is a perennial species of flowering plant in the bellflower family. It is native to Asia, where it grows in forests, meadows, and scrub.

== Description ==
The plant produces twining stems up to 2 m (6.6 ft) long. It has lateral branches with alternately arranged leaves and small branchlets with oppositely arranged leaves. The ovate leaves are up to 7.3 cm (3 in) centimeters long and are usually coated with short hairs. Solitary flowers occur at the branch tips. The bell-shaped flower is about 2 cm (0.8 in) long and wide and is yellow-green with purple spots inside. The fruit capsule is up to 2.4 cm (0.9 in) long.

== Uses ==
=== Traditional ===
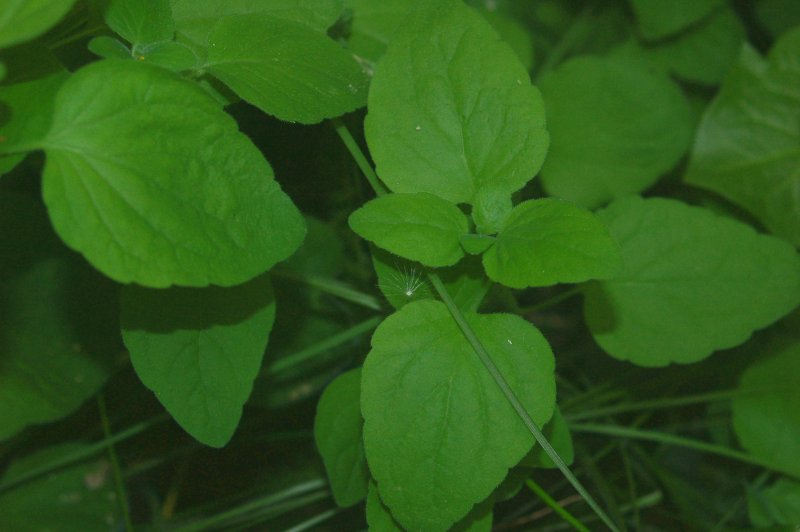
Leaves

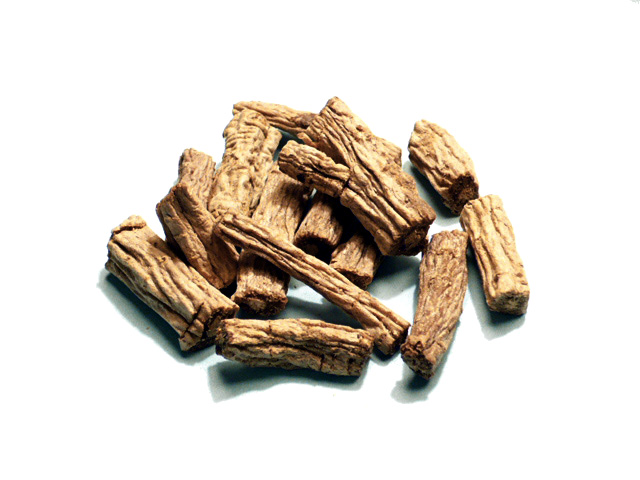
Dried Codonopsis pilosula root

The roots of C. pilosula are used in traditional Chinese medicine. They are carrot-shaped or cylindrical, sometimes branched, and up to 30 cm (12 in) long by 3 cm (1.2 in) wide. They are a constituent of Radix Codonopsis, a mixture used in herbal medicine.

=== Medicinal ===
The traditional medicinal use of Dangshen has inspired medical studies investigating the root's capabilities to treat cardiovascular, pulmonary and digestive conditions. Research into the effect of Condonopsis pilosula extract on gastric ulcers in rats showed a reduction in gastric acid production and severity of stress-induced ulcers.

== Phytochemicals ==
Codonopsis pilosula contains the beta-carboline based compound Perlolyrine.

== Subspecies ==
There are 3 subspecies:

- Codonopsis pilosula subsp. handeliana (Chinese: 闪毛党参; pinyin: shǎnmáo Dǎngshēn)
- Codonopsis pilosula subsp. pilosula (Chinese: 党参; pinyin: Dǎngshēn)
- Codonopsis pilosula subsp. tangshen (Chinese: 川党参; pinyin: Chuān Dǎngshēn) - widely cultivated
