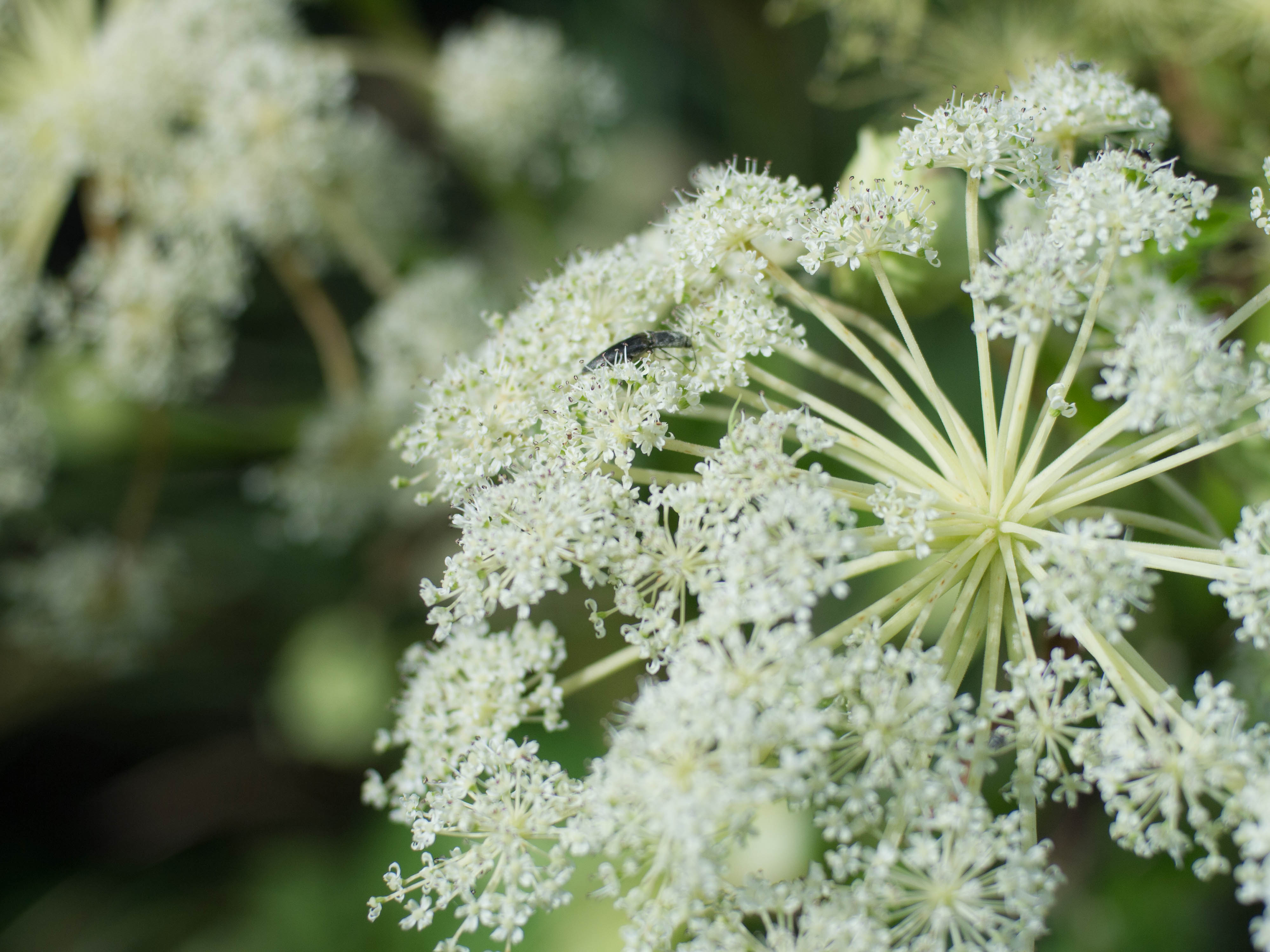
- Inflorescence of A. dahurica

Scientific classification
- Kingdom: Plantae
- Clade: Embryophytes
- Clade: Tracheophytes
- Clade: Spermatophytes
- Clade: Angiosperms
- Clade: Eudicots
- Clade: Asterids
- Order: Apiales
- Family: Apiaceae
- Genus: Angelica
- Species: A. dahurica

Binomial name
- Angelica dahurica (Hoffm.) Benth. & Hook.f. ex Franch. & Sav. (1873)

Varieties
- Angelica dahurica var. dahurica; Angelica dahurica var. formosana (H.Boissieu) Yen

Synonyms
- Callisace dahurica Hoffm. (1816); Thysselinum davuricum (Hoffm.) Spreng. (1824)

= Angelica dahurica =

Species of flowering plant

Angelica dahurica, commonly known as Dahurian angelica, is a widely grown species of angelica native to Siberia, Russia Far East, Mongolia, Northeastern China, Taiwan, the Korean Peninsula, and Japan. This species tend to grow near river banks, along streams and among rocky shrubs. The root of the plant is widely used for its medicinal properties and is known to contain furanocoumarins and angelicotoxin.

Angelica dahurica is also commonly known as Chinese angelica, the garden angelica, root of the Holy Ghost, and wild angelica, as well as by its Chinese name, bai zhi (白芷).

== Description ==
It is a perennial plant that grows to about 1–2 m (3 ft 3 in – 6 ft 7 in) tall. The plant usually has a brown cylindrical root that grows approximately 2–5 cm (0.8–2 in) thick. The stem is purplish-green in color, ribbed, and it usually ranges from 2–8 cm (0.8–3 in) thick in diameter. First year plants remain in a basal clump about 30–50 cm (10–20 in) high, fuller in rich soil, with complex divided leaves 30–50 cm (10–20 in) long, and reddish-purple coloring at the base. In the second or third year plant, the plant sends up a sturdy, hollow 3 cm (1 in) diameter stalk to 2 m (8 ft). The plant produces greenish-white flowers on umbels up to 30 cm (12 in) in diameter that bloom in the summer, usually from July to September. The seeds of the plant follow, turning from greenish-white to medium brown and papery as they ripen from August to October.

The flowers of the plant are hermaphroditic (containing both male and female reproductive organs) and are pollinated via insects. The plant also undergoes self pollination. The roots and leaves of the plant are strongly aromatic. The roots have a scent resembling that of wild carrots (Daucus carota), and a pungent, bitter taste.

== Varieties ==
Two varieties are accepted.

- Angelica dahurica var. dahurica – northern China, Korea, and Japan to southern Siberia and Russian Far East
- Angelica dahurica var. formosana (H.Boissieu) Yen – Taiwan

== Propagation ==
In an ideal climate, most species of Angelica, including the dahurican root, can thrive in moist and shady environments, at the same time where sun is accessible when necessary. It is best to plant fresh seeds of this plant once available. Once the seeds have ripened, its color brown and texture papery, they are immediately sown in a cold frame in deep, moist, fertile soil. Though the plants can grow under semi-shade or full-shaded conditions, the seeds require light for it to germinate. In addition, since this is a perennial plant, seeds are not required for its growth. A. dahurica can grow back naturally on its own, year after year. The Dahurican roots are primarily produced in China's Sichuan province, in the Suining district.

=== Cultivation ===
The Dahurican roots are harvested twice a year during the summer and autumn seasons. Its cylindrical roots must be harvested before the plant's stalk emerges. The leaves are removed, the side roots are trimmed, and the roots are thinly sliced, longitudinally. Afterwards, the sliced roots are dried under the sun. In Suining, 70% of its usage are for general purposes whereas 100% of its usage are for medicinal purposes. The roots are also harvested and cultivated in Taiwan, Japan, and Korea.

== Medicinal uses ==
The medicinal properties of the Dahurican root has been dated back to Ancient China as early as 400 BC. Zhang Cong Zhen (1156–1228), a famous physician in the military, believed that diseases were caused by external evil factors, or pathogens, that entered the human body. He listed Bai Zhi as an herb that purge the body of any negative influences such as heat, clamminess, dryness, and cold on the skin. Today, the roots are used for other numerous treatments of illnesses such as headaches, relieving nasal obstruction, detoxification of the blood, as a pain reliever, an anti-inflammatory, a laxative, sedative, anti-fungal cream for skin, as well as treating swollen gums and toothaches.

=== Other uses ===
The stalks of this plant have also been commonly used as a food ingredient, such as seasoning pig trotters in Chinese cuisine. The stems have been made into decorative items. The seeds are often used as a seasoning condiment in food as well as a source of flavoring in liqueur. Another popular usage for this herb is its ingredient in cosmetic products.

== Toxicity ==
Aside from the medicinal properties that this plant offers, this species also contain furocoumarins which increases skin sensitivity to sunlight and may cause dermatitis. Another compound, called the angelicotoxin, is an active ingredient within the root. This has an excitatory effect on the respiratory system, central nervous system, and the vasculomotor system of the body. It is known to increase the rate of respiration, blood pressure, decrease pulse rate, increases saliva production and induces vomiting. In large doses, the toxin can induce convulsions and paralysis.
