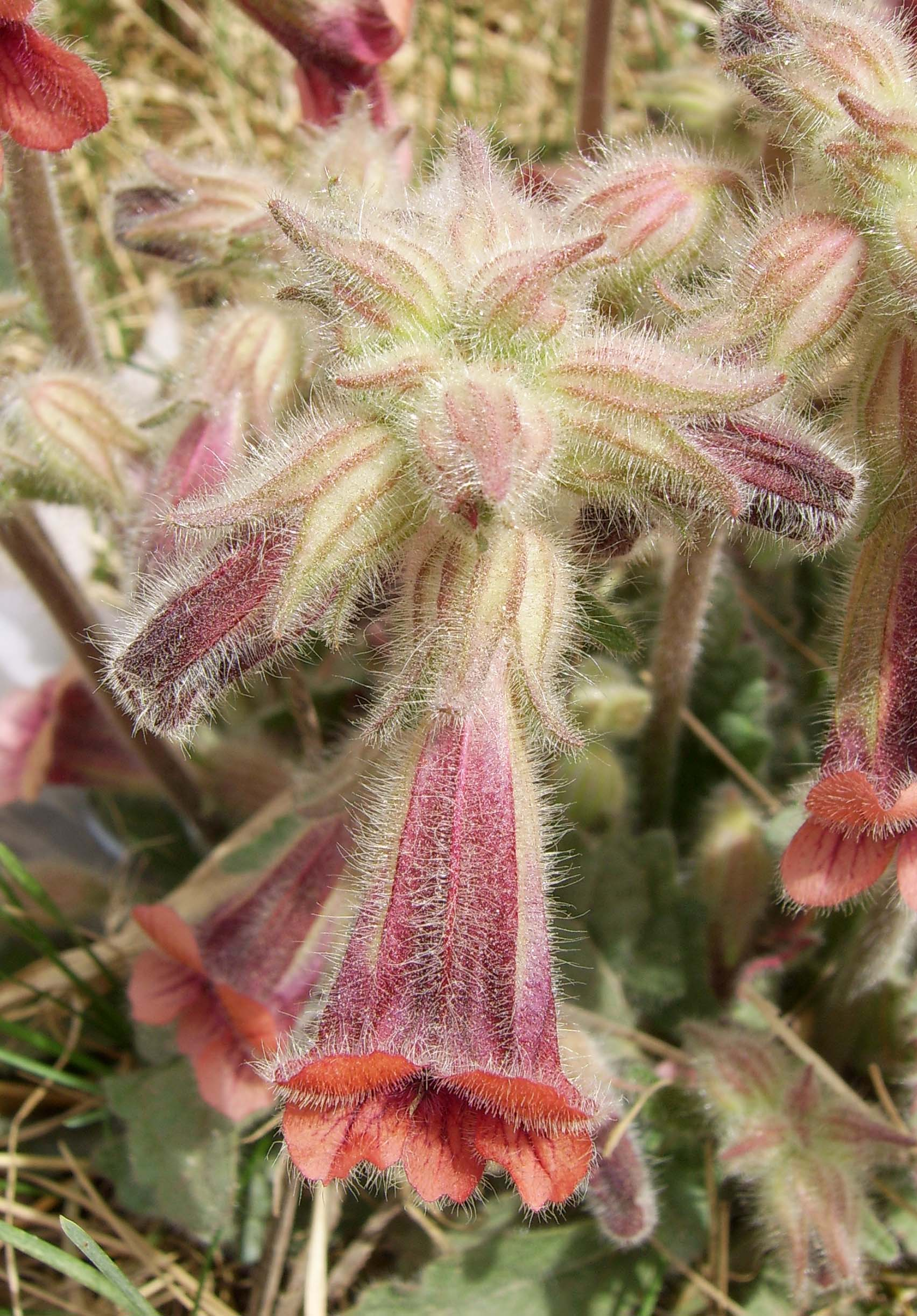

Scientific classification
- Kingdom: Plantae
- Clade: Tracheophytes
- Clade: Angiosperms
- Clade: Eudicots
- Clade: Asterids
- Order: Lamiales
- Family: Orobanchaceae
- Genus: Rehmannia
- Species: R. glutinosa

Binomial name
- Rehmannia glutinosa (Gaertn.) Steud.

= Rehmannia glutinosa =

Species of plant

Rehmannia glutinosa is a flowering broomrape, and one of the 50 fundamental herbs used in traditional Chinese medicine, where it has the name shēng dì huáng (Chinese: 生地黄). It is often sold as gān dì huáng (Chinese: 干地黄), gān meaning "dried". Unlike the majority of broomrapes, R. glutinosa is not parasitic, and is capable of independent photosynthesis.

== Chemical constituents ==
A number of chemical constituents including iridoids, phenethyl alcohol, glycosides, cyclopentanoid monoterpenes, and norcarotenoids, have been reported from the fresh or processed roots of R. glutinosa.

== Etymology ==
- Rehmannia is named for Joseph Rehmann (1788–1831), a physician in St. Petersburg.
- Glutinosa means 'glutinous', 'sticky', or 'viscous'.

== See also ==
- Chinese herbology – 50 fundamental herbs
