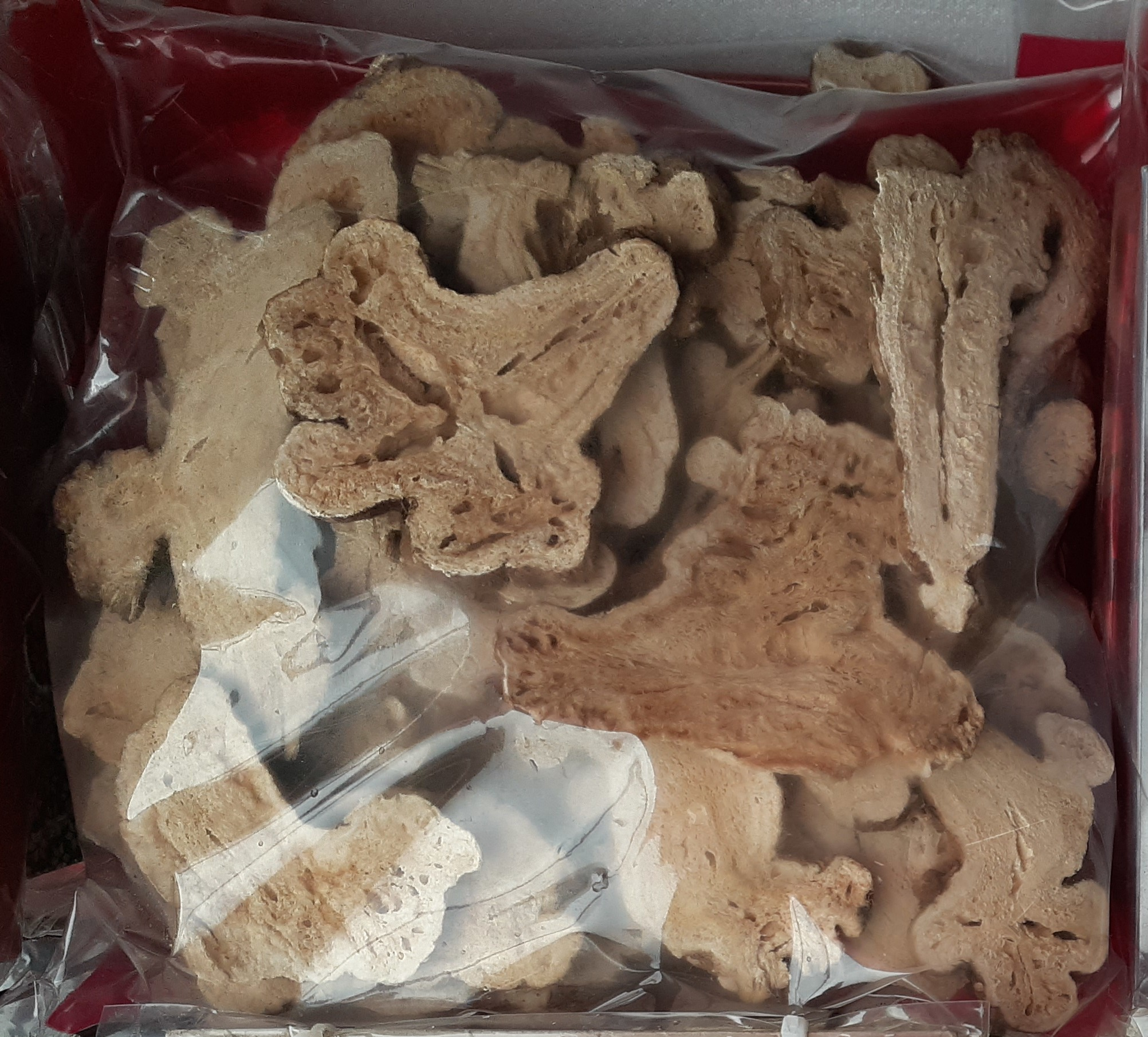
- Dried roots of A. macrocephala

Scientific classification
- Kingdom: Plantae
- Clade: Tracheophytes
- Clade: Angiosperms
- Clade: Eudicots
- Clade: Asterids
- Order: Asterales
- Family: Asteraceae
- Genus: Atractylodes
- Species: A. macrocephala

Binomial name
- Atractylodes macrocephala Koidz.

= Atractylodes macrocephala =

Species of plant

Atractylodes macrocephala
- Traditional Chinese: 白朮
- Simplified Chinese: 白术
Transcriptions
Standard Mandarin
- Hanyu Pinyin: báizhú
- IPA: [pǎɪʈʂǔ]
Yue: Cantonese
- Jyutping: baak^{6}seot^{6}
- IPA: [pak̚˨sɵt̚˨]

Atractylodes macrocephala (simplified Chinese: 白术; traditional Chinese: 白朮; pinyin: báizhú) is a species of Atractylodes that grows in central China. The roots are consumed as a Chinese herbal medicine.

== Description ==
Atractylodes macrocephala are herbs that reach a size of 20-60 cm in height. Thick rhizome. Stem branched from the base, glabrous. Leaves similar to paper, glabrous. The middle cauline leaves petiolate, petiole 3-6 cm; leaf blade divided almost at the base into 3-5 segments, lateral segments entire or bipartite, oblanceolate to narrowly elliptical, 4.5-7 x 1.5-2 cm, with the terminal segment being the largest. The tall cauline leaves are similar but smaller. Outer bracts sessile, elliptical/narrowly elliptical, entire margin; the inner bracts pinnatisects. Involucre broadly campanulate, 3-4 cm in diameter. Phyllaries are numerous, imbricated, with white cobwebby margin and apex obtuse; outer phyllaries ovate to triangular, 6-8 × 3-4 mm, bracts lanceolate. Corolla red-purple, 1.7 cm. Achene obconic, 7.5 mm, hairs white. Dirty white papus, 1.7 cm. Flowers and fruits from August to October. It has a chromosome number of 2n = 24 *.

== Distribution ==
It is found in the grasslands, forests, at an altitude of 600-2800 meters, in Anhui, Chongqing, Fujian, Guizhou, Hubei, Hunan, Jiangxi and Zhejiang in China.

== Uses ==
Atractylodes macrocephala is cultivated throughout China. The rhizomes, called Bái zhú (白术) are used in traditional Chinese medicine for multiple medicinal purposes, especially those concerning spleen issues and other gastrointestinal issues. Modern research shows A. macrocephala contains many pharmacologically active chemical compounds.
