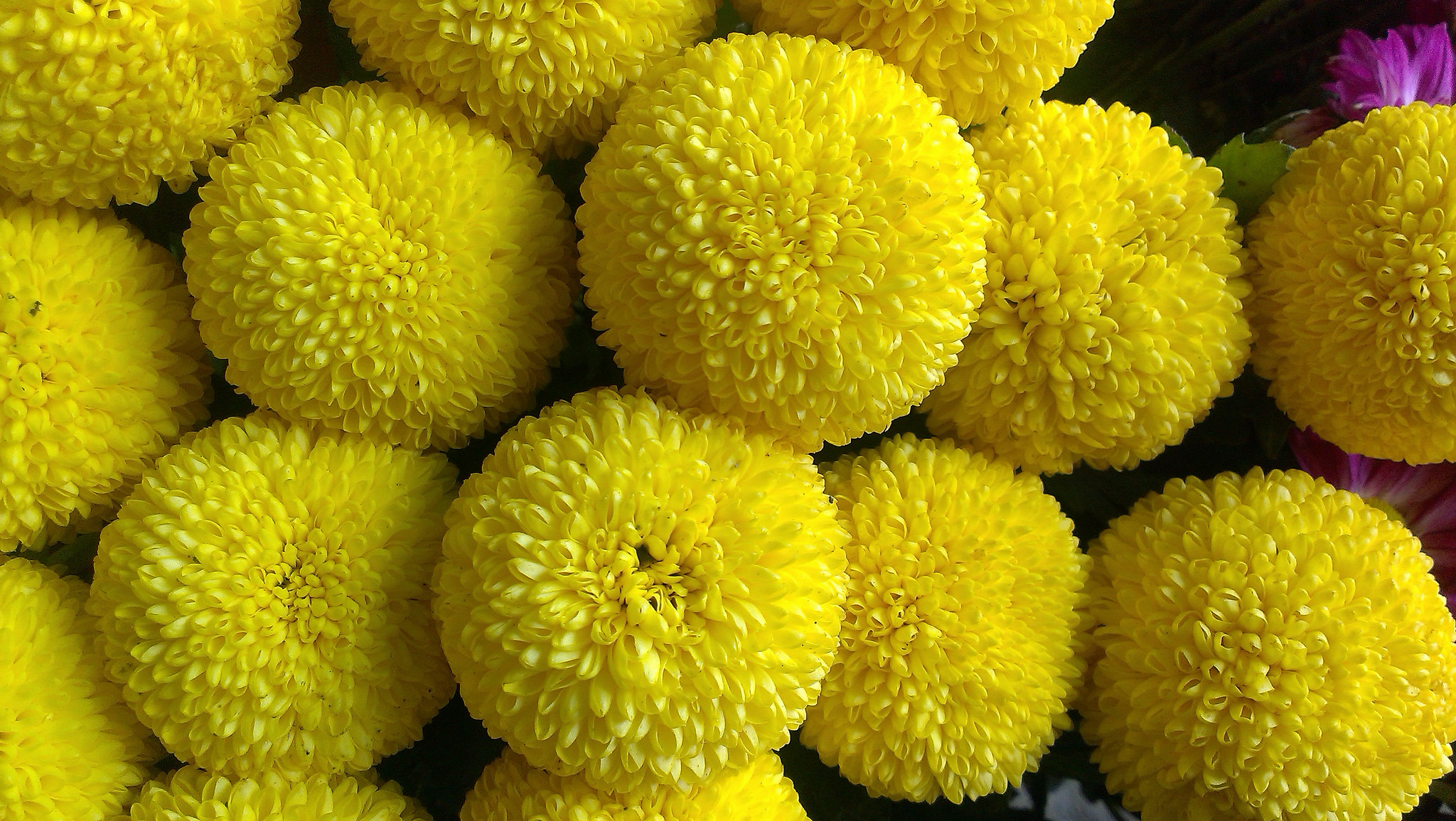
- Dolomiaea saussureoides

Scientific classification
- Kingdom: Plantae
- Clade: Tracheophytes
- Clade: Angiosperms
- Clade: Eudicots
- Clade: Asterids
- Order: Asterales
- Family: Asteraceae
- Subfamily: Carduoideae
- Tribe: Cardueae
- Subtribe: Saussureinae
- Genus: Dolomiaea; DC.

Type species
- Dolomiaea macrocephala Royle

Synonyms
- Aucklandia Falc.; Mazzettia Iljin; Bolocephalus Hand.-Mazz.; Vladimiria Iljin; Frolovia (DC.) Lipsch.

= Dolomiaea =

Genus of flowering plants

Dolomiaea is a genus of Asian flowering plants in the family Asteraceae.

The genus name of Dolomiaea is in honour of Déodat Gratet de Dolomieu (1750–1801), a French geologist.

As of December 2023, Plants of the World Online accepts the following species:

- Dolomiaea asbukinii (Iljin) N.Garcia, Herrando & Susanna – Kazakhstan, Kyrgyzstan, Tajikistan, Uzbekistan
- Dolomiaea baltalensis Dar & Naqshi – India, Kashmir
- Dolomiaea berardioidea (Franch.) C.Shih – Yunnan
- Dolomiaea calophylla Y.Ling – Tibet
- Dolomiaea costus (Falc.) Kasana & A.K.Pandey – South Asia, China
- Dolomiaea crispoundulata (C.C.Chang) Y.Ling – Tibet
- Dolomiaea edulis (Franch.) C.Shih – Yunnan, Tibet
- Dolomiaea forrestii (Diels) C.Shih – Yunnan, Tibet, Sichuan
- Dolomiaea georgii (J.Anthony) C.Shih – Yunnan
- Dolomiaea gorbunovae (Kamelin) N.Garcia, Herrando & Susanna – Kyrgyzstan
- Dolomiaea lateritia C.Shih – Tibet
- Dolomiaea macrocephala DC. ex Royle – Nepal, Uttarakhand, Himachal Pradesh, Kashmir
- Dolomiaea platylepis (Hand.-Mazz.) C.Shih – Sichuan
- Dolomiaea salwinensis (Hand.-Mazz.) C.Shih – Yunnan
- Dolomiaea saussureoides (Hand.-Mazz.) Y.L.Chen & C.Shih – Tibet
- Dolomiaea scabrida (C.Shih & S.Y.Jin) C.Shih – Tibet
- Dolomiaea souliei (Franch.) C.Shih – Yunnan, Tibet, Sichuan
- Dolomiaea wardii (Hand.-Mazz.) Ling – Tibet
