= Guangdong Experimental High School =

Coordinates: 23.12603°N 113.27741°E

Guangdong Experimental High School 广东实验中学

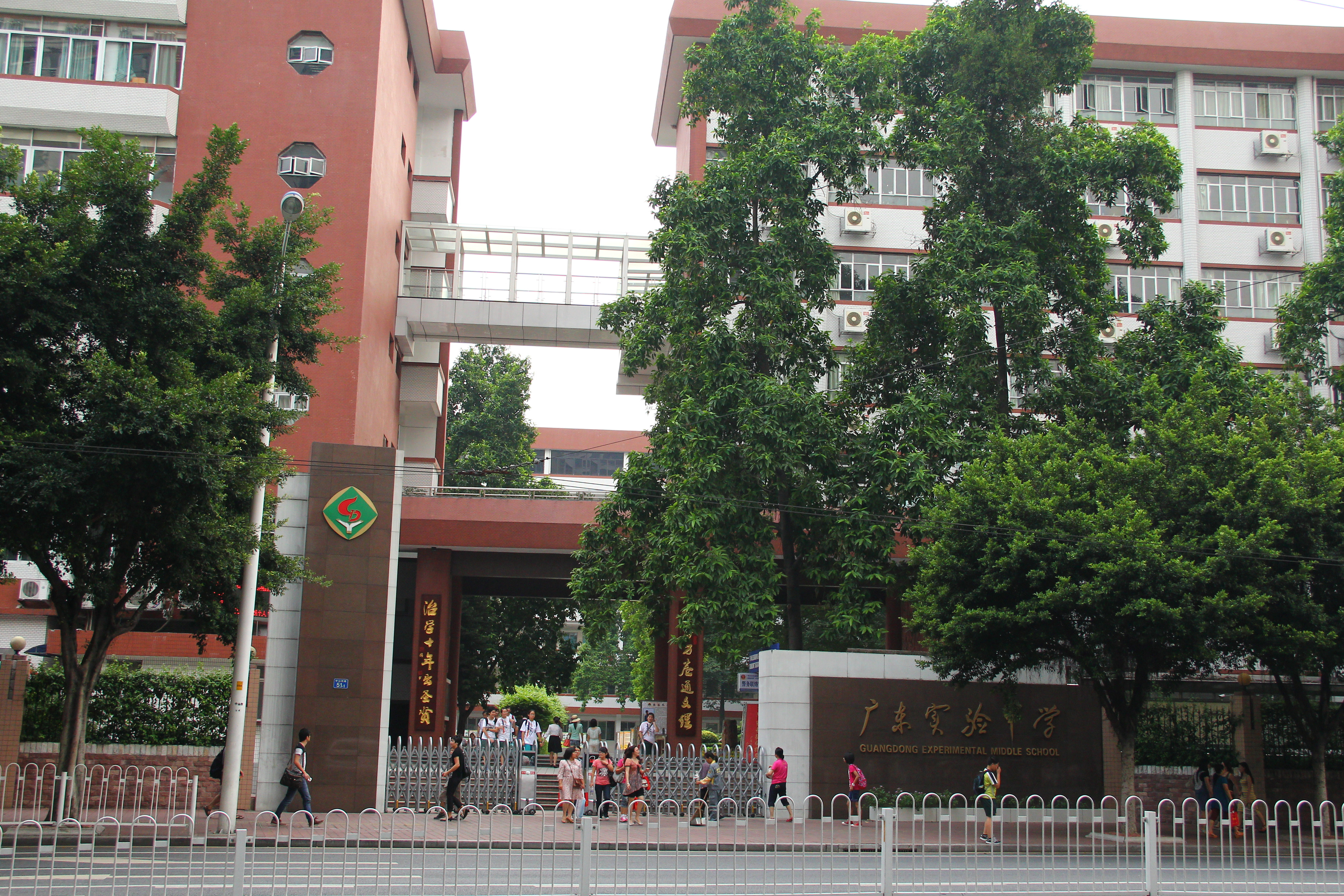
- The front gate of SS

Location
- Junior Campus; 51 No.4 Zhongshan Rd, Yuexiu District, Guangzhou, 510055; Senior Campus; 1 Shengshi Lu, Longxi Dadao, Liwan District, Guangzhou, 510375; Yuncheng Campus; Yun'an Lu, Baiyun New Town, Baiyun District, Guangzhou, 510410; Yongping Campus; Dongkeng Jie, Baiyun District, Guangzhou, Guangdong, China, 510442

Information
- Type: Public
- Motto: "Patriotic, United, Honest, Innovative"
- Established: 1960; Trace back to 1888
- Headmaster: Cai Zhi(蔡骘）
- Staff: Approx 330
- Grades: Senior 1 - 3 Junior 1 - 3
- Gender: Mixed
- Enrollment: Senior: Approx 3200; Junior: Approx 1800
- Average class size: 50 - 55
- Colors: Green & White
- Athletics: Badminton; Athletics
- Deputy Heads: Li Xiapin; Li Ziliang; Huang Jianwei
- Boarding students: 95% of student body
- Day students: 5% of student body
- Magazines: SS VOG, qingtong, shiyu, zuishengshi
- Curriculum: Secondary
- Website: www.gdsyzx.edu.cn

Guangdong Experimental High School (simplified Chinese: 广东实验中学; traditional Chinese: 廣東實驗中學; pinyin: Guǎngdōng shíyàn Zhōngxué; Jyutping: Gwong^{2}dung^{1} Sat^{9}jim^{6} Zung^{1}hok^{9}) is a Public High School in Guangzhou, Guangdong Province, People's Republic of China. It is regarded as one of the six best high schools in the city, and it is one of the two high schools directly administered by the Department of Education of Guangdong Province (along with the Affiliated High School of South China Normal University).

The school is commonly known as SS, an abbreviation of Sheng Shi or Sang Sat,(simplified Chinese: 省实; traditional Chinese: 省實; pinyin: shěngshí; Jyutping: saang^{2}sat^{9}) by parents and students in Guangzhou. It means 'Provincial Experimental (school)', which abbreviates Guangdong Experimental High School.

If unspecified, Guangdong Experimental High School refers to the senior high campus in Fangcun.

== History ==
The history of the school has always been a controversial topic as it involves many schools in the city after a series of mergers and splits. Strictly speaking, the current school established in 1960, however, the origin of the school can be traced back to 'Guǎngdōng Gézhì Xuétáng'(Chinese: 广东格致学堂) in 1888. Because many reforms were made as the school developed, there are different stories regarding this topic. Some argue that the establishing date of the school should be in 1924. It is backed up by the story that the school selected the year to commemorate Sun Yat-sen.

In 1888, Dr. Andrew Patton Happer established the Christian College in Shaji, Guangzhou, known as '广东格致学堂' in Chinese. It was then reformed into National Higher Normal College, known as '两广优级师范学堂' in Chinese, in 1910 to train teachers within Guangdong and Guangxi Provinces.

In 1924, the college merged into National Kwangtung University, which later became the Sun Yat-sen University in 1926, as its affiliated high school and primary school.

Due to the disciplinary adjustment to Chinese Higher Education, four high schools merged into the Affiliated School of South China Normal University in 1952:

- the Affiliated School of Sun Yat-Sen University
- the Affiliated High School of Lingnan University
- the Affiliated High School of South China Associated University
- the Affiliated High School of Guangdong College of Arts & Science.

In 1960, the school was split into a high school and a primary school. The high school later became the current Affiliated High School of South China Normal University, whereas the primary school had then reformed into the current school.

Guangdong Experimental High School was renamed to the No.60 Middle School of Guangzhou for a decade during the Cultural Revolution. After that, it formalised its name as Guangdong Experimental High School in 1987.

== Present day ==
The school now has four campuses. The main campus, senior high campus, locates at Kengkou, Liwan District, Guangzhou. It is also known as the 'New Campus' or 'Fangcun Campus' to students as it was constructed in 2004 and the location was in the previous Fangcun District, which was withdrawn and merged to Liwan District in 2005.

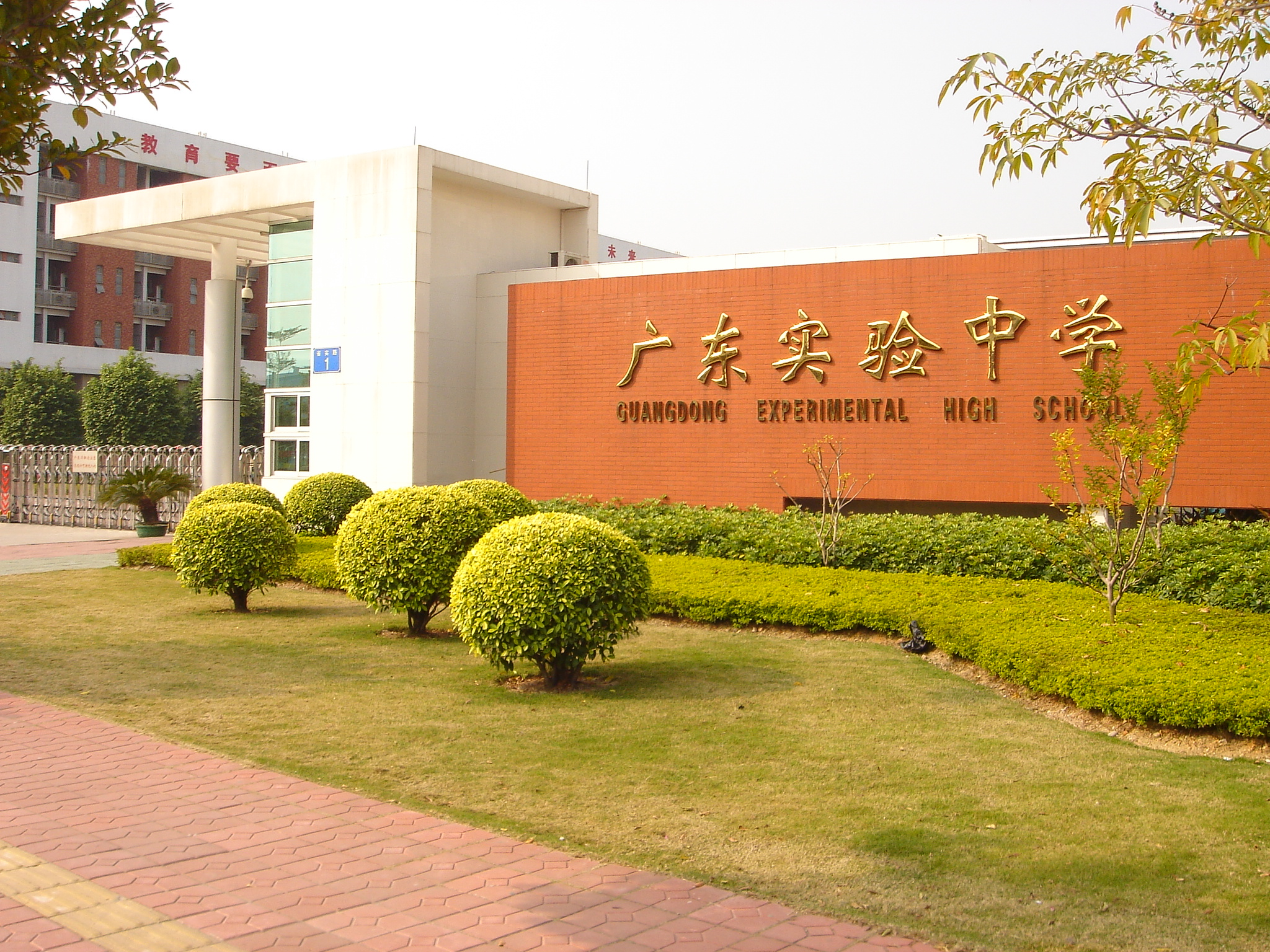
the Senior High campus

The old campus, also known as 'Zhongsi Campus', then became the junior high campus, since three upper grades moved to the new campus. It is located at No.4 Zhongshan Rd in Yuexiu District, Guangzhou. 'Zhongsi Campus' was the only campus before the school expanded at the beginning of the 21st century. It represents the history and development of the school since 1960.

Other campuses are as follows;

- Tianhe Campus, locates at Yuangang, Tianhe District, Guangzhou.
- Shunde Campus was established in 2008 in Shunde, Foshan.
- Nanhai Campus was established on 19 April 2009 in Nanhai, Foshan.
- Baiyun Campus was established in 2023 in Baiyun District, Guangzhou.

Generally, these three campuses are not accepted as part of the school. Although they are administered by the same senior management team and have links with SS's main campus, they are highly independent and completely privately funded. They are more commonly known as the affiliated Schools of SS, and are generally excluded by students and parents when regarding to school. Notice that in 2022, the Tianhe Campus changed its name to Guangzhou Tianxing Experimental School and was since considered an independent school.

== Notable alumni ==
SS has thousands of notable alumni all over the world, including four fellows of the Chinese Academy of Sciences and three fellows of the Chinese Academy of Engineering.

- Deng Ximing – (CAS)
- Huang Yaoxiang – (CAE)
- Fan Haifu – (CAS)
- Cai Ruixian – (CAS)
- Jiang Boju – (CAS)
- Cen Kefa – (CAE)
- Zhong Nanshan – (CAE)

== American Campus Fraud ==
In September 2011, several major medias reported that a new campus of SS in Los Angeles, CA, United States was established, which made SS the first Chinese high school to have a campus in the United States of America. However, this was soon discovered to be a fraud, and the said collaboration between SS and the US Academy was never formed in any ways. A few weeks later, the school made a formal apology to the public, the alumni in America in particular.
