= Guangzhou Women and Children's Medical Center =

Guangzhou Women and Children's Medical Center (Chinese: 广州妇女儿童医疗中心)

Geography
- Location: Guangzhou, China

Organisation
- Type: public, 3A, specialist
- Affiliated university: Guangzhou Medical University

History
- Founded: 2006

Links
- Website: https://www.gzfezx.com/

The Guangzhou Women and Children's Medical Center, full name "Affiliated Women and Children's Medical Center of Guangzhou Medical University", also known as the "National Children's Medical Center", is a Grade A tertiary hospital in Guangzhou, capital of Guangdong Province. It is the largest public women and children's specialist hospital in South China, integrating disease prevention, medical treatment, health care, scientific research and medical education.

== Historical Development ==
In 1968 during the Cultural Revolution, Guangzhou Children's Hospital and Guangzhou Maternal and Child Health Hospital were merged to form the Seventh People's Hospital of Guangzhou.

In March 1973, the authorities abolished the Seventh People's Hospital and restored the Children's Hospital and Maternal and Child Health Hospital.

In September 2006, Guangzhou Children's Hospital, Guangzhou Maternal and Child Health Hospital (Guangzhou Municipal Hospital for Women and Infants), and Guangzhou Population and Family Planning Technical Service Guidance Institute were integrated into the Guangzhou Women and Children's Medical Center, while the original names of the constituent institutions were retained.

In 2012, the hospital passed the review of the Joint Commission International (JCI), and became the first hospital in South China to win the JCI certification.

In November 2014, the hospital became a non-directly affiliated hospital of Sun Yat-sen University.

In 2020, the National Health Commission decided to establish a National Regional Children's Medical Center in the Central and Southern Region, with the Guangzhou Women and Children's Medical Center as its main body.

In 2023, the hospital's primary name was changed to the "Affiliated Women and Children's Medical Center of Guangzhou Medical University", while retaining the names of the "Municipal Women and Children's Medical Center", the "Municipal Maternal and Child Health and Family Planning Service Center", the "Municipal Maternal and Child Health Hospital", the "Municipal Children's Hospital", and the "Municipal Maternal and Infant Hospital".

In April 2026, the National Health Commission upgraded the Women and Children's Medical Center from a National Regional Children's Medical Center to a National Children's Medical Center.

== Hospital Campuses ==
=== Children's Campus ===
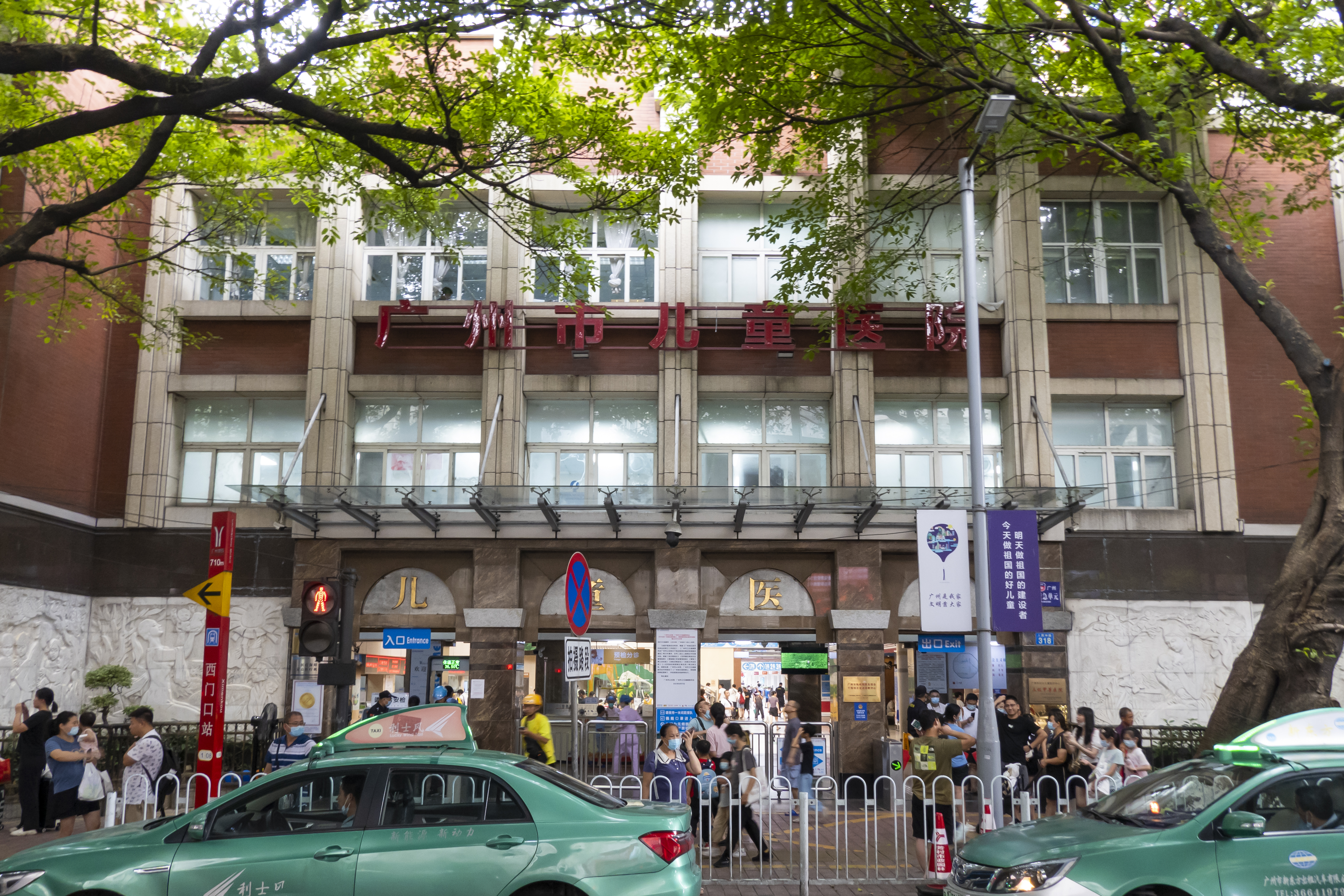
Children's Campus Main Entrance

Former Site of Da Paul Hospital
- Location: Inside Guangzhou Children's Hospital

The children's hospital is located at No. 318, Renmin Middle Road, Guangta Street, Yuexiu District, Guangzhou, and retains the original name of "Guangzhou Children's Hospital".

The Children's Hospital was originally the Da Paul Medical Clinic founded in 1928 by the American Da Paul. During his time in Guangzhou. Da Paul frequently sponsored young doctors to study abroad. In 1909, he participated in the establishment of the Guangdong Public Medical School, one of the predecessors of Sun Yat-sen Medical University. The school's affiliated public hospital had Da Paul as its director. In 1928, Da Paul resigned and, together with his family, opened the Da Paul Medical Clinic. In 1933, the clinic moved to No. 30, Guanlu Road and was renamed "Da Paul Hospital". After the fall of Guangzhou due to Japanese invasion of China, Da Paul and his wife remained in the city. In 1940, Paul died, and the Pacific War broke out. The hospital was listed as enemy property by the Wang Jingwei government, and Mrs. Da Paul was imprisoned. The hospital was forced to close and was converted into the Health Department of the Guangdong Provincial Government. After World War II, the hospital was first taken over by the Health Department of the Guangdong Provincial Government, and then handed over to Da Paul's adopted daughter, Yao Hui Da Paul, to resume operations. However, due to poor management, the hospital could not recover its former glory.

After the founding of the People's Republic of China, Da Paul's daughter donated the hospital property to the Chinese government. The Guangzhou Municipal People's Government took over the hospital in July 1951 and converted it into the Second Department (Pediatrics Department) of Guangzhou Municipal Hospital the following month. In January 1953, it was merged into Guangzhou People's Hospital. In August of the same year, it was renamed "Guangzhou Children's Hospital". In 1956, a new outpatient building was built at the current site.

In 1994, the Children's Hospital established the Guangzhou Pediatric Research Institute, in 1997 it became a non-directly affiliated hospital of Guangzhou Medical College, and in 1998 it established the Guangzhou Critical Care Center for Children.

In January 2014, the former site of Da Paul Hospital was selected as one of the first batch of historical buildings in Guangzhou.

=== Maternal and Child Health Campus ===
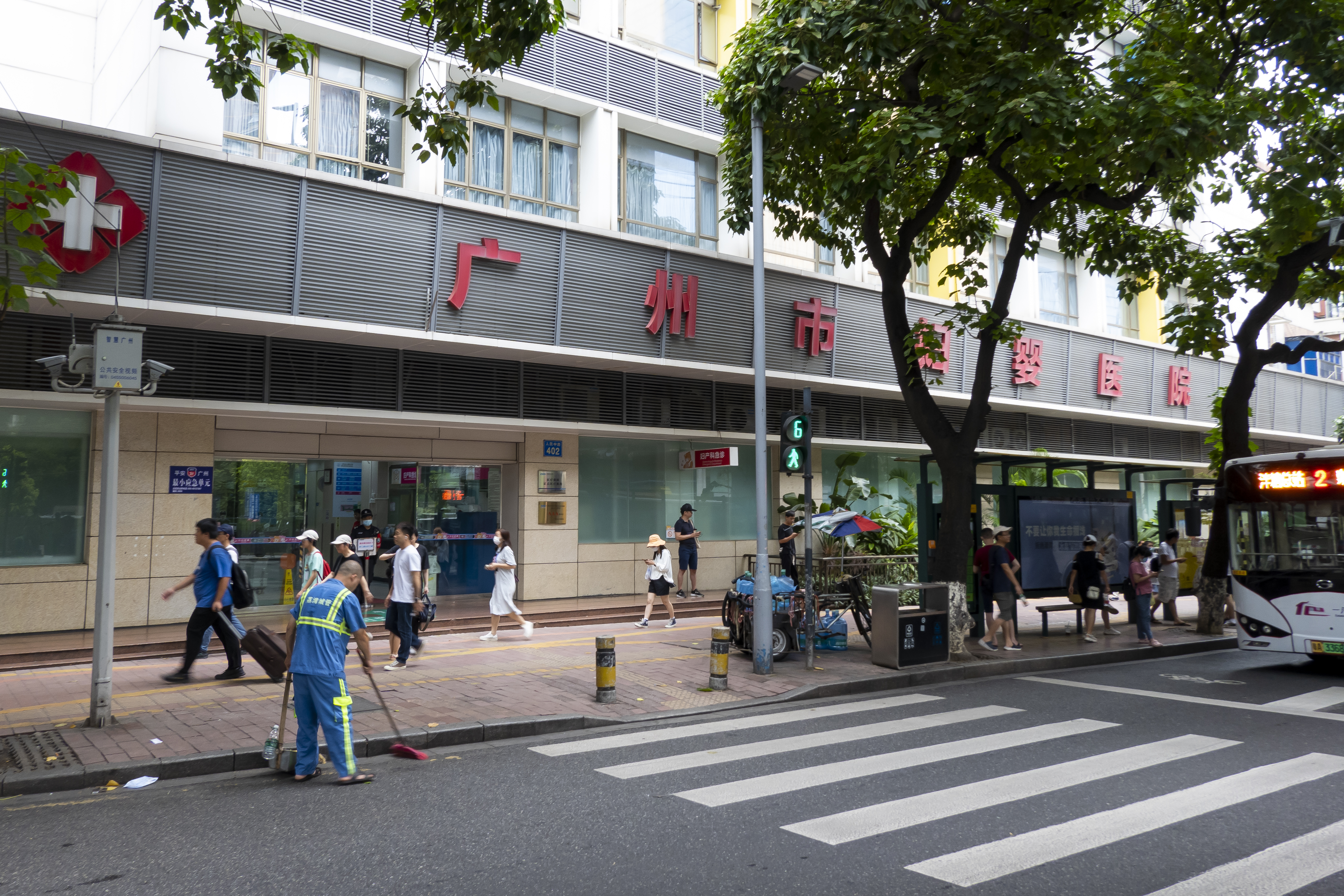
Maternal and Child Health Campus

The Maternal and Child Health Hospital is located at No. 402, Renmin Middle Road, Guangta Street, Yuexiu District, Guangzhou, and retains the original names of "Guangzhou Maternal and Child Hospital" and "Guangzhou Maternal and Child Health Hospital".

The hospital was originally the Maternal and Child Health Hospital founded in 1908 in Shiliupu by obstetrician Xie Aiqiong and the Beiduolu Hospital founded in 1946 in Baogang, Henan by Sister Ge Shiling of the Canadian Catholic Church. The Maternal and Child Health Hospital was taken over by the Guangzhou Municipal People's Government in August 1956; the Beiduolu Hospital was taken over by the Guangzhou Municipal Health Bureau in 1953, renamed Guangzhou Henan District Maternity Hospital in March 1954, and merged into the Maternal and Child Health Hospital in October 1956.

In May 1963, the Maternal and Child Health Hospital was renamed "Guangzhou Maternal and Child Health Hospital". The inpatient department and offices were moved to the current location (formerly Zhou Huomin Hospital), while the outpatient department remained at the original location on Huifu West Road. In December 1968, it merged with the Children's Hospital to become the Seventh Municipal Hospital, and the obstetrics and gynecology inpatient and outpatient departments were moved to the Children's Hospital. In March 1973, the Maternal and Child Health Hospital was reinstated, and the inpatient and outpatient departments were moved back to the original location on Renmin Middle Road. In December 1986, the Maternal and Child Health Hospital was also designated as Guangzhou Maternal and Child Hospital. In September 1997, it became a non-directly affiliated hospital of Guangzhou Medical College.

=== Zhujiang New Town Campus ===
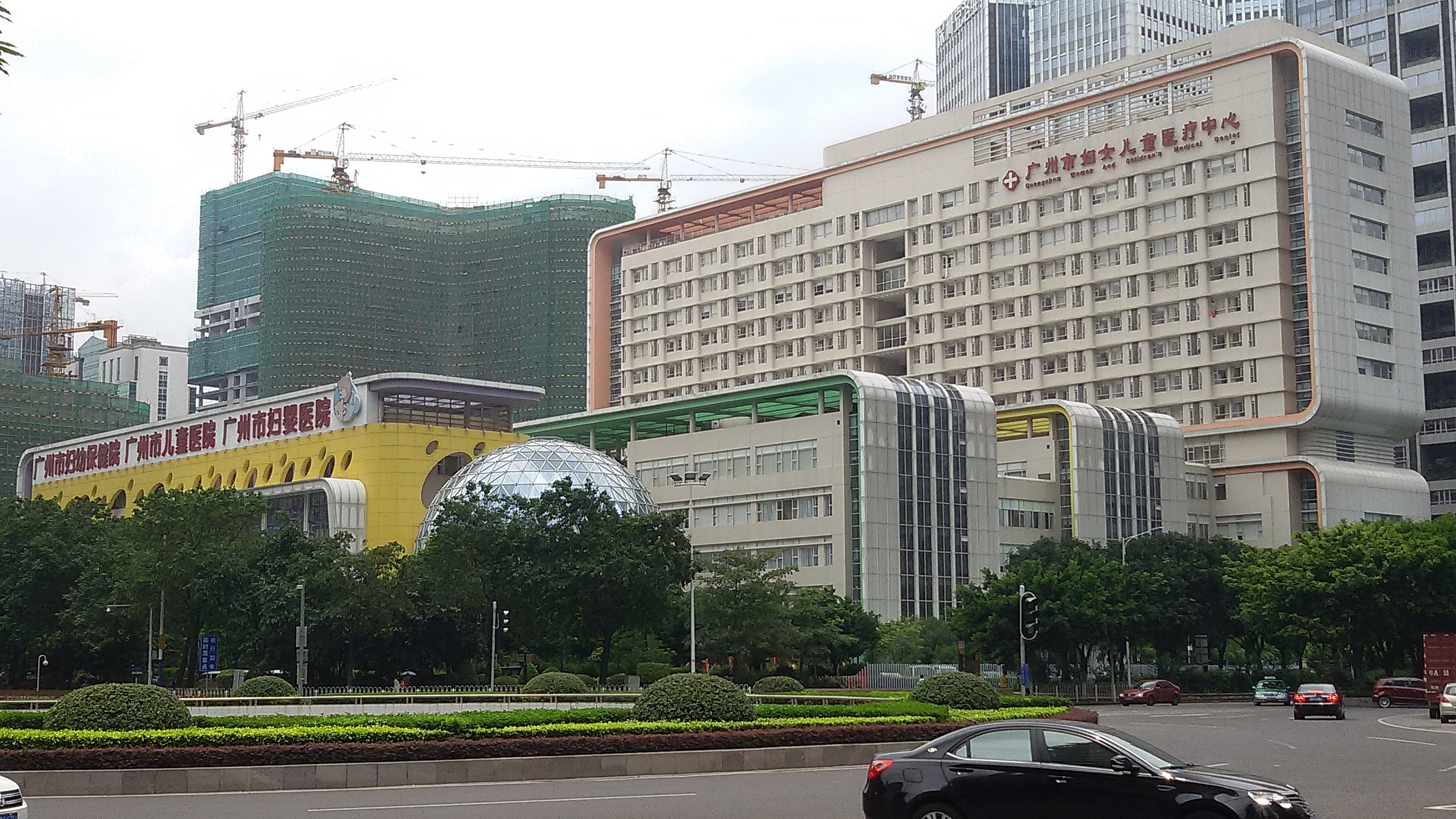
Zhujiang New Town Campus

The Zhujiang New Town Campus is located at No. 9 Jinsui Road, Xiancun Street, Tianhe District, Guangzhou.

In 2004, due to the long-term overload operation of Guangzhou Children's Hospital and Maternal and Child Health Hospital, the Guangzhou authorities decided to build a brand-new maternal and child medical center in Zhujiang New Town. Construction of the hospital began in May 2005 and was completed in September 2009. At the time of its completion, it was touted as the largest and best-equipped women and children's hospital in South China. The hospital officially opened on October 9 of the same year.

=== Zengcheng Campus ===
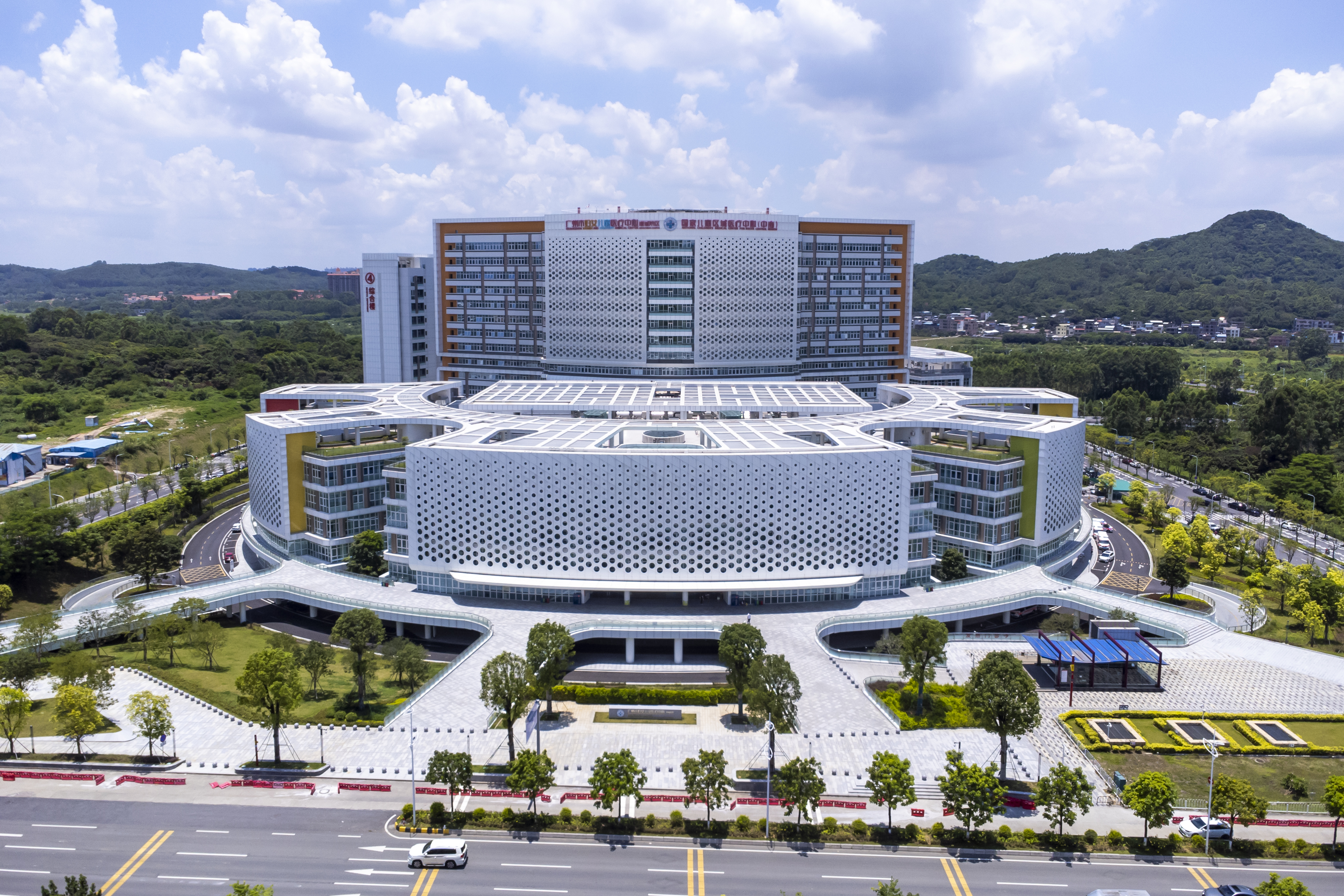
Zengcheng Campus

The Zengcheng Campus is located at No. 293 Zengcheng Avenue, Qingyan Community, Zengcheng District, Guangzhou, and is also known as "Guangzhou Zengcheng District Maternal and Child Health Hospital".

In September 2017, the Zengcheng District Maternal and Child Health Hospital was transferred to the management of Guangzhou Women and Children's Medical Center, and the construction of the new campus was launched. After the outbreak of COVID-19, the hospital adjusted the design of the infection building and increased its building area to meet the needs of epidemic prevention and control. In September, 2022, the Zengcheng Campus officially began operation. It was touted as the largest women and children's hospital in Asia.

=== Baiyun Campus ===
The Baiyun Campus is located at No. 91-93 Xinda Road, Xinshi Street, Baiyun District, Guangzhou.

In September 2020, the Baiyun Campus Children's Autism Assessment and Intervention Center opened. As of now, the Baiyun Campus only provides outpatient services for children's health management, developmental promotion, psychological and behavioral therapy, and health education. It does not provide services for fever, cough, diarrhea, emergency care, or obstetrics and gynecology, nor does it offer public medical insurance coverage.

=== Liuzhou Hospital ===
Liuzhou Hospital is located at No. 50 Boyuan Avenue, Luorong Town, Yufeng District, Liuzhou City, Guangxi Zhuang Autonomous Region. It is the Medical Center's first branch outside the city of Guangzhou. It also carries the names of "Liuzhou Children's Hospital" and "Liuzhou Maternity and Child Health Hospital".

The hospital was formerly the Liudong Branch of Liuzhou Maternal and Child Health Hospital, which was put into use in 2017. It was the first children's hospital in Guangxi. In November 2021, the People's Government of Guangxi Zhuang Autonomous Region, the People's Government of Liuzhou City, and Guangzhou Women and Children's Medical Center signed a cooperation agreement to jointly build a regional children's medical center. On December 27 of the following year, Guangzhou Women and Children's Medical Center Liuzhou Hospital was officially established. In October 2022, Liuzhou Hospital was selected into the fourth batch of national regional medical center projects.

=== Other branches under construction ===
Nansha Branch: Located on Jiaomen South Road, Huangge Town, Nansha District, construction started in March 2020.

Huadu Campus: Located in Shigang Village, Huacheng Street, Huadu District, it was jointly constructed by the Huadu District People's Government, the Guangzhou Municipal Health Commission, and the Guangzhou Women and Children's Hospital. Construction began in January 2022.

== Other information ==
Guangzhou Women and Children's Medical Center has more than 1,800 beds, with an annual record of 4.5 millions outpatient visits and 130,000 inpatient admissions.

As of July 2023, the Guangzhou Women and Children's Hospital had three national key clinical specialties: Pediatric Gastroenterology, Pediatric Respiratory Medicine, and Pediatric Surgery; and eight Guangdong provincial key clinical specialties: Obstetrics, Gynecology, Neonatal Medicine Center, Stomatology Center, Fetal Medicine Center, Maternal and Child Health Specialty, Clinical Nutrition Department, and Pediatric Critical Care Department.

In academic research, the hospital published 38 papers listed in Nature Index for the Time frame of 1 June 2025 - 30 May 2026, ranking 443rd globally and 174th in China in healthcare.

In the 2024 China Hospital and Specialty Reputation Ranking, the Guangzhou Women and Children's Medical Center ranked A+ (top-80) in the comprehensive hospital ranking, and its Pediatric Surgery ranked 5th nationally.

== See also ==
- Guangzhou Medical University
- List of hospitals in China
- Guangzhou Women and Children's Medical Center station
