= Swithun Lowe =

Singaporean educator (died 2007)

Lowe in 2007.

Swithun Lowe (1945 or 1946 – 22 October 2007) was a Singaporean educator and union leader who served on the Central Committee of the National Trades Union Congress and as the secretary-general of the Singapore Teachers' Union.

== Early life and education ==
Lowe was born in the mid-1940s. He received his secondary education at the St. Gabriel's Secondary School in the 1960s. He then studied at the Teachers' Training College. He also studied law. He took the Cambridge Higher School Certificate examinations as a private candidate in 1972.

== Career ==
Lowe began his career as a primary school teacher after graduating from the Teachers' Training College in the mid-1960s. He taught English. He began volunteering part-time for the Singapore Teachers' Union (STU). He was elected to the committee of the Catholic Teachers' Movement in 1972. After nine years as a teacher, he resigned in 1973 to work for the STU full-time, being elected the assistant treasurer in June 1973. The year after, he was elected the union's deputy general-secretary and was acting as the general-secretary in November. In April 1975, Lowe was elected to the committee of the National Book Development Council of Singapore. From 1982 to 1984, he served on the National Trades Union Congress (NTUC) Youth Committee. By November 1988, he was the STU's assistant secretary. He was again the deputy general-secretary by June 1992.

In April 2000, Lowe was elected to the Central Committee of NTUC. The STU was then one of the larger labour unions in the country, with over 13,000 members. In that same year, he became a member of the NTUC Membership Council, the NTUC Industrial Relations Committee (Public Sector) and the PSC Workers' Advocate Panel for Disciplinary Inquiries. He was additionally appointed the chair of the NTUC Membership Committee (Public Sector). Lowe was elected the STU's general-secretary in 2001. In 2002, he was appointed the chair of the NTUC Club Paradigm Advisory Committee. In 2003, while catching up with an old friend of his, educational media publisher and former Member of Parliament R Sinnakaruppan, the latter agreed to partner with the STU to publish the monthly Quest magazine, which was aimed at children and young teenagers. The idea to publish such a magazine had first been proposed three decades ago, but, until Sinnakaruppan had agreed to the proposition, STU "didn't have the means or network to do it."

Lowe became an Alternate Member of the NTUC Industrial Relations Committee (Public Sector) instead of a regular member in 2003. In 2004, he was appointed the head of the NTUC Education Cluster. He was conferred the Public Service Medal at the 2006 National Day Awards. Lowe resigned as STU general-secretary and from several of his posts in the NTUC in July 2007. He was succeeded as secretary-general by Edwin Lye. He was one of four prominent unionists with the NTUC who stepped down in that period to "make way for new and young blood." He continued with the STU as a senior consultant. He spent 34 years with the union in total.

Zul Othman of today reported in Lowe's obituary that the unionist had served as the "voice of the teachers" for Singapore and the surrounding region. According to the NTUC, he was a "firm believer in leadership renewal and the need for STU to rejuvenate itself with new and younger leaders, in order to grow." As the STU general-secretary, Lowe expressed his fears at the 1992 National Education Association meeting in the United States that teachers would be "left behind in the new global economy." He noted that there was a concern that a potential recession in the US or Europe could "[put] the squeeze" on Singapore's education budget. He pushed for the formation of the STU's Educare Co-operative, launched in 2004 as its first business wing, which was to expand on the support the STU offered its members. It was proposed that the scheme could offer childcare services, training, certification and potentially scholarship opportunities and study grants to the union's members. Leaders of the ASEAN Council of Teachers often sought his advice.

== Personal life and death ==
Lowe was married with three children. Singing was a hobby of his, and close friends considered him a "musical encyclopaedia". He left for Guangzhou on 8 September to attend a three-day seminar organised by NTUC. However, he was hospitalised at the First Affiliated Hospital of Guangzhou Medical University due to heart complications and underwent surgery soon after. Though his condition initially appeared stable and arrangements had been made for him to return to Singapore, his health suddenly deteriorated once more and he died on 22 October.

He was posthumously conferred the Comrade of Labour (Star) award at the 2008 May Day Awards.
