= First Affiliated Hospital of Guangzhou Medical University =

Hospital in Guangzhou, China

The First Affiliated Hospital of Guangzhou Medical University (广州医科大学附属第一医院)
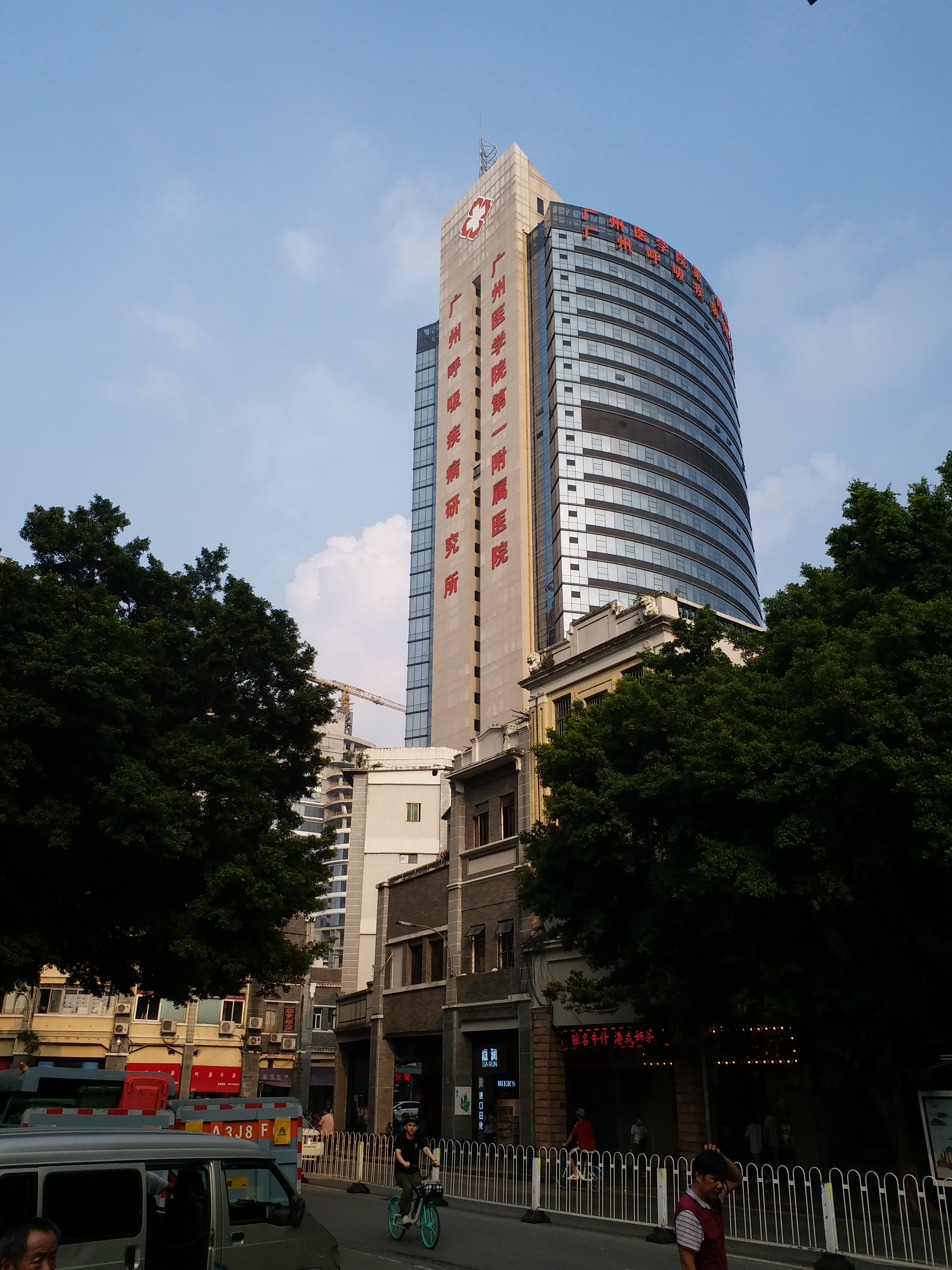
- The inpatient building of the Riverside Campus (photographed in August 2019)

Geography
- Location: No. 151, Yanjiang West Road, Yuexiu District, Guangzhou City, Guangdong Province, China

Organisation
- Type: public, general, 3A
- Affiliated university: Guangzhou Medical University

Services
- Emergency department: Yes

History
- Founded: 1903

Links
- Website: https://www.gyfyyy.cn/cn/index.html
- Lists: Hospitals in China

The First Affiliated Hospital of Guangzhou Medical University is the oldest hospital of the Guangzhou Medical University in Guangzhou, China. Founded in 1903, the hospital has developed into a large comprehensive Grade A tertiary hospital integrating medical treatment, teaching and scientific research. It is also the hosting institution of the National Center for Respiratory Medicine in south China.

In 2020, Professor Zhong Nanshan of the First Affiliated Hospital of Guangzhou Medical University was listed on the Time (magazine)'s 100 Most Influential People in the World and was bestowed by Chairman Xi Jinping the Medal of the Republic.

== History ==
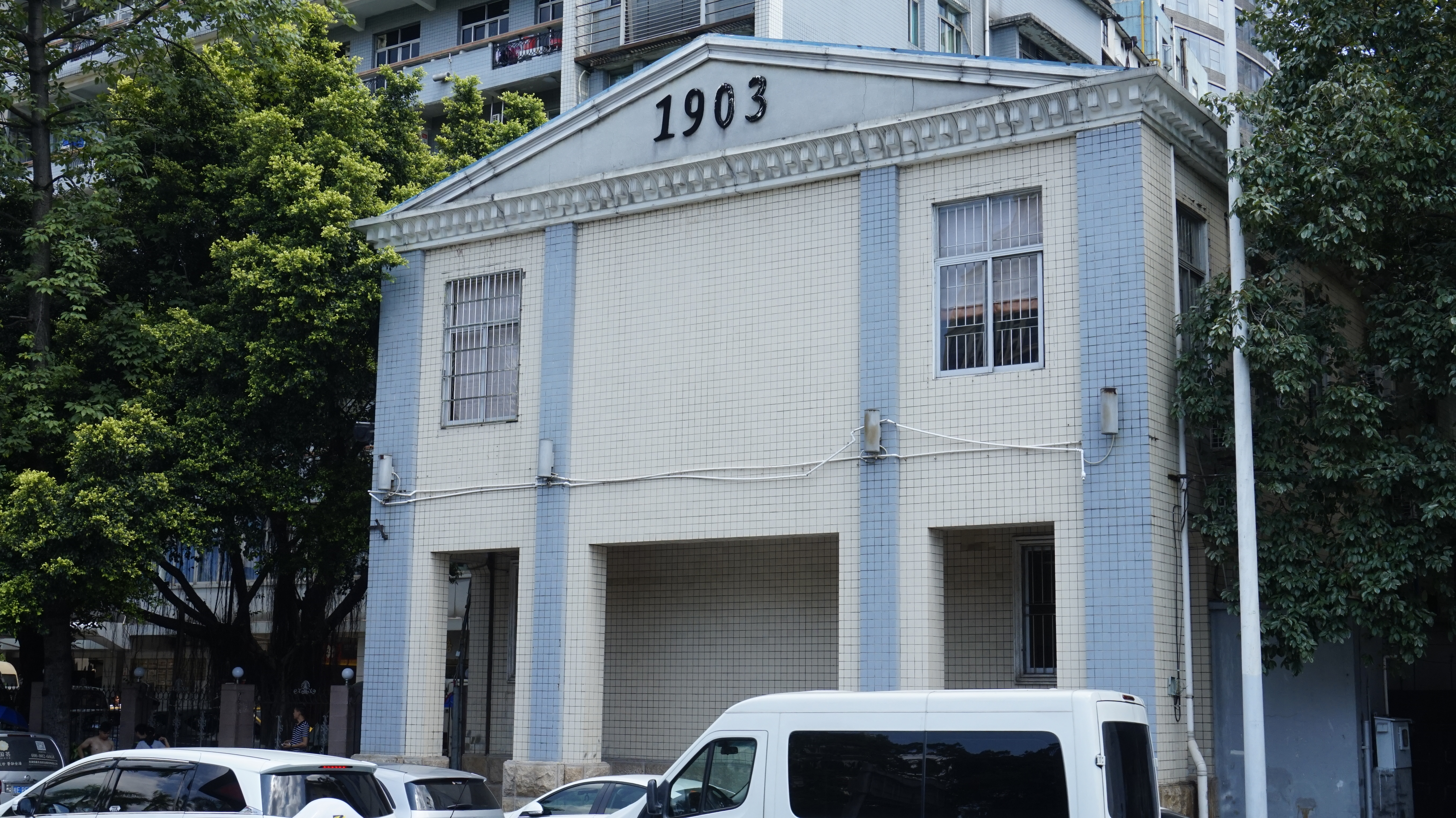
Former site of Hospital Franco-Chinois Paul Doumer, now a Guangzhou Municipal Cultural Relics Protection Unit

The First Affiliated Hospital of Guangzhou Medical University originated from the Hospital Franco-Chinois Paul Doumer, founded in Guangzhou by the French in 1903. The hospital was named after Paul Doumer, the then Governor-General of French Indochina and later President of France.

During the Anti-Japanese War (1937-1945), the hospital was bombed by the Japanese army. During the Republic of China period before 1949, many important military and political figures in Guangzhou were treated or rescued at the hospital.

In March 1951, the Hospital was renamed "Guangzhou Workers' Hospital".

In 1969, it was renamed the "Fourth People's Hospital of Guangzhou".

In 1973, the hospital's book Diagnosis and Treatment of Chronic Bronchitis Using Integrated Traditional Chinese and Western Medicine won the first prize at the China National Science Conference.

In 1974, the hospital came under the jurisdiction of Guangzhou Medical College and was renamed the "Affiliated Hospital of Guangzhou Medical College".

In 1981, it was renamed the "First Affiliated Hospital of Guangzhou Medical College".

In October 1993, it was rated as a Grade A tertiary hospital.

On June 15, 2001, the Haiyin Campus was put into use.

On October 7, 2009, the new inpatient building of the Yanjiang Campus was put into use.

In 2013, the hospital was renamed to the "First Affiliated Hospital of Guangzhou Medical University".

In July 2020, the National Health Commission proposed to establish the National Respiratory Medicine Center with the First Affiliated Hospital of Guangzhou Medical College as the main body, which together with the China-Japan Friendship Hospital constitutes the National Respiratory Medicine Center.

On September 25, 2021, the Datansha Campus of the hospital (Guangzhou Laboratory and Clinical Base of the National Respiratory Medicine Center of the First Affiliated Hospital of Guangzhou Medical University) was officially completed.

In 2024, Hengqin Hospital in Zhuhai was officially handed over to the First Affiliated Hospital of Guangzhou Medical University and became its Hengqin branch Hospital.

In February 2026, the First Affiliated Hospital of Guangzhou Medical University established a Rare Disease Medical Center.

== Current situation ==
The First Affiliated Hospital of Guangzhou Medical University is a large comprehensive Grade A tertiary hospital integrating medical treatment, teaching, scientific research, health care, rehabilitation and pre-hospital care. It is also the hosting institution of the Institute of Respiratory Health, the National Clinical Research Center for Respiratory Disease, and the State Key Laboratory of Respiratory Disease. And there are 12 national-level platforms. It is also one of the 13 National Centers for Clinical Medical Research.

There are 1500 inpatient beds, 44 clinical departments and a number of high-tech facilities such as PET/CT, 3.0T MR, DSA.

In the recent years, the hospital made significant contributions in fighting against the SARS, avian influenza, and the Covid-19 pandemic. It ranked number 1 in Respiratory Medicine in China for fifteen years running, and number 5 in Thoracic surgery.

The First Affiliated Hospital of Guangzhou Medical University published 55 papers listed in Nature Index for the Time frame of 1 January 2025 - 31 December 2025, ranking 208th globally and 83rd in China in healthcare.

== Campuses ==
The hospital has the following campuses or branches.

- Yanjiang Campus, or Riverside Campus, is the main campus. It is located at No. 151 Yanjiang West Road, Yuexiu District, Guangzhou.
- Huadiwan Campus: No.3, Huadi Rd. Liwan, Guangzhou
- Haiyin Campus: No. 1 Kangda Road, Haizhu District, Guangzhou
- Datansha Campus: No. 28 Qiaozhong Middle Road, Liwan District, Guangzhou
- Hengqin Campus: No.118, Baoxing Road, Hengqin, Guangdong–Macao Deep Cooperation Zone.

== Notable figures ==
- Zhong Nanshan, academician of the Chinese Academy of Engineering, medical scientist, professor. Currently working as an expert outpatient physician at the First Affiliated Hospital of Guangzhou Medical University. He was elected into Time's The 100 Most Influential People in the World of 2020. In the same year, Zhong was bestowed by Chairman Xi Jinping the Medal of the Republic, the highest honorary medal of the People's Republic of China.

== See also ==
- Guangzhou Medical University
- List of hospitals in China
