= Journal of Thoracic Disease =

- Discipline: Pulmonology
- Language: English
- Edited by: Zhong Nanshan

Publication details
- History: Dec. 2009–present
- Publisher: AME Publishing Company
- Frequency: Monthly
- Open access: Yes
- Impact factor: 2.365 (2016)

Standard abbreviations
- ISO 4: J. Thorac. Dis.

Indexing
- ISSN: 2072-1439 (print); 2077-6624 (web)
- LCCN: 2011243245

Links
- Journal homepage; Online archive

The Journal of Thoracic Disease is a peer-reviewed open access medical journal covering pulmonology. It was established in December 2009 and is published monthly by AME Publishing Company. It is the official journal of the State Key Laboratory of Respiratory Disease, the Guangzhou Institute of Respiratory Disease, the First Affiliated Hospital of Guangzhou Medical University, and the Society for Thoracic Disease. The editor-in-chief is Zhong Nanshan (Guangzhou Institute of Respiratory Diseases). According to the Journal Citation Reports, the journal has a 2016 impact factor of 2.365.
