= Zhong Nanshan =

Chinese pulmonologist

Professor Zhong Nanshan FRCPE FRCP FRCPI
- 钟南山
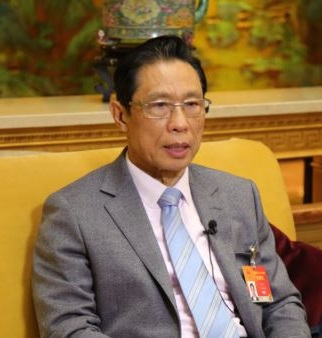
- Zhong in 2015

Member to the National People's Congress (11th, 12th)
- In office March 2008 – March 2018
- Chairman: Wu Bangguo→Zhang Dejiang

Member of the National Committee of the Chinese People's Political Consultative Conference (8th, 9th, 10th)
- In office March 1993 – March 2008
- Chairman: Li Ruihuan→Jia Qinglin

Delegate to the National Congress of the Chinese Communist Party (17th)
- In office 1997–2002
- General Secretary: Hu Jintao

Personal details
- Born: 20 October 1936 (age 90) Nanjing, Jiangsu, China
- Party: Chinese Communist Party
- Spouse: Li Shaofen (m. 1963)
- Children: 3
- Education: Peking University Health Science Center; University of Edinburgh Medical School
- Occupation: pulmonologist
- Awards: Medal of the Republic (2020)
- Scientific career
- Known for: Discovering the SARS coronavirus
- Fields: Pulmonology, respiratory diseases
- Workplaces: Guangzhou Institute of Respiratory Diseases; Guangzhou Medical University

Chinese name
- Simplified Chinese: 钟南山
- Traditional Chinese: 鍾南山
- Literal meaning: Zhong South-mountain
Transcriptions
Standard Mandarin
- Hanyu Pinyin: Zhōng Nánshān
- IPA: [ʈʂʊ́ŋ nǎnʂán]
Yue: Cantonese
- Yale Romanization: Jūng Nàahm-sāan
- Jyutping: Zung^{1} Naam^{4}-saan^{1}
- IPA: [tsʊŋ˥ nam˩san˥]
Southern Min
- Hokkien POJ: Cheng Lâm-soaⁿ

Zhong Nanshan (born 20 October 1936) is a Chinese pulmonologist. He was president of the Chinese Medical Association from 2005 to 2009 and is currently the editor-in-chief of the Journal of Thoracic Disease. Zhong was bestowed the Medal of the Republic, the highest honorary medal of the People's Republic of China, in August 2020.

Zhong earned international fame for managing the SARS outbreak and was renowned for refuting the official line which downplayed the severity of the crisis. He was voted one of China's top 10 scientists in 2010.

During the COVID-19 pandemic which was first identified in Wuhan, Hubei, Zhong was a leading advisor in managing the crisis, suggesting evidence-based control measures to contain the disease and sharing the successful treatment plan with the international community. He was named by Time as one of the 100 most influential people in the world in 2020.

== Early life and education ==
Zhong was born on 20 October 1936 at the Central Hospital in Nanjing. Because the hospital is located south of Zhongshan in Nanjing, his parents named him "Nanshan" according to the location of his birthplace, though his family was from Fujian province. He was educated at Beijing Medical University, where he finished his residency training in internal medicine. After graduating from university in 1960, Zhong Nanshan had few opportunities to participate in clinical medicine. He once taught medicine, worked as a worker, and edited the school newspaper until he was transferred back to the Affiliated Hospital of Guangzhou Medical College in 1971. Zhong completed further training at St Bartholomew's Hospital in London and the University of Edinburgh Medical School between 1979 and 1981, graduating from the University of Edinburgh Medical School with an MD in 1981.

== Career ==
Zhong Nanshan was awarded the title of one of the first batch of national-level experts with outstanding contributions in 1984. Served as graduate tutor in 1985.In 1995, he became a doctoral supervisor. In May 1996, he was elected as an academician of the Chinese Academy of Engineering. Zhong became president of the Chinese Thoracic Society in 2000 and became president of the Chinese Medical Association in 2005. He is currently the director of the Guangzhou Institute of Respiratory Diseases and editor-in-chief of the Journal of Thoracic Disease. Zhong discovered the relationship between protein malnutrition and COPD and has developed a calibrated formula on energy consumption for patients with COPD.

=== SARS outbreak ===
When Zhong directed the Guangzhou Institute of Respiratory Diseases, they received the second case of a SARS patient as early as 20 December 2002. Over the next month, 28 similar cases were reported in Zhongshan alone, and on 21 January 2003, Zhong and other doctors and researchers in related fields reported this disease at an emergency meeting and gave it the name atypical pneumonia.

On 28 January 2003, Zhong felt sick and discovered that he had caught pneumonia. Concerned that the news that a leading researcher and doctor for respiratory diseases falling ill during the SARS outbreak would cause fear and panic for the general public, Zhong decided to not receive treatment in the hospital. Instead he returned home, hoping that it was not caused by SARS and that he could recover without treatment. With care from his wife, Li Shaofen, he managed to recover after eight days. After recovery he immediately returned to the Guangzhou Institute of Respiratory Diseases to direct the fight against SARS. On 11 February 2003, at a press conference held by the Guangdong Department of Health, Zhong explained the disease and its symptoms, and calmed the public by asserting that it was "preventable" and "curable".

Zhong, for the first time while treating SARS patients, employed non-invasive ventilation methods that increased the amount of oxygen that the patients could take in and alleviated pain. Zhong also insisted on proposing the use of cortisone for the treating of patients experiencing severe conditions, which significantly lowered the death rate of severe patients to 13% and decreased the total treatment time.

The decision to use cortisone was politically controversial at the time. In February 2003 the Chinese Center for Disease Control and Prevention had already published the authoritative view that normal Chlamydia was the direct cause of atypical pneumonia and, as a result, the only legally prescribed way of treating SARS patients was to use antibiotics. Based on observations of hundreds of patients in Guangdong, Zhong was determined to advocate for the moderate usage of cortisone. Zhong said later in an interview that he knew this might bring dishonor and defamation, but he persisted because he trusted in his observations and scientific judgements regarding the disease.

With the support of the Guangdong government and the positive results in Guangdong in the treating of SARS disease, Zhong's method was later used as the standard protocol for treating all SARS patients in China.

When delegates led by Dr. Evans from the World Health Organization visited China in early April, Zhong presented the characteristics of SARS as well as the treatment and prevention method in China. Zhong's presentation was well-received and his methods were adopted around the world.

=== COVID-19 ===
In early January 2020, Zhong visited Wuhan, in response to a growing cluster of then-unidentified pneumonia cases, and was reassured by city health officials that the disease was controllable and preventable. On 20 January, however, he returned to Wuhan, to re-evaluate the situation, and came to the conclusion that the novel coronavirus was more transmissible than previously identified, and warned the Central Committee of the Chinese Communist Party that authorities in Wuhan were likely understating the severity of the outbreak, and on the same day, publicly announced on state television the same. In later reporting of his state TV broadcast he recommended that "a quarantine period of 10 days to two weeks is very effective, so there will not be a large-scale infection as people travel back from their holidays" but also concluded with the prediction that "the virus outbreak may recede in a week to 10 days."

Zhong has compiled a coronavirus diagnosis and treatment protocol, and has made great contributions to the prevention and control of epidemics, treatment of severe cases, and COVID-19 research. In August 2020, he received from Chinese leader Xi Jinping the Medal of the Republic, the highest state honor, for his outstanding contribution to fighting the COVID-19 epidemic.

During the pandemic, Zhong had promoted publicly the usage of a controversial traditional Chinese medicine of Lianhua Qingwen capsule for treating COVID-19 infection. Though later he had denied any commercial tie with the pharmaceutical company that supplies the capsule, on 4 May 2021, an article from Retraction Watch showed that Zhong and his coworkers were financially tied to the Yiling Pharmaceutical company that supplies the capsule.

In 2020, Zhong worked with Tencent to establish an AI Joint Lab to conduct research on disease screening, prevention, and outbreak warnings. Zhong also worked on pandemic research projects with Foxconn and Alibaba Cloud.

== Honors ==
Awards and Prizes
- 2021: Asian Scientist 100, Asian Scientist
- 2020: Grand Lotus Medal of Honour (GML)
- 2020: Order of the Republic
- 2016: Guanghua Engineering Science and Technology Prize
- 2007: WAO Awards for Distinguished Recognition
- 2005: National Role Model of Labors
- 1997: National Award for Advances in Science and Technology, China

On 12 December 2020, the Affiliated High School of South China Normal University unveiled a bronze statue of Zhong Nanshan was unveiled on its 132nd anniversary.

Paper of the Year
- The Lancet; 2008: The editorial board praised Zhong and his team, as they "clarified that carbocisteine can prevent the worsening of chronic obstructive pulmonary disease and can improve life at an affordable price, which is of great significance to developing countries." (Note: The editorial board selected six papers for readers to vote, and announced two winners, one selected by the editorial board and one with the highest reader votes. Zhong's paper obtained the highest number of votes.)

Professional Titles
- 1989: Fellow of the American College of Chest Physicians
- 1993: Member of the European Respiratory Society
- 2005: Fellow of the Royal College of Physicians of Ireland
- 2011: Fellow of the Royal College of Physicians of Edinburgh
- 201?: Fellow of the Royal College of Physicians of London

Honorary Degrees
- 2005: Honorary Fellow of Hong Kong Academy of Medicine
- 2008: Honorary Fellow of the European Respiratory Society
- 2011: Honorary Doctor of Science, University of Birmingham
- 2013: Honorary Doctor of Science, The Chinese University of Hong Kong

Professional Societies
- 1985–1990: Member, WHO Advisory Panel on Smoking & Health
- 1982–1985: Member, Executive Committee, Chinese Medical Association
- 1989–2000: Member, Executive Committee, American College of Chest Physicians
- 1989–present: Fellow, American College of Chest Physicians (FCCP)

== Personal life ==
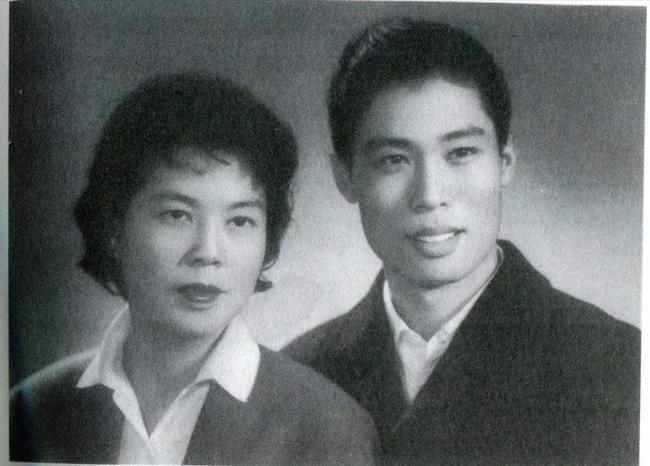
Zhong Nanshan and Li Shaofen in 1963

Zhong was an outstanding college athlete in the 1950s. The Beijing Municipal Track and Field Team attempted to recruit him as a full-time athlete, but he was determined to become a doctor and declined the offer. Through his sports connection, he was introduced to Li Shaofen, a basketball player who was a member of the China women's national basketball team for 13 years. And won the 1964 French "Four Nations" women's basketball championship. But because Li Shaofen was a member of the national women's basketball team at the time and could not get married, Zhong Nanshan waited for her for eight years. They married on 31 December 1963. They have two children: son Zhong Weide, a physician, who is a doctor in the Urology Department of Guangzhou First People's Hospital and the absolute main force of the hospital's basketball team, and daughter Zhong Weiyue, a swimmer, once won the short course world championship. His father, Zhong Shifan, is a doctor of medicine from the State University of New York and a pediatric medical expert. His mother, Liao Yueqin, graduated from Peking Union Medical College and is the founder of Guangdong Cancer Hospital.

== See also ==
- Carlo Urbani, doctor who was the first to identify SARS and died of the disease in 2003
- Chen Wei, medical researcher who won multiple national awards
- Li Lanjuan, medical researcher who won multiple national awards

Academic offices
Previous: Zhang Wenkang	President of Chinese Medical Association; 2005–2010	Next: Chen Zhu
