= Zhong Weiyue =

Chinese swimmer (born 1975)

Zhong Weiyue (钟惟月, born 1975), also known as Nora Zhong, is a retired Chinese swimmer. She was the first Chinese swimmer convicted of doping.

In January 1994, at Stop 2 of 1994 FINA Swimming World Cup in Beijing, she set short course world records in the 50 and 100-meter butterfly at the age of 18. Her records were annulled in February by FINA after she failed a dope test when her urine samples contained higher than normal levels of testosterone-epitestosterone. She became the first Chinese swimmer convicted of doping and was banned for two years.

Her parents are Li Shaofen and Zhong Nanshan. She studied accounting at the University of Southern California. As of 2025, she worked in the administration of medical science research organisations in Canton.
