= Lianhua Qingwen =

Traditional Chinese medicine formulation used for the treatment of influenza

Alternative medicine
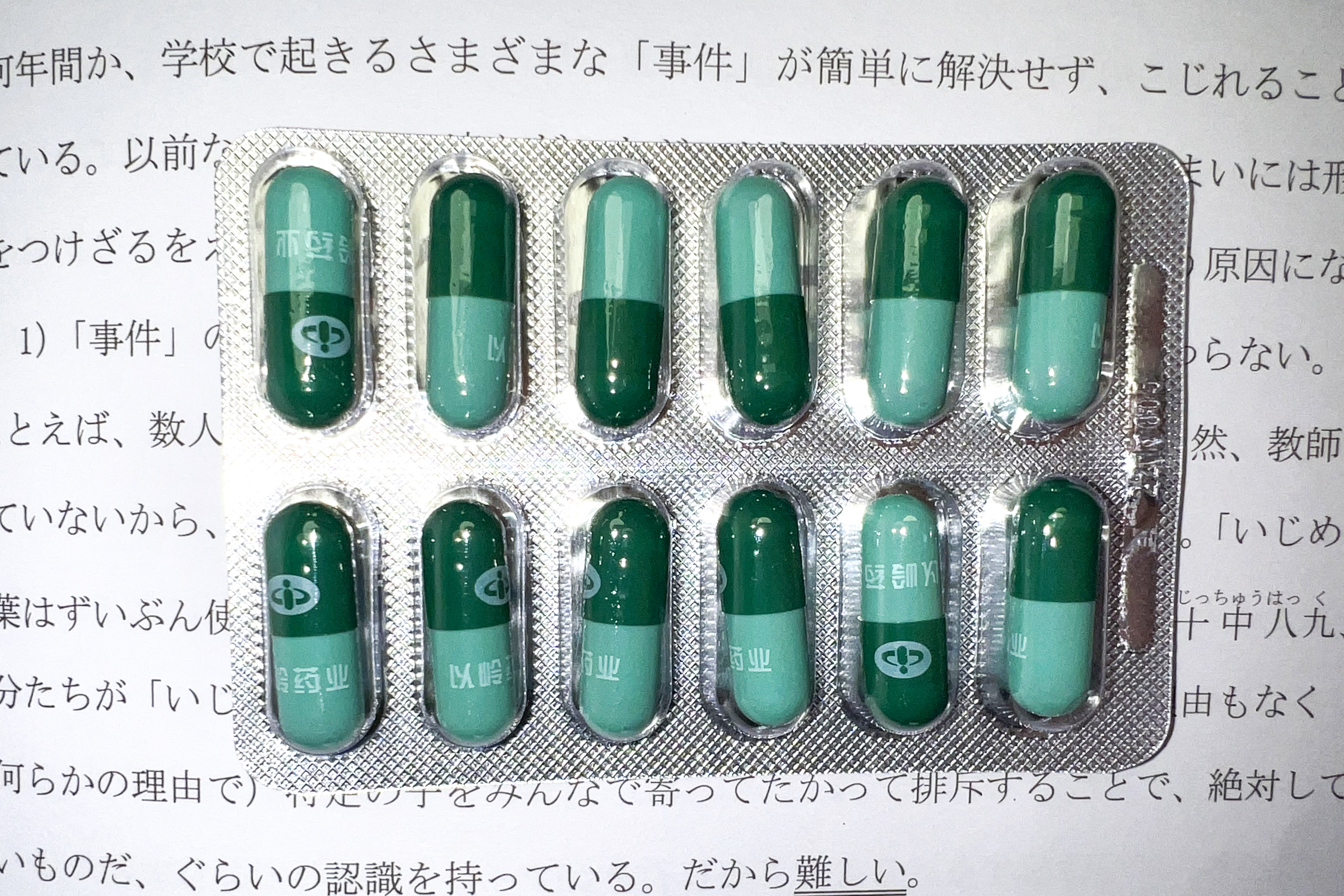
- Classification: Traditional Chinese medicine (TCM)
- Modality: Capsule and granular
- Claims: Treatment against various respiratory diseases including influenza, severe acute respiratory syndrome, and COVID-19
- Year proposed: 2003
- Original proponents: Shijiazhuang Yiling Pharmaceutical

Lianhua Qingwen (simplified Chinese: 连花清瘟; traditional Chinese: 連花清瘟; lit. 'medicine using Forsythia suspensa and Lonicera japonica to clear epidemic', LHQW) is a traditional Chinese medicine (TCM) formulation used for the treatment of influenza.

== Background ==
Lianhua Qingwen was developed by Shijiazhuang Yiling Pharmaceutical in 2003 as a treatment for severe acute respiratory syndrome (SARS) following the outbreak of the disease in 2002 and was listed by the National Health Commission of China in 2004 as a treatment for influenza and other respiratory disease. Its formulation includes 13 herbs and minerals which are said to have been used in Chinese traditional medicine as early as the Han dynasty.

The medication is approved in China as a Chinese patent medicine. As a result, the package insert includes a list of herbs, but not their amounts. Sources of its formulation reportedly consist of:

- 北板蓝根 Isatis root
- 连翘 Weeping forsythia
- 金银花 Lonicera japonica
- 炙麻黄 Ephedra
- 甘草 Licorice root
- 绵马贯众 Male fern rhizome
- 石膏 Gypsum fibrosum
- 广藿香 Cablin patchouli herb
- 红景天 Herba rhodiolae
- 鱼腥草 Houttuynia cordata
- 大黄 Rhubarb root and rhizome
- 炒苦杏仁 Bitter apricot kernel
- 薄荷醇 menthol

The medicine is both in capsule and granular form.

=== Ethnopharamacology ===
Being approved as a Chinese patent medicine, LHQW also needs to have information regarding its supposed function in the practice of TCM. The package insert text reads:

[Functions and Indications] Clears epidemics and removes toxins. Ventilates lung and discharges heat. Used to treat influenza of the heat-toxin invading lung pattern, with symptoms such as: fever or high fever, aversion to cold, muscle soreness and pain, nasal congestion and runny nose, coughing, headache, dry and sore throat, reddish tongue, yellow or greasy yellow tongue coating, etc. Addition approved in April 2020: In the routine treatment of novel coronavirus pneumonia, it can be used for fever, cough, and fatigue caused by mild and moderate types.

== Contraindication ==
Lianhua Qingwen should be avoided for patients with G6PD deficiency, since its active ingredient, Lonicera japonica, will lead to hemolysis to such patients.

Due to the inclusion of Ephedra, people with high blood pressure, anxiety, history of seizures, irregular heart beats, or other heart conditions, should avoid taking Linhua Qingwen.

== Adverse effects ==
The official package insert of LHQW states that the adverse effects are "unclear". A January 2022 meta-analysis from China reports that it may cause GI discomfort, rashes and itches, dry mouth, and dizziness.

== Uses and controversies of Lianhua Qingwen in relation to COVID-19, by region ==
=== In China ===
During the COVID-19 pandemic, the government of the People's Republic of China (PRC) approved the use of Lianhua Qingwen for mild to moderate COVID-19 cases in January 2020, and promotes the use of the medicine abroad.

In March 2022, during the Shanghai COVID-19 outbreak, the medication was distributed en masse to residents. Reports emerged indicating that this process consumed significant logistical capacity, drawing criticism about misuse of resources at a time when people were struggling with shortages of basic needs such as food and medication. An article on telemedicine and medical news platform Dr. Lilac pointed out that there was no scientific evidence available to indicate that LHQW was effective as prophylaxis to prevent infection, nor did there exist any official government recommendation for such usage; instead, taking the drug unnecessarily carried a risk of side effects. It argued that there was thus no reasonable basis for the mass distribution of the medication to healthy individuals to begin with, let alone doing so in a way that took up transportation capacity and resources that were urgently needed elsewhere.

Lianhua Qingwen has also been promoted and distributed by the government in Hong Kong (HK). The pro-establishment DAB alliance was found to have distributed unregistered doses of LHQW, in breach of health regulations.

==== Conflict of Interest Controversy ====
In April 2022, the Financial Times reported that the leading COVID-19 health official in the PRC, the famous epidemiologist and pulmonologist Zhong Nanshan - who has also been the most prominent scientific promoter of Lianhua Qingwen - had undisclosed prior investments in large stakeholdings in corporations producing Lianhua Qingwen and other treatments under question. As the Financial Times report showed, these appeared to be serious conflicts of interest as the investments benefited from the PRC and HK governments' rapid approval and then widespread national & international promotion of Lianhua Qingwen and other suspect treatments for purportedly helping COVID-19 sufferers.

A 2020 "randomized controlled trial" of LHQW involving Zhong was also found in April 2022 to have undisclosed funding from Yiling Pharmaceuticals, forcing an erratum. Retraction Watch also notes that author Jia Zheng-hua is the son-in-law of Wu Yi-ling, the founder of the company in question.

=== Elsewhere in Asia ===
In the Philippines, its Food and Drug Administration approved Lianhua Qingwen on 7 August 2020 as a traditional herbal product that helps remove "heat-toxin invasion of the lungs, including symptoms such as fever, aversion to cold, muscle soreness, stuffy and runny nose". It is not registered as a COVID-19 medication, and a doctor's prescription is required for its use. A Filipino TCM physician interviewed by ABS-CBN clarified that although the medicine can be used for symptomatic treatment of flu-like symptoms in COVID-19 patients, it is not an antibiotic nor anti-viral, and cannot cure the disease itself. It cannot be taken as prophylaxis or as a health supplement.

In Singapore, the Health Sciences Authority has issued an advisory to clarify that although it has been approved for sale as a Chinese proprietary medicine for the relief of cold and flu symptoms, Lianhua Qingwen is not approved to treat or alleviate symptoms of COVID-19. It warned that sellers who make claims that it can prevent, protect against or treat COVID-19 may face prosecution.

In Cambodia at least 50,000 boxes were handed over to the Ministry of Health around April 2021, but it remains unclear both who the sponsor of the donation was, exactly how many capsules were donated and where the products were to be put to clinical use. After local pharmaceutical distributor Argon, a subsidiary of Dynamic Group claimed exclusive rights to distribute the product, a number of private importers and online resellers were shut down.

=== North America ===
Although the medicine has been allowed to be sold in Canada since 2012, Health Canada has cautioned against the use of the Chinese traditional medicine to prevent, treat, and cure COVID-19. In the United States, the FDA is advising consumers not to purchase or use Lianhua Qingwen, stating that it has not been approved or authorized by FDA and is being misleadingly represented as safe and/or effective for the treatment or prevention of COVID-19.

=== Australia ===
In Australia, the Therapeutic Goods Administration has not given approval to Lianhua Qingwen, as it contains ephedra, a key ingredient used to make the drug methamphetamine. Despite the ban, Lianhua Qingwen has been sold illegally in Australia as a COVID-19 treatment.

== See also ==
- NRICM101
