= NRICM101 =

Traditional Chinese medicine formula to target COVID-19

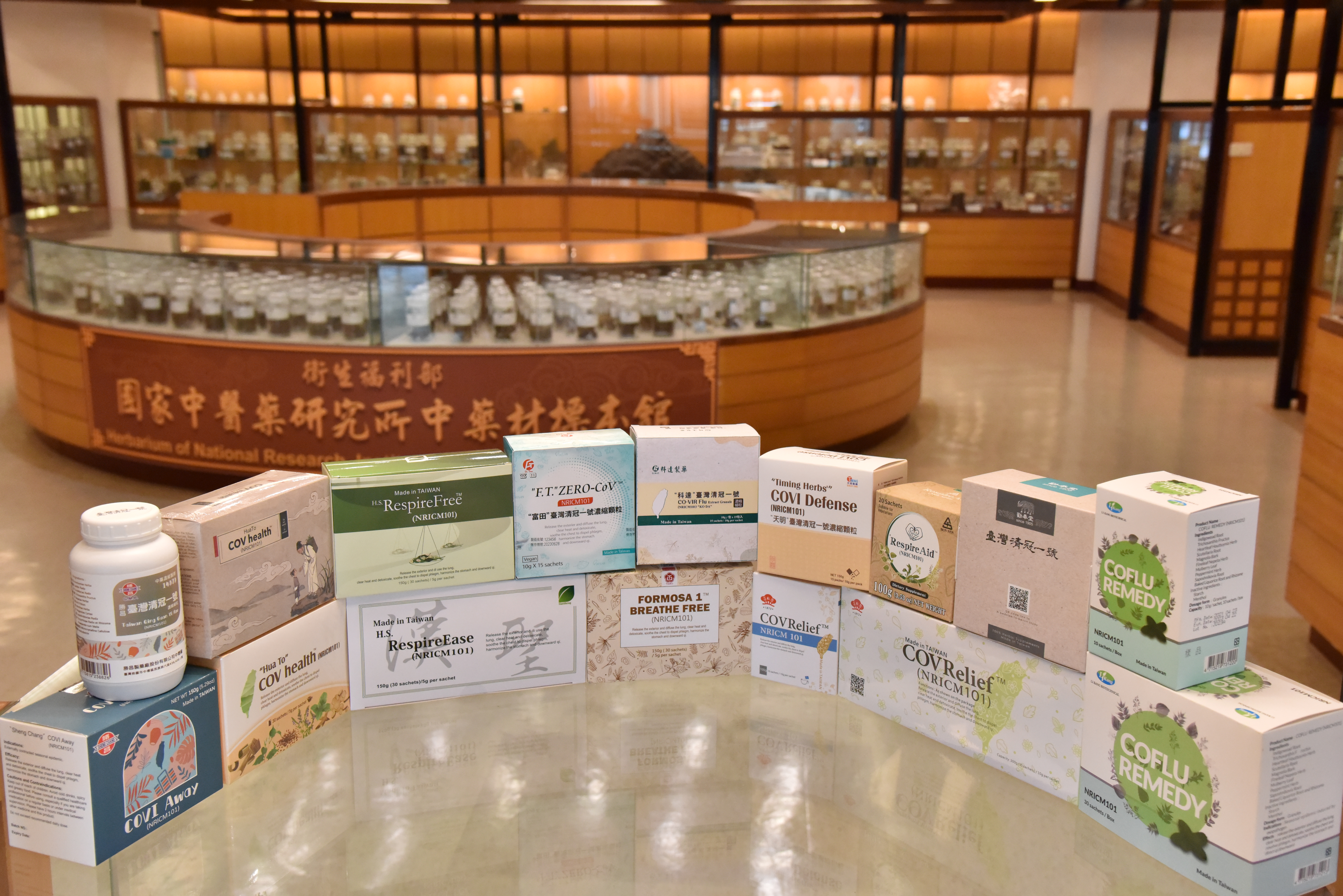
11 formulations based on the NRICM101 prescription

NRICM101 (Chinese: 清冠一號; pinyin: Qīngguàn yī hào), is a treatment for COVID-19 developed in Taiwan using Traditional Chinese Medicine (TCM), created by the National Research Institute of Chinese Medicine (NRICM), a governmental body of Taiwan. The prescription has gained legal approval in several countries, the first TCM recipe to do so for COVID-19 treatment. In its native Taiwan, the treatment is used in conjunction with vaccinations. Amongst the formulations available are RespireAid from Sun Ten, and COVRelief from Chuang Song Zong.

The formula is provided in granule form, which is common for Chinese patent medicine.

== Formulation ==
NRICM101 contains 10 herbal medicinal components, including:

- 黃芩 (Scutellaria baicalensis root)
- 魚腥草 (Houttuynia cordata, heartleaf)
- 栝蔞實 (Mongolian snakegourd fruit)
- 北板藍根 (Indigowoad root)
- 厚朴 (Magnolia bark)
- 薄荷 (Peppermint herb)
- 荊芥 (Fineleaf nepeta)
- 桑葉 (Mulberry leaf)
- 防風 (Saposhnikovia root)
- 甘草 (Baked liquorice root)

== Method of action ==
According to the NRICM, the herbal medicine is supposed to work by preventing the SARS-CoV2 virus from binding with ACE2. This would reduce the chance of severe illness.

== Legal status ==
On 2021 May 18, Taiwan licensed NRICM101 for distribution under emergency access policy.

It is licensed as a herbal drug in Singapore, Thailand, and Australia. It is registered as a herbal granule in the Philippines.

It is registered as a dietary supplement or a "health food" in the EU and in Cambodia. It has also obtained licenses for importing into the U.S., the UK, Canada, and South Africa.

Bringing NRICM101 into Argentina is illegal.

== NRICM102 ==
In October 2021, a new formula called NRICM102 was released. Five herbs were changed in the new formula. Whereas NRICM101 is intended for mild-and-moderate cases, NRICM102 is intended for severe-to-critical cases, corresponding to score ranges of 1-4 and 5-7 on the WHO Clinical Progression Scale for Covid-19. The NRICM warns that the new formula is only suitable for severe cases and must not be produced and used without the approval of a TCM practitioner.

== Studies and efficacy ==
The NRICM has held press conferences on the results of preclinical and clinical studies involving NRICM101 and NRICM102. Not all results are subsequently published in a peer-reviewed journal, and no high-quality meta-analysis has been done on what little has been published. As a result, it is difficult to draw much conclusion about their efficacy or safety.

== See also ==
- Lianhua Qingwen
