= Li Fanghua =

Chinese physicist (1932–2020)

- 李方华
- Born: January 6, 1932; British Hong Kong
- Died: January 24, 2020 (aged 88); Beijing, China
- Education: Sun Yat-sen University; Wuhan University; Saint Petersburg State University
- Spouse: Fan Haifu
- Awards: L'Oréal-UNESCO Awards for Women in Science (2003)
- Scientific career
- Fields: Electron microscope
- Workplaces: Chinese Academy of Sciences; The World Academy of Sciences

Chinese name
- Traditional Chinese: 李方華
- Simplified Chinese: 李方华
Transcriptions
Standard Mandarin
- Hanyu Pinyin: Lǐ Fānghuá

Li Fanghua (Chinese: 李方华; 6 January 1932 – 24 January 2020) was a Hong Kong-born Chinese physicist. She was a member of the Chinese Academy of Sciences, The World Academy of Sciences, and the International Union of Crystallography. She was also the director of Chinese Society of Physics and China Union of Crystallography, and an editor of the Journal of Chinese Electron Microscopy Society, J. Electron Microscopy, Chinese Physics Letter, and Chinese Journal of Physics.

Li won the L'Oréal-UNESCO Awards for Women in Science in 2003. She was fluent in English, French, German, Japanese, and Russian.

== Biography ==
=== Studies and research ===
The Cultural Revolution (1966–1976) interrupted her studies; ultimately she accessed the Leningrad University's library to continue studies.

== Honors and awards ==
- 2001 Elected one of the Top 10 Outstanding Women by the Chinese Academy of Sciences

== Personal life ==
Li was married to fellow physicist Fan Haifu.
