= AME Publishing Company =

Academic publishing company

- Founded: July 2009
- Founder: Stephen Wang
- Headquarters location: Hong Kong
- Official website: https://www.amegroups.com/

AME Publishing Company is an academic publishing company, which publishes medical journals and books. Founded in July 2009, it is currently headquartered in Hong Kong, with additional offices in Guangzhou, Changsha, Nanjing, Shanghai, Chengdu, Beijing, Taipei, and Hangzhou. Its name stands for "Academic Made Easy/Excellent/Enthusiastic". It has published over 50 medical journals, as well as 20 English-language books, 28 Chinese-language books, and 60 e-books.

It was included on Beall's list of predatory publishers. Although the publisher did not make an official response statement, one of its journals subsequently published a commissioned editorial skeptical of the list. In 2020 it signed up to the Publons review tracking service in order to improve its peer review processes.

== Journals ==
The company currently publishes over 60 medical journals:

- AME Case Reports
- AME Medical Journal
- AME Surgical Journal
- Annals of Blood
- Annals of Breast Surgery
- Annals of Cancer Epidemiology
- Annals of Cardiothoracic Surgery
- Annals of Esophagus
- Annals of Eye Science
- Annals of Infection
- Annals of Joint
- Annals of Laparoscopic and Endoscopic Surgery
- Annals of Lymphoma
- Annals of Nasopharynx Cancer
- Annals of Palliative Medicine
- Annals of Pancreatic Cancer
- Annals of Research Hospitals
- Annals of Thyroid
- Annals of Translational Medicine
- Art of Surgery
- Australian Journal of Otolaryngology
- Biotarget
- Bone & Joint Investigation
- Cardiovascular Diagnosis and Therapy
- Chinese Clinical Oncology
- Current Challenges in Thoracic Surgery
- Digestive Medicine Research
- ExRNA
- Frontiers of Oral and Maxillofacial Medicine
- Gastrointestinal Stromal Tumor
- Gland Surgery
- Gynecology and Pelvic Medicine
- Health Technology
- Hepatobiliary Surgery and Nutrition
- Journal of Emergency and Critical Care Medicine
- Journal of Gastrointestinal Oncology
- Journal of Hospital Management and Health Policy
- Journal of Laboratory and Precision Medicine
- Journal of Medical Artificial Intelligence
- Journal of Public Health and Emergency
- Journal of Spine Surgery
- Journal of Thoracic Disease
- Journal of Visualized Surgery
- Journal of Xiangya Medicine
- Laparoscopic Surgery
- Longhua Chinese Medicine
- Mediastinum
- Mesentery and Peritoneum
- mHealth
- Microphysiological Systems
- Non-coding RNA Investigation
- Pediatric Medicine
- Pharmacogenomics Research and Personalized Medicine
- Precision Cancer Medicine
- Quantitative Imaging in Medicine and Surgery
- Shanghai Chest
- Stem Cell Investigation
- Therapeutic Radiology and Oncology
- Translational Andrology and Urology
- Translational Breast Cancer Research
- Translational Cancer Research
- Translational Gastroenterology and Hepatology
- Translational Lung Cancer Research
- Translational Pediatrics
- Video-Assisted Thoracic Surgery
- 临床与病理杂志
- 眼科学报
