= Fan Haifu =

Chinese physicist (1933–2022)

- 范海福
- Born: 15 August 1933; Guangzhou, Guangdong, China
- Died: 8 July 2022 (aged 88); Beijing, China
- Education: Guangdong Experimental High School; Peking University
- Spouse: Li Fanghua
- Scientific career
- Fields: Crystallography
- Workplaces: Chinese Academy of Sciences; The World Academy of Sciences

Fan Haifu (Chinese: 范海福; pinyin: Fàn Haǐfú; 15 August 1933 – 8 July 2022) was a Chinese crystallographer, physicist, and writer. He was a member of the Chinese Academy of Sciences and The World Academy of Sciences.

== Biography ==
Fan was born and raised in Guangzhou, Guangdong, during the Republic of China. He secondary studied at Guangdong Experimental High School (Chinese: 广东实验中学). He graduated from Peking University in 1956, where he majored in chemistry. He studied chemistry and physics under Tang Youqi (Chinese: 唐有祺), Fu Ying (Chinese: 傅鹰), Xu Guangxian, Zhou Guangzhao, Chen Shaoli (Chinese: 陈绍礼), and Wu Qianzhang (Chinese: 吴乾章). After graduation, he applied for an internship in the Institute of Physics of the Chinese Academy of Sciences, and became a professor at University of Science and Technology of China and Sun Yat-sen University.

He was elected a fellow of the Chinese Academy of Sciences in 1991 and a fellow of the World Academy of Sciences in 2000. He is also a recipient of the 1996 TWAS Prize.

== Personal life ==
Fan married Li Fanghua, who was also a Chinese physicist.

== Book ==
- Physical and Non-Physical Methods of Solving Crystal Structures (collaboration with Michael Woolfson)

== Awards ==
- The Second Class Prize of Natural Sciences of China (1987)
- The TWAS award in physics (1996)
- The Tan Kah Kee Science Award in mathematics and physics (2006)
