= South China Normal University =

Provincial public university in Guangzhou, Guangdong, China

- 华南师范大学
- Motto in English: Foster the spirit of working hard; Pursue studies with utmost rigour; Seek truth from facts to blaze new trails; And be a model of virtue for others.
- Type: Public university
- Established: 1933; 93 years ago
- Affiliations: Guangdong-Hong Kong-Macao University Alliance (GHMUA)
- Location: Guangzhou, Guangdong, China; 23°08′11″N 113°20′59″E
- Website: scnu.edu.cn

Chinese name
- Simplified Chinese: 华南师范大学
- Traditional Chinese: 華南師範大學
Transcriptions
Standard Mandarin
- Hanyu Pinyin: Huánán Shīfàn Dàxué

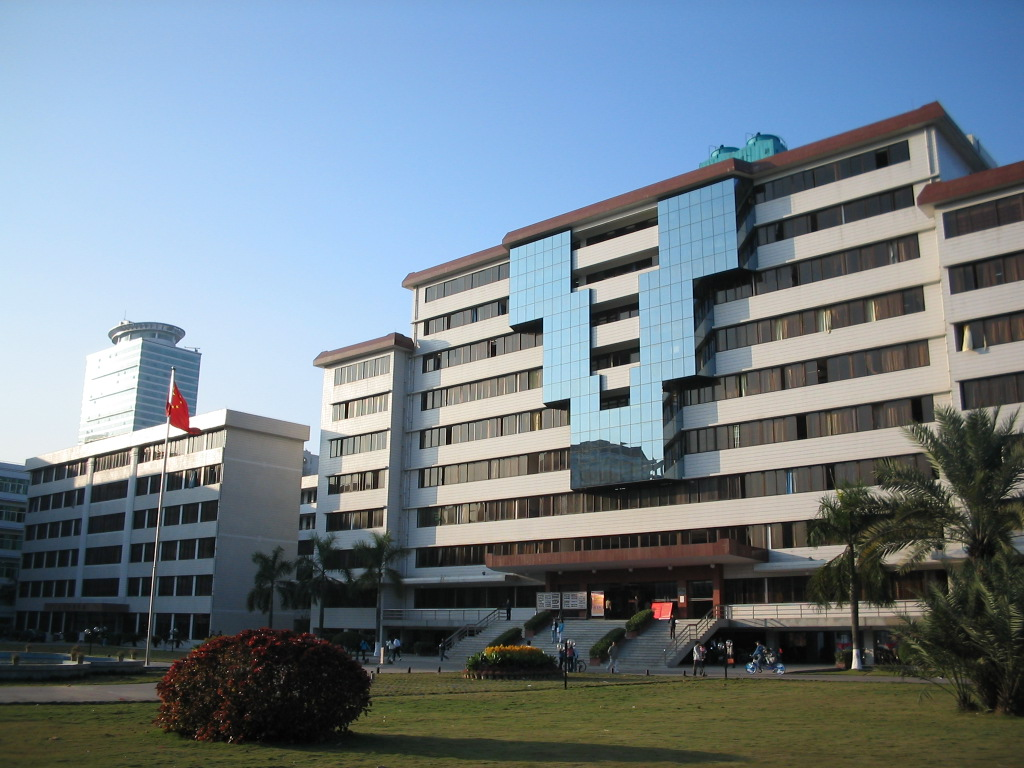
Administration Building

South China Normal University (SCNU) is a provincial public normal university in Guangzhou, Guangdong, China. It is affiliated with the Province of Guangdong, and co-sponsored by the provincial government and the Ministry of Education. The university is part of the Double First-Class Construction and Project 211.

The university is featured distinctively by both teaching and research, consisting of diverse branches of learning such as philosophy, economics, law, education, literature, history, science, technology, and management. There are also an elementary school and a middle school affiliated with this university.

== Motto ==
The school has changed its name and moved several times over the span of 80 years. Although it has gone through major changes, it has never stopped. The university bolsters a tradition of "researching advanced academics and nurturing professional talents in the society", and inherited Southern University's revolutionary spirit of "loyalty, unity, simplicity and humility, hardworking and courage, seeking truth from facts". The school motto promotes arduous struggle, rigorous academic research, truth-seeking and innovation, and being a good example of others".

== History ==
University Timeline
Date	Name
August 1933	Teachers' College of Xiangqin University
March 1935	Education College of Xiangqin University
September 1938	Guangdong Provincial College of Education
September 1939	Guangdong Provincial College of Arts & Science
October 1950	Guangdong College of Arts & Science
June 1951	Teachers' College of Sun Yet-sen University
October 1951	South China Teacher's College
October 1970	Guangdong Teacher's College
November 1977	South China Teacher's College
October 1982	South China Normal University

== Location and campus ==
The university has four campuses:

- Main campus (Shipai campus), Tianhe District, Guangzhou, Guangdong
- HEMC (Guangzhou Higher Education Mega Center) campus, Panyu District, Guangzhou, Guangdong
- Nanhai campus, Nanhai District, Foshan, Guangdong
- Shanwei campus, Chengqu district, Shanwei, Guangdong

== Administration ==
South China Normal University (SCNU) was founded in 1933, before which it was named Guangdong Provincial Teacher's College of Xiangqin University. It became a member of Project 211 in 1996, after which it was constructed and supported by People's Government and Ministry of Education in Guangdong Province in 2015. In 2017, SCNU became a member of the country's Double First-Class Construction. South China Normal University provides a variety of subjects, including philosophy, economics, law, education, literature, history, science, technology, agriculture, medical, management and art.

South China Normal University has more than 30 schools and colleges, and offers 84 undergraduate programs, over 200 graduate programs, and over 100 doctoral programs. In 2017, there were 24,894 undergraduates, 7553 postgraduates and 842 doctoral candidates. There are approximately 1000 long-term international students from more than 100 countries every year.

The university has a group of highly qualified experts, professors and teachers. There are now 1979 full-time teachers, among which more than a half are postgraduates' tutors and doctoral supervisors. At present, SCNU has dozens of State Key Laboratory and engineering research centers.

The current president is Dr. Wang Enke.

== Academics ==
=== Schools and Departments ===
==== Shipai Campus ====
- School of Education
- School of Politics & Administration
- School of Marxism
- School of History & Culture
- School of Foreign Studies
- School of Special Education
- College of International Culture
- School of Fine Arts
- School of Tourism Management
- School of Information Technology in Education
- School of Mathematical Sciences
- School of Life Sciences
- School of Geography
- School of Computer
- School of Psychology
- College of Continuing Education
- School of Internet Education
- Phoenix International School
- Institute of Optoelectronic Materials and Technology
- College of Biophotonics
- School of Professional Development and Research on Primary and Secondary Education
- Institute for Brain Research and Rehabilitation
- South China Research Center for Applied Mathematics and Interdisciplinary Studies

==== HEMC Campus ====
- School of Literature
- School of Economics & Management
- School of Law
- School of Politics and Public Administration
- School of physical education & sports science
- School of Music
- School of Physics and Telecommunications Engineering
- School of Chemistry
- School of Tourism Management
- School of Information and Optoelectronic Science and Engineering
- South China Academy of Advanced Optoelectronics
- Institute of Quantum Matter
- Academy of Front-line Physics Science (物理前沿科学研究院)_{No official translation.}
- School of Environment
- Academy of Environment
- Department of Physics (物理学部)_{No official translation.}
- School of Entrepreneurship
- Institute for Science, Technology and Society
- South China Nuclear Science Computing Center (南方核科学计算中心)_{No official translation.}
- Academy of Future Technology (未来科技研究院)_{No official translation.}

==== Nanhai Campus ====
- Aberdeen Institute of Data Science and Artificial Intelligence, SCNU
- International Business College
- School of Artificial Intelligence
- School of Electronic Science and Engineering (School of Microelectronics)
- RSB Digital Business Institute

==== Shanwei Campus ====
- Xingzhi College
- School of Data Science and Engineering
- Department of General Education, Shanwei Campus
- School of Meterials and New Energy
- College of Vocational and Technical Education
- School of Basic Education
- School of Business
- School of Creative Design

=== Teaching and Auxiliary Departments ===
- Network Center
- Research Resources Center
- Journal of South China Normal University
- Archives of SCNU
- Libraries of SCNU
- Center of Teachers’ Learning and Development
- Center of Education and Development

=== Affiliated Departments ===
- South China Normal University Hospital
- The Affiliated Kindergarten of South China Normal University
- The Affiliated High School of SCNU
- The Affiliated Primary School of SCNU

=== South China university libraries ===
There are the multi-functional libraries on three campuses with more than 3.74 million books.

- Shipai campus:

Built in 1998, Shipai campus library has an area of 29 thousand square meters. It has around 1.83 million books and 1700 reading seats.

- HEMC campus:

Built up in 2004, HEMC campus library has an area of 39 thousand square meters. It has around 1.12 million books and 1800 reading seats.

- Nanhai campus:

Built up in 2002, Nanhai campus library has an area of 14 thousand square meters. It has around 0.61 million books and 1100 reading seats.

== Rankings and reputation ==
As of 2023, South China Normal University was ranked #400–500th by the Academic Ranking of World Universities.

In the 2026–2027 U.S. News Best Global Universities ranking, South China Normal University is ranked #514 worldwide.

== Student life ==
=== Student associations ===
South China University has more than 120 student associations covering five domains: theory and study, society and practice, academic and science technology, entertainment and sport, interest and hobby. To name a few: Student Association of English, Student Association of Psychology, Student Association of Huayun Han Chinese Clothing, Literature Association of Hai Pengzi, Martial Art Association, Guitar Association, etc.

=== Canteens ===
==== Shipai Campus ====
- Tao Yuan (陶园)
- Yong Yuan (雍园)
- Qin Yuan (沁园)

==== HEMC Campus ====
- Han Yuan (翰园)
- Nan Yuan (楠园)

==== Nanhai Campus ====
- Xi Yuan (熹园) (renamed to Xi Yuan in 2017)
