= Affiliated High School of South China Normal University =

Coordinates: 23°8′23.84″N 113°20′21.63″E

- 华南师范大学附属中学
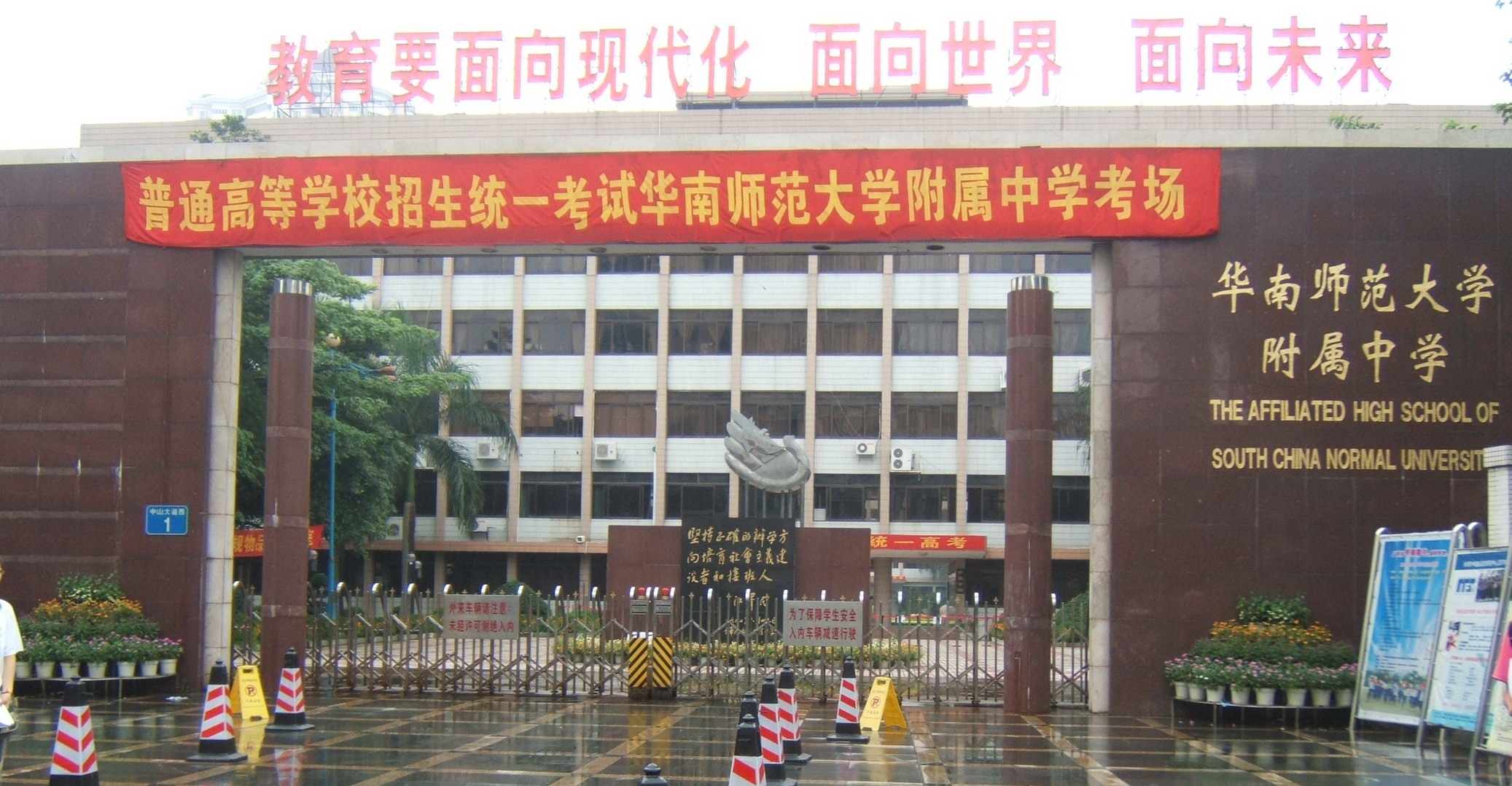

Location
- Main campus: 1 Zhongshan Avenue West, Tianhe District, Guangzhou; Panyu campus: In Huanan New Town, 168 Zhennan Avenue, Panyu District, Guangzhou; Nanhai campus: Dongping Er Road, Guicheng, Nanhai District, Foshan; New World campus: In Lingnan New World, Baiyun Avenue North, Baiyun District, Guangzhou; Shanwei campus: Shanhua Rd, Shanwei, Guangdong; Shanwei, Guangdong; China

Information
- Type: Main campus: Provincial Secondary Education; Other campusses: Private Secondary Education
- Motto: Diligent, Precise, Truth-seeking, and Creative
- Established: Merged in 1952; Trace back to 1888
- School district: Guangzhou, Guangdong, People's Republic of China
- Principal: Yao Xunqi
- Grades: Main campus: 3-years junior high (Guangdong Olympic School only); 3-years senior high
- Enrollment: 4 classes per grade in junior high, 12 classes per grade in senior high (from year 2018,9 per grade in junior)
- Nickname: HF
- Affiliation: South China Normal University
- Website: Main campus: http://www.hsfz.net.cn/

The Affiliated High School of South China Normal University, or Hua Shi Fu Zhong (HSFZ; simplified Chinese: 华南师范大学附属中学; traditional Chinese: 華南師范大學附屬中學; pinyin: Huánán shīfàn dàxué Fùshǔ Zhōngxué) is a high school in Guangzhou, Guangdong, People's Republic of China. It is a key provincial high school directly under the Department of Education of Guangdong Province and SCNU. The school is among the first schools designated as "the A-Class School" by the Provincial Education Bureau. In a 2016 ranking of Chinese high schools that send students to study in American universities, it ranked number 21 in mainland China in terms of the number of students entering top American universities.

If unspecified, HSFZ refers to its main campus in Gangding, Tianhe District, Guangzhou. It also has three other campuses, including two in Guangzhou, one in Foshan and one in Shanwei. The main campus is a provincial public school, while the other campuses are private schools.

== History ==
HSFZ is the result of a series of renames and mergers. The origin of HSFZ can be traced back to 1888, when Dr. Andrew Patton Happer established the Christian College in China in Shaji, Guangzhou. From 1888 to 1952, along the Qing dynasty, the Republic of China, and the People's Republic of China, the predecessors of HSFZ have renamed and merged a couple of times. See the chronicle below for details.

In 1952, with the Disciplinary Adjustment of Chinese Higher Education, four high schools merged to form the current HSFZ: the Affiliated High School of Sun Yat-Sen University, the Affiliated High School of Lingnan University, the Affiliated High School of South China Associated University, and the Affiliated High School of Guangdong College of Arts & Science. The school was named the Affiliated High School of South China Teacher's College. From 1960 to 1961, it was named the Affiliated High School of Guangdong College of Science. During the Cultural Revolution, it was named the No. 61 Middle School of Guangzhou. It changed to the current name in 1982.

However, some alumni argued that the establishing date of the school should be 1952 instead of 1888.

From the date of merging in 1952, HSFZ was located in Dongshan District, where it had been merged into Yuexiu District. In 1960, it relocated to the current campus in Tianhe District. The old campus had then developed into another high school, the Guangdong Experimental High School.

In 1993, HSFZ established Guangdong Olympic School, which is a "school inside the school" providing education to gifted students in mathematics, physics, chemistry, biography and information technology. The school has 4 classes per grade in junior high (grade 7–9) and 2 class per grade in senior high (grade 10–12). Students in the Olympic School has more chances to explore their interests in sciences.

== Faculty and staff ==
The former Vice Provincial Governor of Guangdong, educationalist, Wang Pingshan, headed the school as principal for more than twenty years. By 2004, the school staffed with more than 200 teachers, among which 81 Senior teachers, 17 Master teachers, and 4 with the title of The ACE Teacher of the Province. The management team comprises Principal Yao Xunqi, Deputy Principals Wu Qing and Xiao Zhaoyun.

== Academics ==
The motto of HSFZ is Diligent, Precise, Truth-seeking, and Creative. In most years, it is the best-performed school in the National Higher Education Entrance Examination in the province.

Over 98% of its graduates have been accepted by college or university.

=== Achievements ===
Over the past decade or so, more than 40 students from the school have been chosen for national training courses of International Olympiads. By September 2008, HSFZ students had won eight gold medals, three silver and two bronze medals in International Mathematical Olympiad, 1 gold medal in International Physics Olympiad, two gold and one silver medals in International Chemistry Olympiad, one gold medal in International Astronomy Olympiad, two medals in International Geography Olympiad (the only two medals that Chinese students ever won), 1 gold medal in International Energy Project Olympiad, one gold medal in Asian Physics Olympiad, and four gold and seven silver medals in Russian Mathematical Olympiad. It won the most number of medals in International Olympiads among all high schools in China.

In the 1950s and 1960s, HSFZ was honored as "a pioneering flag" in the field of regular education in Guangdong. It has received "School of National Distinction" awards in the following categories: its "animated campus life"; its success in comprehensive implementation of the "Regulation on Physical Education in Schools" and "Regulation on Health Care in Schools"; achievements in turning out talented sporting candidates.

In addition, the school has achieved "Excellency in Performance" status and "Premium Education Level" status in Guangdong schools.

=== Admissions ===
The school's admissions are competitive, with the enrollment cutoff being the highest among all high schools in the city in most years. For example, in 2009, its cutoff was 744. Generally, only residents of Guangzhou are allowed to enroll to HSFZ. However, its Creative Class and affiliated Guangdong Olympic School admits students from all over the province.

Guangdong Olympic School holds a different entrance examination from the Senior High School Entrance Examination. Its admissions are more competitive. For example, only 50 students passed the written part and entered the interview in 2011, which made up 7% of all students who applied.

== Alumni ==
The school has turned out four fellows of the Chinese Academy of Sciences and three fellows of the Chinese Academy of Engineering.
