= Guangzhou Medical University =

Municipal public university in Guangzhou, Guangdong, China

- 广州医科大学 (Chinese)
- Motto: 诚信务实，自强不息，敢为人先，追求卓越
- Motto in English: Integrity and pragmatism, self-improvement, dare to be the first, pursuit of excellence
- Type: Public
- Established: 1958; 68 years ago
- Affiliations: ASRMU; Guangdong-Hong Kong-Macao University Alliance (GHMUA)
- Chancellor: Zhao Xingcun
- Undergraduates: 10,000
- Postgraduates: 1,300
- Location: Guangzhou, Guangdong, China; 46.7865°N 130.3635°E
- Campus: 4 campuses - Dongfeng Road West, Longdong, Haizhu and Jianggao
- Website: www.gzhmu.edu.cn

Chinese name
- Simplified Chinese: 广州医科大学
- Traditional Chinese: 廣州醫科大學
Transcriptions
Standard Mandarin
- Hanyu Pinyin: Guǎngzhōu Yīkē Dàxué

Guangzhou Medical University (GZHMU; 广州医科大学) is a municipal public medical university in Guangzhou, Guangdong, China. It is affiliated with the City of Guangzhou and funded by the municipal government. The university is part of the Double First-Class Construction.

The university was formerly known as Guangzhou Medical College.

== History ==
It was established in 1958. The international student internship program began in 2013.

"Nan Yue Outstanding Graduate Student" campaign started in 1993 in Guangdong province.

== Motto ==
GMU's motto, chosen from Chinese is 诚信务实，自强不息，敢为人先，追求卓越. The motto is literally translated as "pragmatic integrity, self-discipline, always to be the first and pursuit of excellence", and has been in use since the 1950s.

== Academics ==
=== Students ===
Approximately 1,500 undergraduates and 550 postgraduates (master and doctors) enroll from mainland China, Hong Kong and Macau each year. 23,300 students study full-time, including 10,000 undergraduates, 1,300 graduate students, and 12,000 continuing education students. International students: 218 full-time undergraduates are studying MBBS in English medium, mostly from India and Nepal. Rest are from Tanzania, Bangladesh, Pakistan, Australia, France, Ghana, Cameroon, Comoros, United States, South Africa, Saint Vincent, Sudan, Uganda, Singapore, United Kingdom, Zambia, Sierra Leone, Equatorial Guinea, Mozambique, and 21 other countries.

=== Campus ===
Guangzhou Medical University has two campuses, Panyu and Yuexiu, covering an area of 372,300 square meters and a construction area of 481,900 square meters. There are 22 colleges, seven directly affiliated hospitals and 11 non-directly affiliated hospitals, and 28 research institutions.

Guangzhou Medical University has 20 research institutes:

- Guangzhou Institute of Respiratory Diseases
- The Sino-French Hoffmann Institute
- Guangzhou Institute of Snake Venom
- Institute of Neuroscience
- Institute for Chemical Carcinogenesis
- Cancer Research Institute
- Institute of Humanities and Social Sciences
- Institute of Integrated Chinese and Western Medicine
- Guangzhou Institute of Obstetrics and Gynecology
- Guangzhou Institute of Cardiovascular Disease
- Guangzhou Institute of Orthopedics
- Urology Institute and Institute of Higher Education

=== Academic programs ===
Specialties include clinical medicine, medical examination, medical imaging, nursing, anesthesiology, stomatology, preventive medicine, pharmacy, therapeutic recreation, public service administration (PSA), biomedical engineering, psychotechnics, biotechnology, Chinese and Western integrative medicine, law, statistics, information management and systems, marketing management and food quality inspection.

=== International Student Internship ===
Physician internships run 48 weeks. Students apply for posts in the 8 affiliated hospitals of Guangzhou Medical University. Before the internship, students must pass to HSK 3 (Han Yu Shui Ping Kao Shi).

=== MBBS degree ===
The university offers Bachelor of Medicine and Bachelor of Surgery degrees. Undergraduates who meet degree requirements receive a graduation certificate and a medical degree. Graduates can apply to take the medical licensing examination in order to practice medicine. Some countries may require students to complete academic accreditation first.

=== Rankings and reputation ===
University rankings

Global – Overall
- ARWU World: 401-500 (2023)
- THE World: 601-800 (2023)
- USNWR Global: 1129 (2022)

Regional – Overall
- USNWR Asia: 320 (2022)

National – Overall
- USNWR National: 126 (2022)

==== Academic Ranking of World Universities (ARWU) ====
Academic Ranking of World Universities (ARWU), also known as the Shanghai Ranking, is one of the annual publications of world university rankings. It's the first global university ranking with multifarious indicators.

Year	Rank	Valuer
2023	13	ARWU Best Chinese Universities Ranking - Ranking of Chinese Medical Universities

==== Nature Index ====
Nature Index tracks the affiliations of high-quality scientific articles and presents research outputs by institution and country on monthly basis.

Year	Rank	Valuer
2022	118	Nature Index - Academic Institutions - China
2023	456	Nature Index - Academic Institutions - Global
2023	119	Nature Index - Academic Institutions - China

==== Times Higher Education (THE) ====
Year	Rank	Valuer
2023	601-800	Times Higher Education World University Rankings
2023	9	Times Higher Education Top Universities With Best Student-To-Staff Ratio

==== U.S. News & World Report Best Global Universities Ranking ====
Year	Rank	Valuer
2022	1129	U.S. News Best Global Universities Ranking

==== CUAA (Chinese Universities Alumni Association) ====
Universities Ranking of China released by CUAA (Chinese Universities Alumni Association, Chinese: 中国校友会网) is one of the most foremost domestic university rankings in China.

Year	Rank	Valuer
2022	144	CUAA China University Ranking
