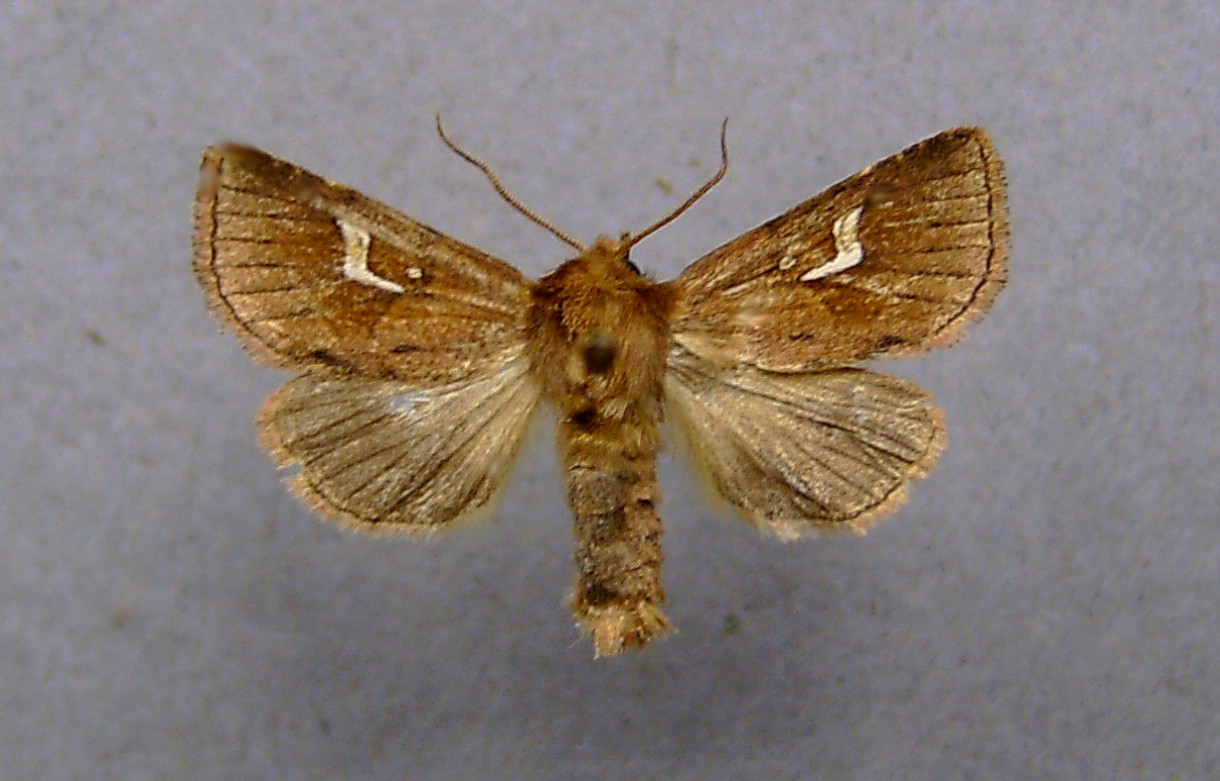

Scientific classification
- Domain: Eukaryota
- Kingdom: Animalia
- Phylum: Arthropoda
- Class: Insecta
- Order: Lepidoptera
- Superfamily: Noctuoidea
- Family: Noctuidae
- Genus: Phragmatiphila
- Species: P. nexa

Binomial name
- Phragmatiphila nexa (Hübner, 1808)

Synonyms
- Noctua nexa; Nonagria nexa; Nonagria insularis; Phragmatophila insularis

= Phragmatiphila nexa =

Species of moth

Phragmatiphila nexa is a moth of the family Noctuidae. It is found locally in Central Europe, north to Denmark, southern Sweden, and southern Finland. Westward, it is found up to north and central France, south to Switzerland, northern Italy, Austria and southern Hungary. Eastward, it is found to Poland, the Baltic states, and the European part of the former Soviet Union up to western Siberia. Furthermore, there are isolated populations in central Italy, in Sardinia, and in Corsica.

The wingspan is 18–30 mm. Adults are on wing from August to September in one generation.

The larvae feed on various plants, including Carex acutiformis, Glyceria maxima and Phragmites australis.
