= Alisma orientale =

Scientific classification
- Kingdom: Plantae
- Clade: Tracheophytes
- Clade: Angiosperms
- Clade: Monocots
- Order: Alismatales
- Family: Alismataceae
- Genus: Alisma
- Species: A. orientale

Binomial name
- Alisma orientale (Sam.) Juz. 1933

Synonyms
- Alisma plantago-aquatica subsp. orientale (Sam.) Sam.

Species of plant

Alisma orientale, commonly known as Asian water plantain is a flowering plant species in the genus Alisma found in Asia.

Alisma orientale is sometimes treated as a variety of Alisma plantago-aquatica (Alisma plantago-aquatica var. orientale). The rhizomes of A. orientale have been used as a traditional Chinese medicine, ze xie. However, it may have serious side effects or even toxic effects such as hepatotoxicity. The rhizome of the plant is also a herb used in kampo Japanese medicine.

The seed contains cis-aconitic anhydride ethyl ester and cis-2,4,5-trihydroxycinnamic acid.
