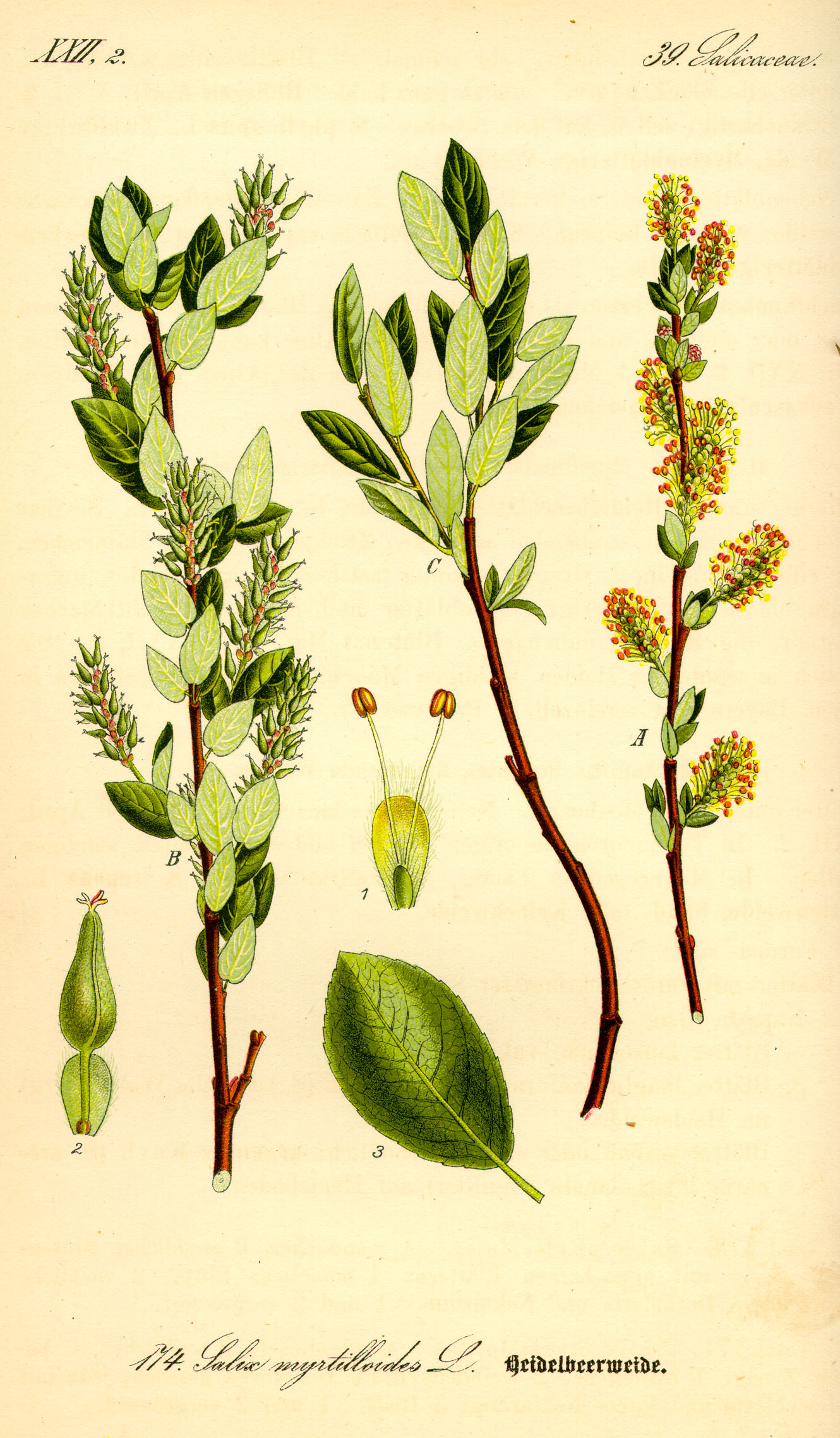

Scientific classification
- Kingdom: Plantae
- Clade: Tracheophytes
- Clade: Angiosperms
- Clade: Eudicots
- Clade: Rosids
- Order: Malpighiales
- Family: Salicaceae
- Genus: Salix
- Species: S. breviserrata

Binomial name
- Salix breviserrata B. Flod., 1940

Synonyms
- Salix breviserrata subsp. fontqueri T. E. Díaz González, J. A. Fernández Prieto & H. Nava; Salix myrsinites var. breviserrata (B. Flod.) E. Murray

= Salix breviserrata =

Shrub in the genus of willows

Salix breviserrata is a species of willow belonging to the family Salicaceae. It is found in southern Europe in the Alps, and in the Iberian Peninsula in the Cantabrian Mountains, especially in the Picos de Europa, Somiedo, and the Sierra and Valle del Híjar (Campoo Valley).

== Taxonomy ==
The species was described by Björn Floderus and published in Arkiv för Botanik 29A (18):. 41, in obs, 44, in 1940.

== Description ==
It is a shrub that reaches a size of 0.1-0.2 (0.4) m in height, ± creeping. The gnarled branches, glabrescent at first, then glabrous, reddish-brown or grayish-brown. The leaves are 2 (5) × 1–2 cm, lanceolate to elliptical or transovate-lanceolate, acute or more rarely obtuse at the apex, rounded or shortly attenuated at the base, with the margin toothed-serrated, glandular, upper side and underside normally glabrous, sometimes hairy, green and shiny, without glaucescence on the underside, with 3-5 pairs of secondary nerves, prominent on both sides; petiole short, less than 0.5 cm; stipules ovate-lanceolate, equal-sided, sharply serrated, sometimes absent. Catkinsup to 3 × 1 cm, contemporaneous, sometimes late, terminal or subterminal, on long peduncles, with foliaceous bracts and hairy rachis; floral bracts transovate, with the apex obtuse, dark, pubescent. Flowers with a violet nectarium; the masculine ones with 2 stamens, with free filaments, glabrous, and purple or black anthers, then violaceous; the female ones with a subsessile or sessile pistil, tomentose, glabrescent at maturity, purple or red-violet, long, purple in style, and purple bifid stigmas.
