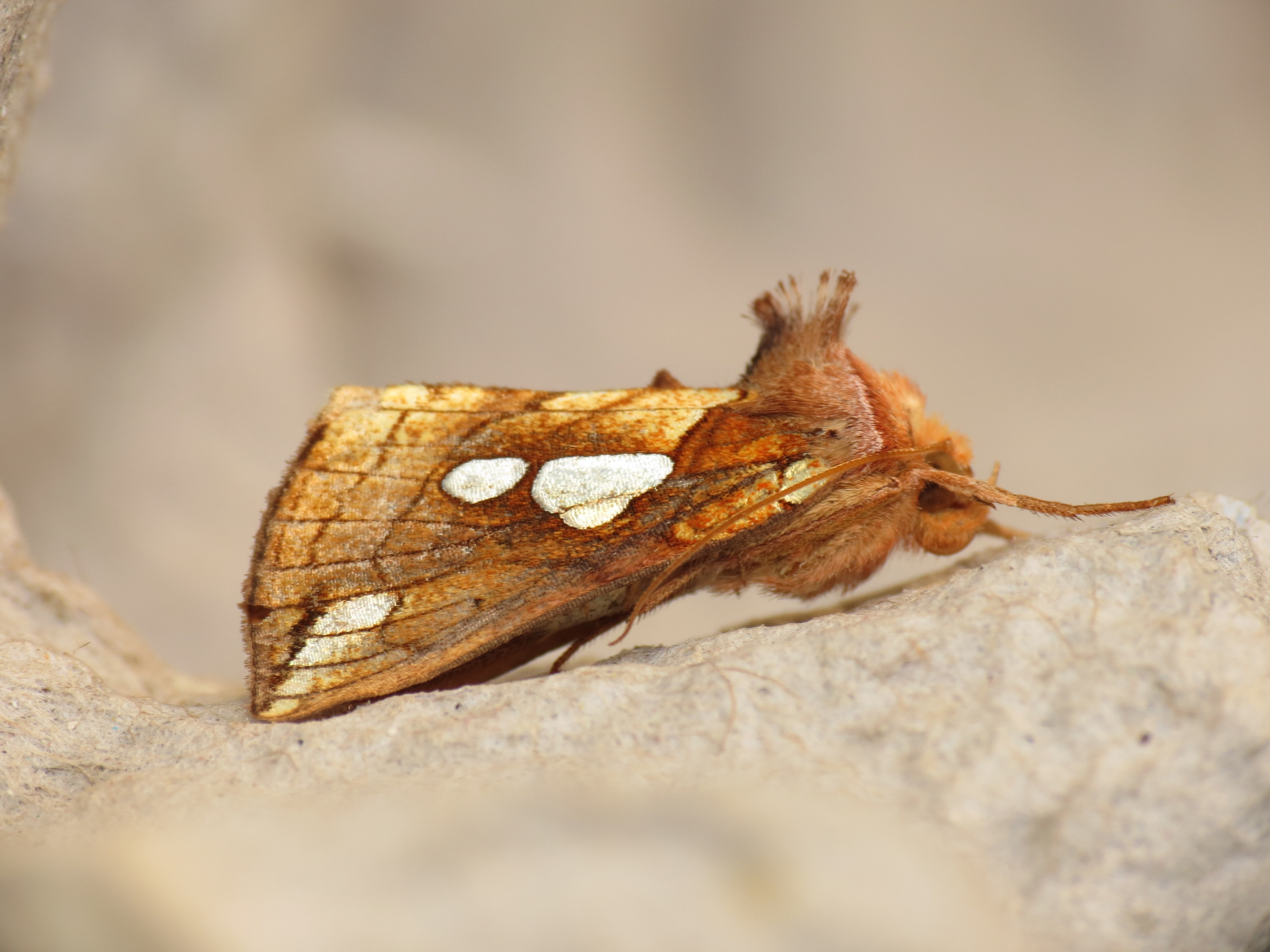

Scientific classification
- Domain: Eukaryota
- Kingdom: Animalia
- Phylum: Arthropoda
- Class: Insecta
- Order: Lepidoptera
- Superfamily: Noctuoidea
- Family: Noctuidae
- Genus: Plusia
- Species: P. putnami

Binomial name
- Plusia putnami Grote, 1873

Synonyms
- Phytometra barbara Warren, 1913; Plusia festata Graeser, (1890); Chrysaspidia major Chou & Lu, 1979; Chrysaspidia conjuncta Chou & Lu, 1978; Autographa gracilis Lempke, 1966

= Plusia putnami =

Species of moth

Plusia putnami, the Lempke's gold spot or Putnam's looper moth, is a species of moth of the family Noctuidae. It is found in the Palearctic realm, from Japan and eastern Siberia to Fennoscandia, Great Britain, and France. In North America, it ranges from Newfoundland and Labrador to central Alaska and the interior of British Columbia, south to Pennsylvania, Washington, north-eastern California, and in the Rocky Mountains to Utah and Colorado.

The wing pattern differences between putnami and Plusia festucae are not constant. Genitalic genital dissection is needed to differentiate these two species. The wingspan is 32–42 mm.

== Biology ==
Adults are on wing from July to August in western Europe and from May to October in the northern parts of North America.

Food plants of the larvae include Calamagrostis.

== Subspecies ==
- Plusia putnami putnami (Newfoundland, Labrador to Pennsylvania, southern Canada to Alaska, Washington to northern California, Rocky Mountains)
- Plusia putnami barbara (Morocco)
- Plusia putnami festata (Far East, Altai mountains, Japan)
- Plusia putnami gracilis (Europe, western Siberia)
