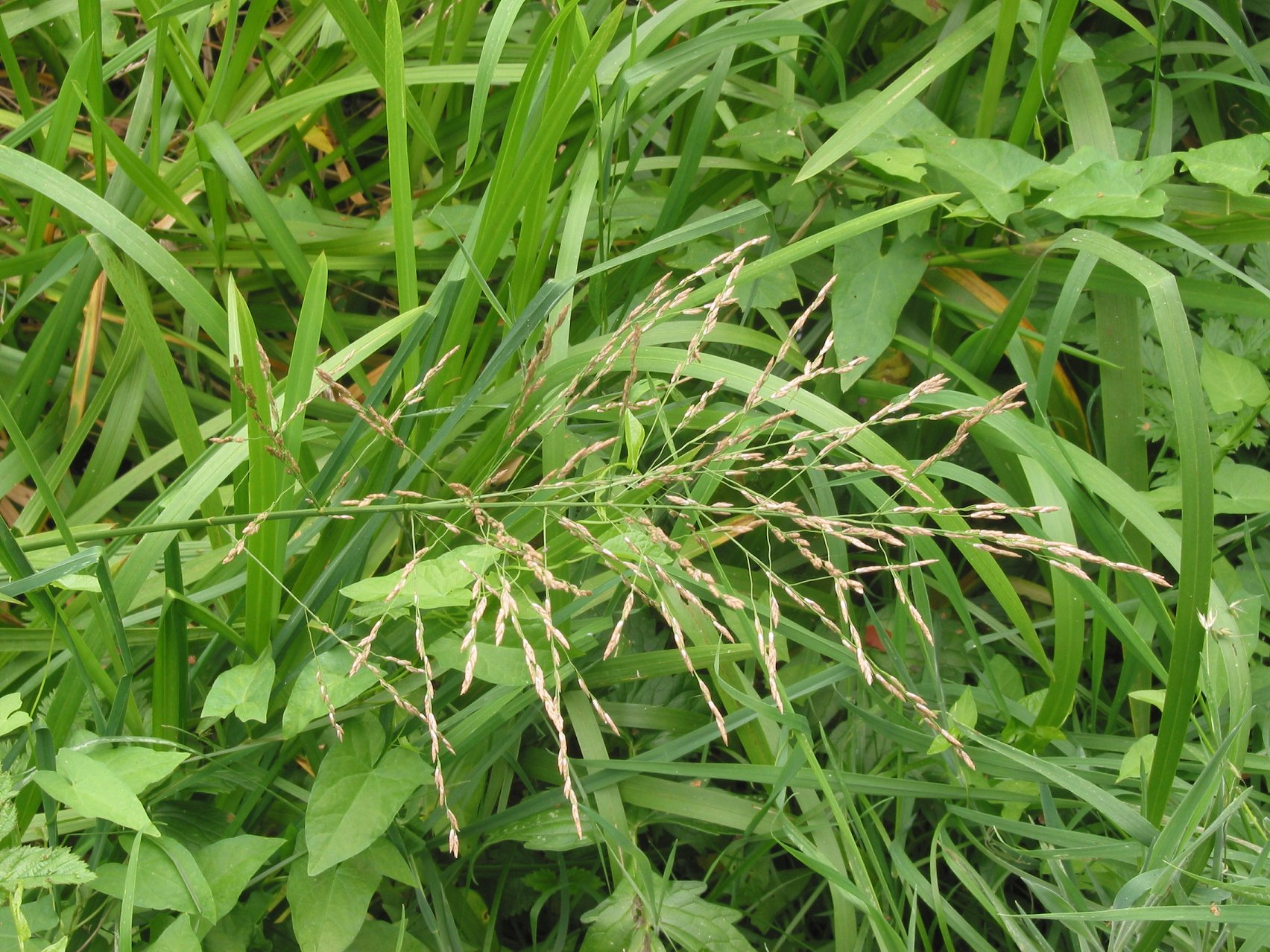

Scientific classification
- Kingdom: Plantae
- Clade: Tracheophytes
- Clade: Angiosperms
- Clade: Monocots
- Clade: Commelinids
- Order: Poales
- Family: Poaceae
- Subfamily: Pooideae
- Genus: Glyceria
- Species: G. maxima

Binomial name
- Glyceria maxima (Hartm.) Holmb.

= Glyceria maxima =

Species of grass

Glyceria maxima (syn. G. aquatica (L.) Wahlenb.; G. spectabilis Mert. & W.D.J. Koch; Molinia maxima Hartm.; Poa aquatica L.), imfe Nd commonly known as great manna grass, reed mannagrass, reed sweet-grass, and greater sweet-grass is a species of rhizomatous perennial grasses in the mannagrass genus native to Europe and Western Siberia and growing in wet areas such as riverbanks and ponds. It is highly competitive and invasive and is often considered to be a noxious weed outside its native range.
