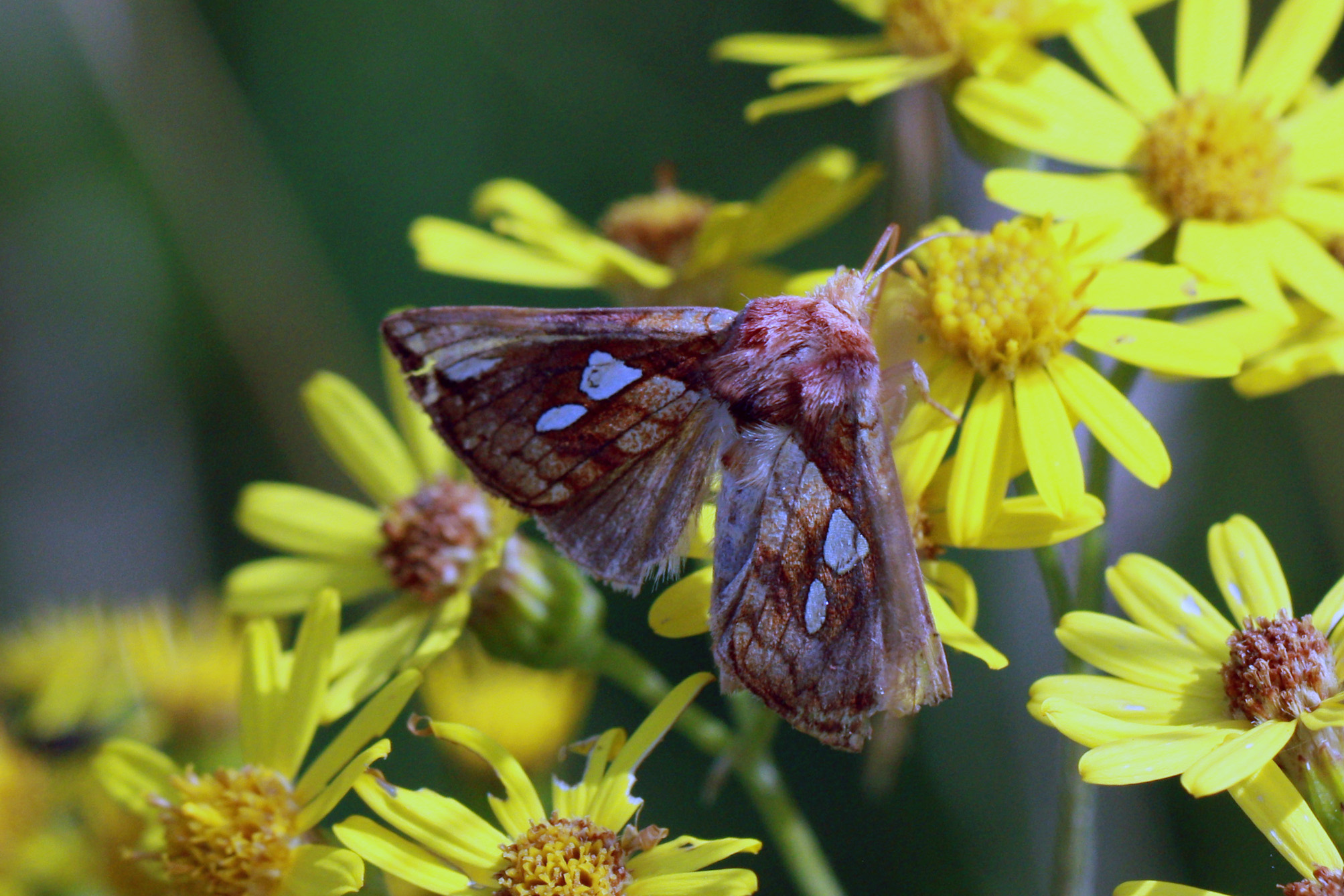

Scientific classification
- Kingdom: Animalia
- Phylum: Arthropoda
- Class: Insecta
- Order: Lepidoptera
- Superfamily: Noctuoidea
- Family: Noctuidae
- Genus: Plusia
- Species: P. festucae

Binomial name
- Plusia festucae (Linnaeus, 1758)

= Plusia festucae =

Gold spot

Species of moth

Plusia festucae (gold spot) is a species of moth of the family Noctuidae. It is found throughout the Palearctic realm from Ireland to Japan.

== Technical description and variation ==
The wingspan is 34–46 mm. Forewing deep golden brown, with a golden metallic sheen at base of costa, on inner margin of median area, and on an oblique patch before apex; lines all oblique, dark brown; veins dark brown; at base of vein 2 a large silvery rounded blotch, with a smaller, more elongate, one beyond it; the lowest streak of the apical blotch, below vein 6, and a spot at base of costa are also silvery; hindwing bronzy fuscous, with pinkish fringe.

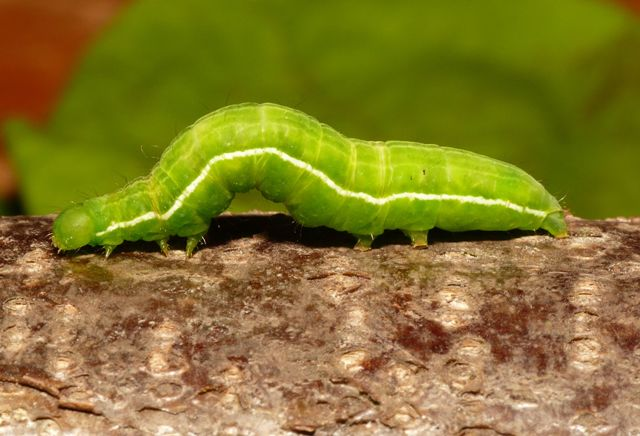
Larva

== Biology ==
The moth flies from June to September depending on the location.

Larva green; dorsal line dark green, edged with white; subdorsal and lateral lines white; spiracular yellowish; head green. The larvae feed on Carex, Sparganium erectum, Iris pseudacorus and Alisma. Pupates in a whitish cocoon on the underside of a blade of grass, doubled over for the purpose.
