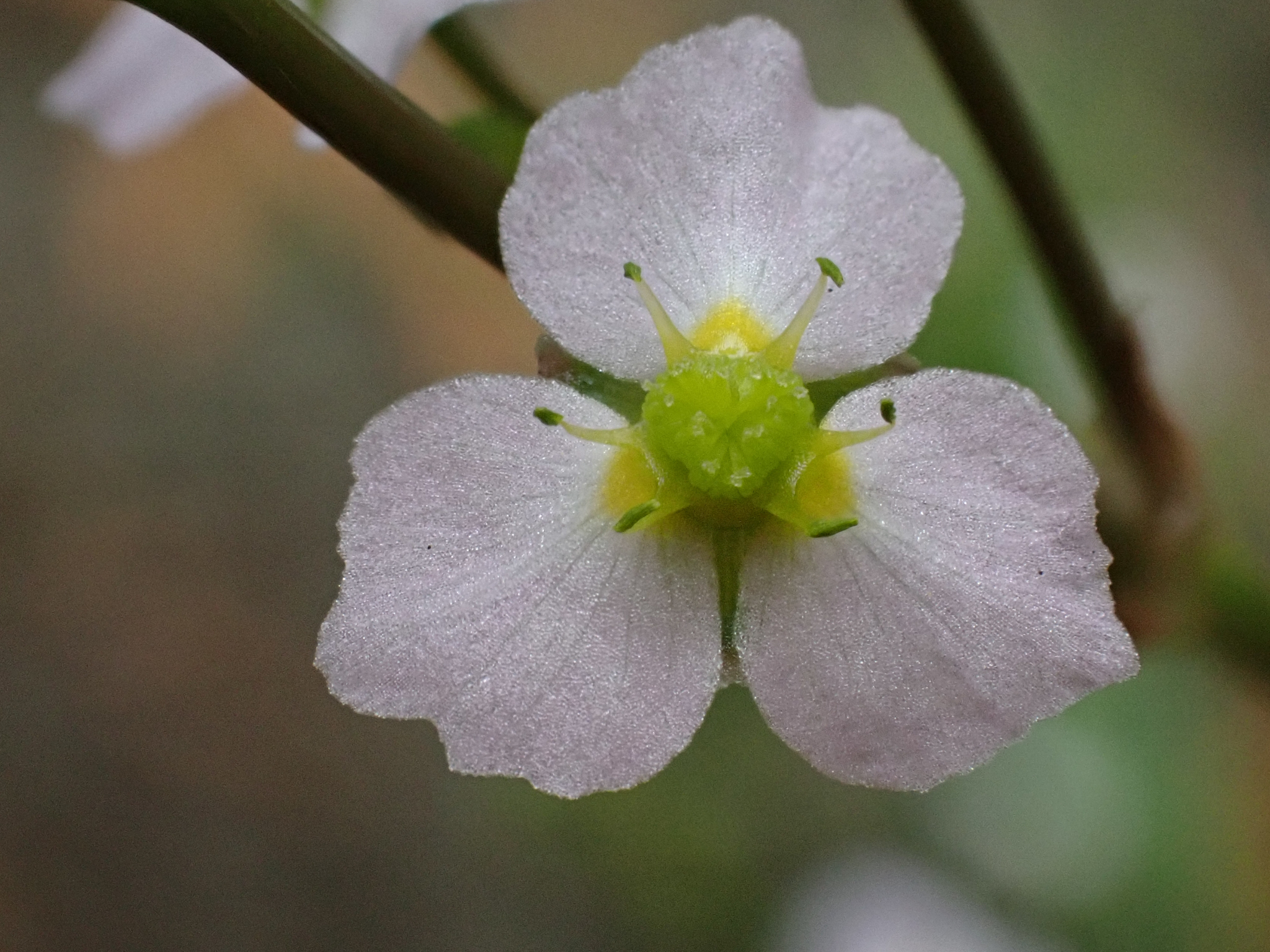

Conservation status
- Least Concern (IUCN 3.1)

- Apparently Secure (NatureServe)

Scientific classification
- Kingdom: Plantae
- Clade: Tracheophytes
- Clade: Angiosperms
- Clade: Monocots
- Order: Alismatales
- Family: Alismataceae
- Genus: Alisma
- Species: A. lanceolatum

Binomial name
- Alisma lanceolatum With.

= Alisma lanceolatum =

Species of plant

Alisma lanceolatum is a species of aquatic plant in the water plantain family known by the common names lanceleaf water plantain and narrow-leaved water plantain. It is widespread across Europe, North Africa and temperate Asia. It is naturalized in Australia, New Zealand, Oregon, California and British Columbia. It is considered a noxious weed in some places.

This species is a weed of rice fields in many areas, including New South Wales and California.

In England and Wales it is occasionally locally found, in Ireland it is rare, and Scotland it is very rare.

It is found in mud and in fresh waters.

== Description ==
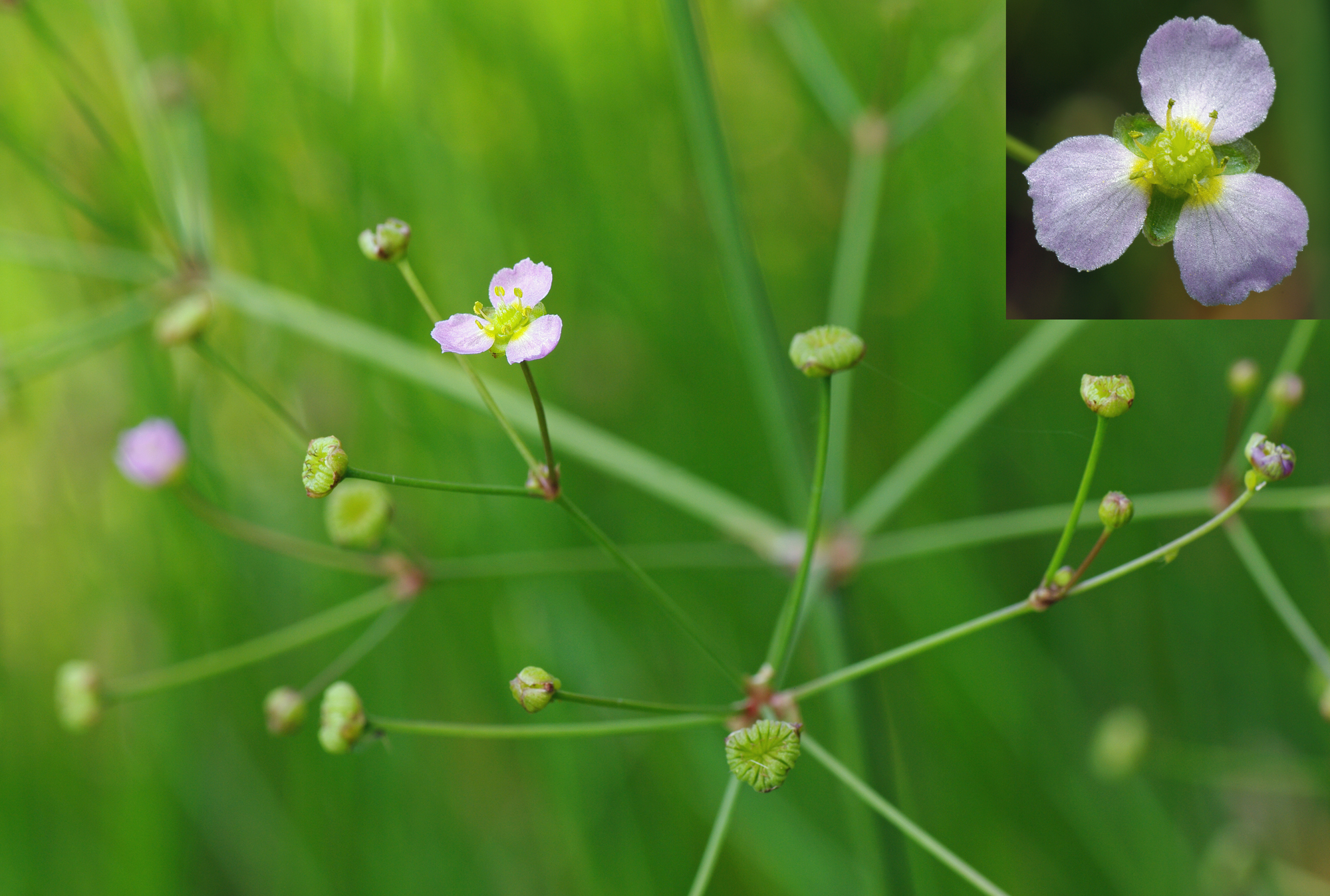
Part of an inflorescence and single blossom

This is a perennial herb growing from a caudex in the water or mud that typically reaches a height of about 0.7 meters and a spread of 0.25 meters. It produces lance-shaped leaves 12 to 20 centimeters long and 4 wide on long petioles; leaves which remain submerged in water are smaller and less prominently veined. The inflorescence is mostly erect and up to half a meter tall.

It produces a wide array of small pinkish-purple three-petalled flowers that open in the morning, from June until August. The fruit is a tiny achene up to 2 or 3 millimeters long clustered into an aggregate fruit of about 20 units. The seeds are reddish-brown and about 1.5 millimeters long.

== Cultivation ==
Grows best in water 15-30 centimeters deep in full sun. Suitable for USDA hardiness zones 5–8.

== Similar Species ==
The water plantain Alisma plantago-aquatica has acute leaf tips not tapering to a stalk. The flowers of A. plantago-aquatica also typically open in the afternoon, and the leaves are wider.
