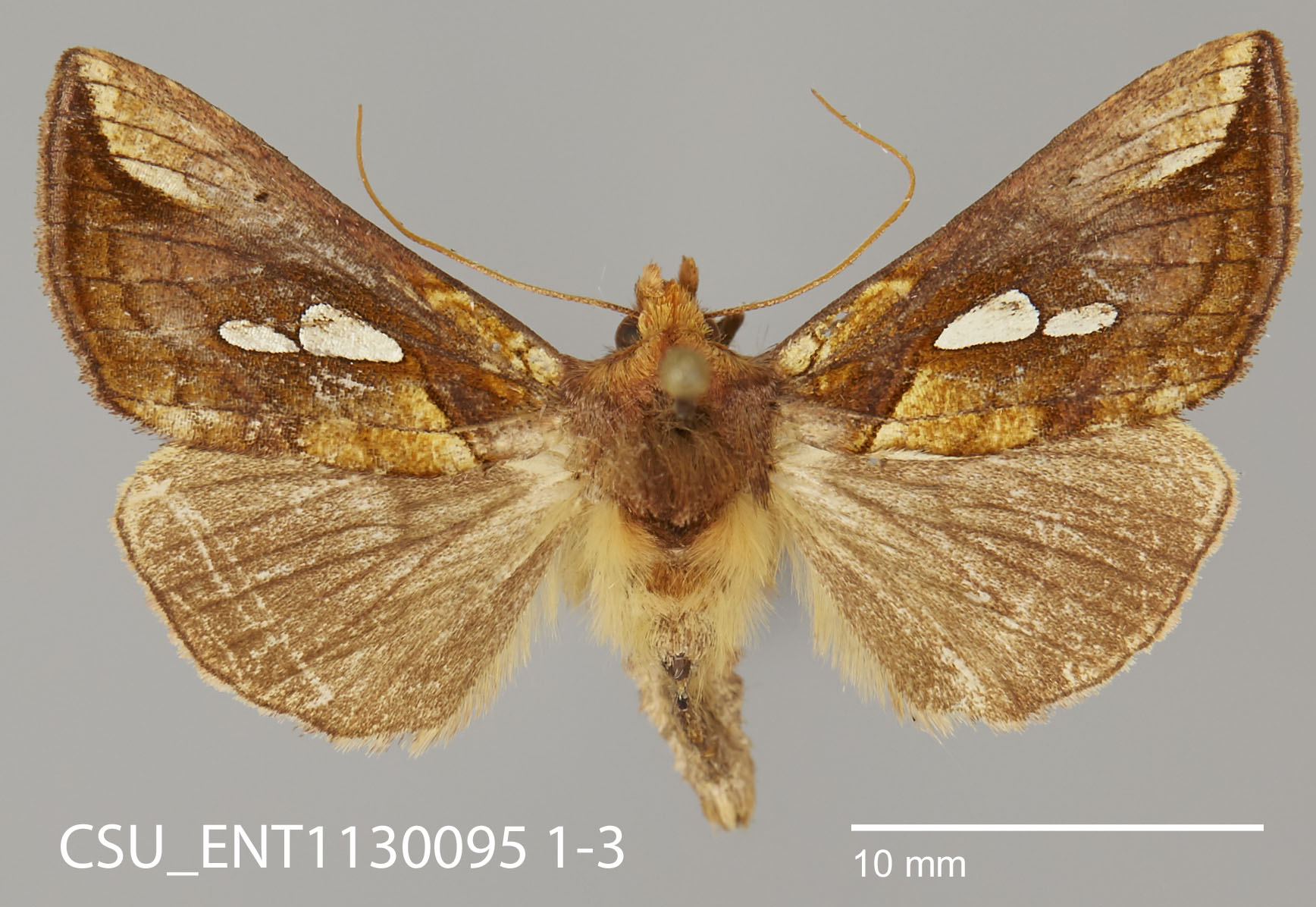

Scientific classification
- Kingdom: Animalia
- Phylum: Arthropoda
- Class: Insecta
- Order: Lepidoptera
- Superfamily: Noctuoidea
- Family: Noctuidae
- Genus: Plusia
- Species: P. nichollae

Binomial name
- Plusia nichollae (Hampson, 1913)

= Plusia nichollae =

Species of moth

Plusia nichollae is a species of looper moth in the family Noctuidae. It is found in North America.

The MONA or Hodges number for Plusia nichollae is 8951.
