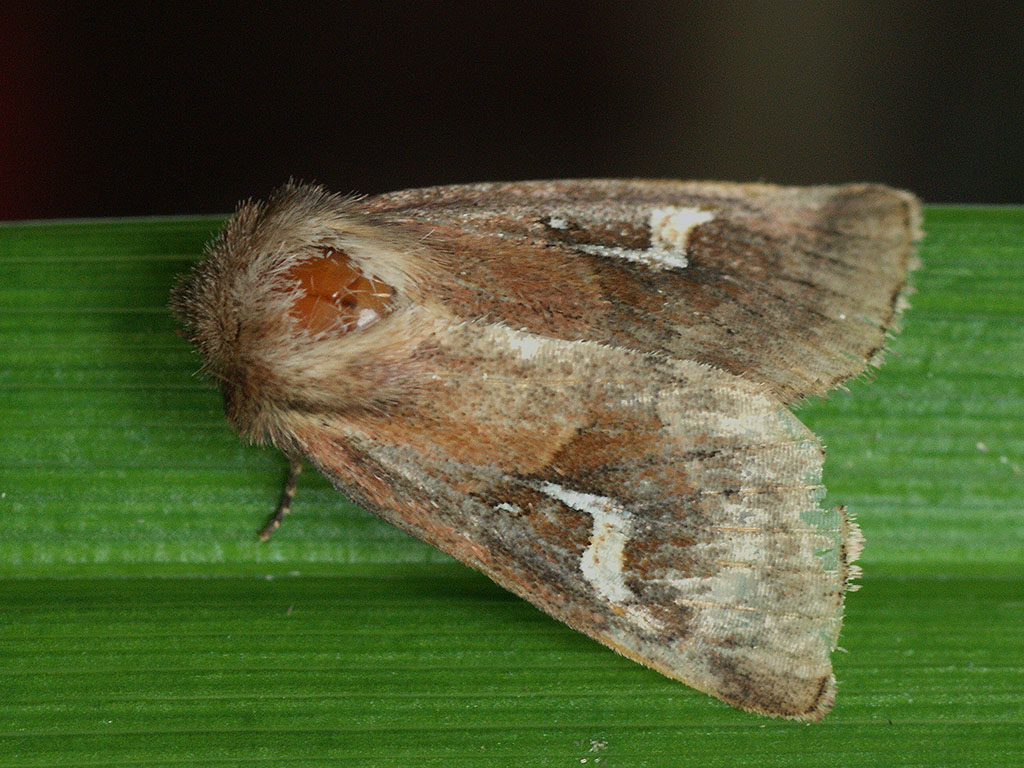
- Phragmatiphila nexa from Russia

Scientific classification
- Kingdom: Animalia
- Phylum: Arthropoda
- Clade: Pancrustacea
- Class: Insecta
- Order: Lepidoptera
- Superfamily: Noctuoidea
- Family: Noctuidae
- Genus: Phragmatiphila; Hampson, 1908

= Phragmatiphila =

Genus of moths

Phragmatiphila is a genus of moths of the family Noctuidae.

== Species ==
- Phragmatiphila agrapta Wileman & West, 1929
- Phragmatiphila connexa Bethune-Baker, 1911
- Phragmatiphila hemicelaena Wileman & West, 1929
- Phragmatiphila nexa (Hübner, [1808])
