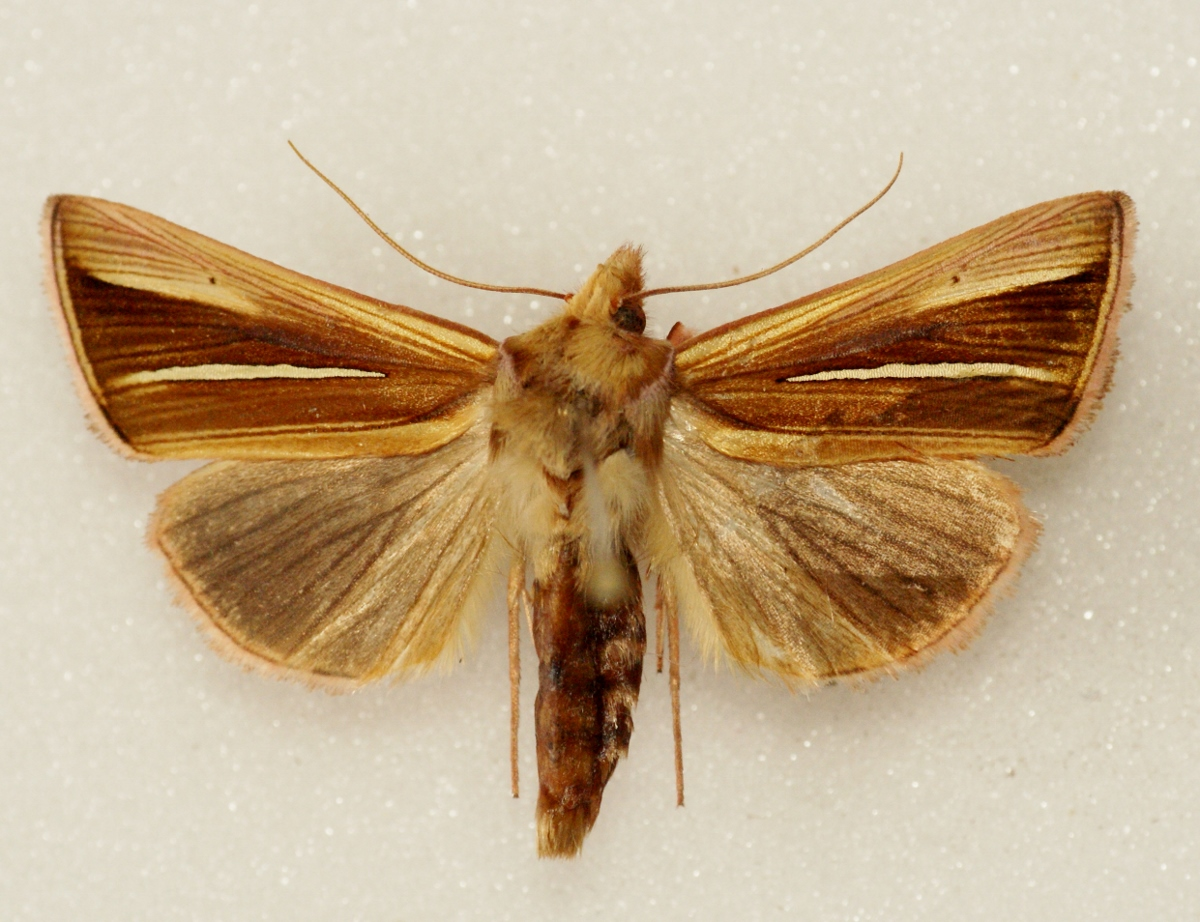

Scientific classification
- Kingdom: Animalia
- Phylum: Arthropoda
- Class: Insecta
- Order: Lepidoptera
- Superfamily: Noctuoidea
- Family: Noctuidae
- Genus: Plusia
- Species: P. venusta

Binomial name
- Plusia venusta Walker, 1865

= Plusia venusta =

Species of moth

Plusia venusta, the white-streaked looper, is a species of looper moth in the family Noctuidae. It is found in North America.

The MONA or Hodges number for Plusia venusta is 8953.
