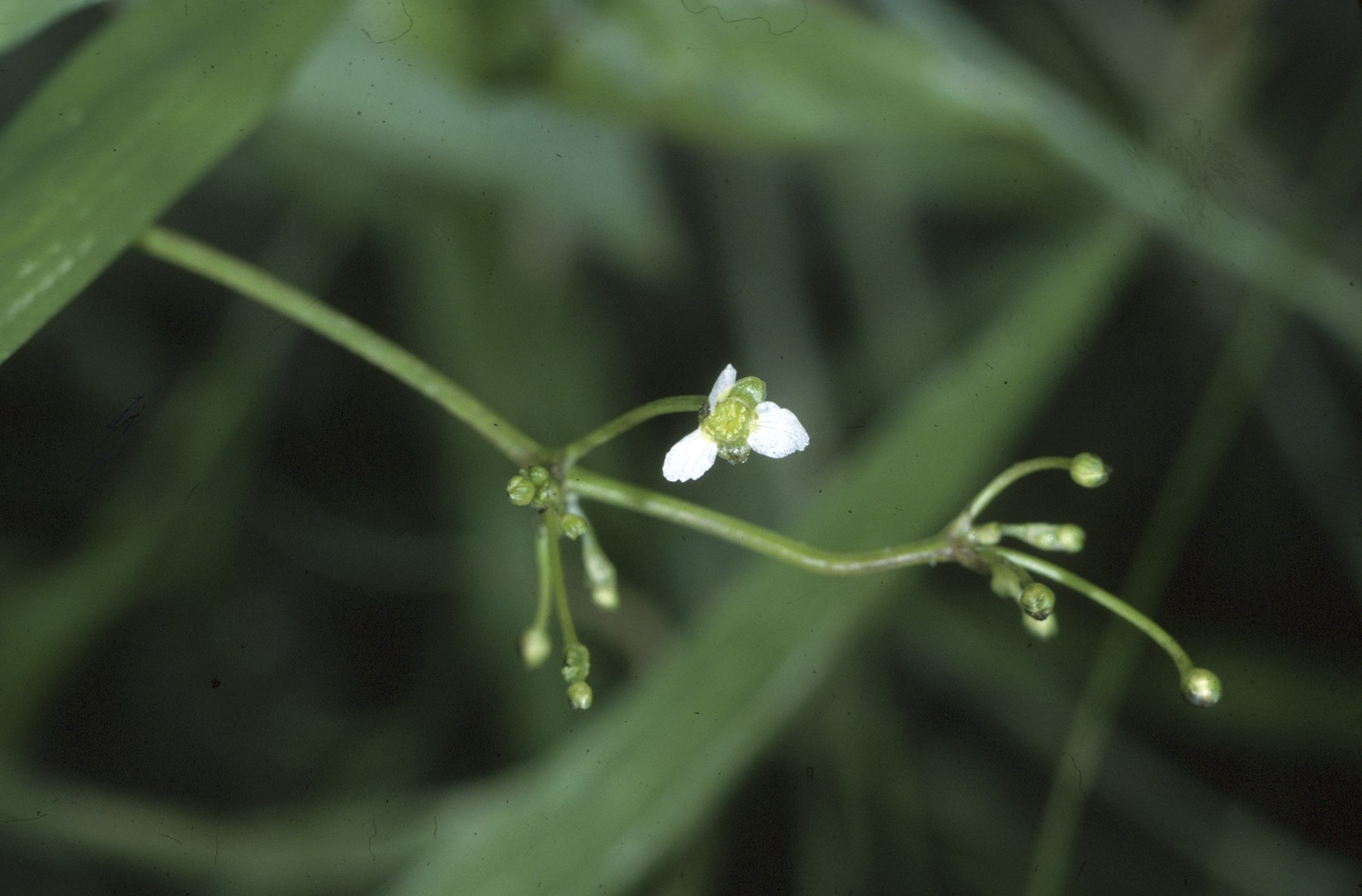

Conservation status
- Least Concern (IUCN 3.1)

Scientific classification
- Kingdom: Plantae
- Clade: Tracheophytes
- Clade: Angiosperms
- Clade: Monocots
- Order: Alismatales
- Family: Alismataceae
- Genus: Alisma
- Species: A. subcordatum

Binomial name
- Alisma subcordatum Raf.

Synonyms
- Alisma plantago-aquatica L. ssp. subcordatum (Raf.) Hultén; Alisma plantago-aquatica L. var. parviflorum (Pursh) Torr.; Alisma parviflorum Pursh

= Alisma subcordatum =

American water plantain

Species of aquatic plant

Alisma subcordatum, the American water plantain, is a perennial aquatic plant in the water-plantain family (Alismataceae). This plant grows to about 3 feet (0.91 meters) in height with lance to oval shaped leaves rising from bulbous corms with fibrous roots. Any leaves that form underwater are weak and quick to rot; they rarely remain on adult plants. A branched inflorescence with white to pink 3-petaled flowers blooms from June to September. The seeds are eaten by waterfowl and upland birds. Native Americans dried and ate the submerged rootlike structures. The species name subcordatum means "almost heart-shaped".

== Distribution and habitat ==
American water plantain is native to most of eastern and central United States and Canada from Texas to Georgia, north to Manitoba and New Brunswick, though it has not been reported from Florida. It grows in the mud of still to slow moving water, seeps, and wetlands.
