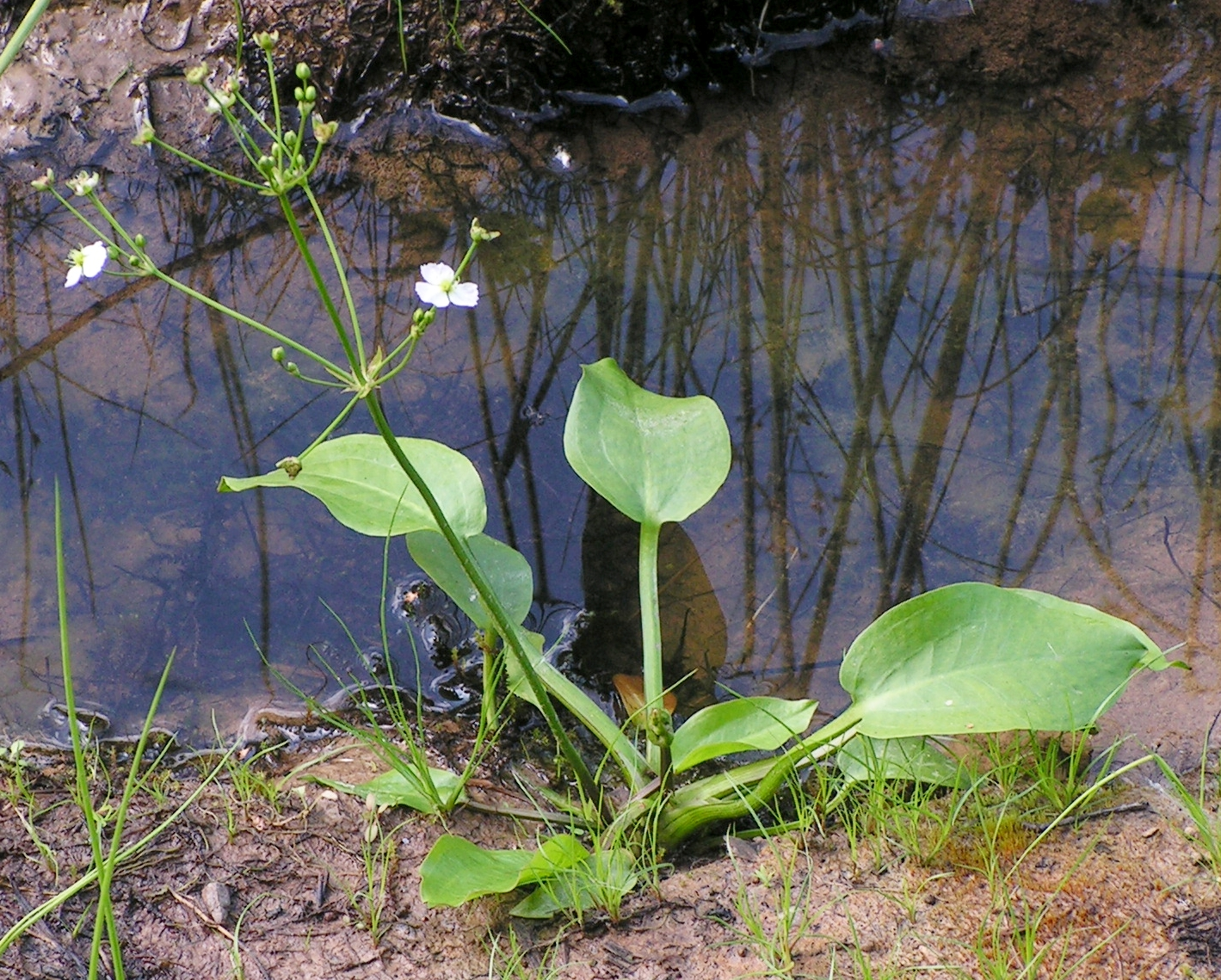
- Alisma plantago-aquatica

Scientific classification
- Kingdom: Plantae
- Clade: Embryophytes
- Clade: Tracheophytes
- Clade: Spermatophytes
- Clade: Angiosperms
- Clade: Monocots
- Order: Alismatales
- Family: Alismataceae
- Genus: Alisma; L.

Species
- See text

= Alisma =

Genus of aquatic plants

Alisma is a genus of flowering plants in the family Alismataceae, members of which are commonly known as water-plantains. The genus consists of aquatic plants with leaves either floating or submerged, found in a variety of still water habitats around the world (nearly worldwide). The flowers are hermaphrodite, and are arranged in panicles, racemes, or umbels. Alisma flowers have six stamens, numerous free carpels in a single whorl, each with 1 ovule, and subventral styles. The fruit is an achene with a short beak.

The nineteenth century British art and social critic John Ruskin believed that the particular curve of the leaf-ribs of Alisma represented a model of 'divine proportion' and helped shape his theory of Gothic architecture.

Copóg Phádraig ("Patrick's leaf") is the Irish name for the water-plantain. It is reputed to ward off fairies.

Water plantains are perennial plants. These herbs are usually emergent plants 0.1–1 m (4–40 in) high. They have broad leaves that can be either tapered or rounded at the base. When submerged, the plant produces ribbon-like leaves. Inflorescences are highly branched. They produce whorls of perfect flowers either white or pinkish. The fruits are flat-sided nutlets 2.5–3 mm (0.098–0.118 in) in length. These herbs usually flower in late May to early September, but this can vary with conditions.

Water-plantains are wetland plants and found in saturated soils and shallow water as well as marshes, wooded swamps, shrub swamps and flooded farmland. When introduced to an area, water plantain can rapidly reproduce.

== Species and subspecies ==
The following taxa are recognized as of May 2014:

- Alisma × bjoerkqvistii Tzvelev - Russia
- Alisma canaliculatum A.Braun & C.D.Bouché - eastern Asia
- Alisma gramineum Lej. - Europe, Asia, North Africa; minor naturalization in North America
- Alisma × juzepczukii Tzvelev - European Russia
- Alisma lanceolatum Withering - Europe, Asia, North Africa; naturalized in Australia, New Zealand, California etc.
- Alisma nanum D.F.Cui - Xinjiang
- Alisma orientale
- Alisma plantago-aquatica L. - Europe, Asia, Africa
  - Alisma plantago-aquatica subsp. orientale (Sam.) Sam.
  - Alisma plantago-aquatica subsp. plantago-aquatica
- Alisma × rhicnocarpum Schotsman - western Europe
- Alisma subcordatum Raf. eastern North America
- Alisma triviale Pursh - North America
- Alisma wahlenbergii (Holmb.) Juz. Baltic Sea region
