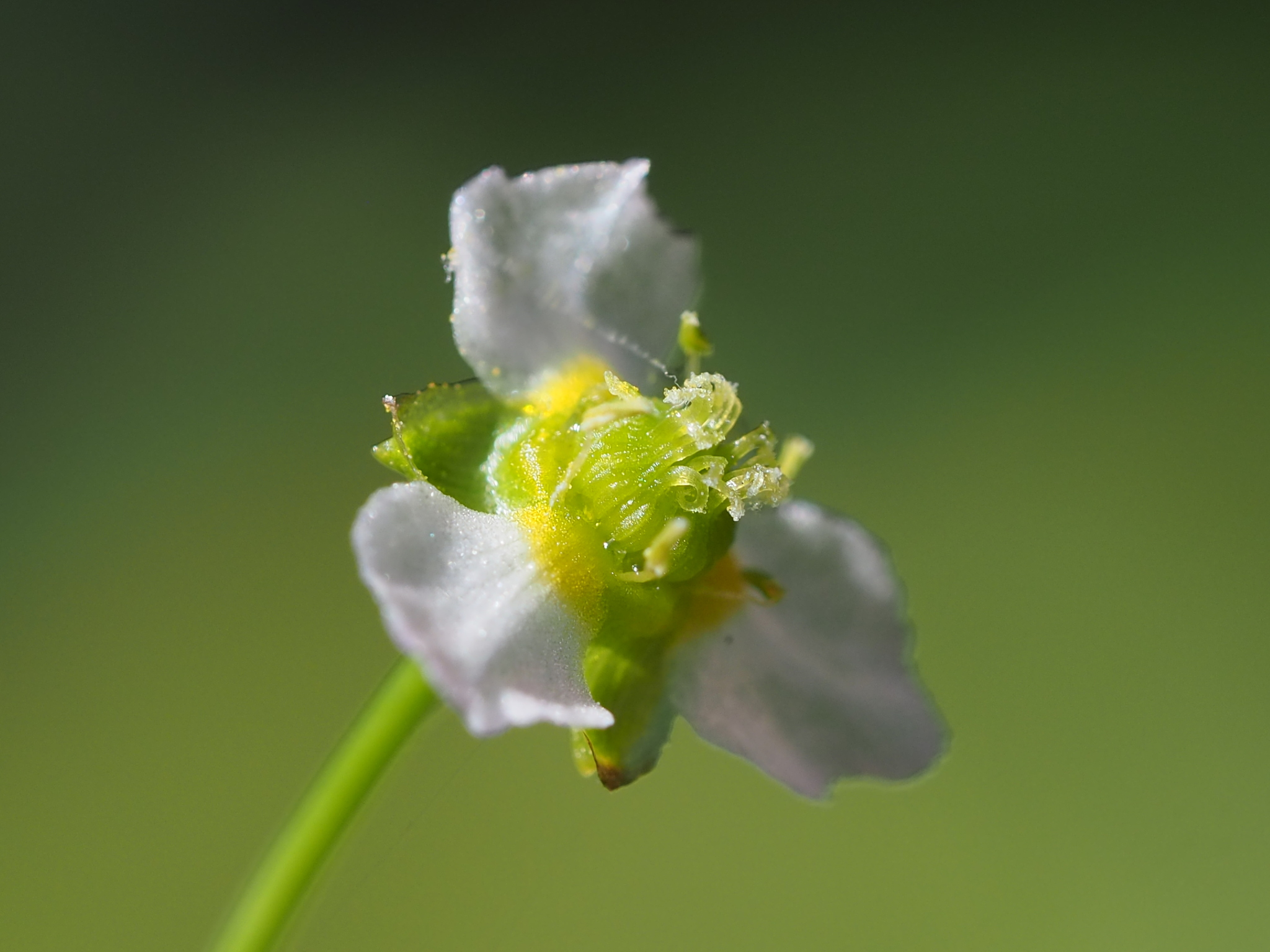

Scientific classification
- Kingdom: Plantae
- Clade: Embryophytes
- Clade: Tracheophytes
- Clade: Spermatophytes
- Clade: Angiosperms
- Clade: Monocots
- Order: Alismatales
- Family: Alismataceae
- Genus: Alisma
- Species: A. canaliculatum

Binomial name
- Alisma canaliculatum A.Braun & C.D.Bouché

Synonyms
- Alisma plantago-aquatica var. canaliculatum (A.Braun & C.D.Bouché) Miyabe & Kudo; Alisma canaliculatum var. harimense Makino; Alisma rariflorum Sam.; Alisma manchukuense Hayashida & Fujimoki; Alisma canaliculatum var. azuminoense Kadono & Hamashima

= Alisma canaliculatum =

Species of plant

Alisma canaliculatum, commonly known as channelled water plantain, is a species of plants in the Alismataceae. It is native to Japan, Korea, the Ryukyu Islands, Taiwan, the Kuril Islands, and China (Anhui, Fujian, Guizhou, Henan, Hubei, Hunan, Jiangsu, Jiangxi, Shandong, Sichuan, Zhejiang).

Alisma canaliculatum is a perennial herb with tubers up to 3 cm (1.2 in) across. Leaves are lanceolate, up to 50 cm (20 in) long. Flowers are white, borne in a branching panicle.
