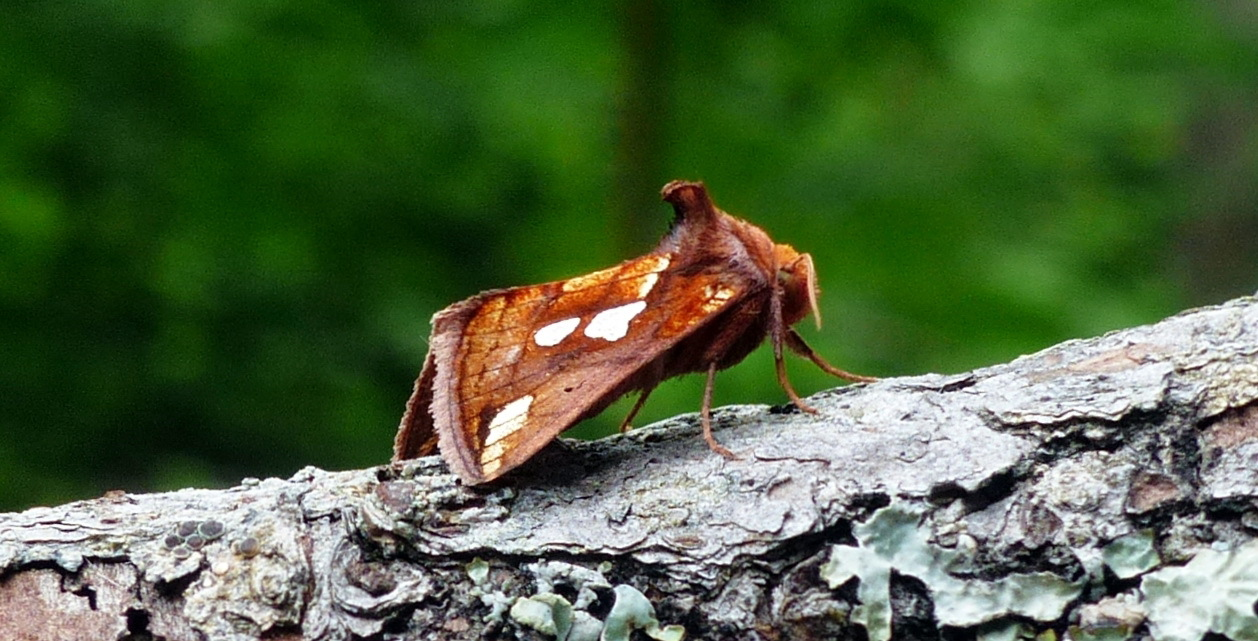

Scientific classification
- Domain: Eukaryota
- Kingdom: Animalia
- Phylum: Arthropoda
- Class: Insecta
- Order: Lepidoptera
- Superfamily: Noctuoidea
- Family: Noctuidae
- Tribe: Plusiini
- Subtribe: Plusiina
- Genus: Plusia
- Species: P. magnimacula

Binomial name
- Plusia magnimacula D. & L. Handfield, 2006

= Plusia magnimacula =

Species of moth

Plusia magnimacula is a species of looper moth in the family Noctuidae. It is found in North America.

The MONA or Hodges number for Plusia magnimacula is 8951.1.
