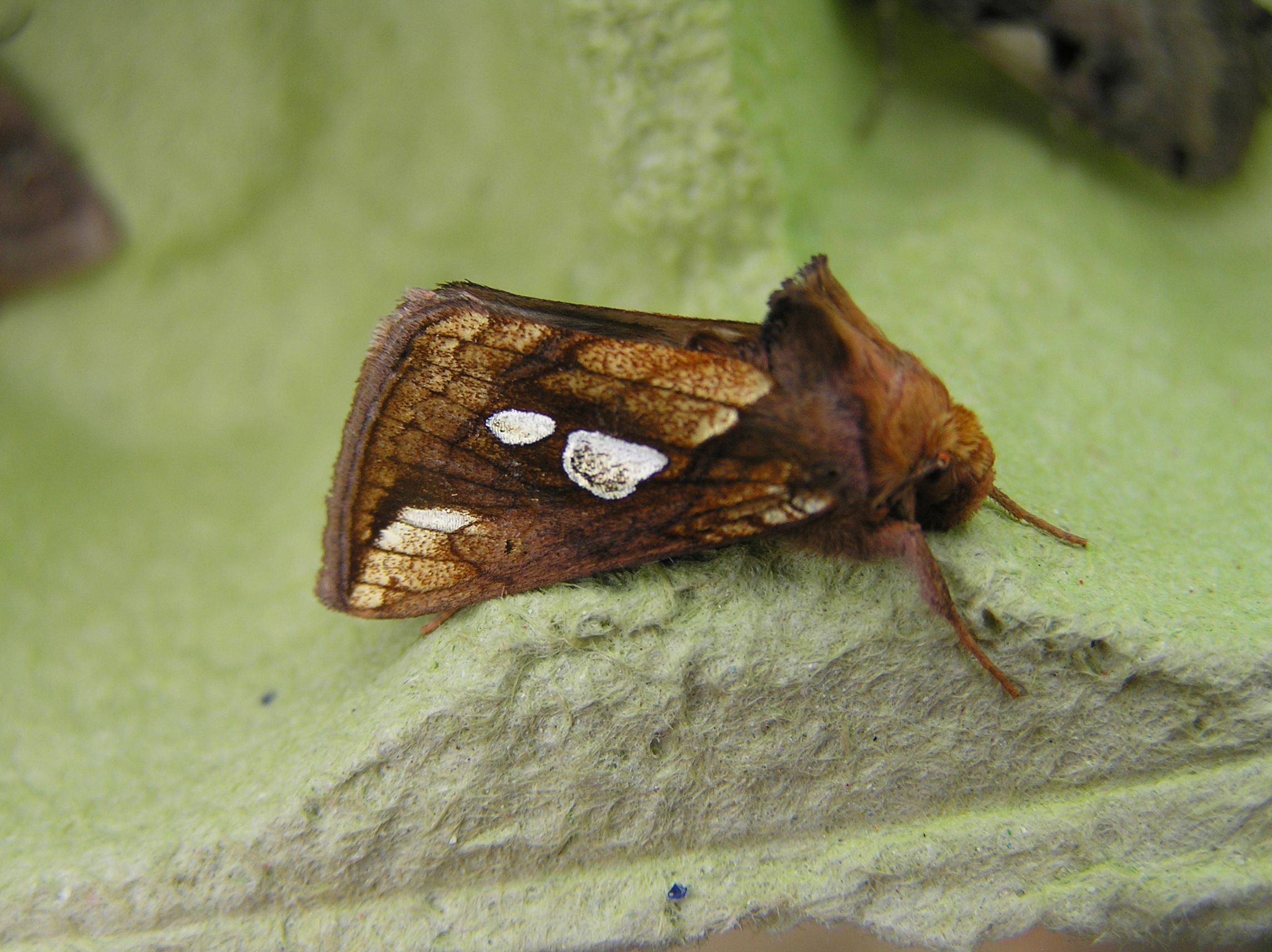
- Plusia festucae

Scientific classification
- Domain: Eukaryota
- Kingdom: Animalia
- Phylum: Arthropoda
- Class: Insecta
- Order: Lepidoptera
- Superfamily: Noctuoidea
- Family: Noctuidae
- Subtribe: Plusiina
- Genus: Plusia; Ochsenheimer, 1816

= Plusia =

Genus of moths

Plusia is a genus of moths of the family Noctuidae. The genus was erected by Ferdinand Ochsenheimer in 1816.

== Description ==
Palpi upturned, where the second joint reaching vertex of head. Antennae of male ciliated. Thorax with a very large spreading tuft on the vertex. Abdomen with three large dorsal tufts on basal segments, and lateral and anal tufts more or less strongly developed in male. Forewings hooked at outer angle. Larva with two pairs of abdominal prolegs.

== Species ==
- Plusia contexta Grote, 1873
- Plusia festucae Linnaeus, 1758 - gold spot
- Plusia magnimacula D. Handfield & L. Handfield, 2006
- Plusia manchurica Lempke, 1966
- Plusia nichollae Hampson, 1913
- Plusia putnami Grote, 1873
- Plusia rosanovi Nabokov, 1912
- Plusia venusta Walker, 1865
