= Eric Hultén =

Swedish botanist, plant geographer and explorer

Eric Hultén Member of the Royal Swedish Academy of Sciences
- Born: 18 March 1894; Halla, Södermanland, Sweden
- Died: 1 February 1981 (aged 86)
- Education: Stockholm University; Lund University
- Known for: Coining the term Beringia; Extensive work on the flora of the Arctic (Kamchatka, Aleutian Islands, Alaska) and Scandes Mountains.
- Spouse: Elsie Hultén
- Children: Pontus Hultén
- Scientific career
- Fields: Botany, plant Geography, arctic Exploration
- Workplaces: Swedish Museum of Natural History (Professor and Head of Botany Section, 1945–1961)
- Thesis: (1937)
- Author abbrev. (botany): Hultén

Oskar Eric Gunnar Hultén (18 March 1894 – 1 February 1981) was a Swedish botanist, plant geographer and 20th century explorer of The Arctic. He was born in Halla in Södermanland. He took his licentiate exam 1931 at Stockholm University and obtained his doctorate degree in botany at Lund University in 1937. In his thesis, he coined the term Beringia for the ice-age land bridge between Eurasia and North America. From 1945 to 1961, he was a professor and head of the Botany Section at the Swedish Museum of Natural History. In 1953, he was elected to the Royal Swedish Academy of Sciences as member number 977.

Hultén travelled extensively in the Scandes Mountains and Siberia, Kamchatka (1920–22 together with his spouse Elsie Hultén, Sten Bergman and René Malaise), the Aleutian Islands and Alaska (1932). He published extensive accounts on the flora of several of these regions and distribution maps of thousands of species.

Hultén edited an exsiccata entitled with G. Samuelsson (+): Plantae Sueciae exsiccatae. Edidit Eric Hultén. It is a series of numbered duplicate specimens collected by the Swedish botanist Gunnar Samuelsson (1885 – 1944) and - after his death - distributed among a number of institutional herbaria.

He was the father of the professor of art history and art collector Pontus Hultén. Hultén authored several botanical monographs on the Nordic area and from his travels in Siberia and the Aleutian Islands. In 1973, he published his memoirs under the title Men roligt har det varit ("But it's been fun").

Several dozen plant species have been named to his honour, e.g.

- Ligusticum hultenii, by Merritt Lyndon Fernald
- Salix hultenii, by Björn Floderus

== Selected publications ==
- Hultén, Eric (1927–1930) Flora of Kamtchatka and the adjacent islands, vol. 1-4. Kungl. Svenska vetenskapsakademiens handlingar 5(1) and 8(2). Stockholm, Almqvist & Wiksell.
- Hultén, Eric (1937) Flora of the Aleutian islands and westernmost Alaska peninsula with notes on the flora of Commander islands. Stockholm, Thule. 397 pp. 2nd edn. 1960 (series: Flora et vegetatio mundi, vol. 1) Weinheim, Cramer. 376 pp.
- Hultén, Eric (1937) Outline of the history of arctic and boreal biota during the quaternary period: their evolution during and after the glacial period as indicated by the equiformal progressive areas of present plant species. Stockholm, Thule. 168 pp. Dissertation, Lund University.
- Hultén, Eric (1940) History of botanical exploration in Alaska and Yukon territories from the time of their discovery to 1940. Meddelanden från Lunds Botaniska Museum vol. 50, 346 pp. Reprint J. Cramer, 1972. ISBN 3-7682-0006-X
- Hultén, Eric (1941–1950) Flora of Alaska and Yukon, vol. 1-10. Lunds Universitets Årsskrift, 2 avd Medicin samt matematiska och naturvetenskapliga ämnen ISSN 0368-8151 and Kungl. Fysiografiska sällskapets i Lund handlingar.
- Hultén, Eric (1950) Atlas över växternas utbredning i Norden : fanerogamer och ormbunksväxter = Atlas of the distribution of vascular plants in northwestern Europe. Stockholm, Generalstabens Litografiska Anstalt. 512 pp.
- Hultén, Eric (1958) The Amphi-atlantic plants and their phytogeographical connections. Kungl. Svenska vetenskapsakademiens handlingar, 4:7:1: 340 pp. Stockholm, Almqvist & Wiksell. Reprinted by Koeltz, 1973.
- Hultén, Eric (1962) The circumpolar plants. 1, Vascular cryptogams, conifers, monocotyledons. Kungl. Svenska vetenskapsakademiens handlingar, 4:8:5: 275 pp. Stockholm, Almqvist & Wiksell.
- Hultén, Eric (1968) Flora of Alaska and neighboring territories: a manual of the vascular plants. Stanford CA. 1008 pp.
- Hultén, Eric (1971) The circumpolar plants. 2, Dicotyledons. Kungl. Svenska vetenskapsakademiens handlingar, 4:13:1: 463 pp. Stockholm, Almqvist & Wiksell.
- Hultén, Eric (1971) Atlas över växternas utbredning i Norden : fanerogamer och ormbunksväxter = Atlas of the distribution of vascular plants in northwestern Europe, 2nd edn. Stockholm, Generalstabens Litografiska Anstalt. 531 pp. Most of the maps may be found at Den Virtuella Floran
- Hultén, Eric & Fries, Magnus (1986) Atlas of North European vascular plants: north of the Tropic of Cancer, vol. 1-3. Königstein, Koeltz. ISBN 3-87429-263-0 Many of the maps may be found at Den Virtuella Floran
