= Alisma wahlenbergii =

Baltic water-plantain

Conservation status
- Vulnerable (IUCN 3.1)

Scientific classification
- Kingdom: Plantae
- Clade: Tracheophytes
- Clade: Angiosperms
- Clade: Monocots
- Order: Alismatales
- Family: Alismataceae
- Genus: Alisma
- Species: A. wahlenbergii

Binomial name
- Alisma wahlenbergii (Holmb.) Juz.

Species of aquatic plant

Alisma wahlenbergii, the Baltic water-plantain, is a species of plant in the family Alismataceae. It is native to the area around the northern Baltic Sea: Finland, Sweden, Estonia, Latvia, Lithuania, and northern and northwestern Russia.

Alisma wahlenbergii is classed as a "threatened" species.
