= 2,4,5-Trihydroxycinnamic acid =

Names
- Preferred IUPAC name (2E)-3-(2,4,5-Trihydroxyphenyl)prop-2-enoic acid
- Other names 2,4,5-THC (Z)-2,4,5-Trihydroxycinnamic acid

Identifiers
CAS Number	2631046-97-2; 56437-15-1 (non-specific)
3D model (JSmol)	Interactive image
ChEMBL	ChEMBL1765652
ChemSpider	14089396
PubChem CID	25244000
UNII	JMT8N4J5PA
- InChI: InChI=1S/C9H8O5/c10-6-4-8(12)7(11)3-5(6)1-2-9(13)14/h1-4,10-12H,(H,13,14)/b2-1- Key: GUOJZFSYQUIYCN-UPHRSURJSA-N
- SMILES: OC(=O)\C=C\c(cc1O)c(O)cc1O

Properties
Chemical formula	C_{9}H_{8}O_{5}
Molar mass	196.158 g·mol^{−1}
- Except where otherwise noted, data are given for materials in their standard state (at 25 °C [77 °F], 100 kPa). Infobox references

2,4,5-Trihydroxycinnamic acid is a hydroxycinnamic acid found in rooibos tea. cis-2,4,5-Trihydroxycinnamic acid can be isolated from seeds of Alisma orientale.
