= Alisma nanum =

Xinjiang water-plantain

Scientific classification
- Kingdom: Plantae
- Clade: Tracheophytes
- Clade: Angiosperms
- Clade: Monocots
- Order: Alismatales
- Family: Alismataceae
- Genus: Alisma
- Species: A. nanum

Binomial name
- Alisma nanum D.F.Cui

Species of aquatic plant

Alisma nanum is a species of plant in the Alismataceae. It is endemic to Xinjiang in western China, where it grows in marshes at elevations of about 600 m.
