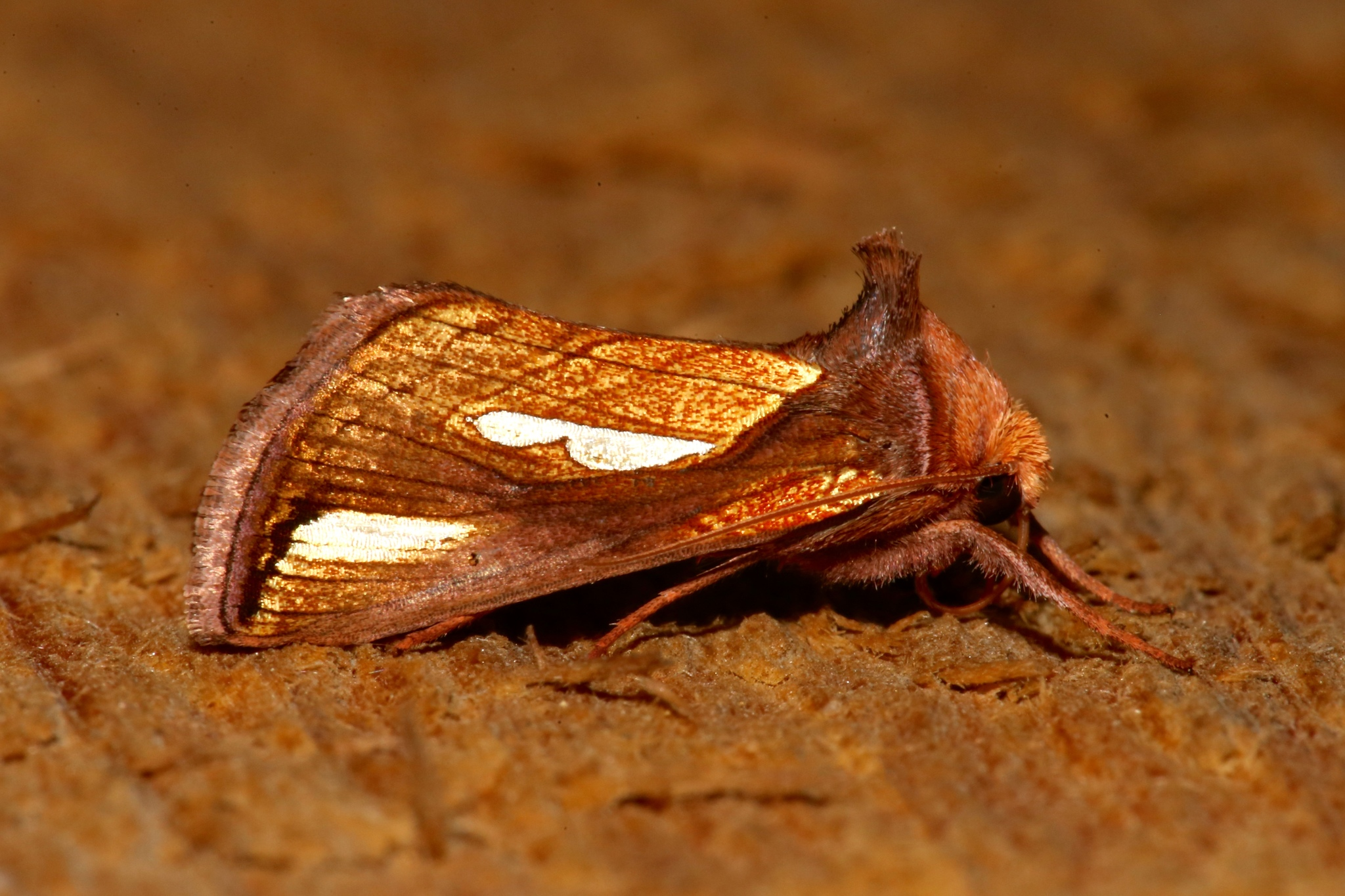

Scientific classification
- Kingdom: Animalia
- Phylum: Arthropoda
- Clade: Pancrustacea
- Class: Insecta
- Order: Lepidoptera
- Superfamily: Noctuoidea
- Family: Noctuidae
- Genus: Plusia
- Species: P. contexta

Binomial name
- Plusia contexta Grote, 1873

= Plusia contexta =

Species of moth

Plusia contexta, the connected looper, is a species of looper moth in the family Noctuidae. It is found in North America.

Mature caterpillars are a vibrant grass green. They have narrow whitish dorsal and subdorsal lines and a broad yellowish lateral stripe.

== Distribution and habitat ==
The distribution area of Plusia contexta extends through the eastern and central regions of North America. The species inhabits meadows and fields.
