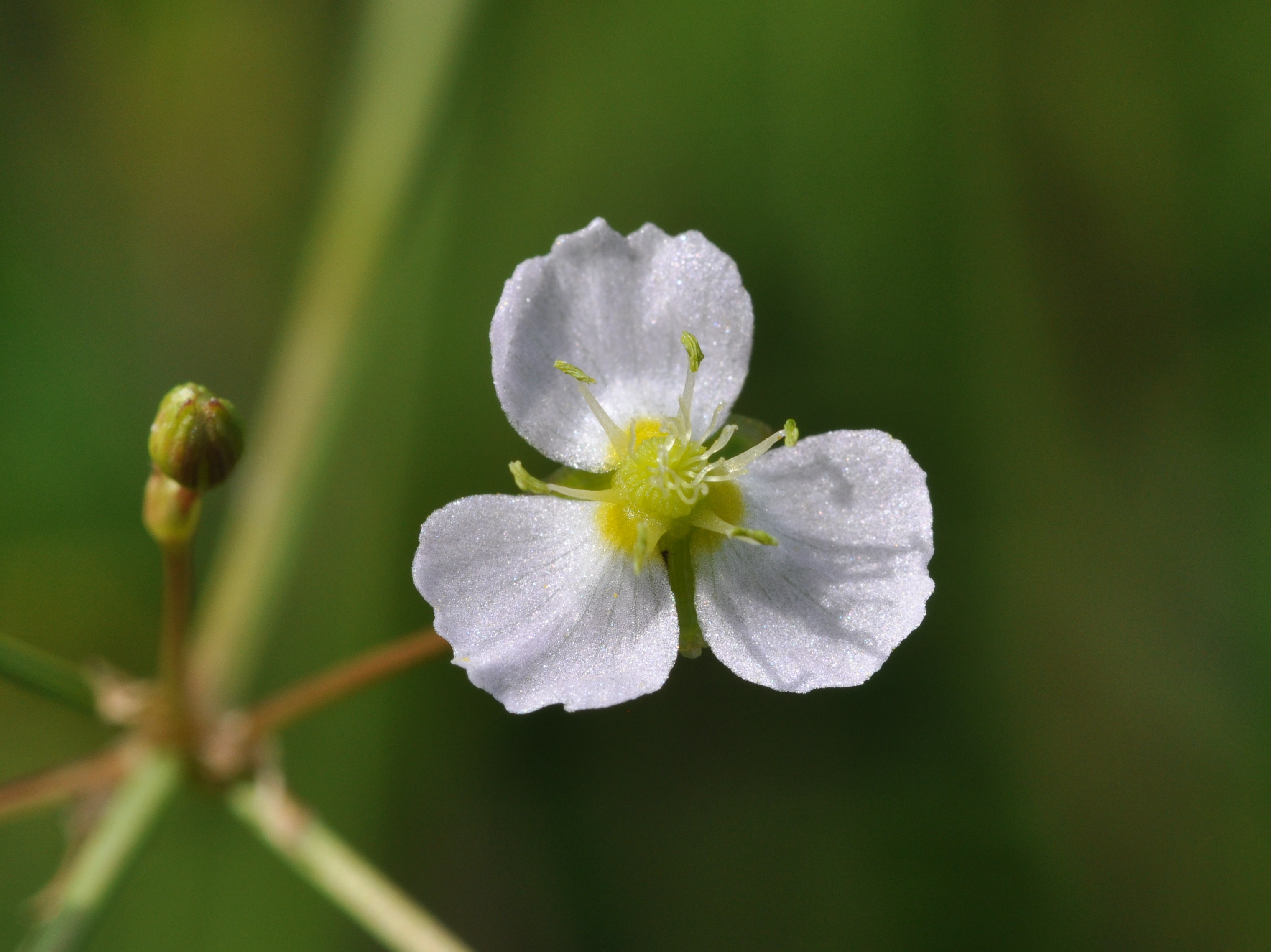

Conservation status
- Least Concern (IUCN 3.1)

Scientific classification
- Kingdom: Plantae
- Clade: Tracheophytes
- Clade: Angiosperms
- Clade: Monocots
- Order: Alismatales
- Family: Alismataceae
- Genus: Alisma
- Species: A. plantago-aquatica

Binomial name
- Alisma plantago-aquatica L., 1753

= Alisma plantago-aquatica =

Species of plant

Alisma plantago-aquatica, also known as European water-plantain, common water-plantain or mad-dog weed, is a perennial flowering aquatic plant widespread across most of Europe and Asia, and apparently spread elsewhere in both the Old and New World.

== Description ==
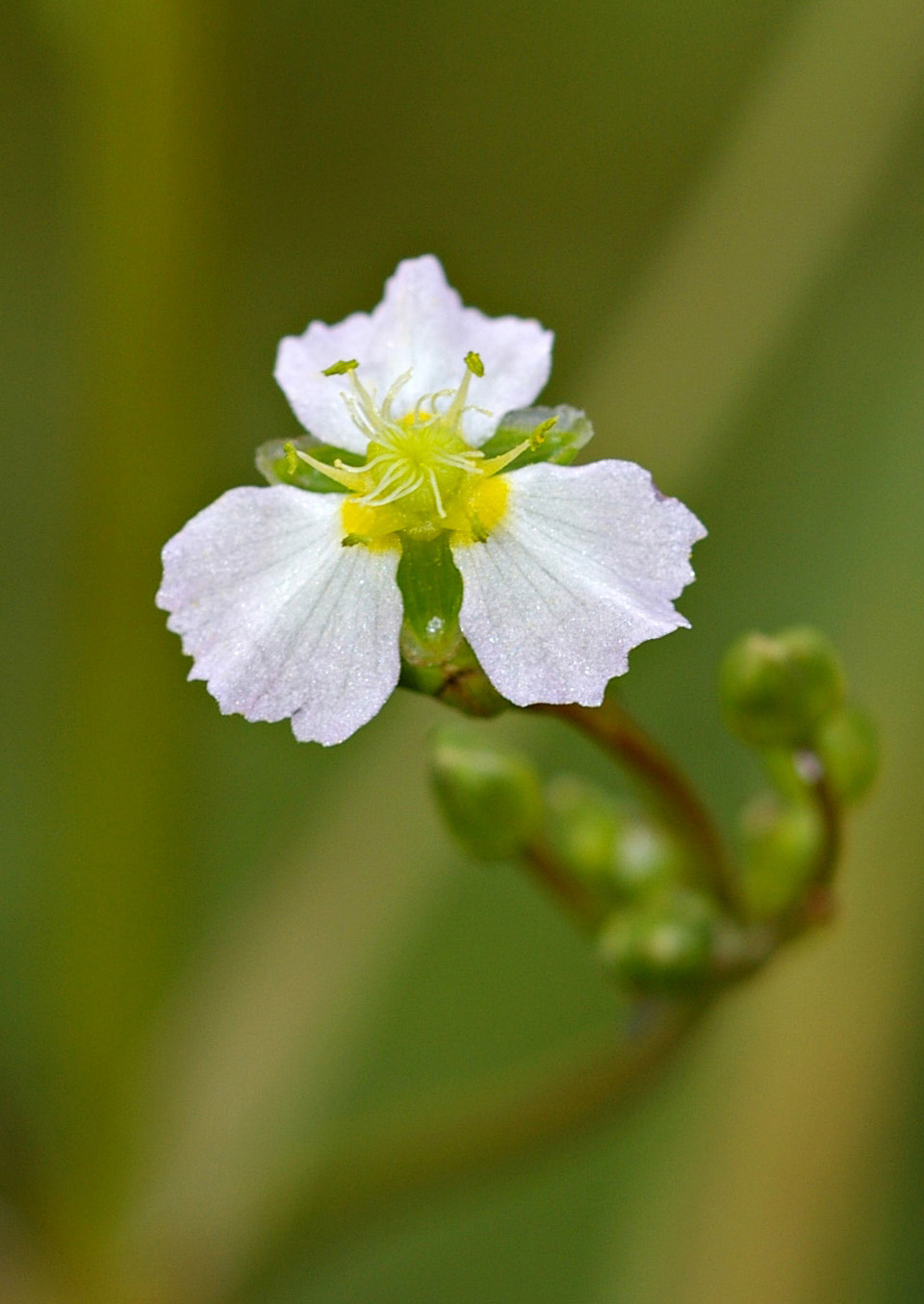
Flower

Alisma plantago-aquatica is a hairless plant that grows in shallow water, consists of a fibrous root, several basal long stemmed leaves 15–30 centimetres (6–12 inches) long, and a triangular stem up to 1 metre (3 1/2 feet) tall. It has branched inflorescence bearing numerous small flowers, 1 cm (1/2 in) across, with three round or slightly jagged, white or pale purple petals. The flowers open in the afternoon. There are three blunt green sepals and six stamens per flower. The carpels often exist as a flat single whorl. It flowers from June until August. The fruits appear as a ring of seeds inside each flower.

=== Chemistry ===
Chemical constituents of Rhizoma Alismatis—rhizomes of Alisma orientale (syn. Alisma plantago-aquatica var. orientale) as a traditional Chinese medicine—include alisol A 24-acetate and alisol B 23-acetate. The content of these two compounds are significantly different in Rhizoma Alismatis of different areas.

=== Similar species ===
Narrow-leaved water plantain Alisma lanceolatum differs only in that the leaf tips are acuminate and shape is narrow lanceolate.

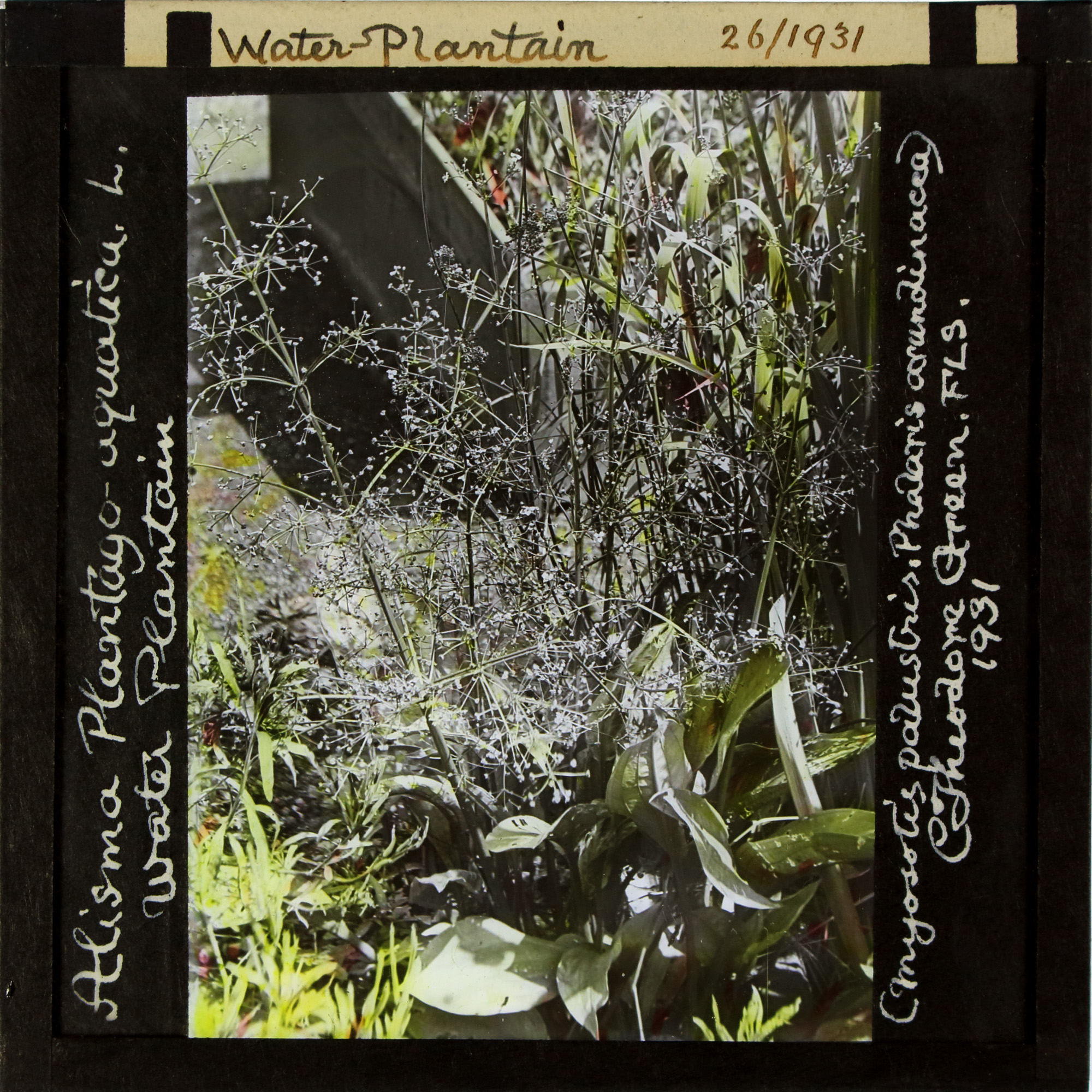
Image of a water plantain by Theodore Green (1931).

According to some sources, presumed specimens found in North America are actually the similar A. subcordatum and A. trivale.

== Taxonomy ==
The word alisma is said to be a word of Celtic origin meaning "water", a reference to the habitat in which it grows. Early botanists named it after the Plantago because of the similarity of their leaves.

== Distribution and habitat ==
The species is widespread across most of Europe and Asia from Portugal and Morocco to Japan, Kamchatka and Vietnam. It is also regarded as native in northern and central Africa as far south as Tanzania, and in Australia. It is reportedly naturalized in southern Africa, New Zealand, Alaska, British Columbia, Washington state and Connecticut. Some sources maintain that the species is widespread across North America, but these reports appear to have been based on misidentified specimens. It is found on mud or in fresh waters.

== Uses ==
The rootstocks contain starch and can be boiled or soaked to remove bitterness before eating. Aquatic plants in general should be cooked before consumption to kill parasites.

According to Flora of the U.S.S.R. (1934), "A powder prepared from dried roots is used in popular medicine as a cure for rabies and crushed leaves are used against mammary congestion; fresh leaves are employed in homeopathy. ... Since this species is often confounded or identified with others of the genus, the reported data may also refer to [A. orientale or A. lanceolatum]." A. plantago-aquatica is also known as mad-dog weed, as if it could be used to cure rabies, but should not be confused with Scutellaria lateriflora (mad-dog skullcap), which is also sometimes called mad-dog weed.

Alisma orientale is sometimes treated as a variety of this species (A. plantago-aquatica var. orientale). The rhizomes of A. orientale have been used as a traditional Chinese medicine, ze xie. However, it may have serious side effects or even toxic effects such as hepatotoxicity in patients with chronic hepatitis B.
