= Björn Floderus =

Swedish physician and botanist (1867–1941)

Björn Gustaf Oscar Floderus (14 August 1867, Uppsala – 12 May 1941, Stockholm) was a Swedish physician and botanist, specializing in the willow genus Salix. He was the son of educator Manfred Mustafa Floderus (1832–1909).

Beginning in 1885 he studied medicine at the University of Uppsala, where in 1897 he became privat docent of surgery. In 1899 he relocated to Stockholm as chief of surgery at Crown Princess Lovisa's clinic for children. From 1899 to 1917, he was an assistant instructor of surgery at Karolinska Institutet.

As a botanist, he engaged in study trips to Arkhangelsk and Novaya Zemlya (1911), western Greenland (1921), the northern shore of Kola Peninsula (1923, 1927) as well as conducting numerous botanical excursions throughout the Nordic countries. In Norway, he studied in-depth, willow flora native to the Arctic coast. On two of his journeys, he explored Kalastajasaarento.

== Selected works ==
- Bidrag till kämmedomen om Salix floran i Torne Lappmark, 1908.
- Studien in der Biologie der Skelettgewebe mit besonderer Berücksichtigung der Pathogenese der Histoiden Gelenkgewebsgeschwülste, 1915 – Studies involving the biology of skeletal tissue with particular reference to the pathogenesis of histoid tumors of joints.
- Om Grönland salices, 1923.
- "On the Salix Flora of Kamtchatka", Almqvist & Wiksells, 1926.
- "Salicaceae Fennoscandicae", Stockholm : P.A. Norstedt, 1931 (with Otto Rudolf Holmberg).
