= Otto Rudolf Holmberg =

Swedish botanist

Otto Rudolf Holmberg (1 February 1874, Simrishamn – 28 December 1930) was a Swedish botanist. He was an authority on Scandinavian flora.

== Early life and education ==
Beginning in 1893, he received his education in Lund, where from 1909 onward, he served as curator of the botanical institute. During his career he undertook several botanical study trips in Scandinavia.

== Career ==
His main written work was "Skandinaviens flora", published in four parts from 1922 to 1931. Its second volume contained Hampus Wilhelm Arnell's treatise on mosses and liverworts, titled "Mossor a. levermossor". As a taxonomist, he circumscribed a number of species within the grass genus Puccinellia.
